= 2020 New Year Honours (New Zealand) =

Annual awards for New Zealanders

- Previous: 2019 Queen's Birthday Honours; Next: 2020 Queen's Birthday Honours
- Type: New Zealand royal honours: New Zealand Order of Merit; Queen's Service Order; Queen's Service Medal; New Zealand Distinguished Service Decoration
- Date: 31 December 2019
- Country: New Zealand

Highlights
- Total recipients: 180

The 2020 New Year Honours in New Zealand were appointments by Elizabeth II in her right as Queen of New Zealand, on the advice of the New Zealand government, to various orders and honours to reward and highlight good works by New Zealanders, and to celebrate the passing of 2019 and the beginning of 2020. They were announced on 31 December 2019.

The recipients of honours are displayed here as they were styled before their new honour.

== New Zealand Order of Merit ==
=== Dame Companion (DNZM) ===
- Dr Anna Louisa de Launey Crighton QSO JP – of Christchurch. For services to heritage preservation and governance.
- Noeline Taurua – of Te Puke. For services to netball.
- Professor Marilyn Joy Waring CNZM – of Auckland. For services to women and economics.
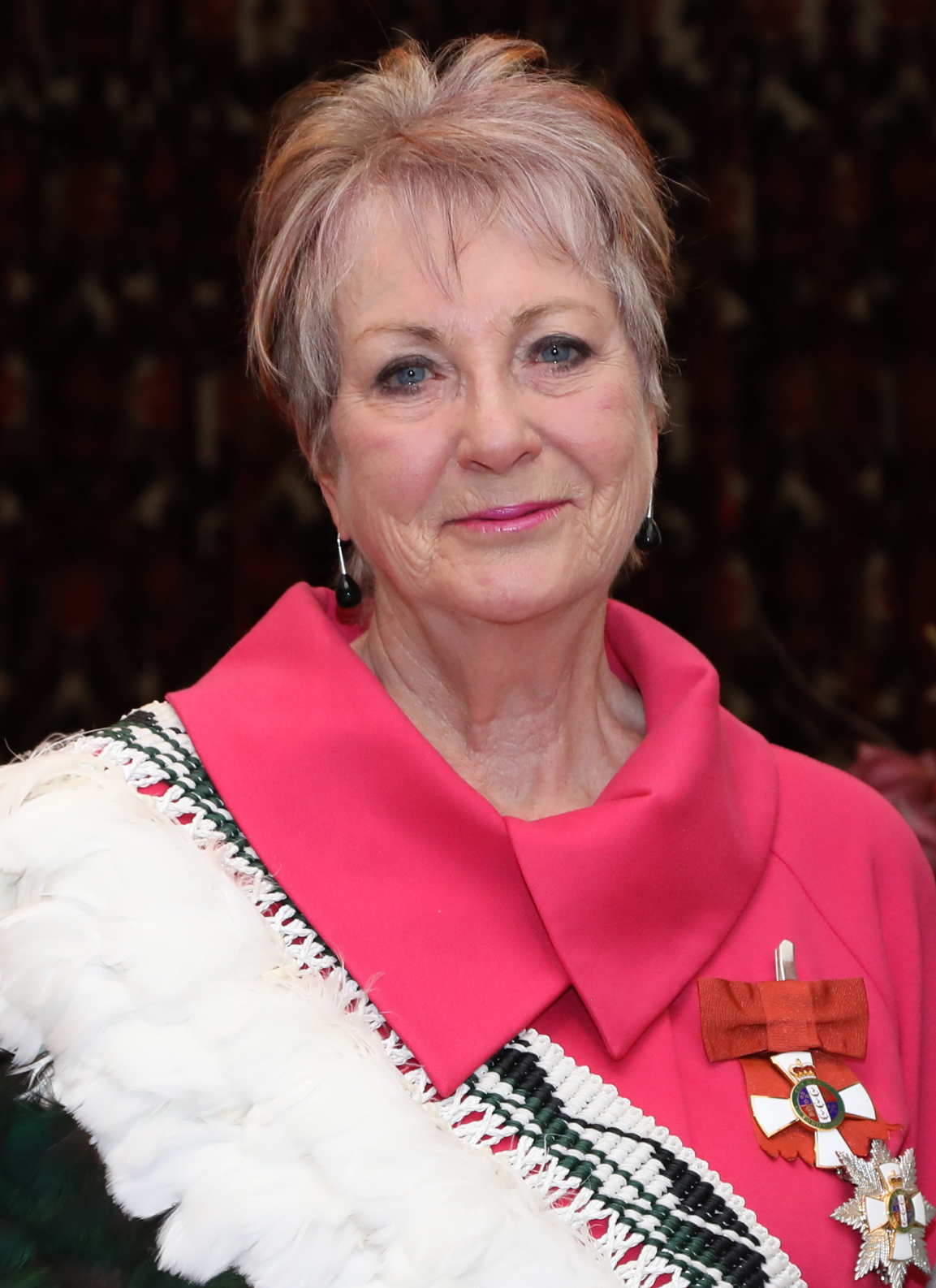
Dame Anna Crighton

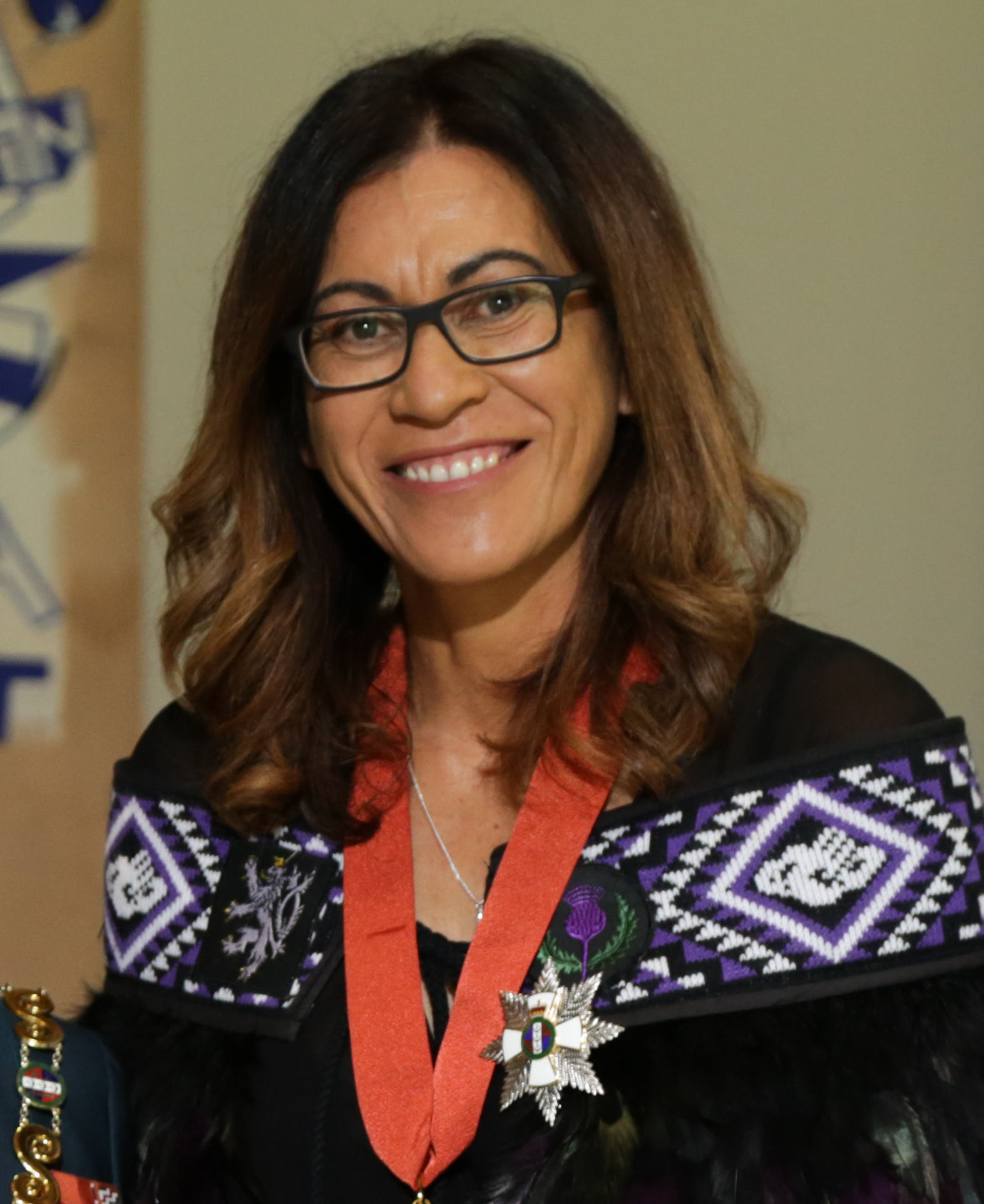
Dame Noeline Taurua

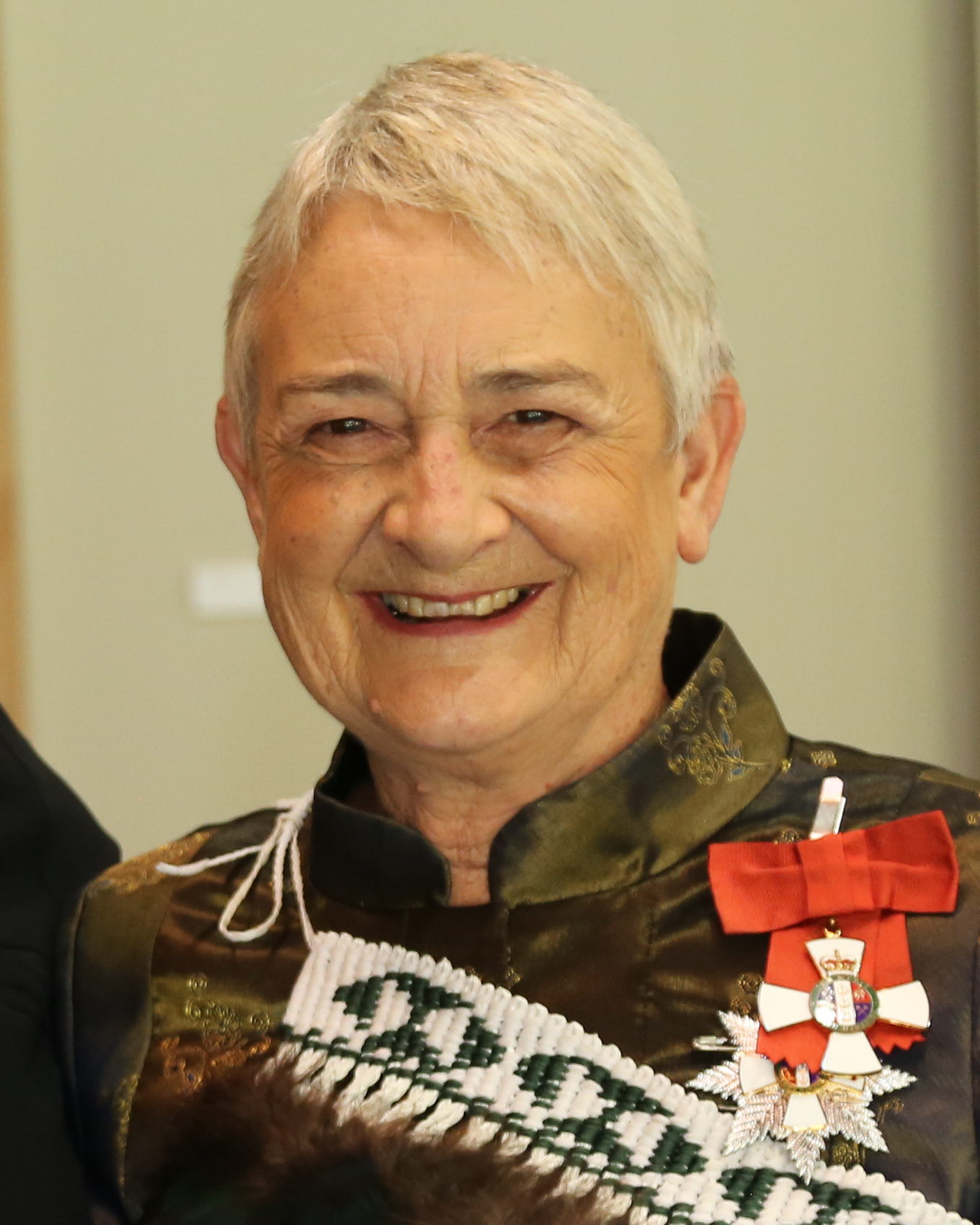
Dame Marilyn Waring

=== Knight Companion (KNZM) ===
- Stephen William Hansen CNZM – of Prebbleton. For services to rugby.
- Robert George Martin MNZM – of Whanganui. For services to people with disabilities.
- The Honourable Joseph Victor Williams – of Wellington. For services to the judiciary.
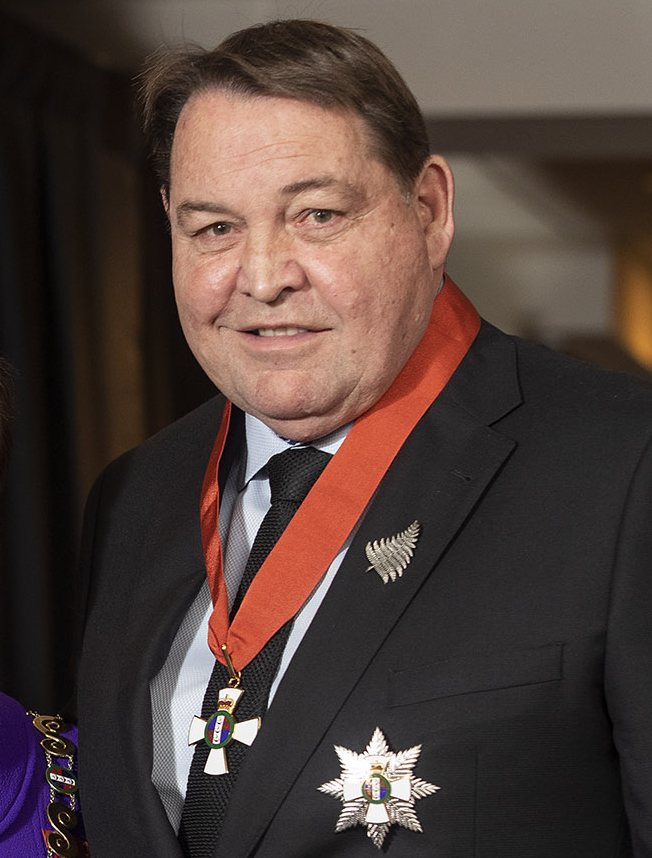
Sir Steve Hansen

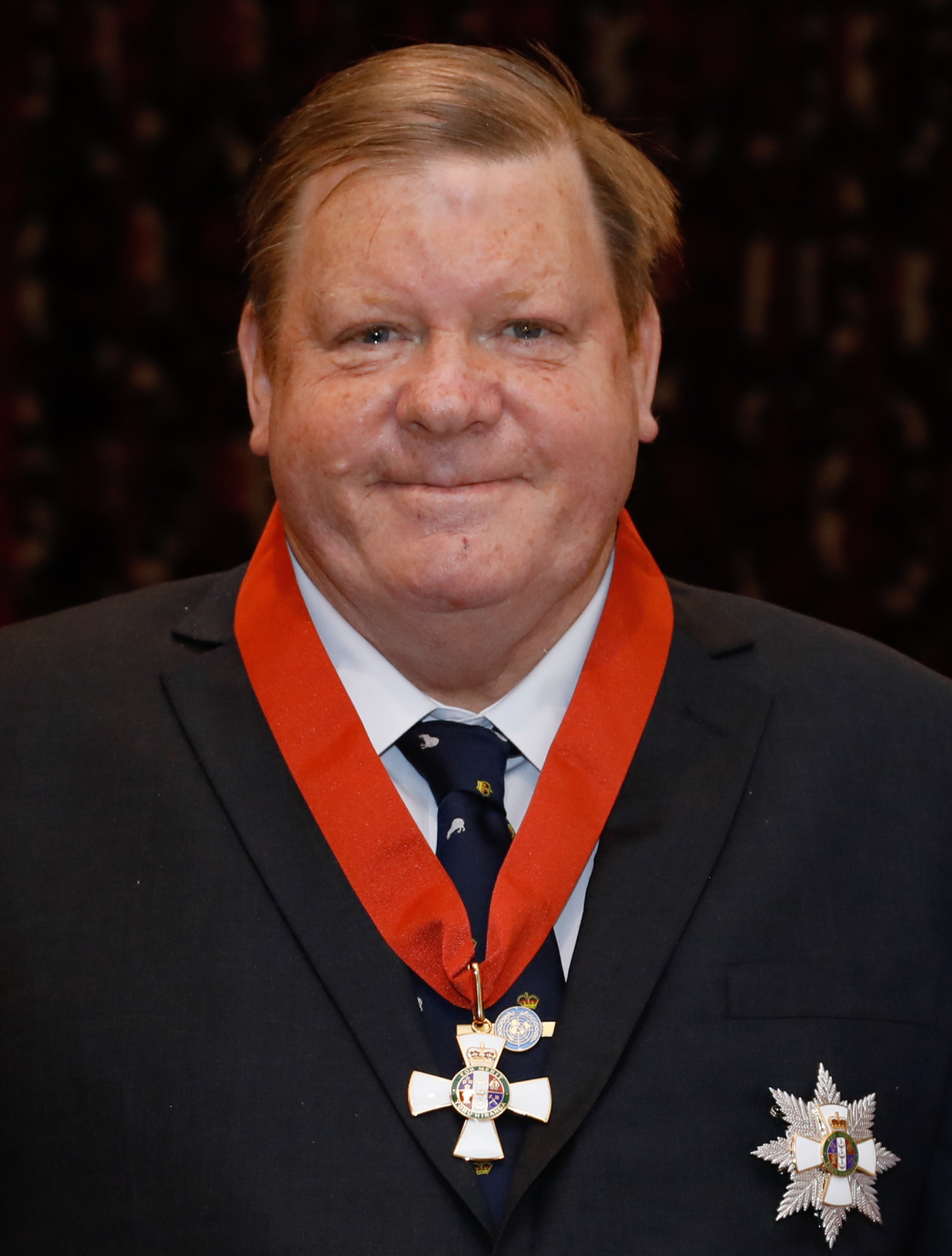
Sir Robert Martin

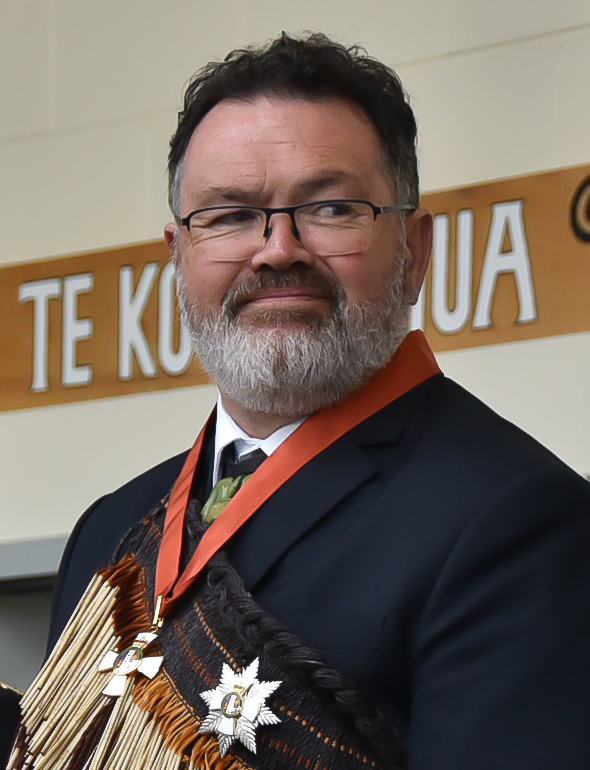
Sir Joe Williams

=== Companion (CNZM) ===
- John Daniel Barnett ONZM – of Freemans Bay. For services to film and television.
- Professor Richard Dodgshun Bedford QSO – of Freemans Bay. For services to governance.
- Robert James Campbell – of Freemans Bay. For services to governance and business.
- Dr Jennifer Barbara Carryer MNZM – of Palmerston North. For services to health, particularly nursing.
- Antony John Carter – of Auckland. For services to business governance.
- Gillian, Lady Deane – of Kelburn. For services to philanthropy, particularly for rare disorders, the arts and youth.
- Helen Mary Heffernan – of Thorndon. For services to health.
- Dr Frances Anne Hughes ONZM JP – of Tītahi Bay. For services to mental health and nursing.
- Rachael Le Mesurier – of Sandringham. For services to governance, the community and health.
- Donald Evan Murray MacCormick – of Epsom. For services to health, particularly surgery.
- Dr Michael Edward Matthews – of Hamilton. For services to food technology and the food industry.
- John Walter McKinnon QSO – of Karori. For services to New Zealand–China relations.
- Roger John Moses ONZM – of Brooklyn. For services to education.
- Helen Joan Plume – of Plimmerton. For services to the environment.
- Dr Edward Ward – of Napier. For services to intensive care practice.
- Dr Dianne Rosemary Webster QSO – of Onehunga. For services to health, particularly paediatrics.
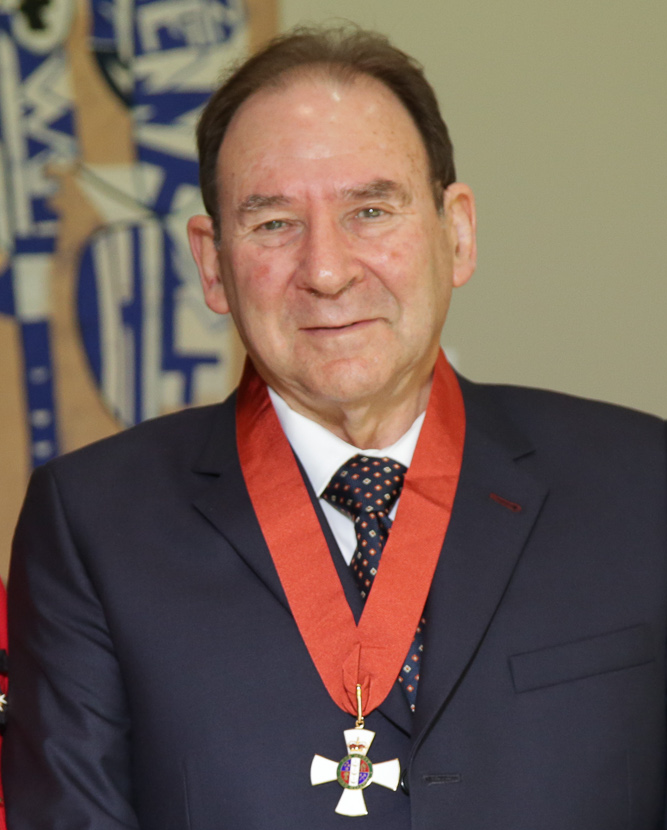
John Barnett

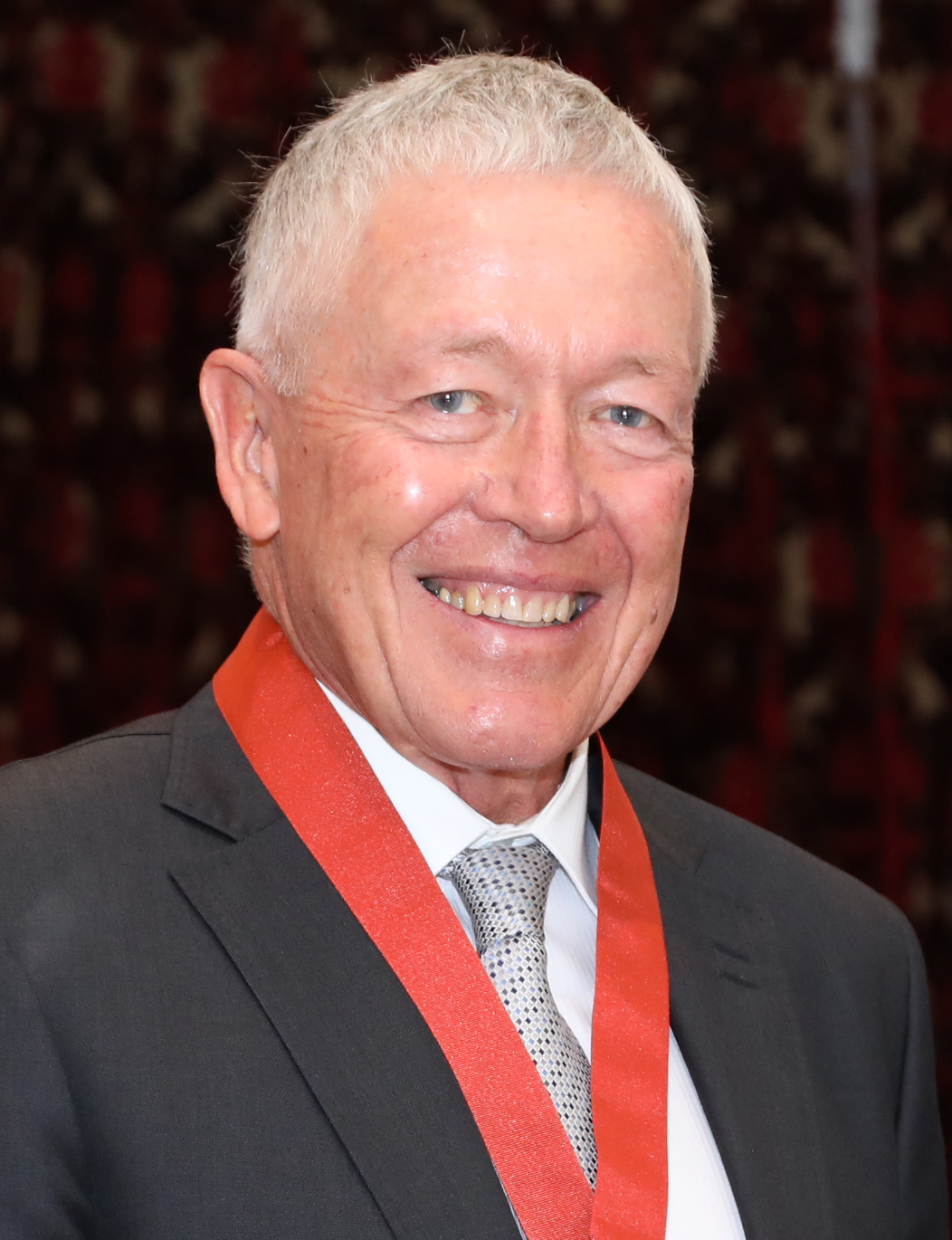
Richard Bedford

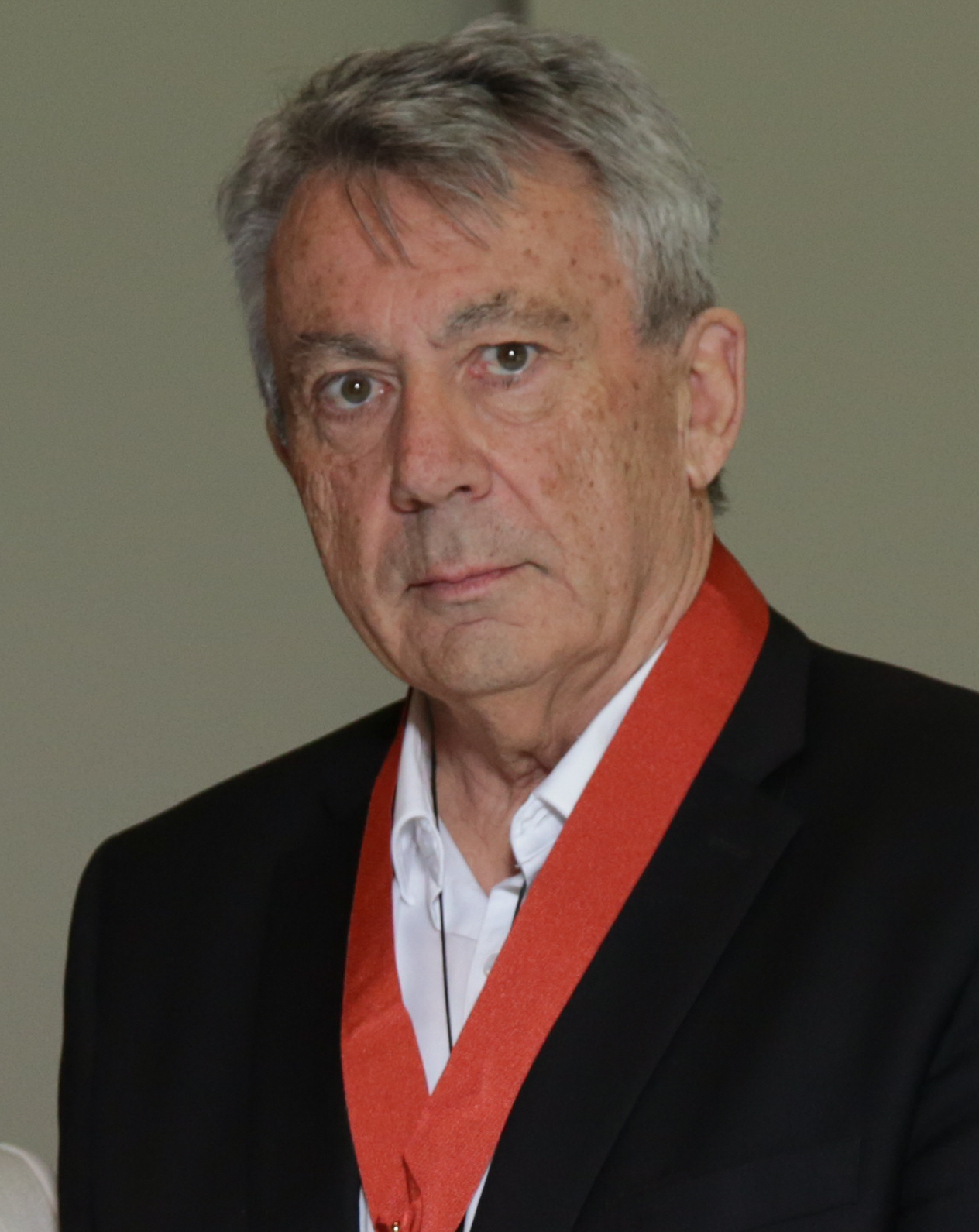
Rob Campbell

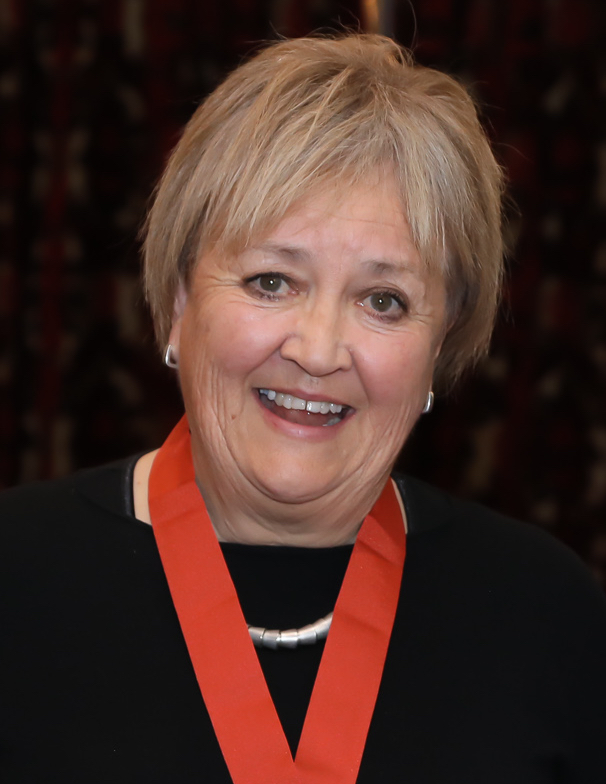
Jenny Carryer

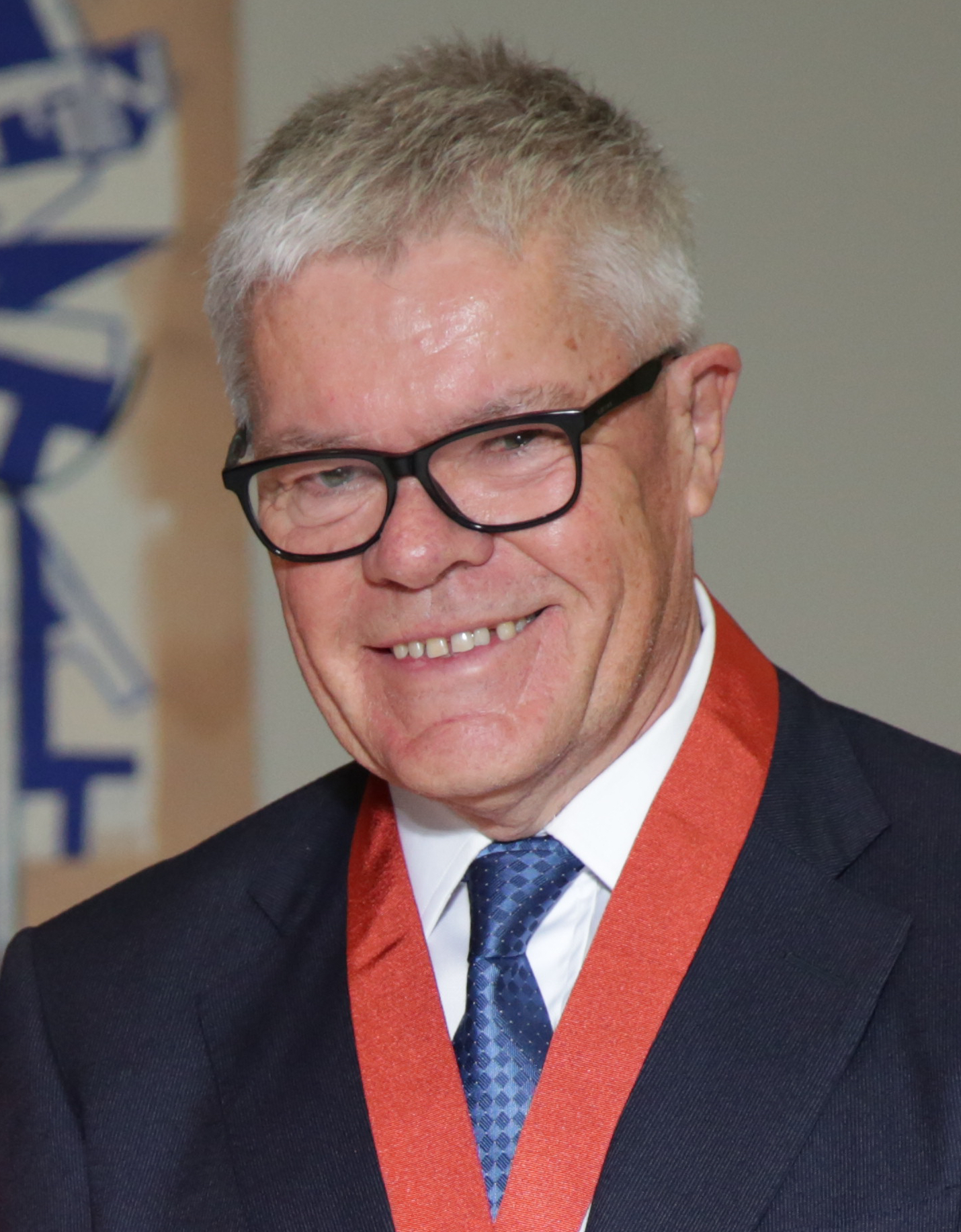
Tony Carter

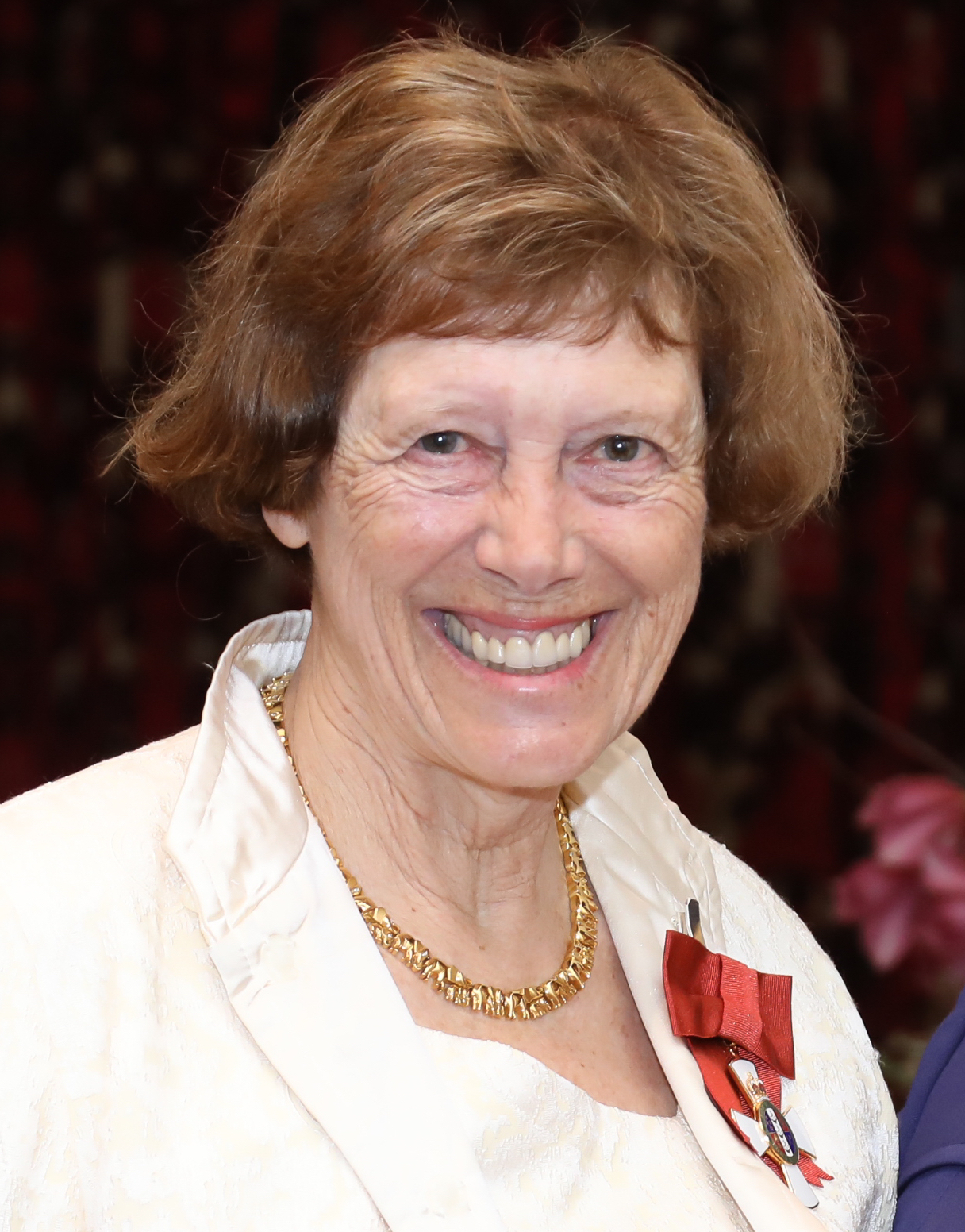
Gillian, Lady Deane

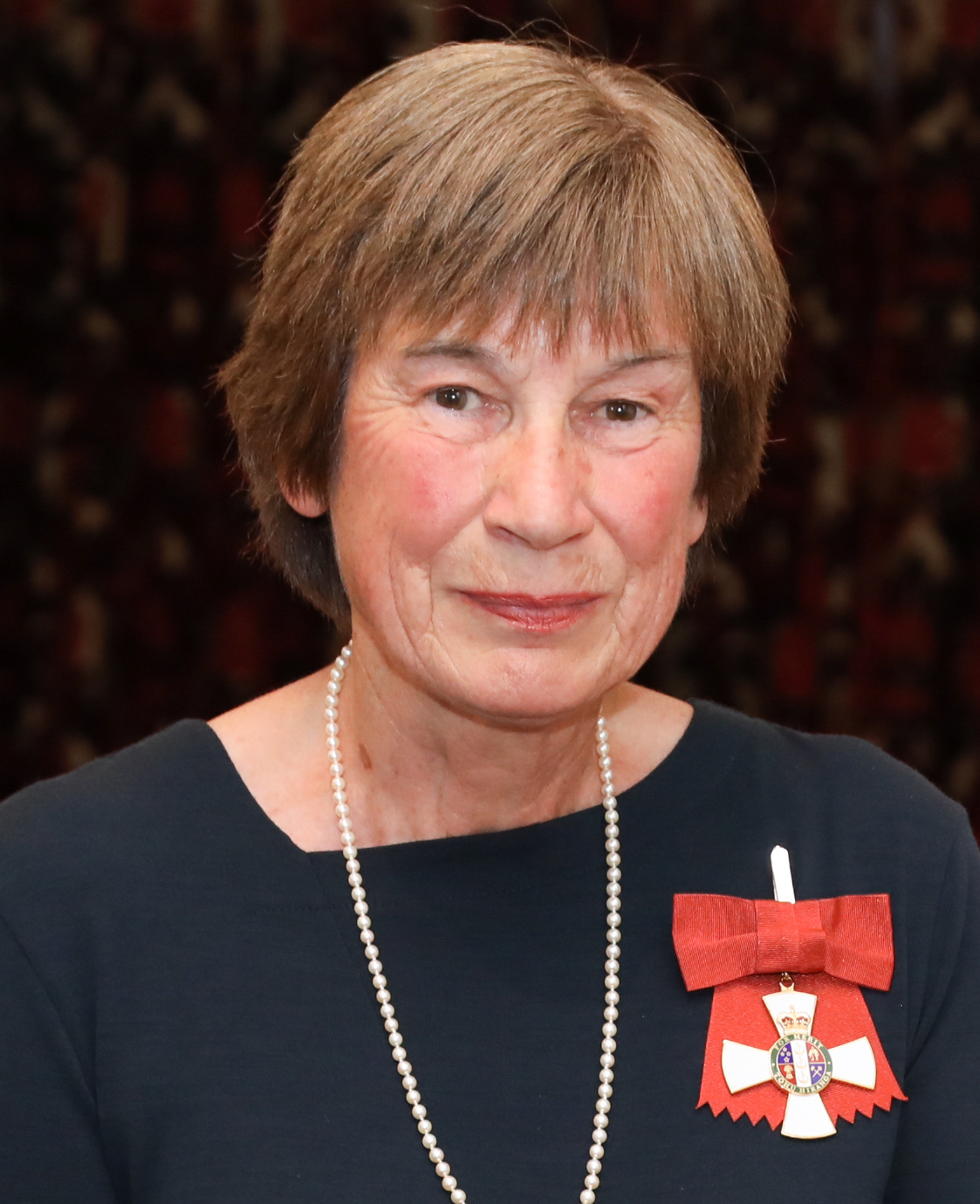
Helen Heffernan

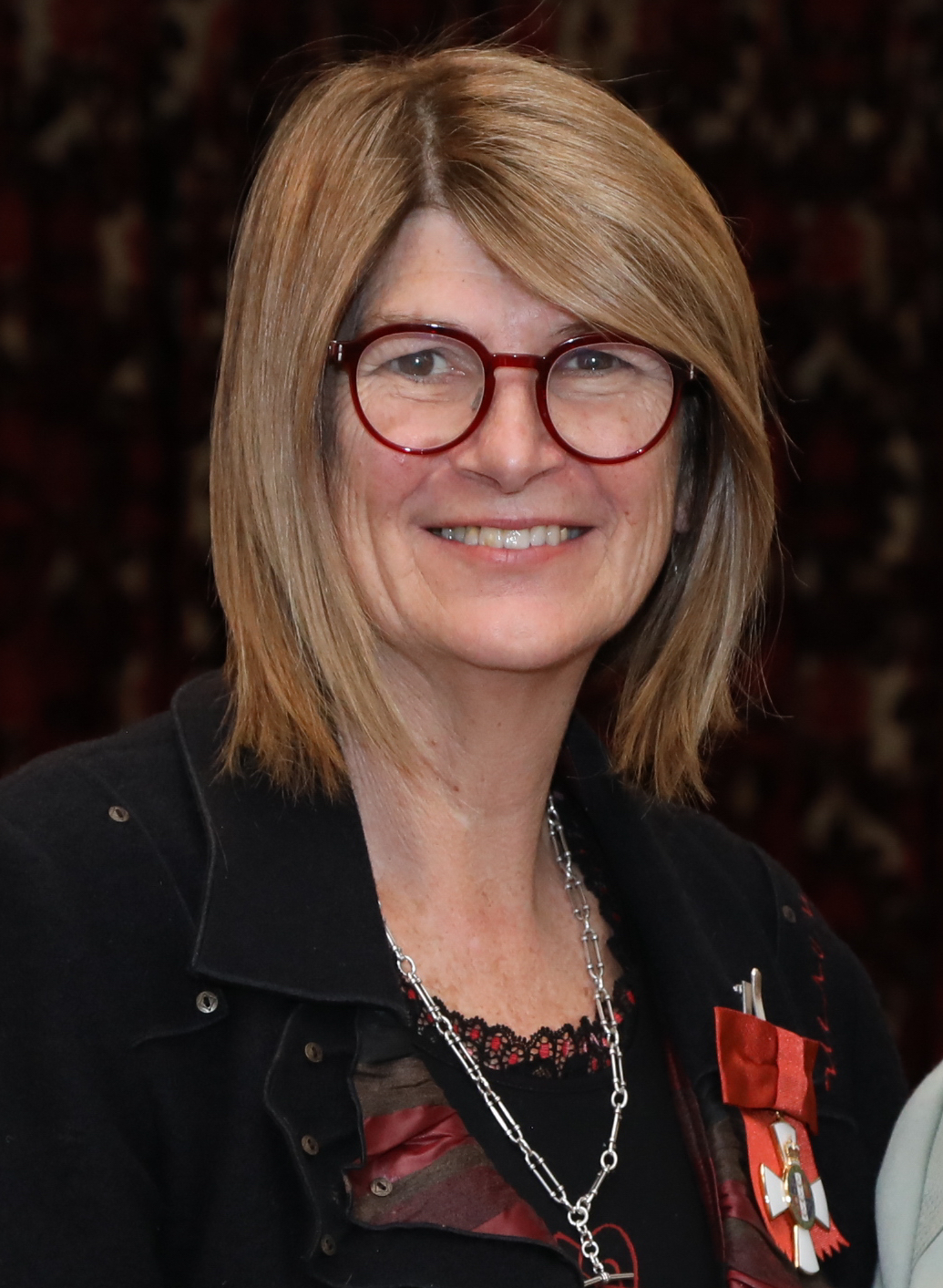
Frances Hughes

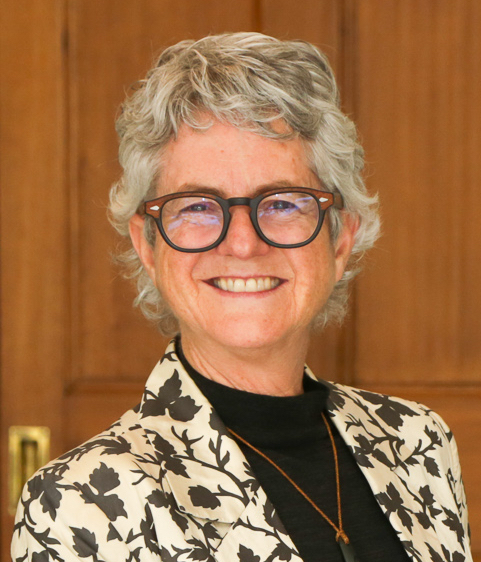
Rachael Le Mesurier

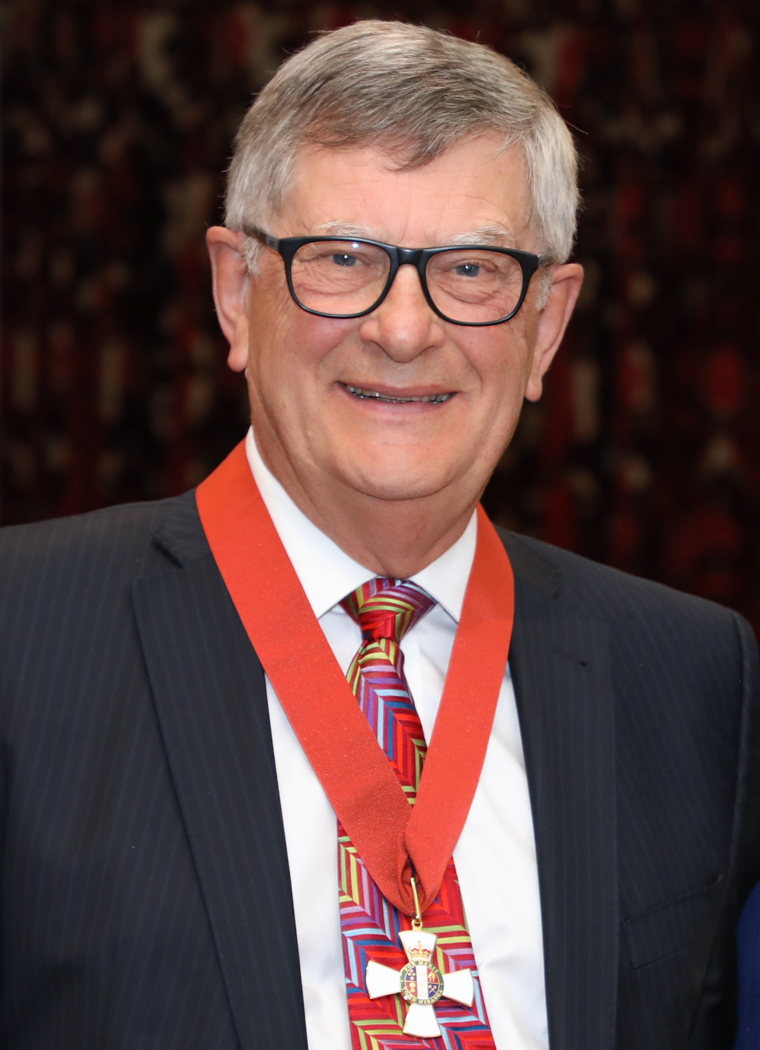
Murray MacCormick

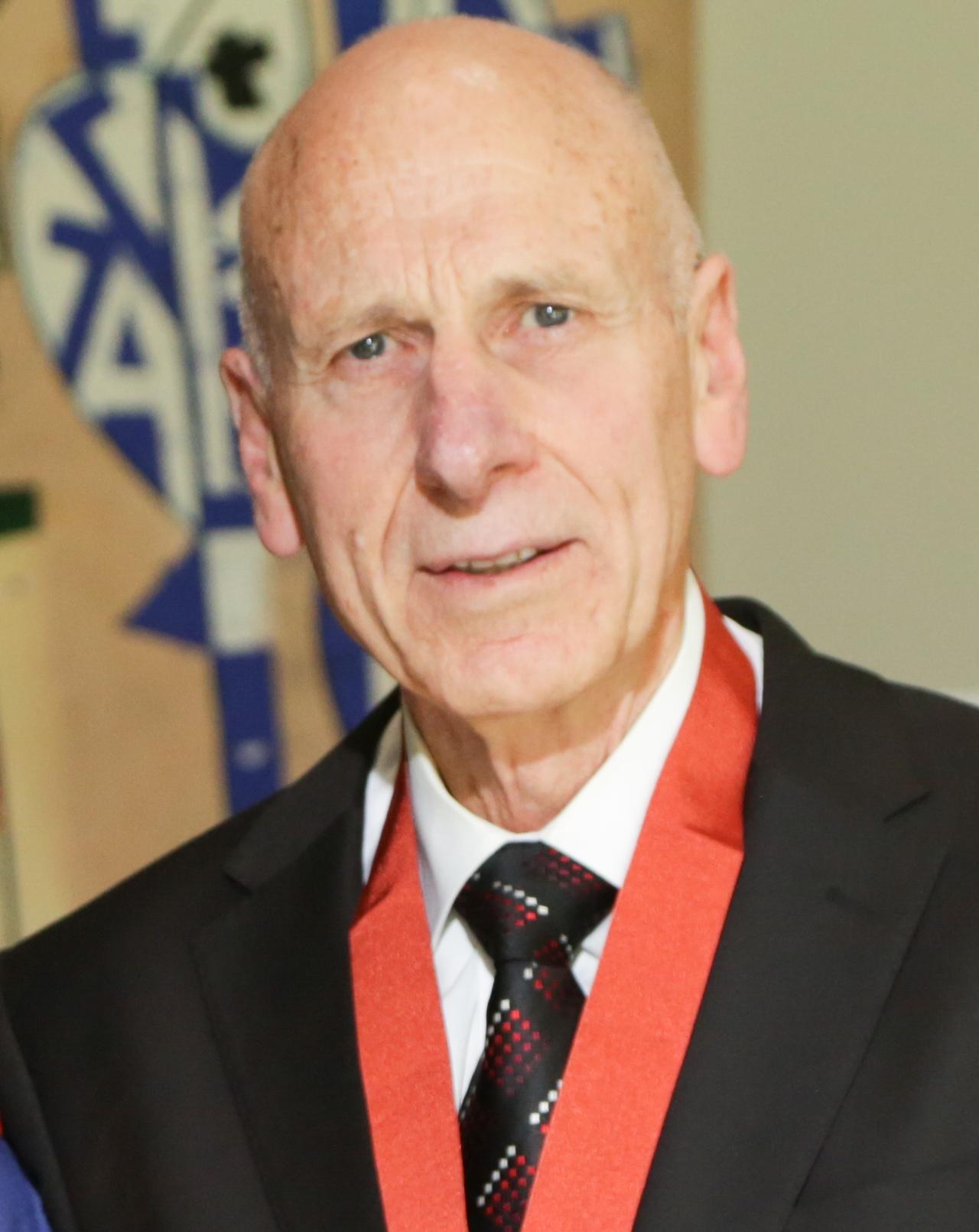
Mike Matthews

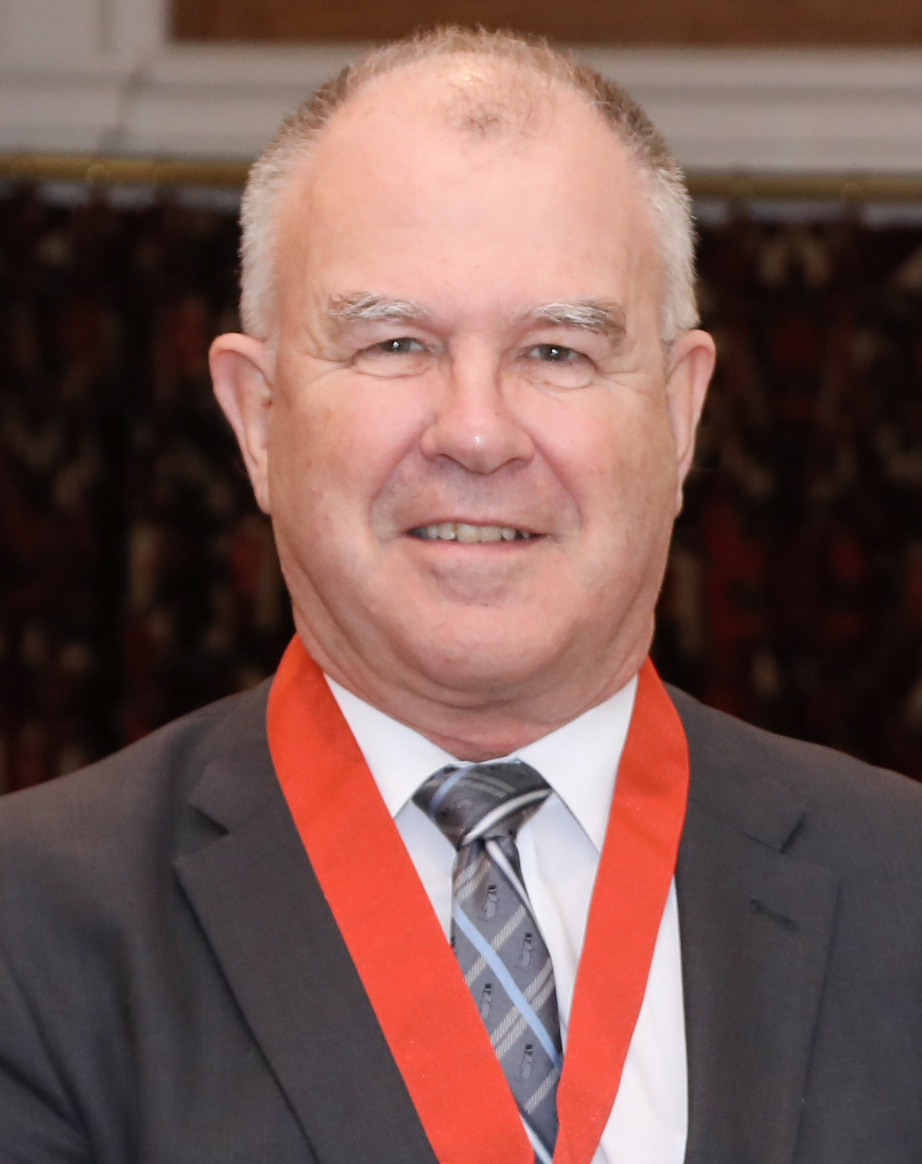
John McKinnon

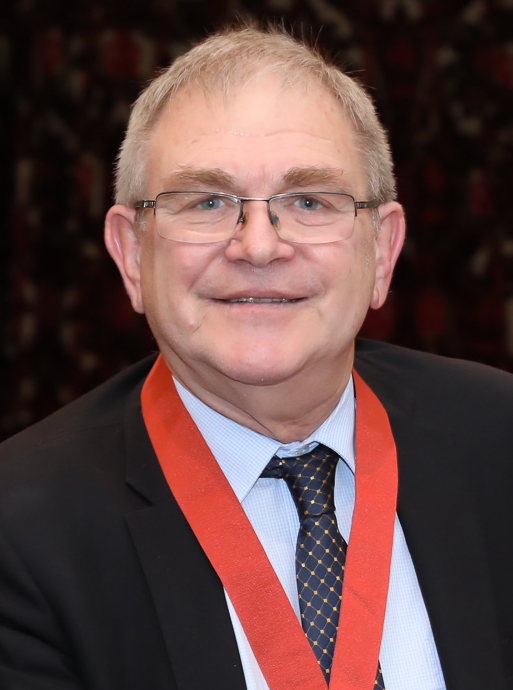
Roger Moses

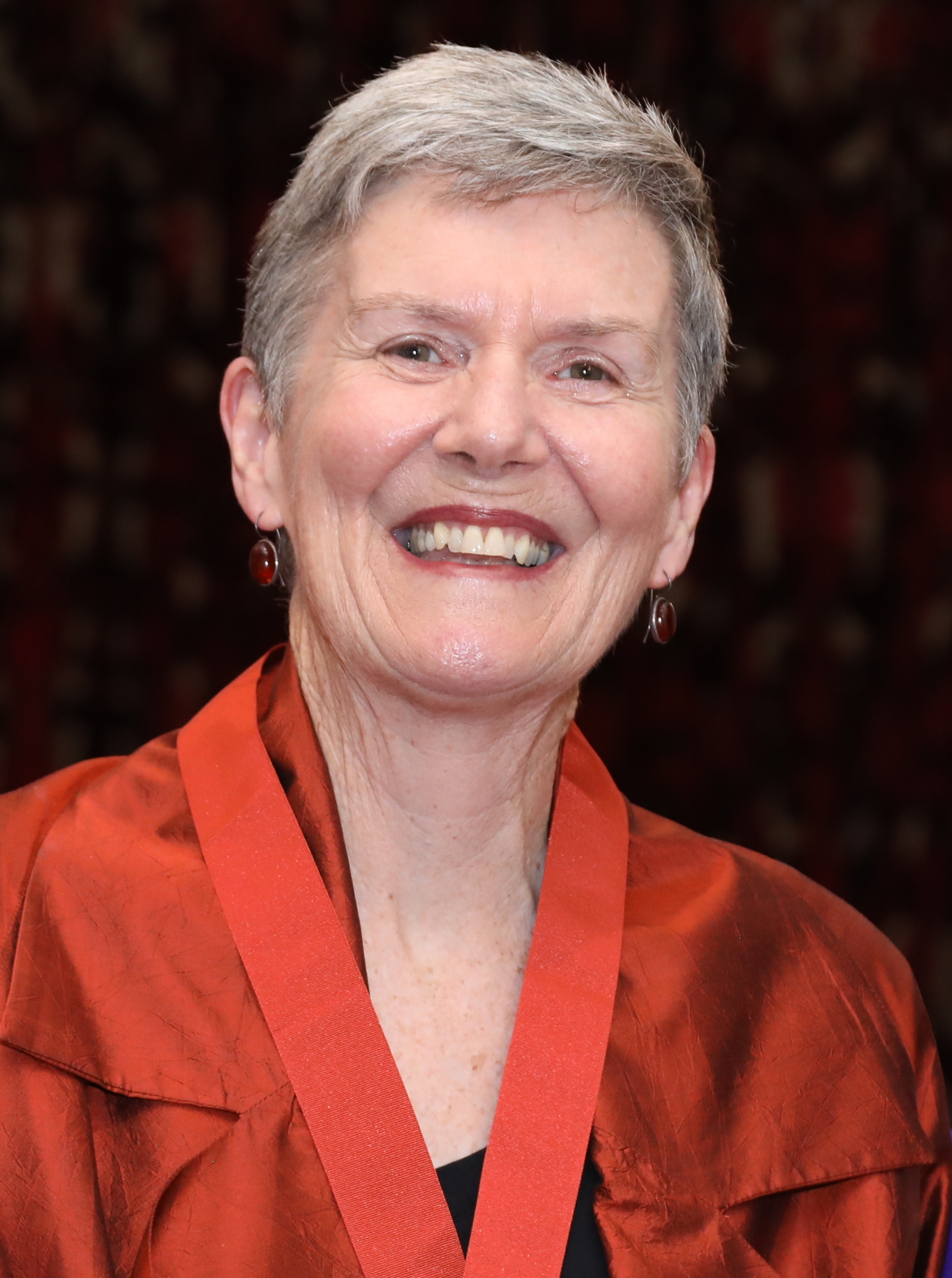
Helen Plume

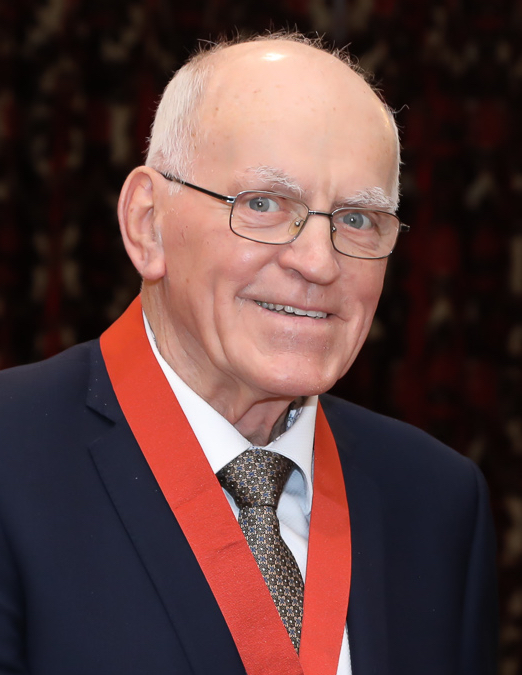
Ted Ward

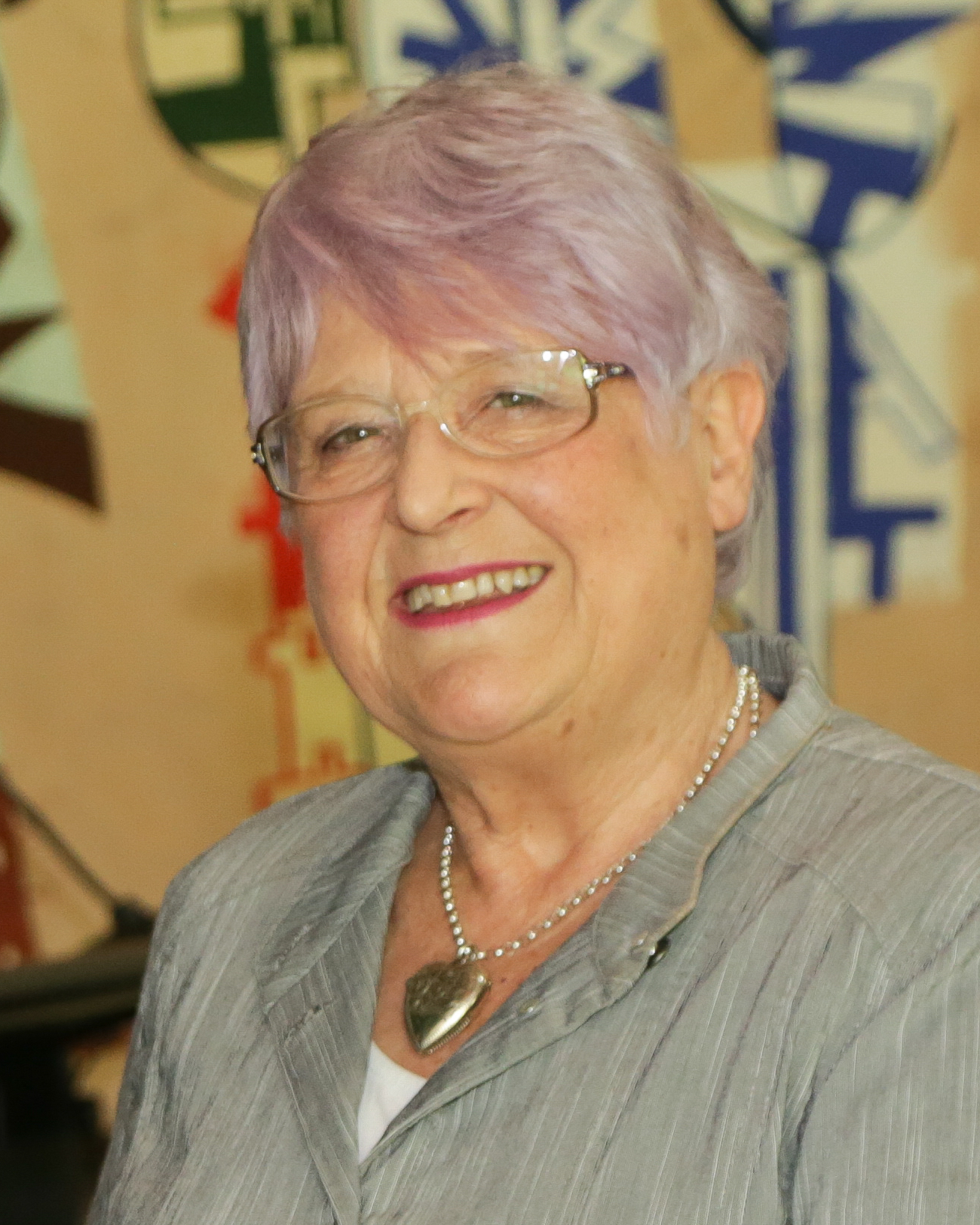
Dianne Webster

=== Officer (ONZM) ===
- Priscilla Jane Askew – of Featherston. For services to music.
- Jan Patricia Bolwell – of Paekākāriki. For services to dance and theatre.
- Lydia Pounamu Bradey – of Lake Hāwea. For services to mountaineering.
- Murray Ernest Cammick – of Wairau Valley, Auckland. For services to the music industry.
- Elizabeth Jane Clark – of Merivale. For services to gymnastics.
- Associate Professor Hendrika Martine Crezee – of Campbells Bay. For services to interpreter and translator education.
- Grant Thomas Crothers – of Te Aro. For services to Tokelau and the fishing industry.
- Dr John Wayne Delahunt – of Melrose. For services to endocrinology and the transgender community.
- Margaret Hine Forsyth – of Hamilton. For services to netball and the community.
- Graeme William Gale – of Outram. For services to aviation and conservation.
- Rosslyn Ann Gale – of Outram. For services to aviation and conservation.
- William Morris Gosden MNZM – of Mount Victoria. For services to the film industry.
- Karyn Lee Maxwell Hay – of Grey Lynn. For services to broadcasting and the music industry.
- Michael Hopkinson – of Murchison. For services to kayaking and outdoor education.
- Dr Harvey Eshkol Indyk – of Hamilton East. For services to analytical chemistry and the dairy industry.
- Susan Jane Kedgley – of Oriental Bay. For services to women and governance.
- Anthony Francis Kokshoorn – of Greymouth. For services to local government and the community.
- Laura Robyn Langman – of Flagstaff, Hamilton. For services to netball.
- Dr George William Mason – of New Plymouth. For services to conservation, philanthropy and the community.
- Paul McGill – of Warkworth. For services to Fire and Emergency New Zealand.
- Amanda Elizabeth Anngold McIntosh – of Avondale. For services to early childhood education.
- Annette Margaret Milligan – of Nelson. For services to health, particularly nursing.
- Robert Narev MNZM – of Saint Heliers. For services to the community and education.
- Rānui Ngārimu – of Christchurch. For services to Māori art and culture, particularly weaving.
- Shaun Michael Norman – of Twizel. For services to mountaineering, alpine safety and the community.
- Dr Keith William Ovenden – of Brooklyn. For services to the arts.
- Susan Diana Price – of Kelburn. For services to literature and philanthropy.
- Lynden Ann Sainsbury – of Remuera. For services to philanthropy and the community.
- Mary Gemma Schumacher – of Oriental Bay. For services to palliative care.
- Emeritus Professor Warwick Bruce Silvester – of Chartwell. For services to science and conservation.
- Suzanne Mary Sinclair – of Avondale. For services to the community and governance.
- Stephen John Tew – of Seatoun. For services to rugby and sports administration.
- Reverend Nove Vailaau – of Waitangirua. For services to the Samoan community.
- Shayne William Walker – of Dunedin. For services to fostering children and social work.
- Anthony Gordon Wilding – of Tīrau. For services to the dairy industry and the community.
- Gary Ross Wilson – of Pukekohe. For services to Māori and Pacific journalism and broadcasting.
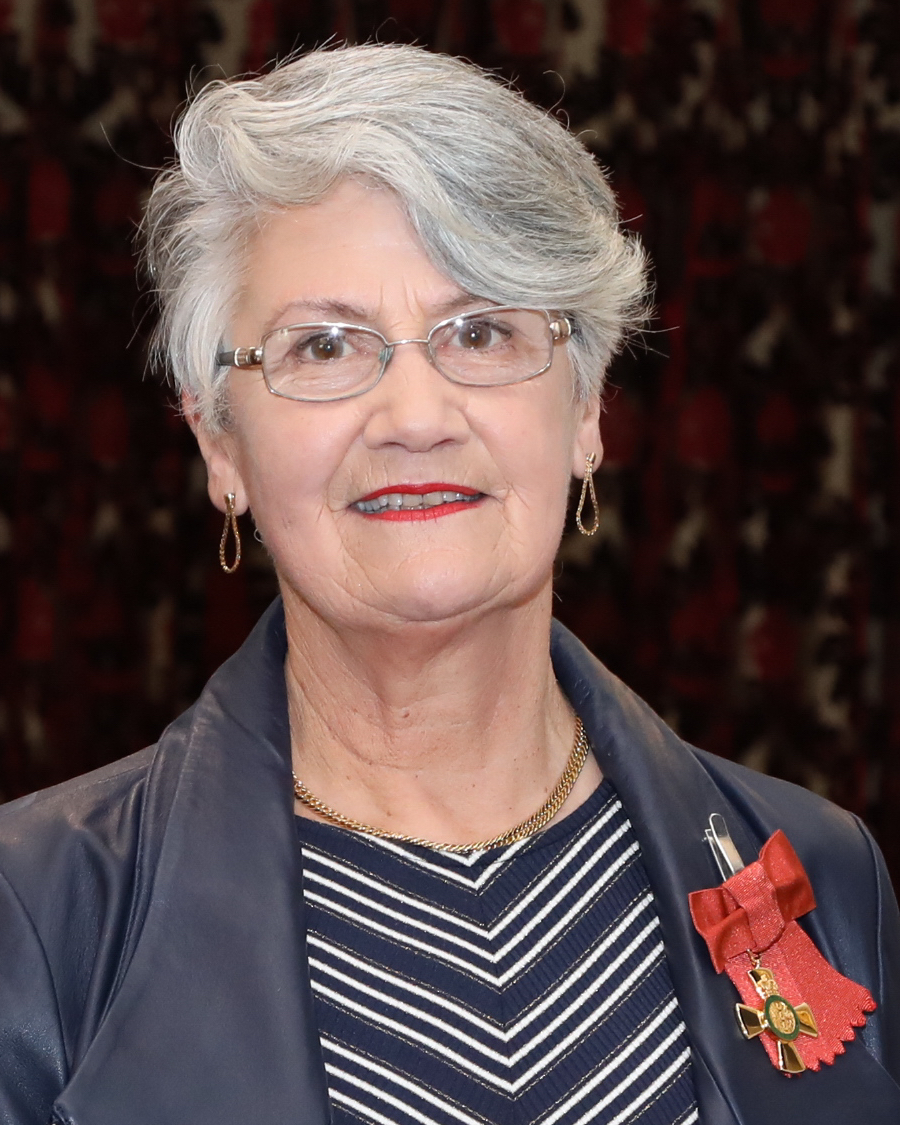
Jan Bolwell

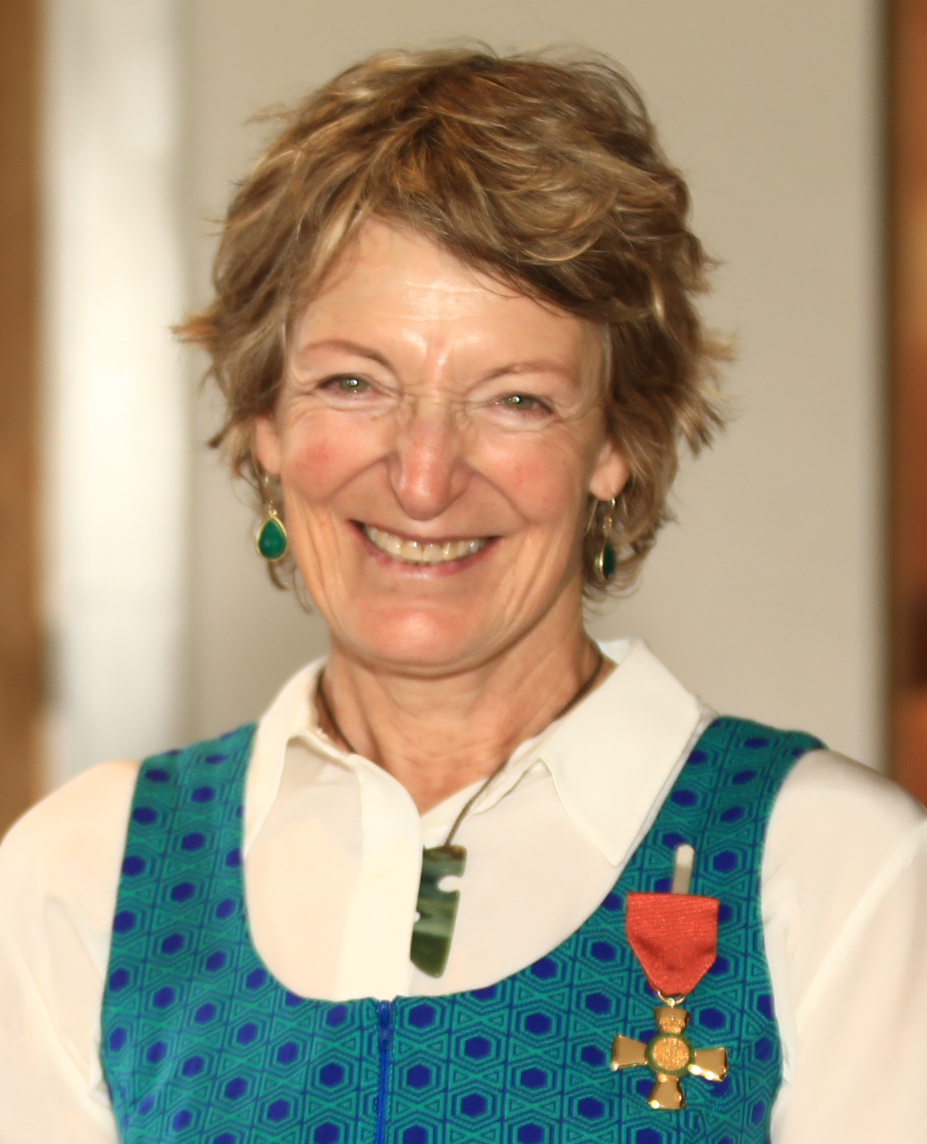
Lydia Bradey

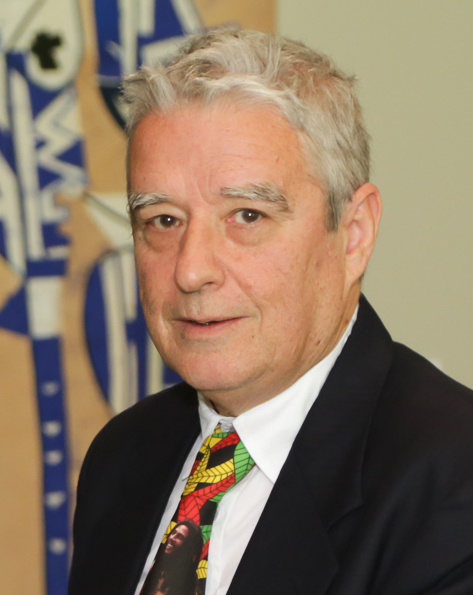
Murray Cammick

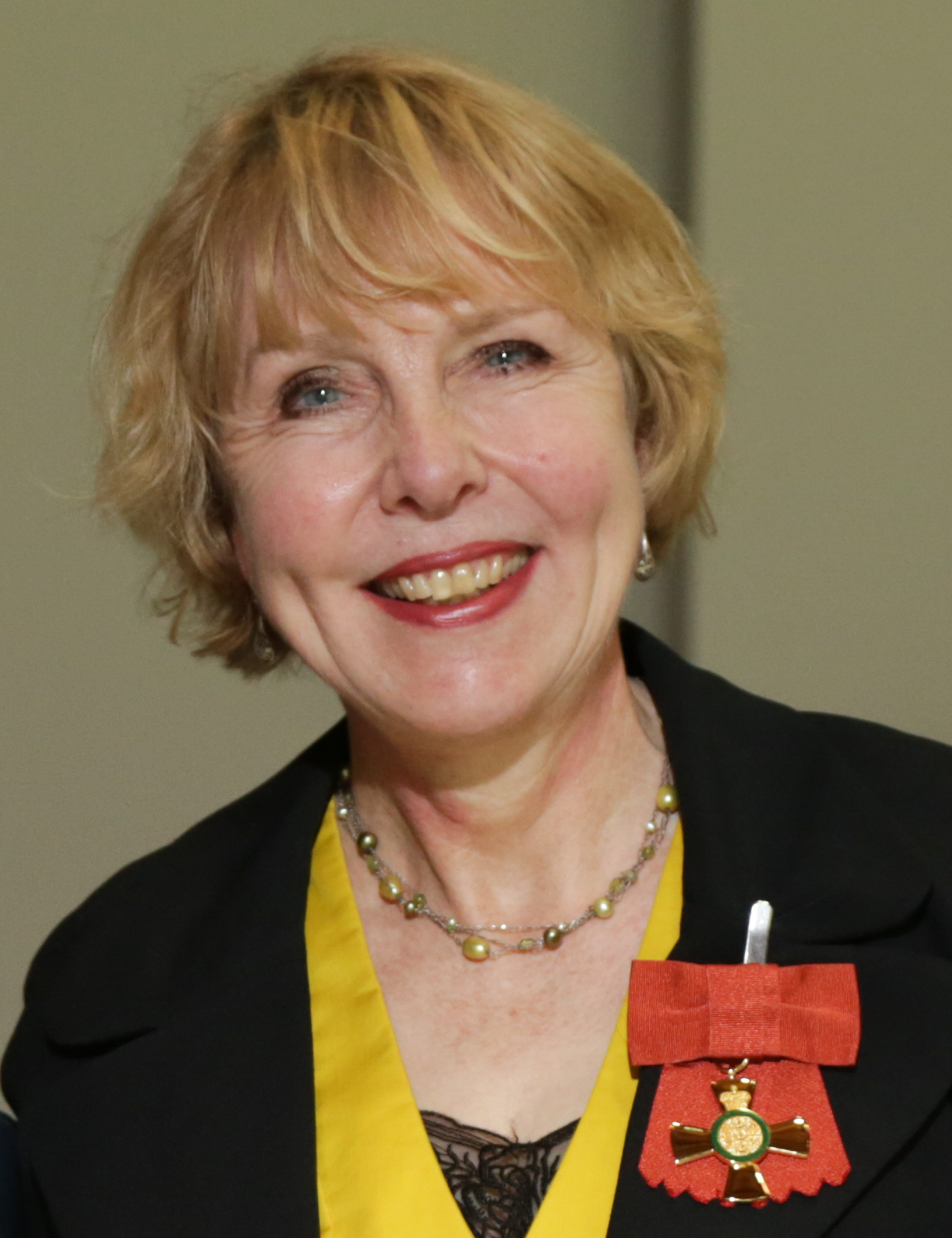
Ineke Crezee

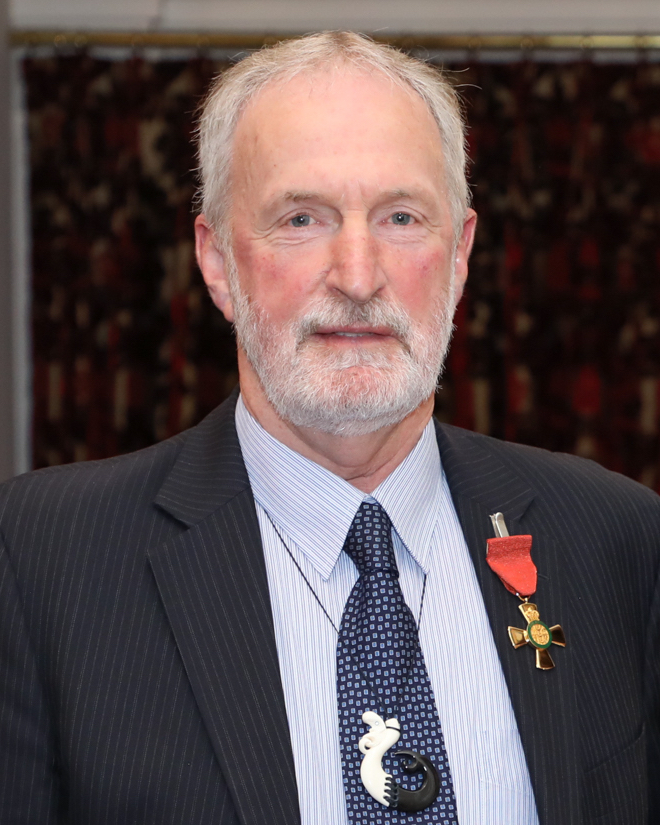
Grant Crothers

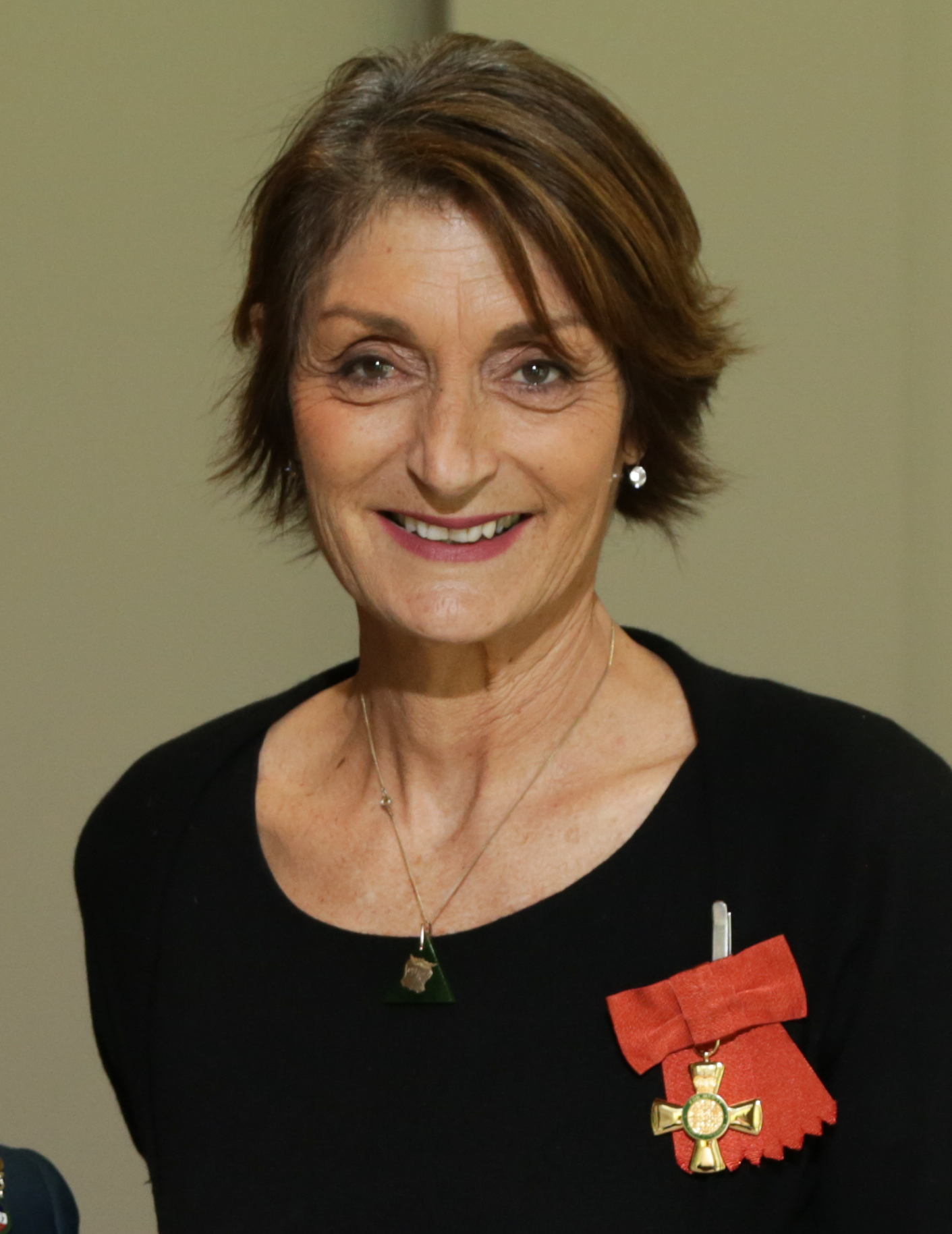
Margaret Forsyth

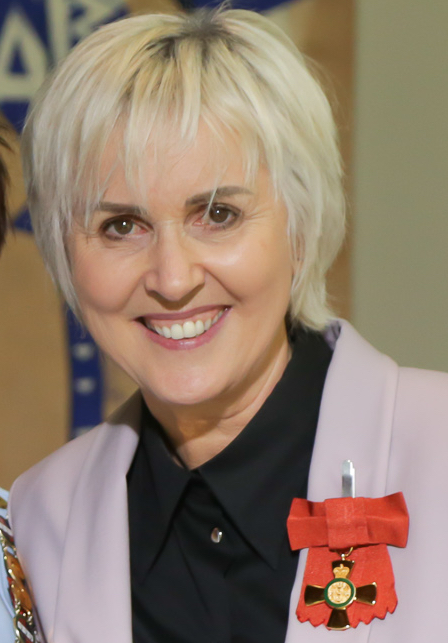
Karyn Hay

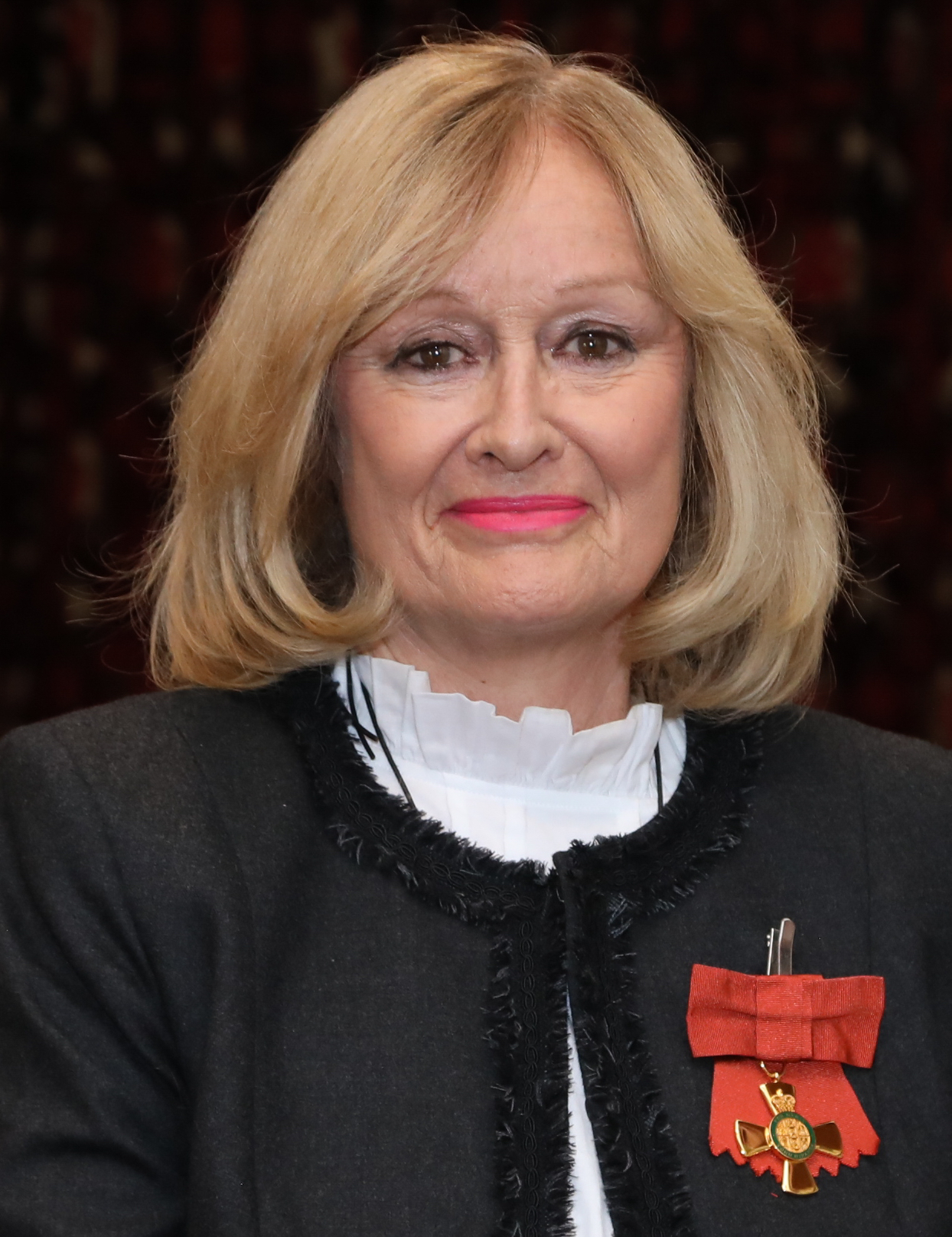
Sue Kedgley

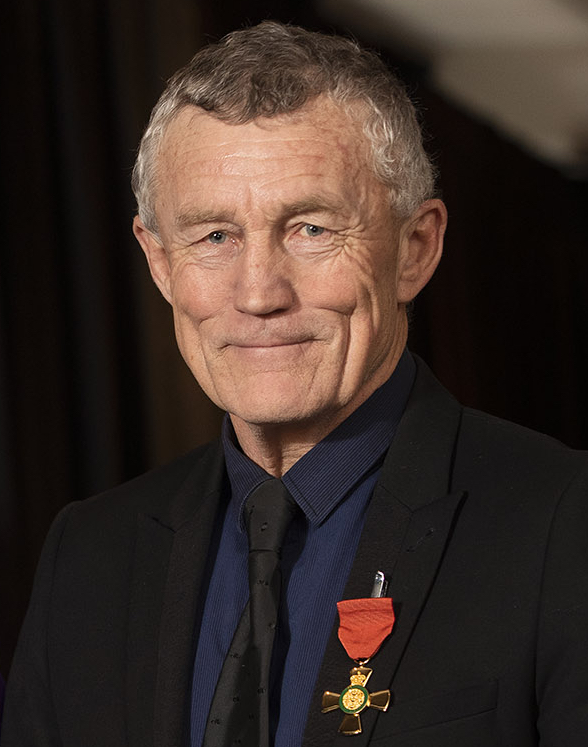
Tony Kokshoorn

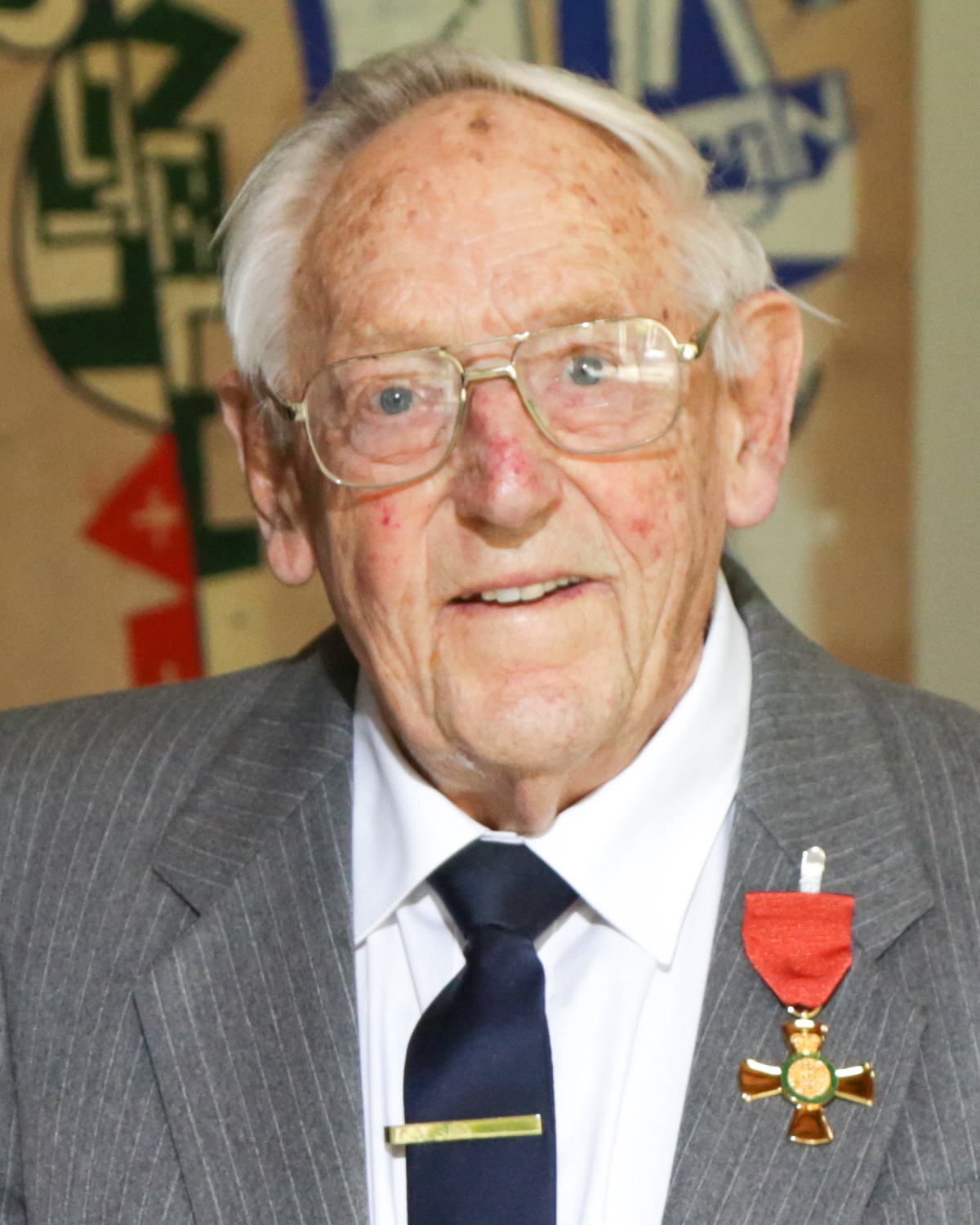
George Mason

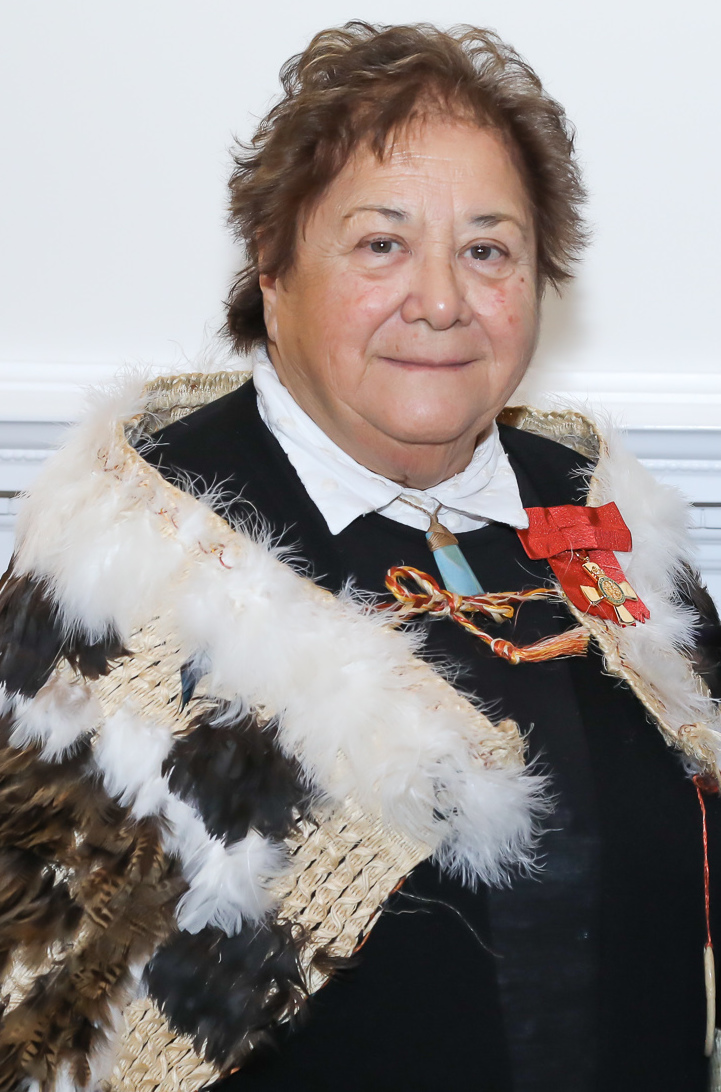
Rānui Ngārimu

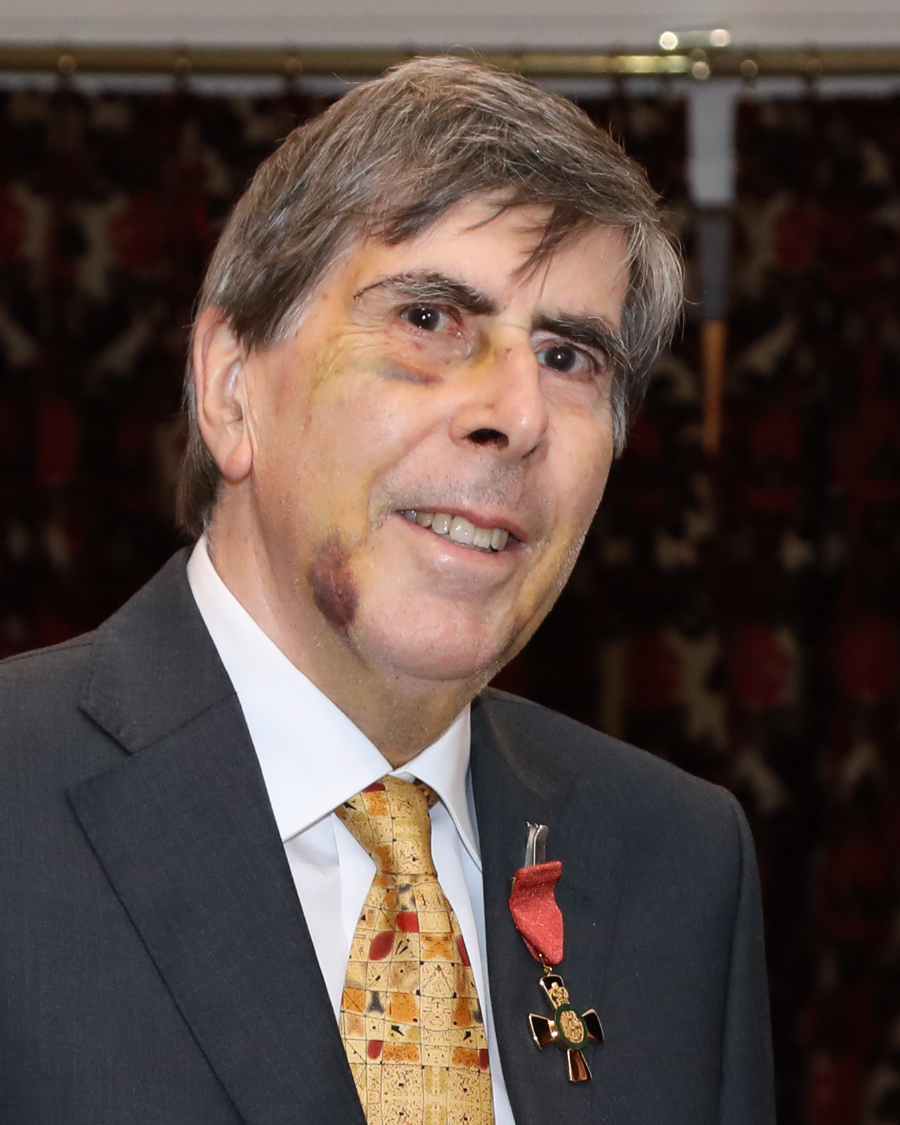
Keith Ovenden

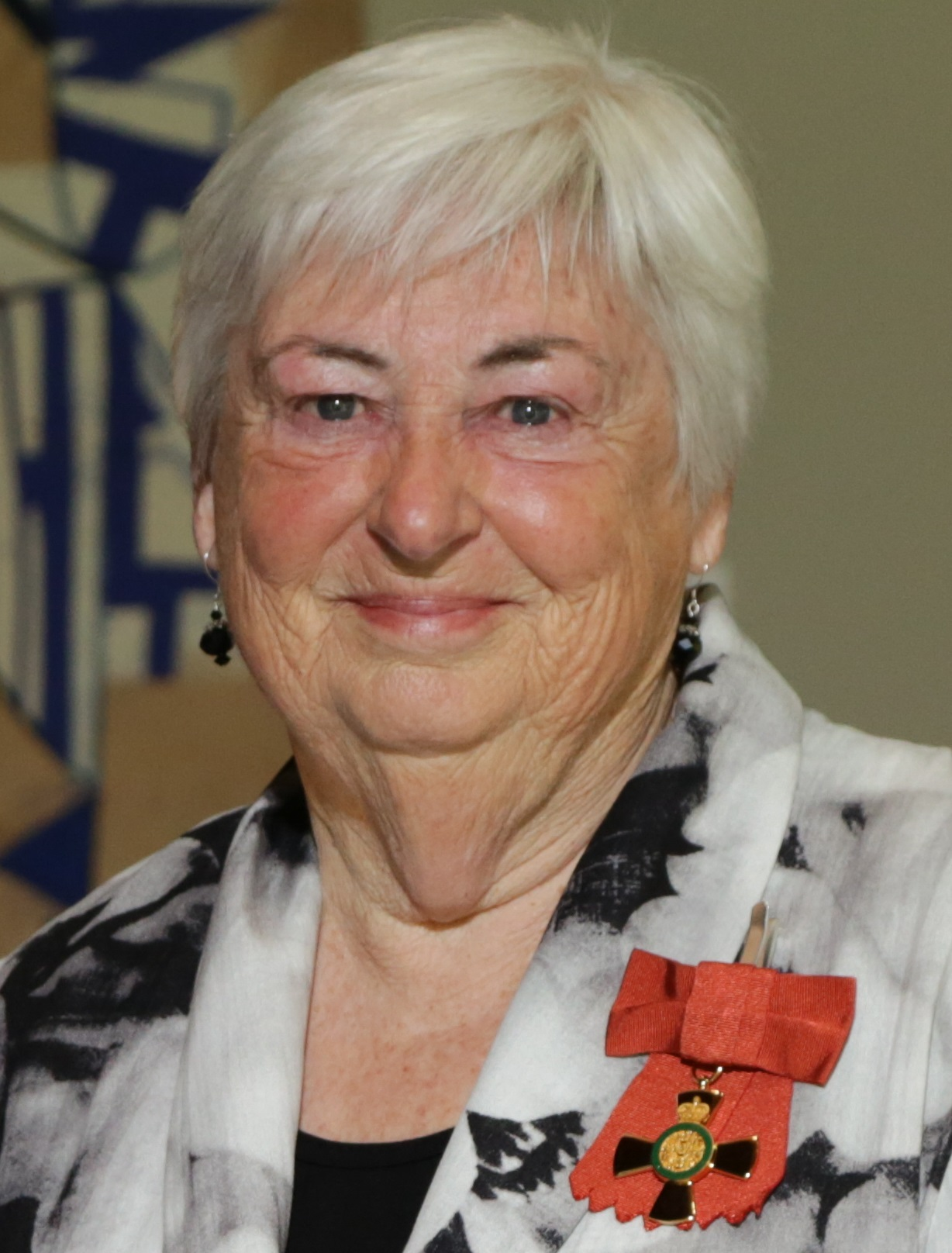
Suzanne Sinclair

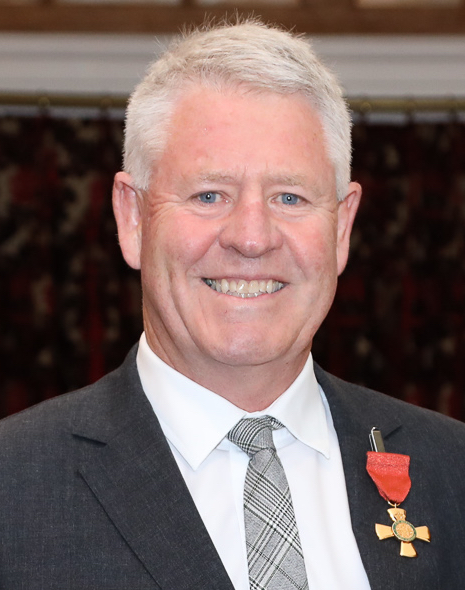
Steve Tew

Shayne Walker

=== Member (MNZM) ===
- Dr Anne Bardsley – of Castor Bay. For services to science and the state.
- Peter Richard Barker – of Brooklyn. For services to the community.
- Gillian Margaret Bibby – of Roseneath. For services to music and music education.
- Lauren Marie Boyle – of Whenuapai. For services to swimming.
- Sulieti Fieme'a Burrows – of Manurewa. For services to Tongan art and education.
- George Leonard Burt – of Katikati. For services to Māori and broadcasting.
- Susan Mary Cameron (Susan Boland) – of Hillsborough, Auckland. For services to music and seniors.
- Marilyn Joy Cassidy – of Clyde. For services to dance.
- Gerben Willem Cath – of Takapuna. For services to the screen industry and education.
- George Sheung Hung Chan – of Sunnyhills. For services to philanthropy and the community.
- John Anthony Chemis – of Gisborne. For services to education.
- Michael Anthony Chopping – of Remuera. For services to the electrical industry.
- Dr David Anthony Codyre – of Herne Bay. For services to mental health.
- Naomi Frances Cowan – of Torbay. For services to mental health and the community.
- Roy James Cowley – of Wellington. For services to charity governance and the arts.
- Kathleen Mary Craig – of Palmerston North. For services to music and music education.
- Paul Emlyn Crowther – of Mount Eden. For services to music.
- Julia Samantha Durkin – of Hauraki. For services to photography.
- Carrol Margaret Elliott – of Māngere Bridge. For services to nursing and the community.
- Janine Ewan – of Onehunga. For services to palliative care.
- Judith Grace Geare – of Newtown. For services to language education and New Zealand–Germany relations.
- John Grant Gibson – of Greymouth. For services to rugby league.
- Parris Renee Goebel – of Auckland. For services to dance.
- Carole Erna Gordon – of Tauranga. For services to seniors.
- Louise Mary Green – of Johnsonville. For services to education.
- Dr Aroha Gaylene Harris – of Te Atatū South. For services to Māori and historical research.
- Arneta Honey Hireme – of Deanwell. For services to rugby league.
- Jenn Maree Hooper – of Hamilton. For services to maternity care and people with disabilities.
- Penelope Anne Hulse – of Te Atatū Peninsula. For services to local government.
- Reverend Dr Helen Elizabeth Jacobi – of Mount Eden. For services to the Anglican church and the community.
- William John Kerrison – of Murupara. For services to river and wildlife conservation.
- Professor Ngaire Margaret Kerse – of Ponsonby. For services to seniors and health.
- Jennifer Sabina Khan-Janif – of New Windsor. For services to refugee and migrant communities.
- Lealamanu'a Aiga Caroline Mareko – of Porirua. For services to the Pacific community and education.
- Dennis Te Uhi Marsh – of Pukekohe. For services to music and fundraising.
- Associate Professor Humaira Moeed – of Naenae. For services to science education and the community.
- Ruth Suzanne Money – of Ponsonby. For services to victim advocacy.
- Linley May Myers – of Northcote Point. For services to education.
- Jennifer Ann Noble – of Tauranga. For services to health, particularly research for rare diseases.
- Graeme Frederick North – of Warkworth. For services to architecture and natural building standards.
- Donald Peter O'Connor – of New Plymouth. For services to motorsport.
- Patrick Leo Michael O'Connor – of Merivale. For services to migrant communities and education.
- Tamsin Orr-Walker – of Queenstown. For services to kea conservation.
- Yvonne Shirley Ann Palmer QSM – of Papanui. For services to seniors and the community.
- Geoffrey Robert Pearman – of Sawyers Bay. For services to seniors and business.
- Hadleigh Jayton Richard Pierson – of Sockburn. For services to paralympic sport.
- Kim Leslie Robinson – of Whangārei. For services to the deaf community.
- Donald William Scarlet – of Hamilton. For services to conservation.
- Grant William Rowan Sidaway – of Brooklyn. For services to seniors and ICT education.
- Senior Sergeant Bryan Martin Smith – of Hastings. For services to the New Zealand Police and the community.
- Pauline Alice Roycroft Stansfield – of Belmont, Auckland. For services to people with disabilities.
- Clayton Trevor Arthur Stent – of Taupō. For services to the community and governance.
- Jennifer Ann Thompson – of Avalon. For services to amputees and horticulture.
- Sonia Faiga Tiatia – of Kilbirnie. For services to hospitality and youth.
- Tiatia Ieti Fale Tiatia – of Johnsonville. For services to sport and the Samoan community.
- Marama Amiria Tuuta – of Masterton. For services to Māori and education.
- Wendy Joy Ure – of Gisborne. For services to early childhood education.
- Lucy Whittingham (Lucy Addison) – of Browns Bay. For services to the deafblind community.
- Gordon Alan Wilson – of Wakari. For services to education.
- David Philip Wright – of Hataitai. For services to biodynamic agriculture.
- Paul Dudley Wright – of Rotorua. For services to Fire and Emergency New Zealand and the forestry industry.
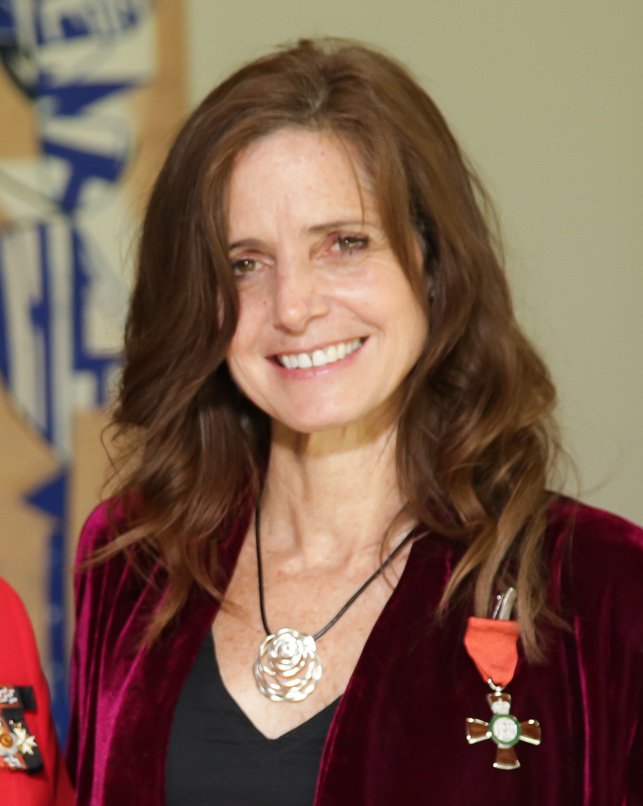
Anne Bardsley

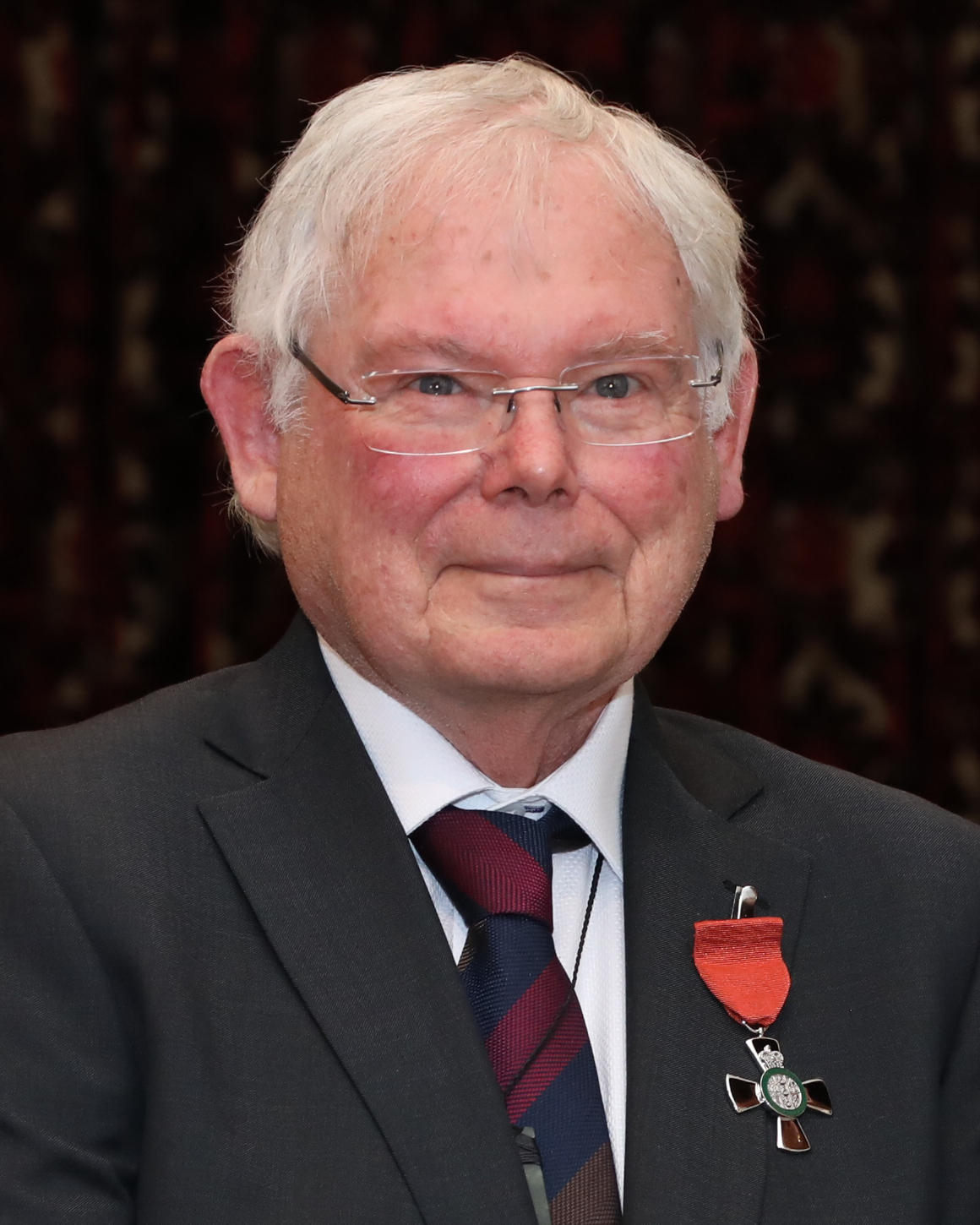
Peter Barker

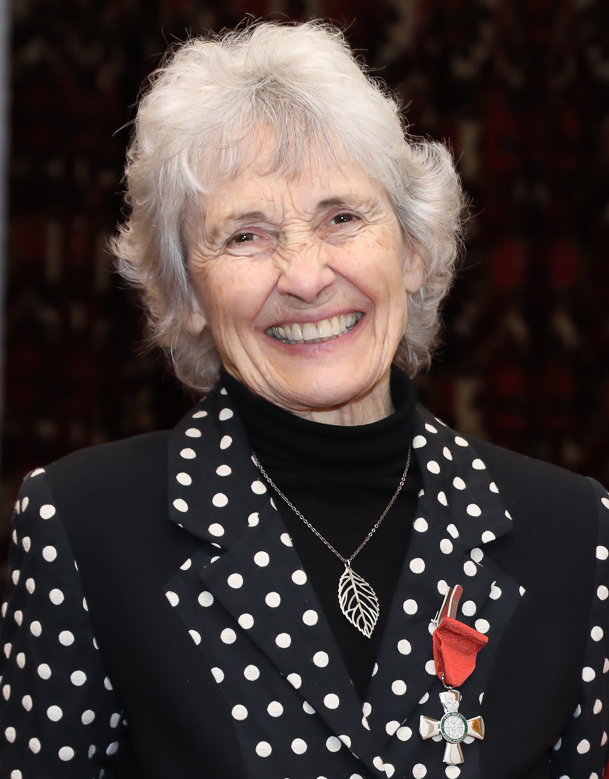
Gillian Bibby

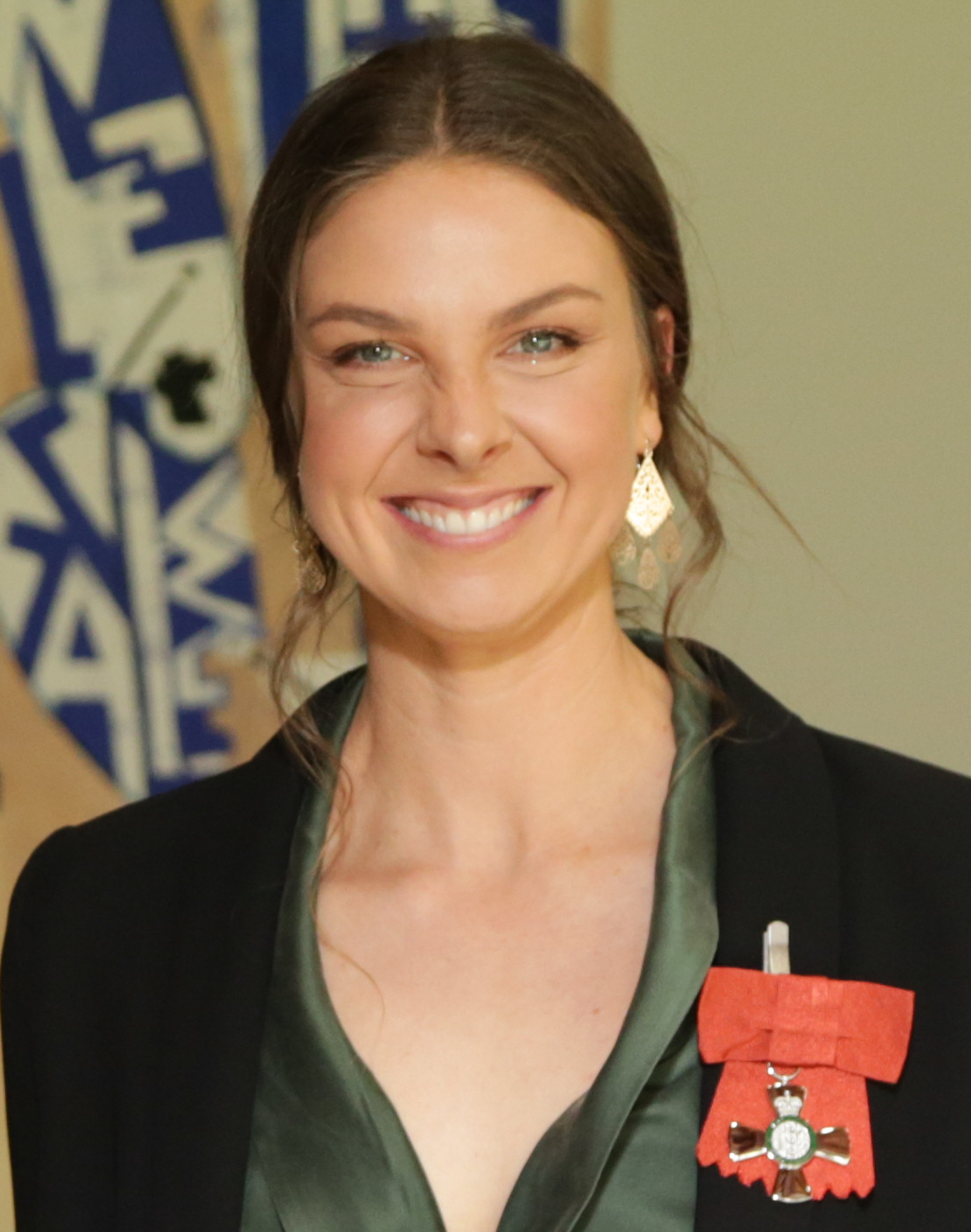
Lauren Boyle

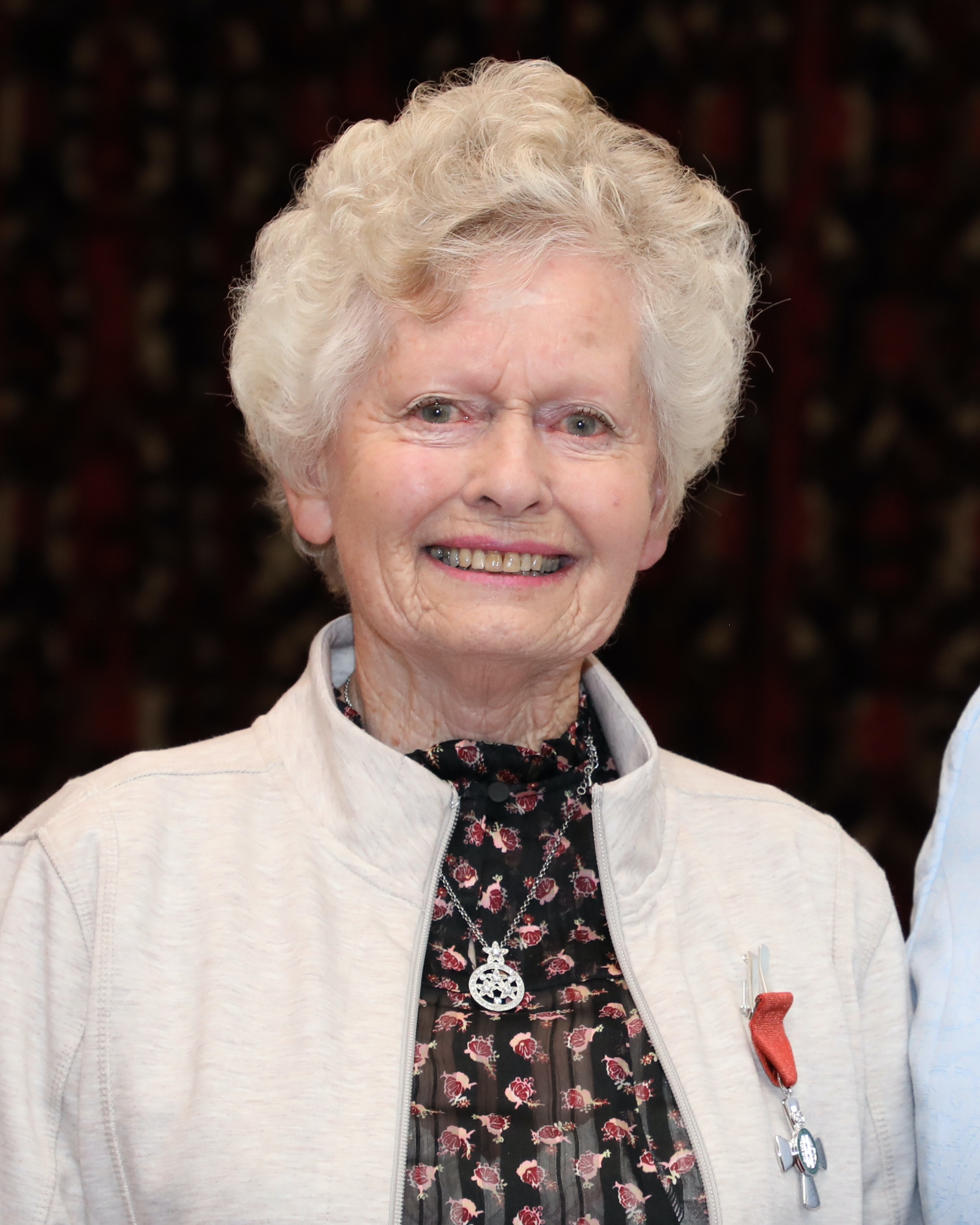
Marilyn Cassidy

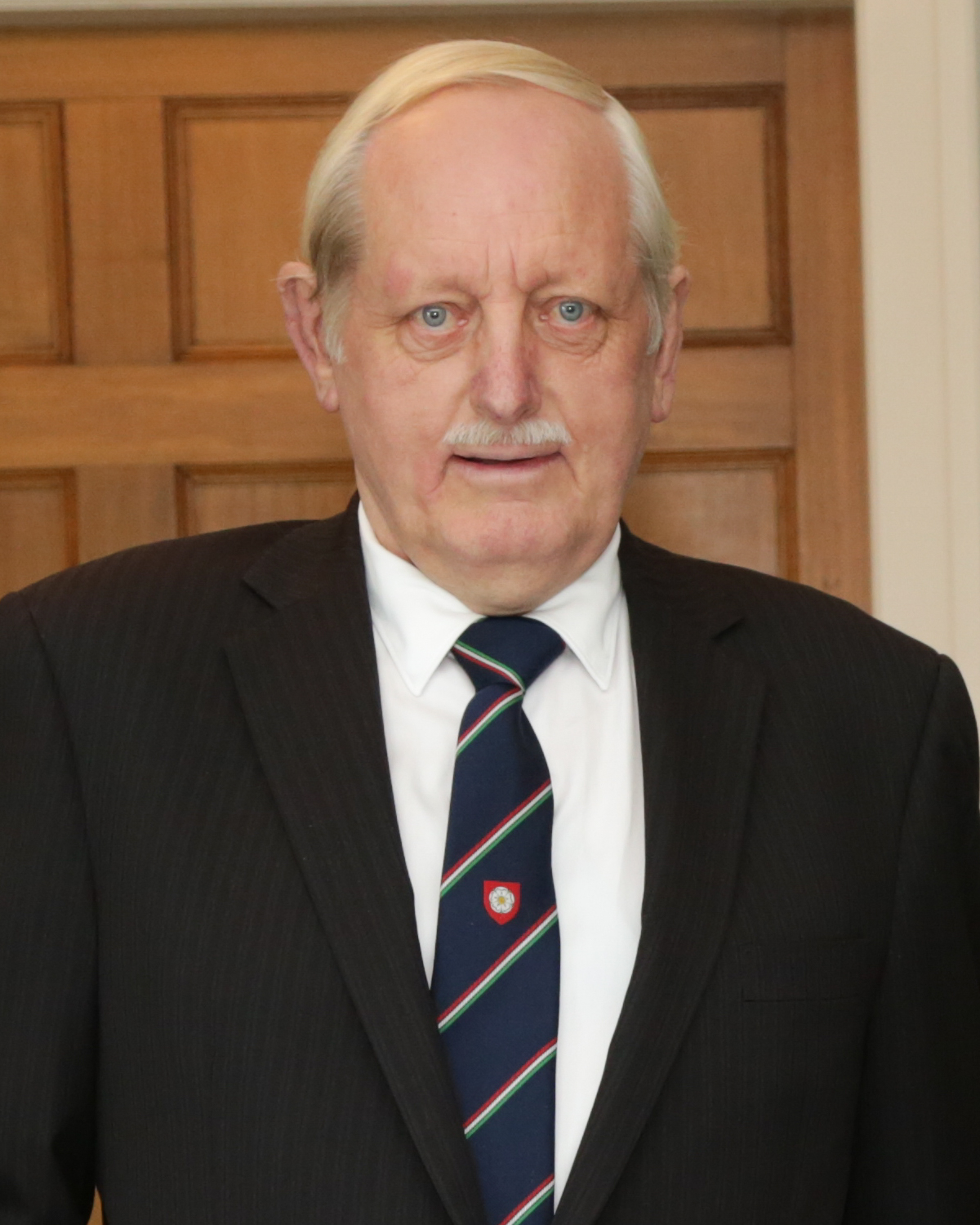
Michael Chopping

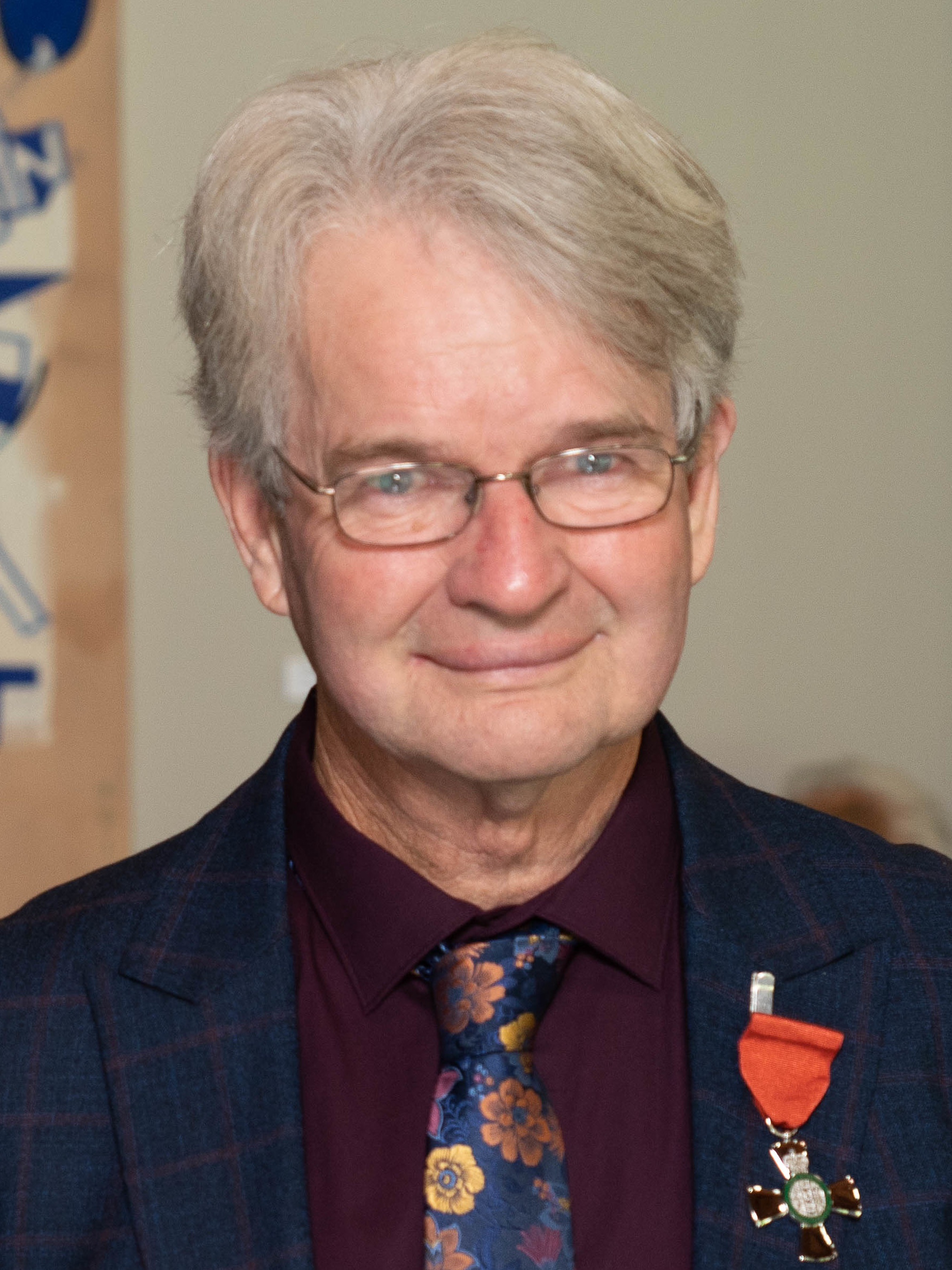
Emlyn Crowther

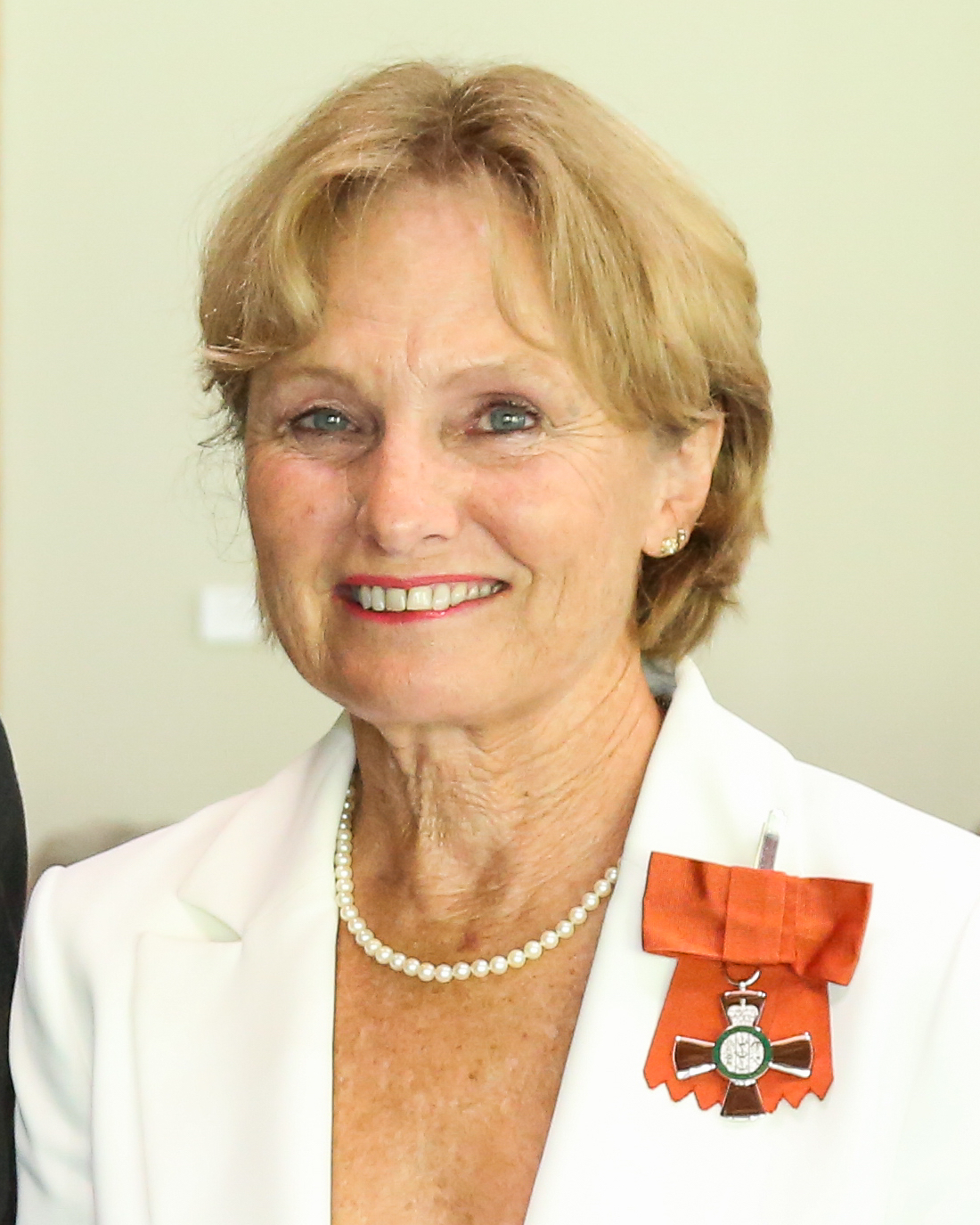
Janine Ewan

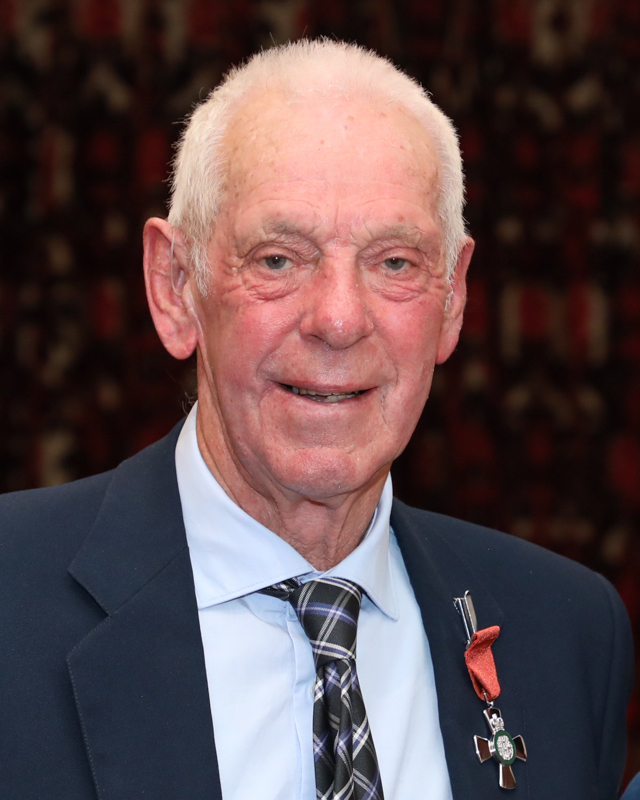
Grant Gibson

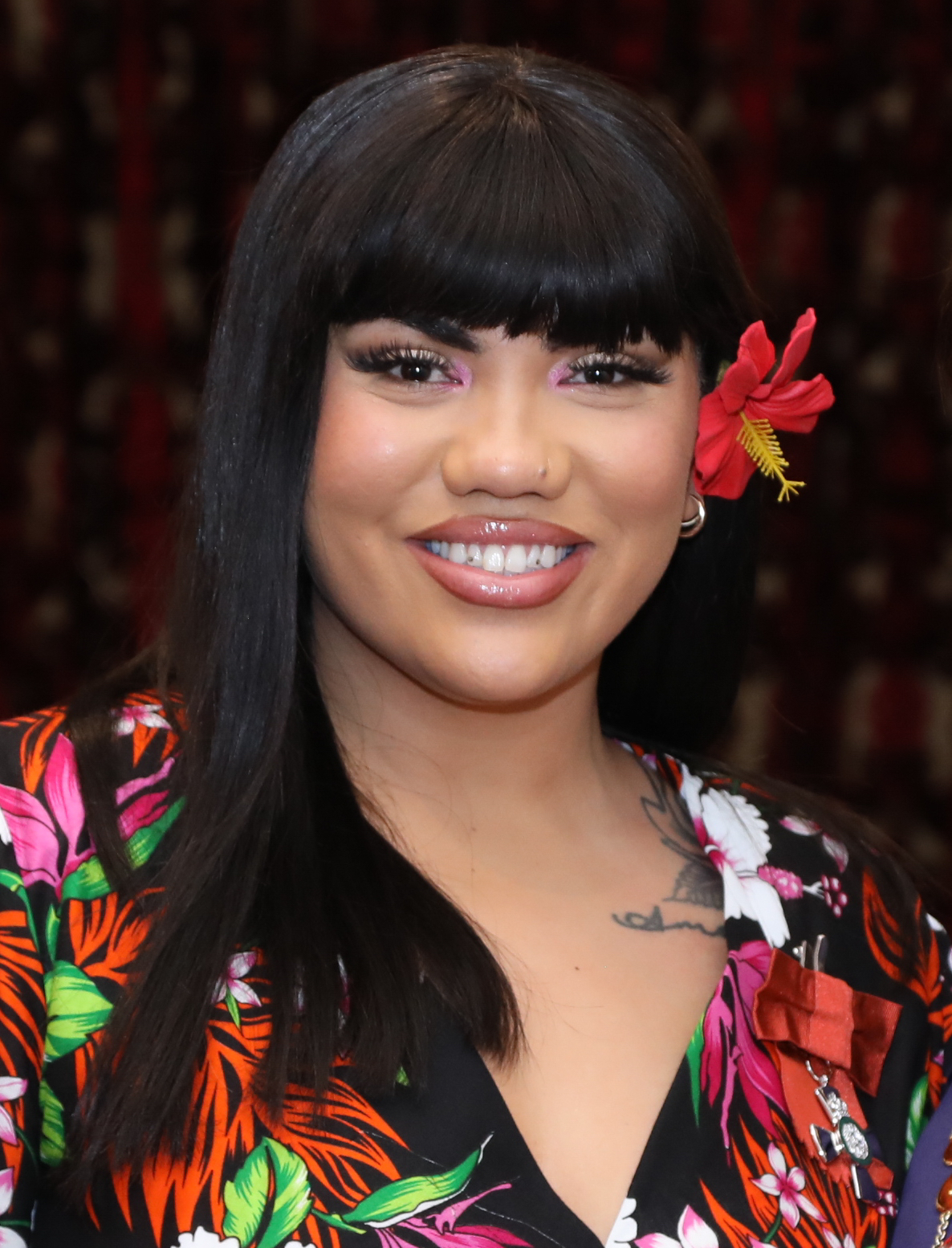
Parris Goebel

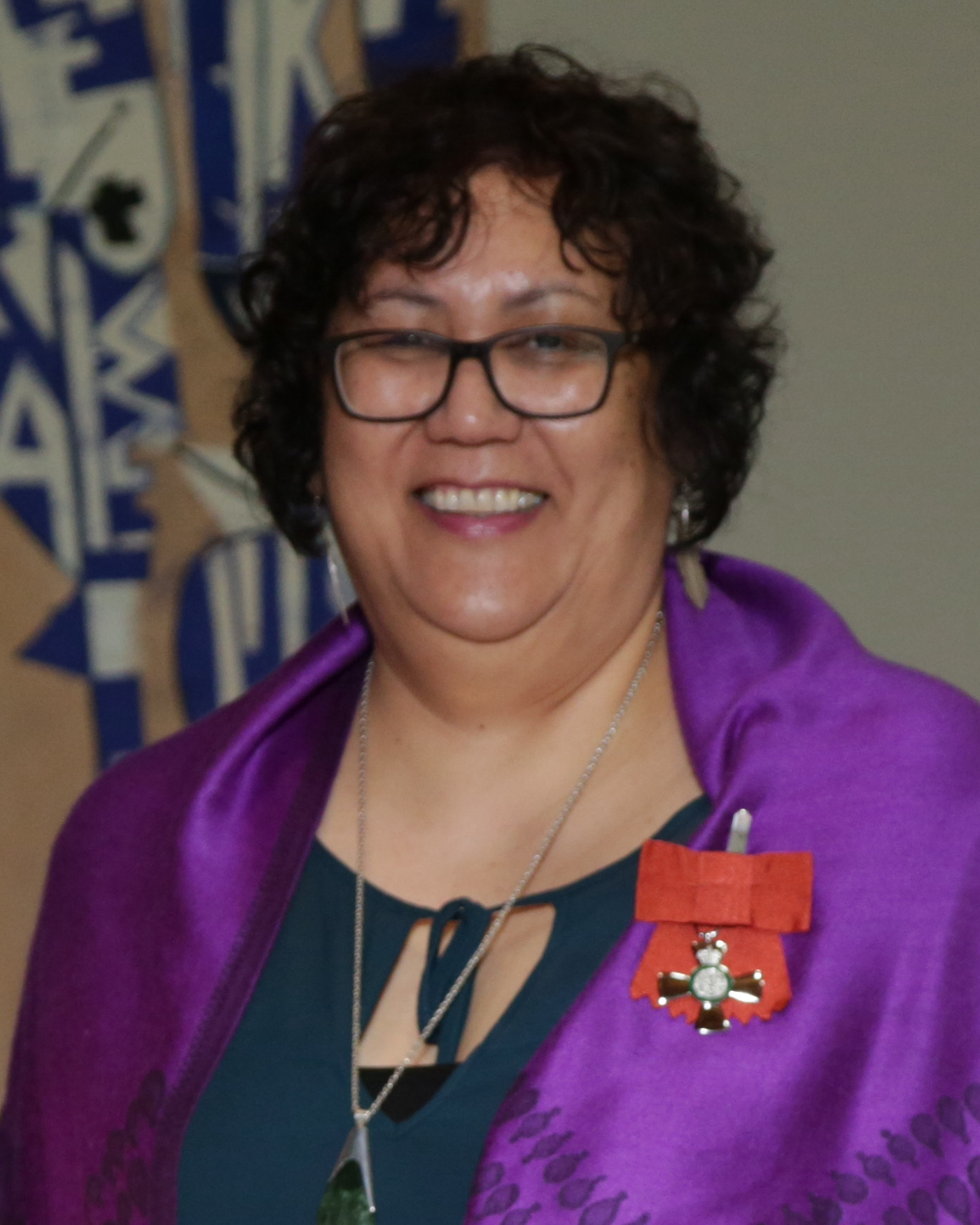
Aroha Harris

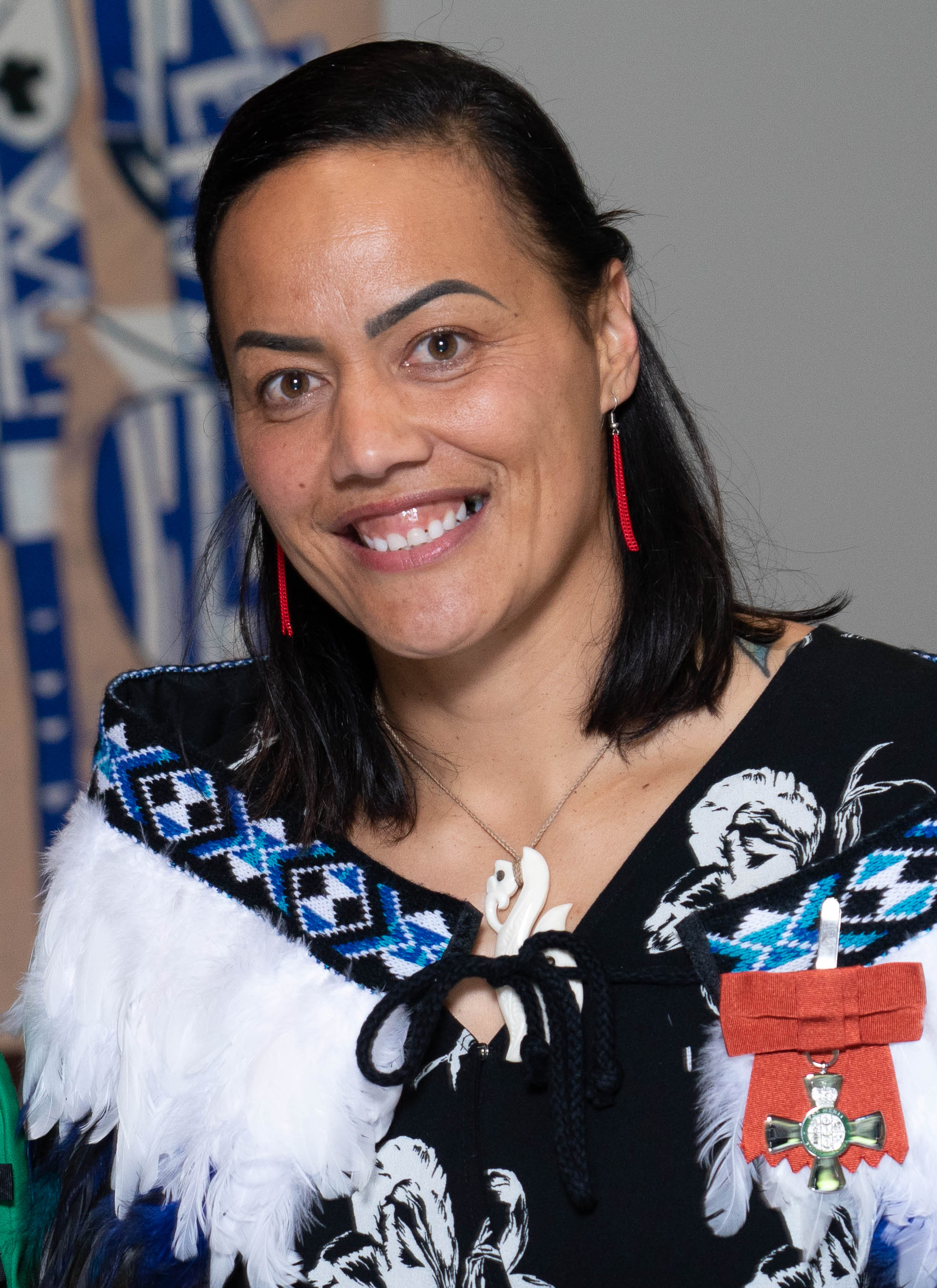
Honey Hireme

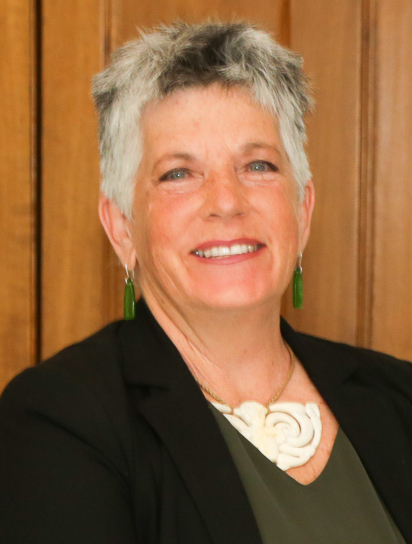
Penny Hulse

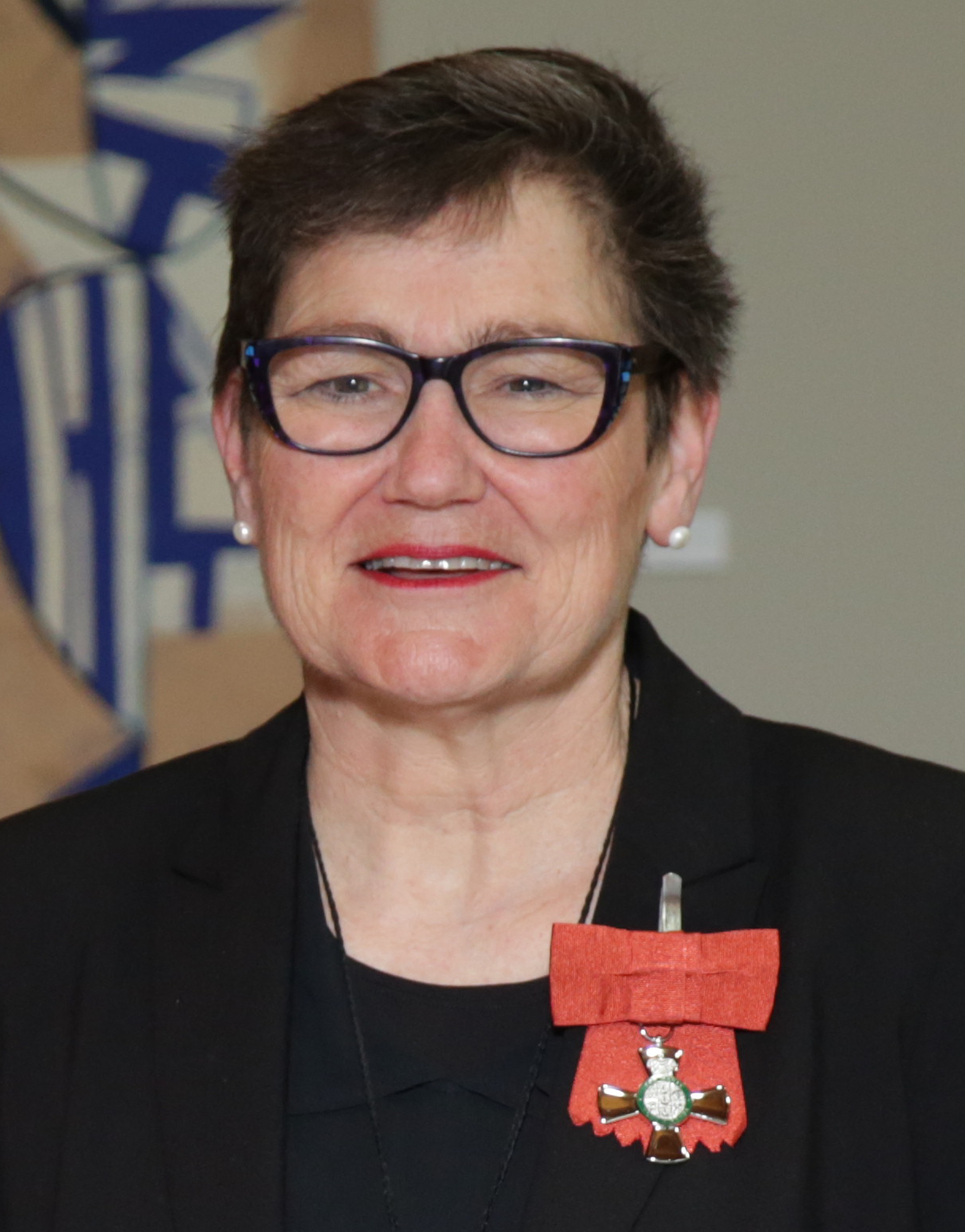
Ngaire Kerse

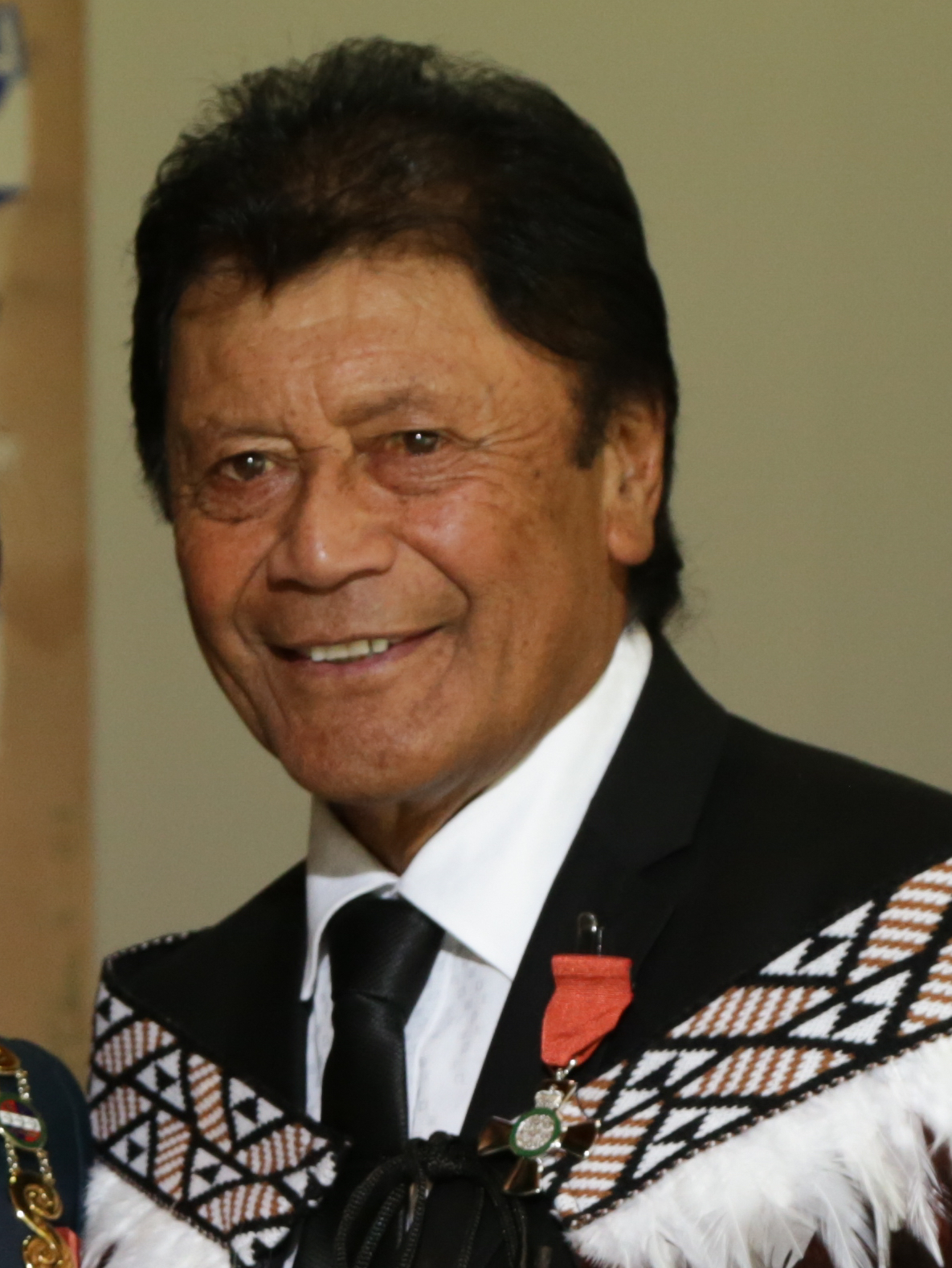
Dennis Marsh

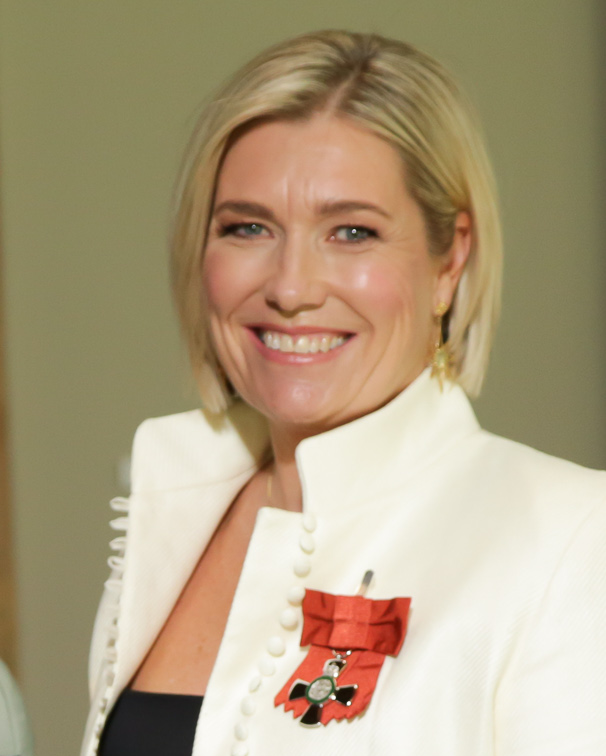
Ruth Money

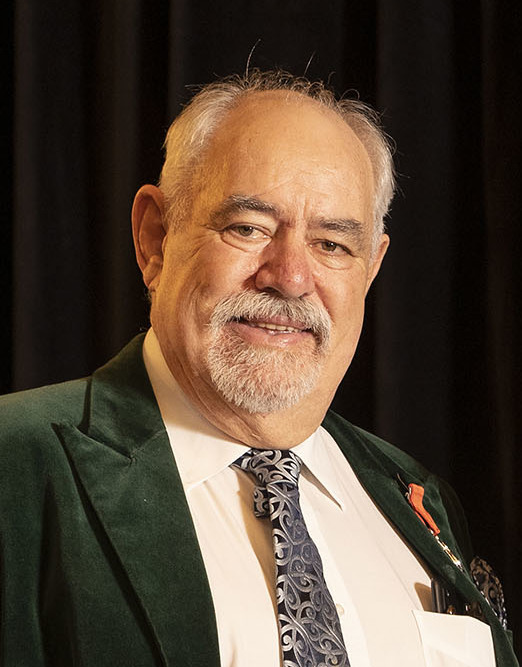
Patrick O'Connor

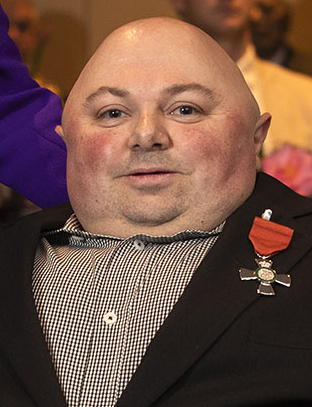
Hadleigh Pierson

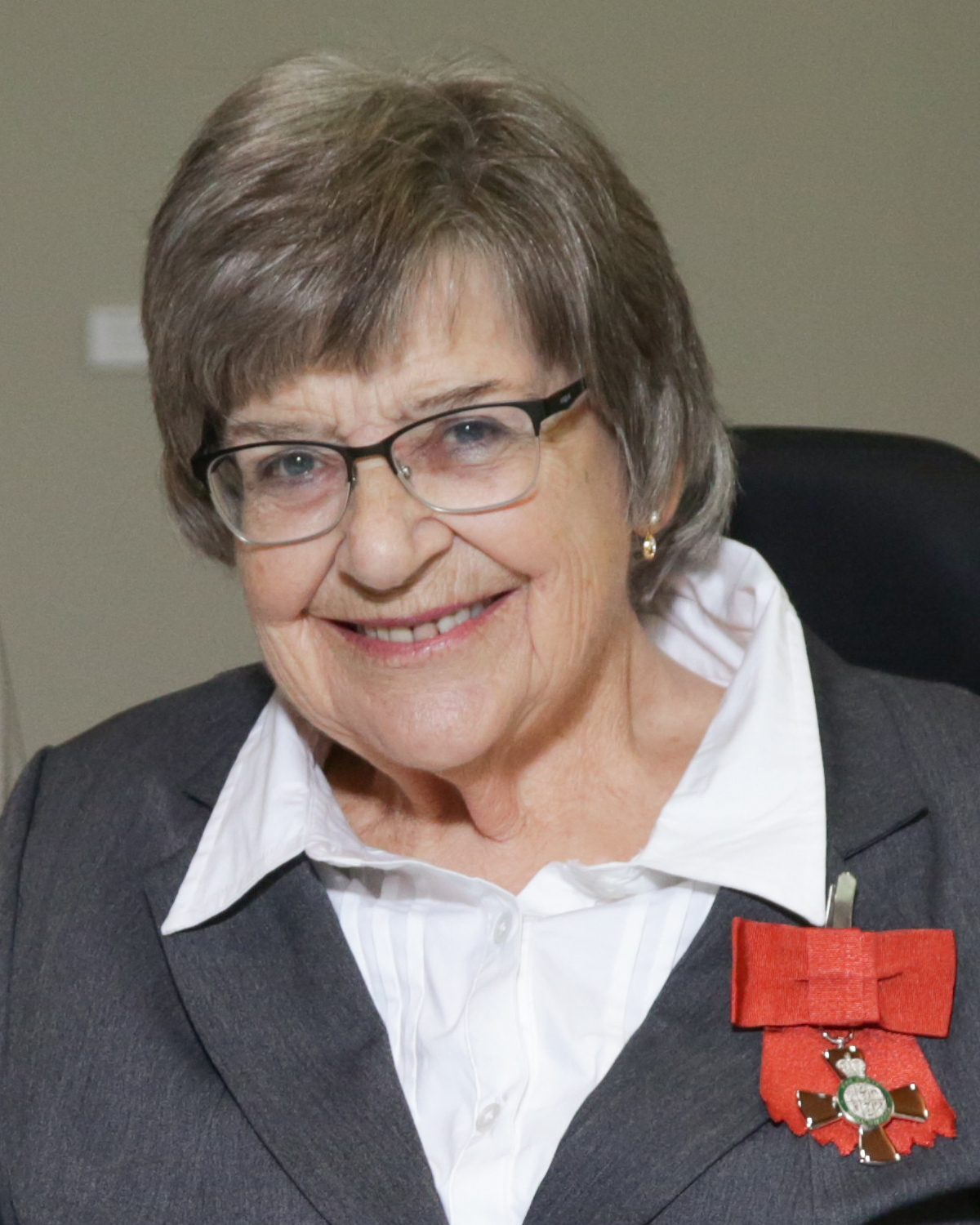
Pauline Stansfield

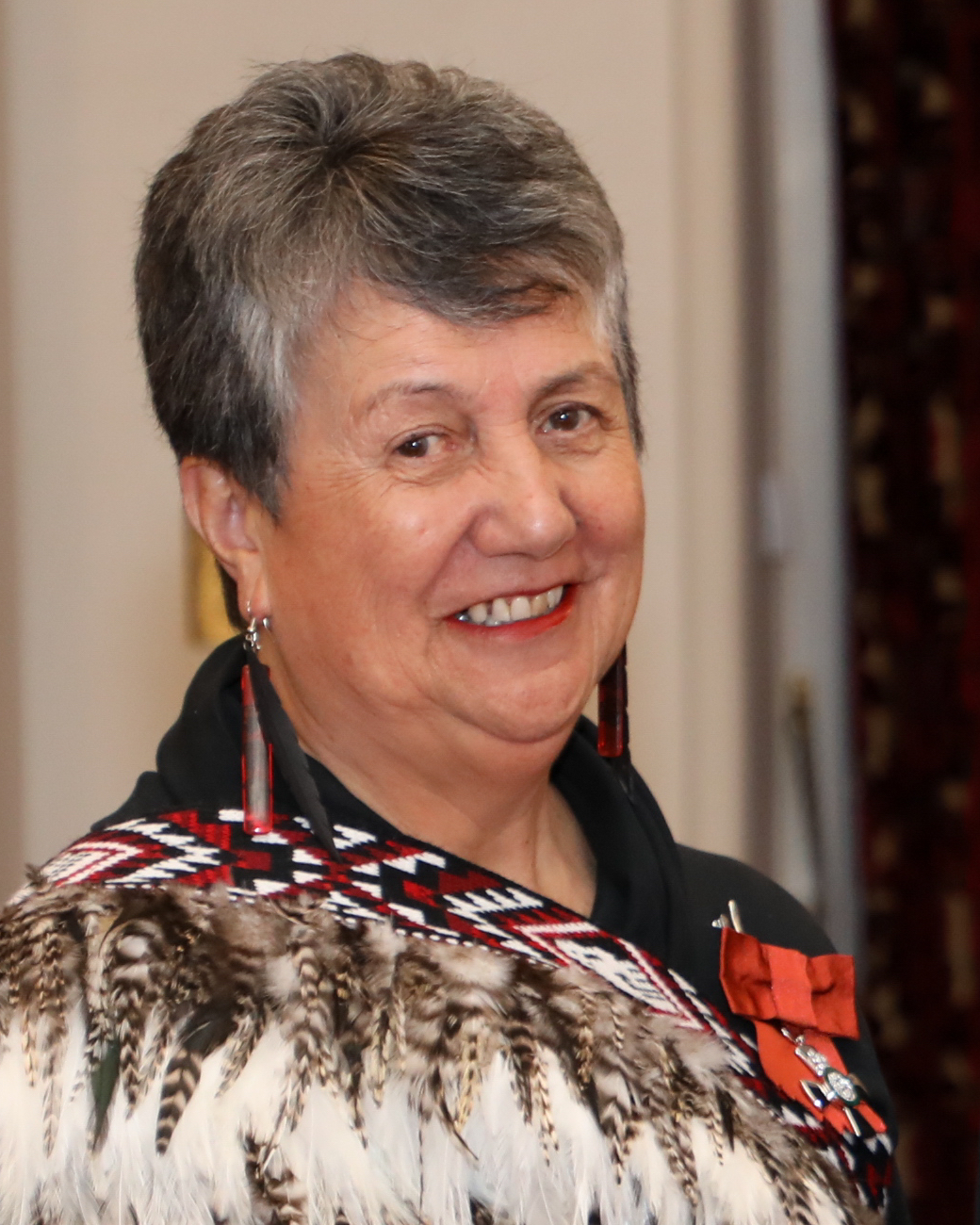
Marama Tuuta

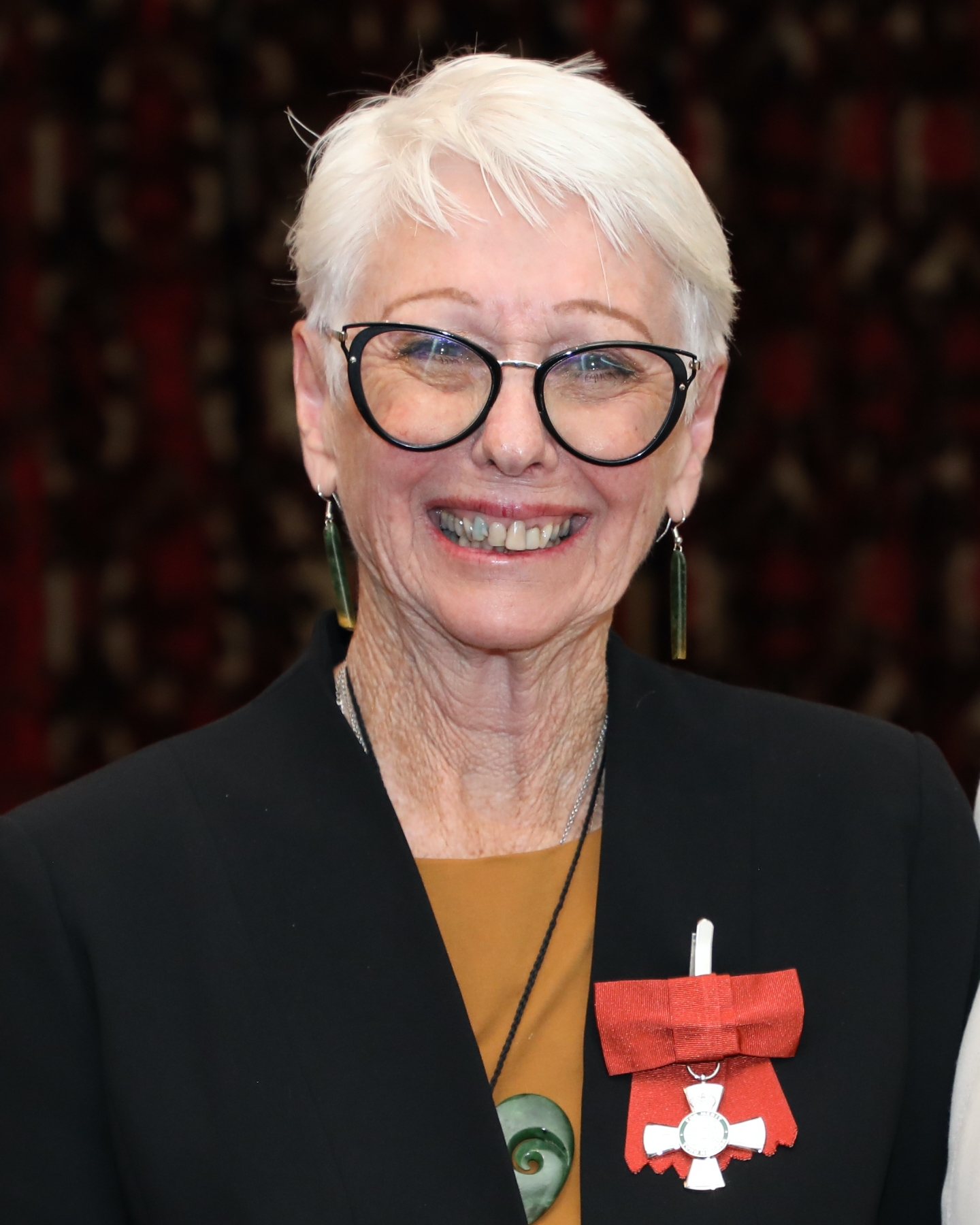
Wendy Ure

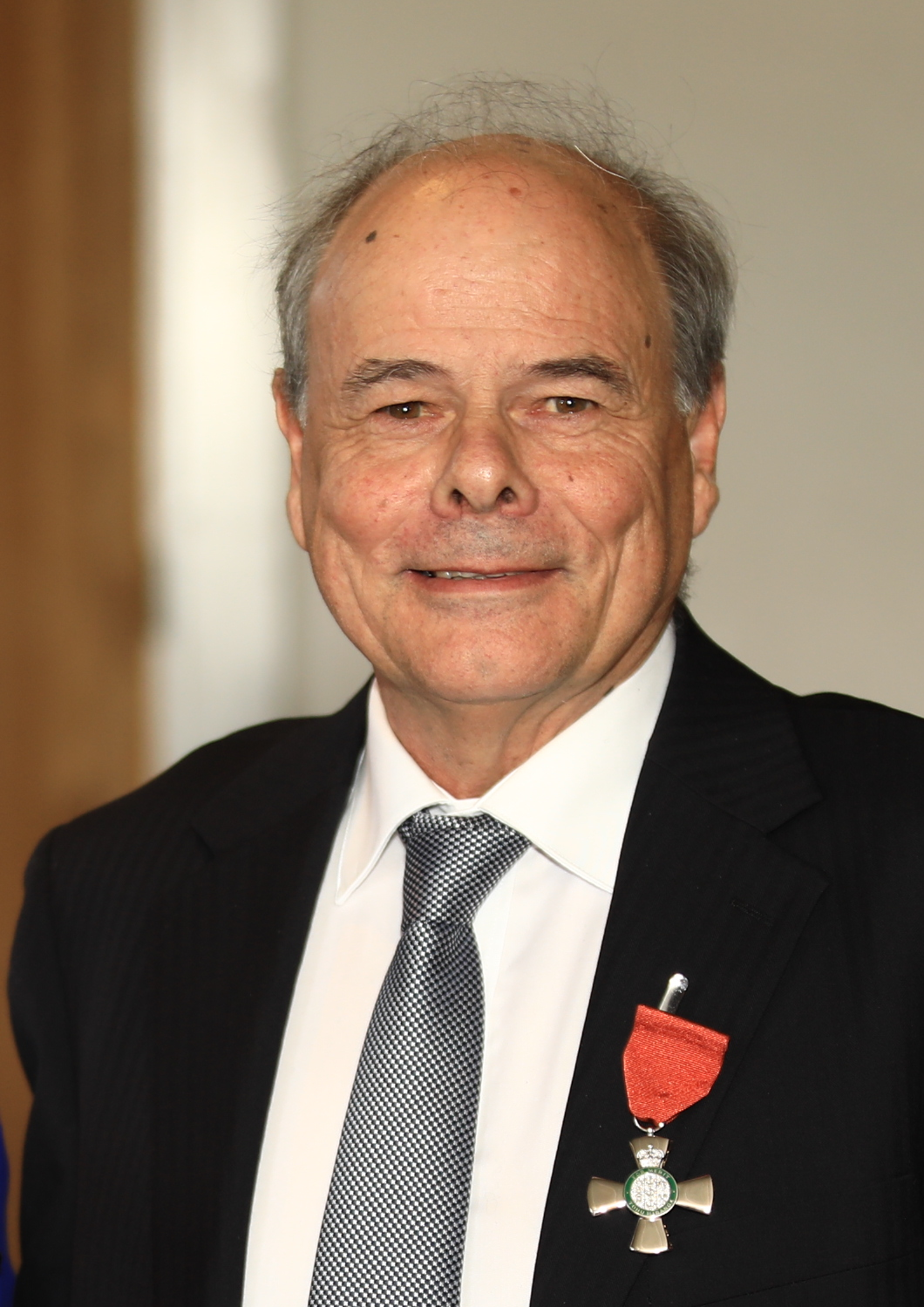
Gordon Wilson

== Companion of the Queen's Service Order (QSO) ==
- Gary John Dickson – of Wānaka. For services to search and rescue.
- Dr John Morgan Williams – of Richmond. For services to the state and the environment.
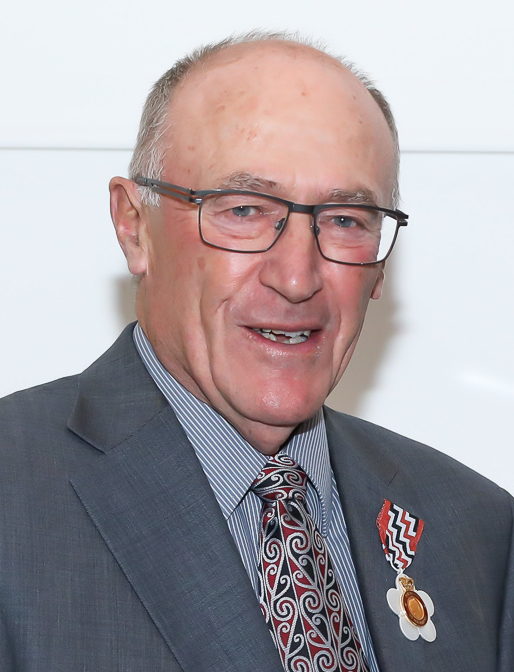
Morgan Williams

== Queen's Service Medal (QSM) ==
- Kataraina Kathy Allen – of Kaiti. For services to the community.
- Peter Leicester Ayson OStJ – of Otautau. For services to the community.
- Jaylene Viki Ball – of Manurewa. For services to Māori and the community.
- Rodney Elliott Brown – of Kerikeri. For services to conservation.
- Kathleen Anne Burford – of Westmorland, Christchurch. For services to migrant and refugee women and crafts.
- Stephen Michael Bush – of Richmond, Christchurch. For services to environmental rejuvenation.
- Diane Elizabeth Cleverley – of Timaru. For services to the community and music.
- Norman Rodney Crawshaw – of Westport. For services to the community and sport.
- Barbara Alison Elizabeth Cuthbert – of Devonport. For services to cycling and transport advocacy.
- Reverend Ngaire Glenys Davis – of Kawakawa. For services to the community.
- Panapa Stewart Davis – of Kawakawa. For services to the community.
- David Malcolm Denton – of Yaldhurst, Christchurch. For services to outdoor recreation and youth.
- Mairi Patricia Dickson JP – of Waikaia. For services to the community.
- Barbara Joan Dixon – of Māngere Bridge. For services to the community.
- Reverend Leslie Norman Dixon – of Māngere Bridge. For services to the community.
- Patricia Anne Flutey JP – of Whanganui. For services to Fire and Emergency New Zealand and the community.
- Shirley Frew – of Matamata. For services to textile crafts and the community.
- Dr Alison Heather Gaston – of North East Valley. For services to health and health education.
- Roger Francis Gilbert – of Leeston. For services to sport and historical research.
- Kenneth Alan Hamilton – of Alexandra. For services to athletics and youth.
- Sister Sally Catherine Hannan – of Island Bay. For services to the community.
- Allan John Hedley – of Nūhaka. For services to the community.
- Veranoa Angelique Hetet – of Waterloo. For services to Māori art.
- Lehi Hohaia – of Koutu. For services to the New Zealand Police and Māori.
- Suzanne Jane Hori Te Pa – of Levin. For services to the Pacific community and youth.
- Andrew John – of Picton. For services to conservation and education.
- David Stuart Jones – of Kirwee. For services to Fire and Emergency New Zealand.
- Rex Graham Kirk – of Christchurch. For services to the community and sport. (Note: Deceased. Her Majesty's approval of this award took effect on 22 October 2019, prior to the date of decease.)
- Carrell Mary Knight – of Levin. For services to lawn bowls.
- Reverend Evan Hope Lagaluga – of Favona. For services to the Niuean community.
- Petrus Wilhemus Martens – of Cambridge. For services to football.
- Beryl Joy Maultby – of Dunedin. For services to the community.
- Philippa Elizabeth McCann – of Queenstown. For services to the Blind Foundation.
- Lisa Claire McLaren – of Masterton. For services to climate change advocacy.
- James Peter Muir – of Tauranga. For services to the community.
- Kolovula Murphy – of Brooklyn. For services to Tongan and Pacific communities.
- Robert William Norling – of Ohakune. For services to railway heritage and the community.
- Terence Patrick O'Neill – of Oamaru. For services to sports journalism.
- Turangapito Parata – of Hāwera. For services to Māori, health and youth.
- Lui Ponifasio – of Manurewa. For services to the Pacific community.
- Mereane Ponifasio – of Manurewa. For services to the Pacific community.
- Hellen Puhipuhi – of Gonville. For services to the Pacific community and education.
- Murray Thomas Purvis – of Timaru. For services to the community and tennis.
- John Taylor Reed – of Arrowtown. For services to the community.
- Bruce Douglas Russell JP – of Christchurch. For services to the community.
- Cushla Alison Scrivens – of Hokowhitu. For services to historical research and heritage preservation.
- Harjit Singh – of Flat Bush. For services to the Indian community and seniors.
- Jean McLean Stanley – of Tūrangi. For services to conservation.
- Rosemary Margaret Stott – of Riccarton. For services to music.
- Barbara Florence Stuart – of Nelson. For services to conservation.
- Teremoana Tauira – of Takapuwahia. For services to the Pacific community.
- John Scott Taylor – of Wānaka. For services to the community.
- Barbara Mary Thompson – of Whitby. For services to the community and women.
- Leonie Mavis Tisch – of Matamata. For services to health and the community.
- Gillian Ruth Vaughan – of Red Hill. For services to wildlife conservation.
- Terence Archibald Wade – of Te Atatū South. For services to scouting, education and the community.
- Robyn Coralie Watchorn JP – of Whakatāne. For services to the community and art.

Honorary

- Reverend Kalolo Fihaki – of Papatoetoe. For services to the Tongan community.
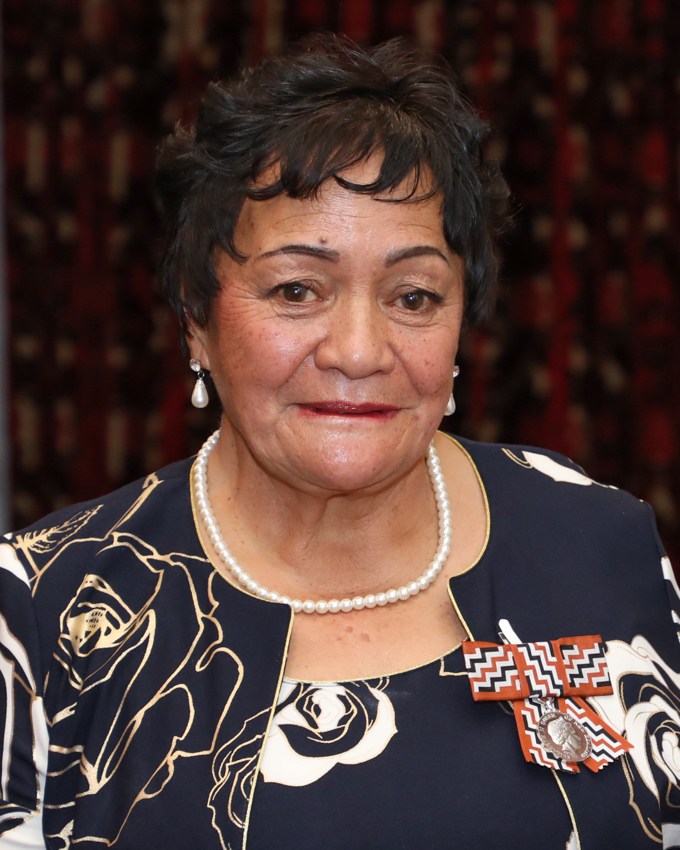
Kathy Allen

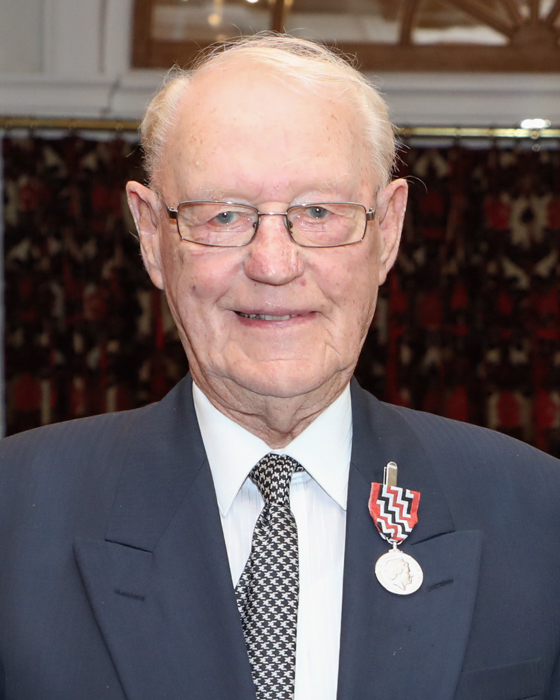
Peter Ayson

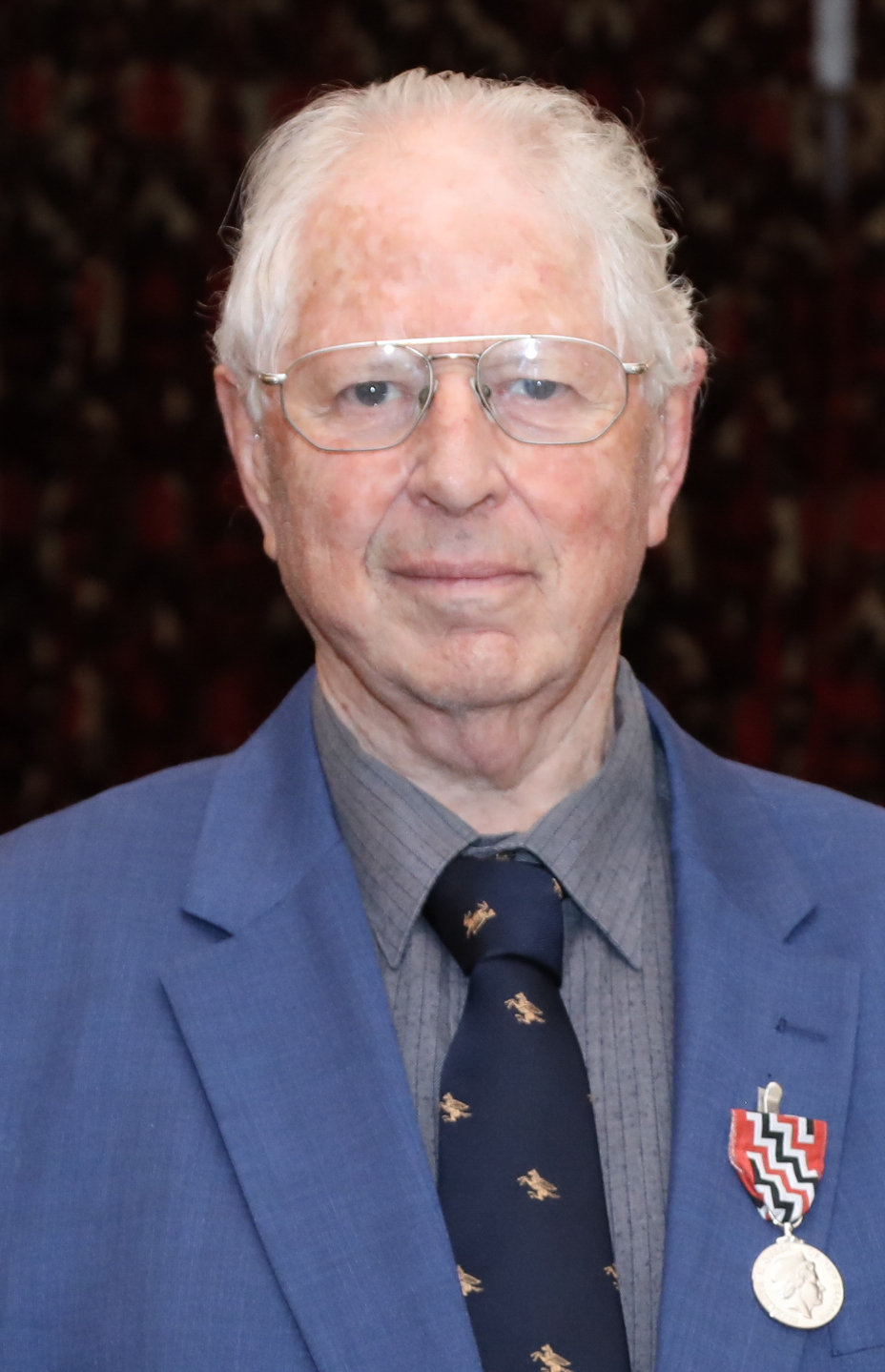
Norman Crawshaw

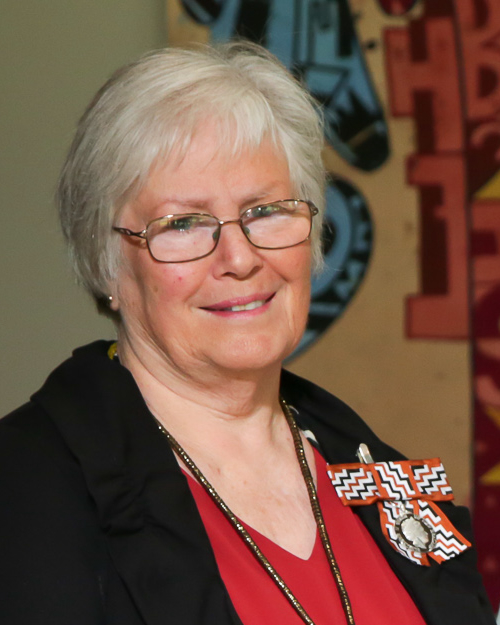
Glenys Davis

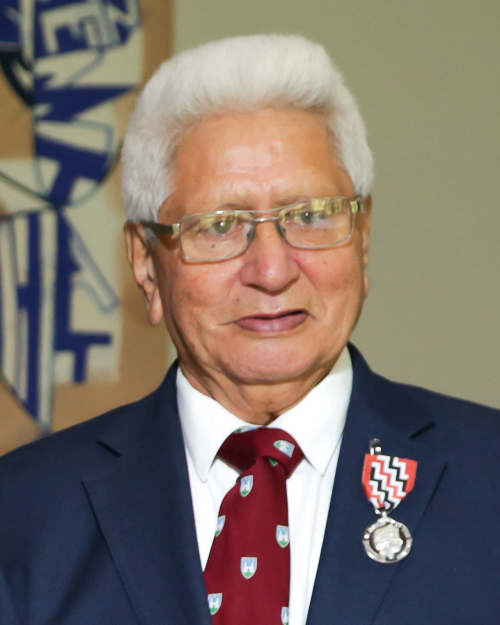
Pat Davis

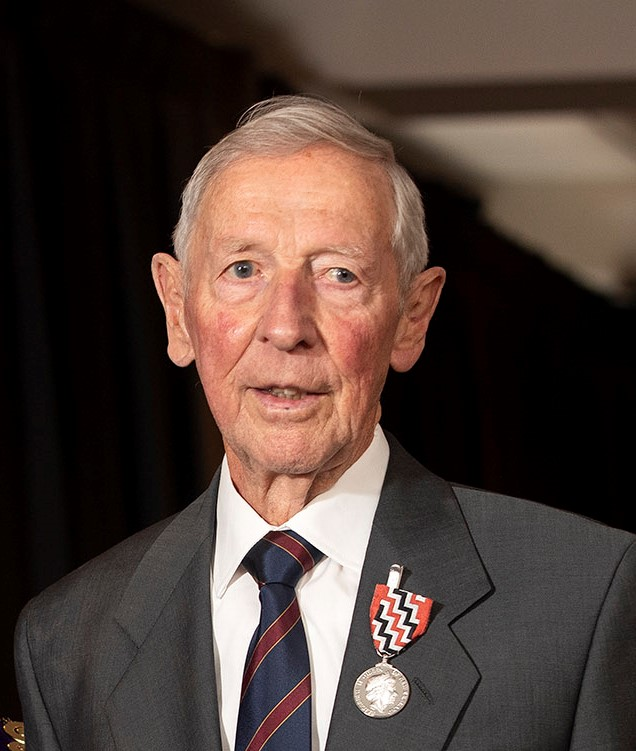
David Denton

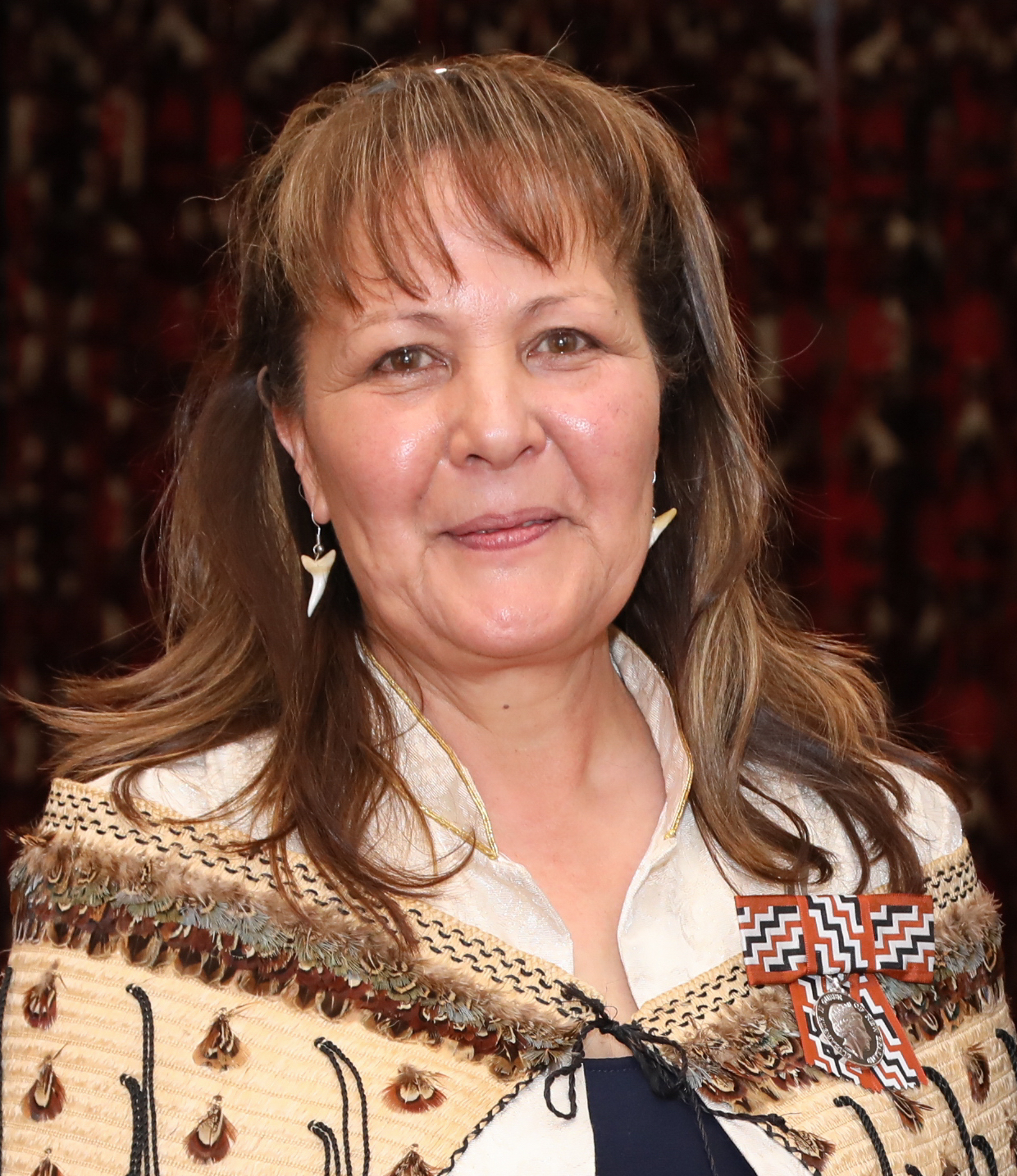
Veranoa Hetet

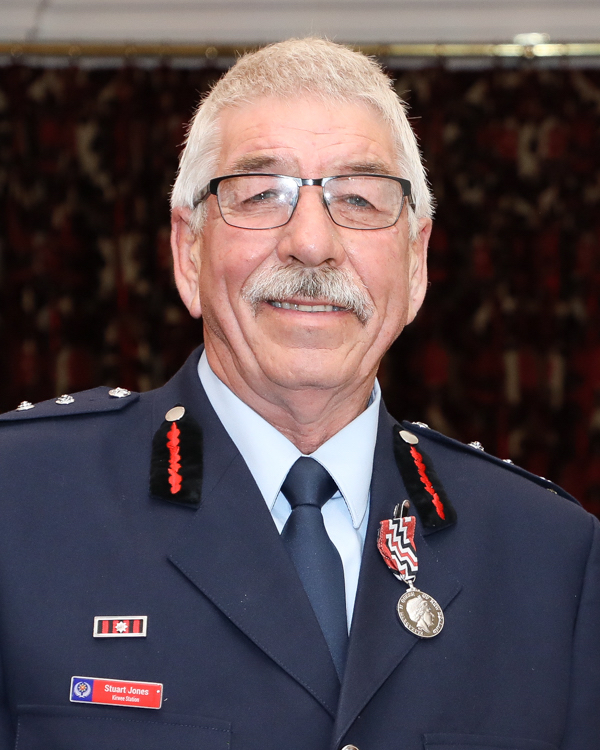
Stuart Jones

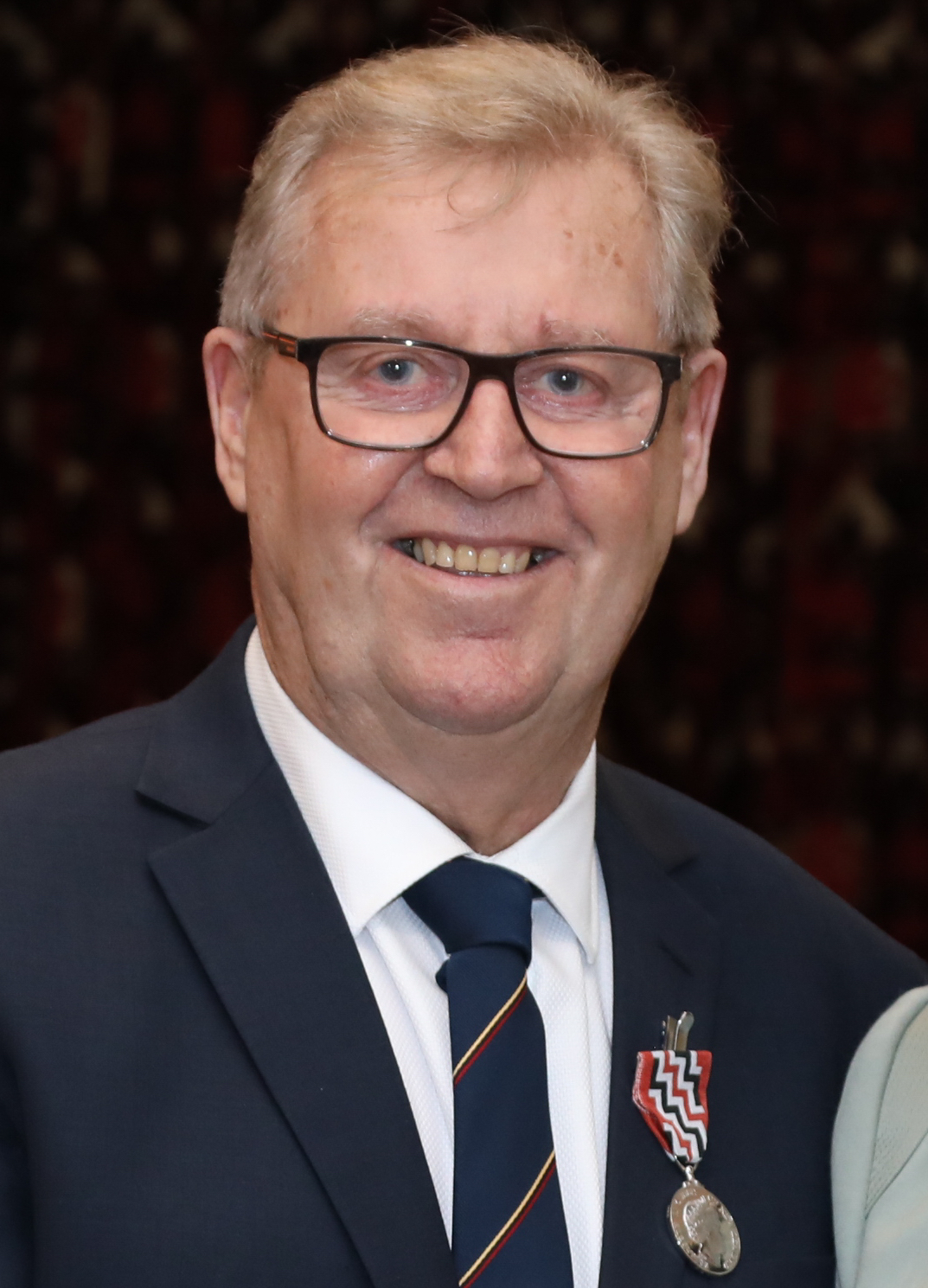
Peter Martens

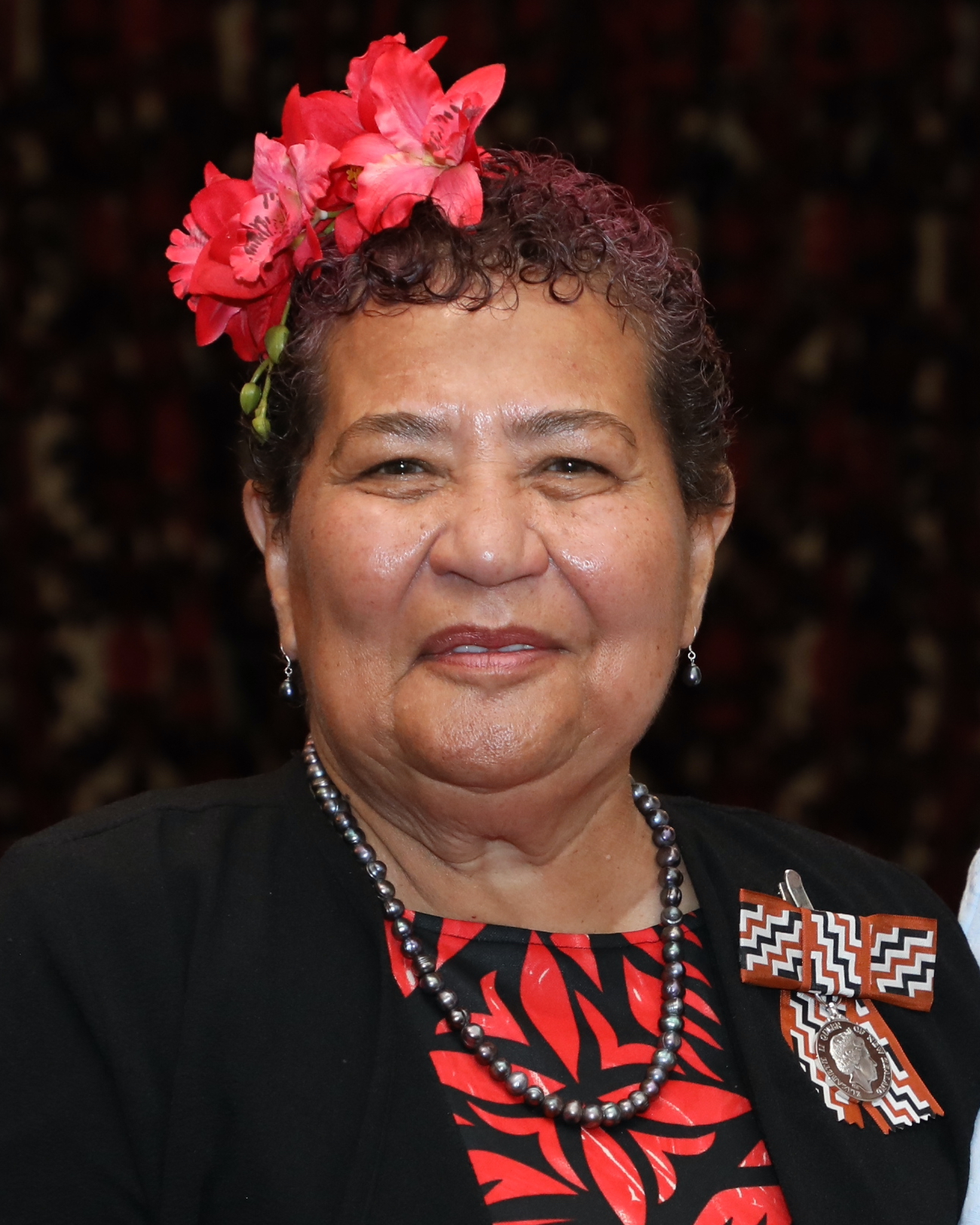
Hellen Puhipuhi

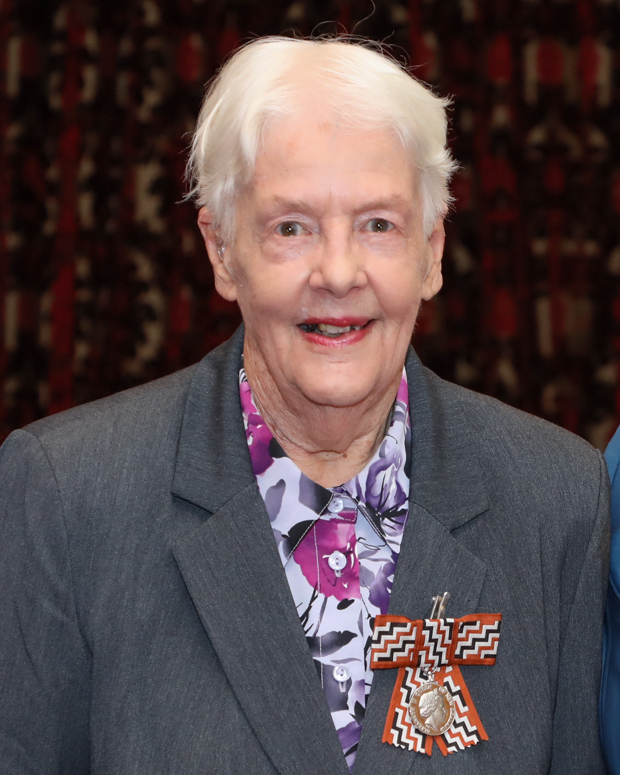
Jean Stanley

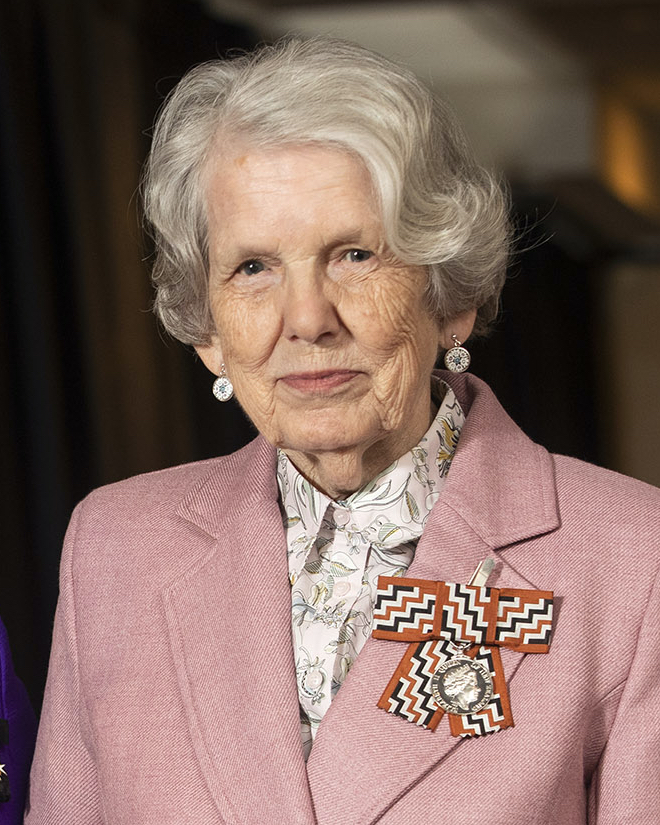
Rosemary Stott

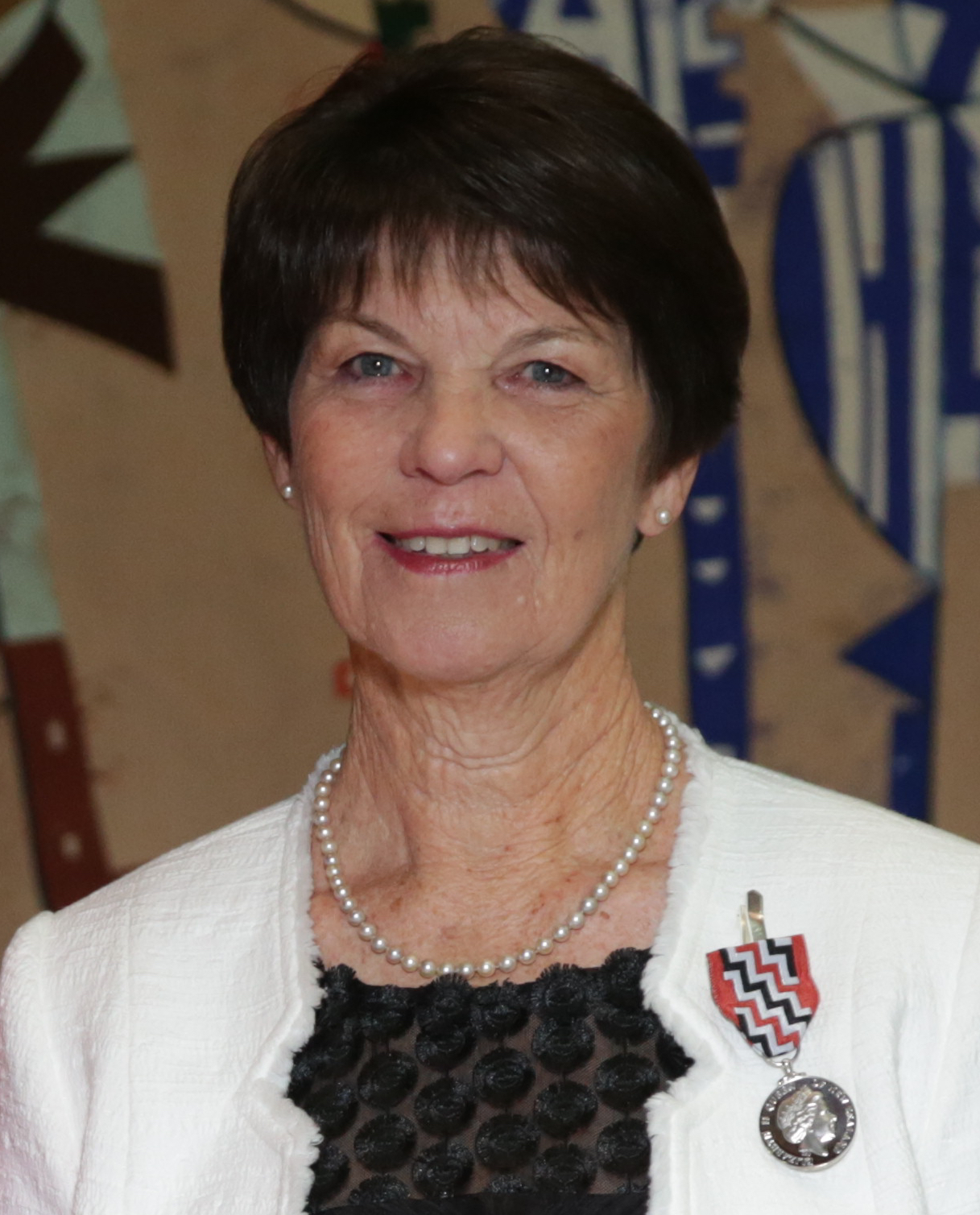
Leonie Tisch

== New Zealand Distinguished Service Decoration (DSD) ==
- Group Captain Michael James Cannon NZBM – of Napier. For services to the New Zealand Defence Force.
