= Southwell School =

Location
- 200 Peachgrove Road, Hamilton, New Zealand; 37.7741°S 175.2981°E

Information
- Type: Private Co-ed Full Primary (Year 1-8) with Boarding Facilities
- Motto: Per Aspera Ad Astrum (Through Adversity to the Stars)
- Denomination: Anglican
- Established: 1911
- Ministry of Education Institution no.: 4141
- Headmaster: Keryn Bindon
- Enrolment: 646 (July 2026)
- Socio-economic decile: 10
- Website: www.southwell.school.nz

Southwell School is an independent co-educational Anglican boarding and day school set in 32 acres of park-like grounds in central Hamilton, New Zealand. Southwell offers education to children aged 5 to 13 years. A number of international students attend the school.

== History ==
In November 1911, Cecil Ernest Ferris started Southwell School with one boy, Robert Oliver, and later Vernon Wilkinson, at Allington Homestead (which is now the site of Melville High School.)

In 1912, three D'Oyly Snow brothers joined the school, which was then held in a small building beside St Peter's Hall. By 1913 the roll had grown to twelve and the school had moved to Hukanui Road. In 1917 Mr H G Sergel became Headmaster and the school moved to Opoia Road. In 1921 the School moved to its present site on Peachgrove Road. The Sergel Family owned the school until 1963, when they transferred it to an independent Educational Trust, to be administered by a Trust Board.

== Notable alumni ==
- Daniel Gillies - actor
- Rt. Hon Sir Doug Graham - former Cabinet Minister
- Lance Hohaia - New Zealand and Warriors rugby league player
- Tūheitia Paki - Māori King between 2006 and 2024
- Rt. Hon Simon Upton - former Cabinet Minister and Rhodes Scholar
- Quinn Tupaea - All Black
- Gary Schofield MNZM - Artist and Author

== Notable former staff ==
- Maurice Marshall, Headmaster, Olympic & Commonwealth Games athlete
