= Gary Schofield =

Gary Schofield may refer to:

- Garry Schofield (born 1965), English former rugby league footballer
- Gary Schofield (artist), New Zealand artist, writer, musician, television producer, president of Global Concern, Inc.
