= Lexie Matheson =

LGBT activist, entertainer and educator

Lexie Matheson ONZM
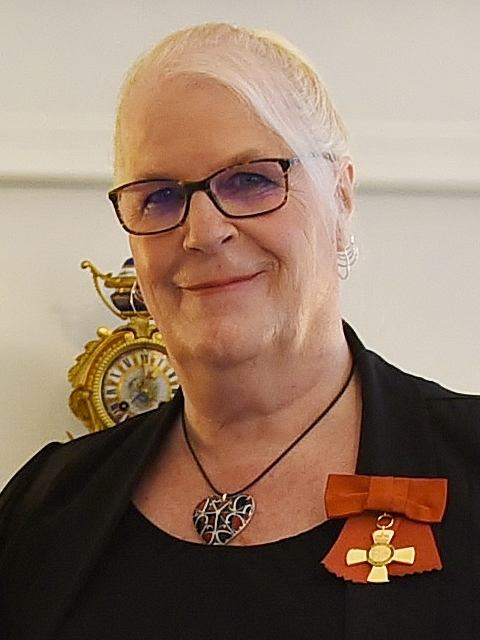
- Matheson in 2016
- Born: 1944 or 1945 (age 80–81)
- Occupations: Activist, entertainer, educator

Alexandra Mary Raine Matheson ONZM (born 1945) is a New Zealand transgender activist, entertainer, and educator.

== Early life ==
Lexie was born in Christchurch to Anne Charlotte Euphemia (nee Rule) and John Walker Matheson. She had two step-siblings, Elaine and Clyde. She was educated at Linwood North School, Linwood Intermediate, and Linwood High School. On leaving school at the end of her 6th form (Year 12) she enrolled at Christchurch Teacher's Training College and the University of Canterbury, graduating in 1965. As a young person she was talented at sport regularly representing Canterbury in both rugby and cricket in under age grades.

== Career ==
Matheson started her career in the 1960s as a teacher, and then became a principal. She was the business manager of the Maidment Theatre at the University of Auckland. Whilst at Maidment Theatre, she completed a Master of Creative and Performing Arts in arts management with honours. In 2006, she started as senior lecturer in event management at Auckland University of Technology.

As of 2018 Matheson was working on her doctoral thesis, examining the history of karate in New Zealand.

As an entertainer, she has been involved in over 400 theatrical productions. Matheson was part of the Theatre Corporate, directed by Raymond Hawthorne, from 1976 to 1979. Following these, she founded two theatre companies, one based at the Four Seasons Theatre in Whanganui, and then the Troupers Live Theatrix in Christchurch, with the latter running until 1998. Between 1998 and 2026 Matheson wrote over 400 theatre reviews.

Having competed in NZ Theatre Federation Short Play Festivals since 1993 and being runner up in the national final three times with 'Secundus', Zachustra', and 'Ancestral Fling', all by Bruce Goodman, she won the prestigious title in 1996 with Goodman's 'The Chimney'.

== Activism and community work ==
Matheson has had a number of governance roles within the New Zealand LGBT community. She chaired the Hero Inc Board that organised the 2002 Hero Inc Festival and March, and was a founding member of its successor, the Auckland Pride Festival serving as a board member and co-chair from 2013 to 2018. She has also been involved with Agender New Zealand Auckland and was a trustee for Transadvocates.

Other areas of activism that Matheson has been involved in include campaigning to add gender identity as a protected identity under the Human Rights Act 1993, and the treatment of transgender people who are incarcerated.

Matheson has advocated for the mental health needs of older LGBT people in New Zealand. In response to a government policy of mental health needs for younger LGBT people, she said: "We LGBTQI oldies experience all the challenges that other older people face in any ageing community, but we have our own unique challenges as well".

In sport, Matheson has campaigned for transgender athletes to be able to compete in all levels of competitive sport. Lexie has worn the fern in two sports herself, karate and archery, and is the first transgender woman to compete in the World Goju Ryu Karate Federation Championships in Bucharest, Romania in 2017, where she won bronze, and again in 2022 in Foligno, Italy where she won silver. She is a fourth dan black belt in Okinawan Goju Ryu Karate. Lexie has been a member of the World Archery Gender Equity and Inclusion Committee since 2021, is a past chair of Archery New Zealand and has managed a number of New Zealand archery teams internationally.

== Personal life ==
Matheson was assigned male at birth and realised she was transgender when she was eight years old. She transitioned in 1998, aged 53. She has been married twice, with her first marriage ending in divorce. She and her second wife have a son together.

== Honours and awards ==
In the 2016 Queen's Birthday Honours, Matheson was appointed an Officer of the New Zealand Order of Merit, for services to performing arts, education and LGBTIQ rights. Matheson won the New Zealander of the Year 'Local Hero' award in 2016 and has been nominated for the Senior New Zealander of the Year Award in 2019, 2020, 2021 and 2023 being runner up in 2020.
