= Matiu Te Rei =

Māori leader (born 1948)

Sir Matiu Te Rei KNZM
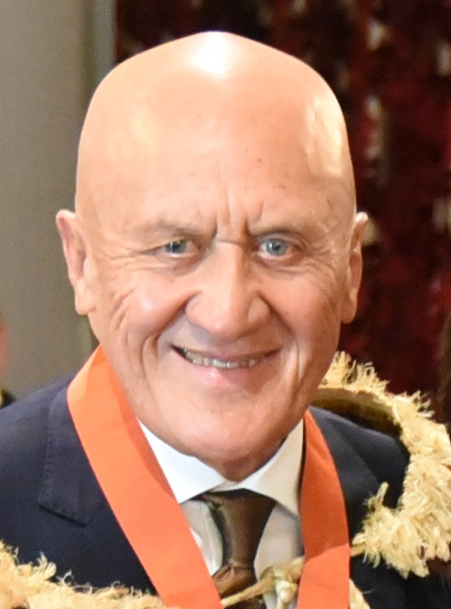
- Te Rei in 2016
- Born: Matiu Nohorua Te Rei; 1948 (age 77–78)

Sir Matiu Nohorua Te Rei KNZM (born 1948) is a New Zealand Māori leader from Ngāti Toa Rangatira. In the 2016 Queen's Birthday Honours, he was appointed a Knight Companion of the New Zealand Order of Merit, for services to Māori.
