= Charlie Crofts (Māori leader) =

New Zealand Māori leader (1943–2024)

Charlie Crofts ONZM
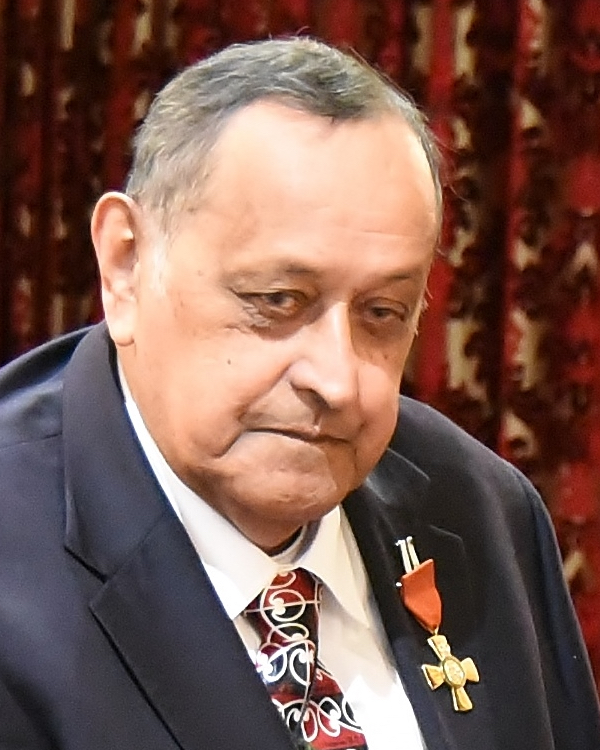
- Crofts in 2017
- Born: Charles Stuart Te Manemoeroa Crofts; December 1943; Tuahiwi, New Zealand
- Died: 26 February 2024 (aged 80)
- Other names: Uncle Charlie
- Occupation: Māori leader
- Spouse: Meri Te Aroha Wereta (m. 1962)
- Children: 2

Charles Stuart Te Manemoeroa Crofts ONZM (December 1943 – 26 February 2024) was a New Zealand Māori leader of the Ngāi Tahu iwi.

== Career ==
Charlie Crofts was born in December 1943 in Tuahiwi, as the youngest son of Edward and Metapere Ngawini Crofts (nee Barrett). He learned about the Ngāi Tahu Claim through his grandfather William Barrett. Crofts served for 20 years in the New Zealand army. He left the army in 1985 and worked as a taxi driver. It was during this time that he became involved with Koukourarata Rūnanga, to support the whānau living at Port Levy. Crofts was elected the chairperson of Koukourarata Rūnanga, which involved him with the Ngaitahu Māori Trust Board. In 1990, he was appointed the Koukourarata Representative for Te Rūnanganui o Tahu, and was promoted to kaiwhakahaere soon afterwards. When Te Rūnanga o Ngāi Tahu was established in 1996, Crofts was elected as its first kaiwhakahaere. Following Ngāi Tahu, Crofts was appointed to the New Zealand Conservation Authority. He was a member of the Canterbury Water Management Committee, Lyttelton Port Company, the director of the Canterbury Museum, and was a kaumātua for Christchurch City Council. He was appointed an Officer of the New Zealand Order of Merit (ONZM) for services to Māori in the 2016 Birthday Honours. He was nicknamed "Uncle Charlie".

== Personal life and death ==
Crofts married Meri Te Aroha Wereta in 1962, and they had two children. Crofts died on 26 February 2024, at the age of 80.
