= Karen Sewell =

New Zealand educator and public servant

Dame Karen Sewell DNZM QSO
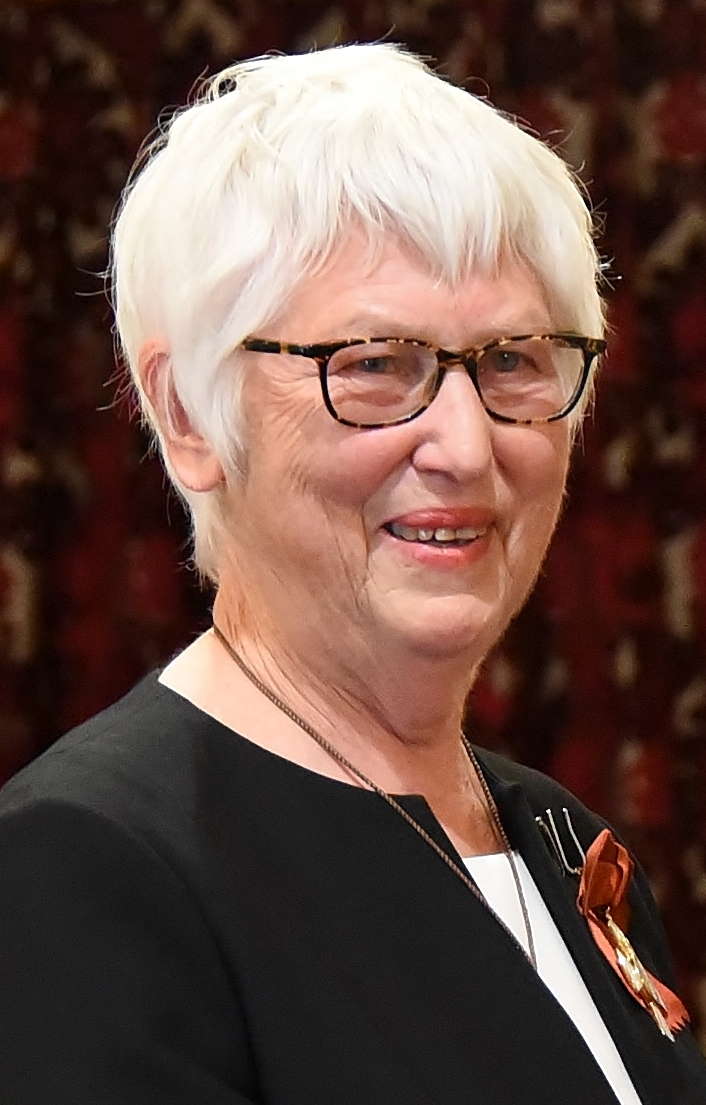
- Sewell in 2016
- Born: 1944 or 1945 (age 80–81)

Dame Karen Margaret Sewell DNZM QSO (born 1944 or 1945) is a New Zealand educator and public servant.

== Career ==
=== Educator ===
Sewell was born in Whanganui and attended Whanganui Girls College, where she was head girl and a classmate of future Māori Party leader Dame Tariana Turia. She studied at Victoria University of Wellington and trained as a teacher at Auckland Secondary Teachers’ College.

She began her teaching career in about 1966 and worked in Wellington, England, and Auckland. Latterly, she was principal of Green Bay High School. During her teaching career, she was president of the Auckland Secondary Schools Principals' Association, and chairwoman of the New Zealand Post Primary Teachers' Association Principals' Council.

=== Senior public servant ===
Sewell commenced as chief executive of the Education Review Office in 1996. In 2005, she was acting chief executive of the New Zealand Qualifications Authority and held that position until May 2006. From 2006 to 2011, when she retired, she was Secretary for Education and chief executive of the Ministry of Education.

In 2012, Sewell was appointed chair of the board of Te Aho o Te Kura Pounamu (formerly the Correspondence School); her term in that role ended in 2019. She was an advisor to the Minister of Education, Hekia Parata, on schooling in Christchurch following the 2011 Christchurch earthquakes.

== Honours ==
In the 2012 New Year Honours, she was appointed a Companion of the Queen's Service Order, for services to the State, and in the 2016 Queen's Birthday Honours, she was appointed a Dame Companion of the New Zealand Order of Merit, for services to education.

== Private Life ==
Karen Sewell now lives on Waiheke Island.
