= Pareaute Nathan =

New Zealand teacher and weaver

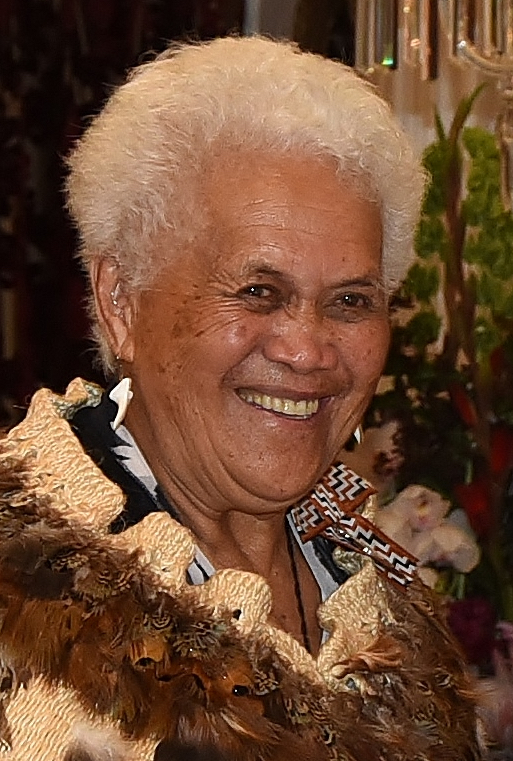
Nathan in 2016

Pareaute Polly Nathan QSM is a New Zealand Māori educator and weaver. In the 2016 Queen's Birthday Honours, she was awarded the Queen's Service Medal, for services to Māori and education.

== Biography ==
Nathan completed a teaching diploma at the University of Waikato in Hamilton, in 1994. She spent much of her working life as a Māori language teacher in the Far North of the North Island of New Zealand. She taught at Ahipara School and Kaitaia College, and was Head of Māori at Kaitaia College from 1985 until her retirement in 2003. She also visited and supported Māori language teaching in other schools in the region as a member of Te Reo o Te Tai Tokerau, the secondary schools te reo Maori teachers' group. At Kaitaia College she hosted regional kapa haka and speech competitions, and established the annual Far North Schools Multi-cultural Festival in the 1980s.

Nathan began weaving in the 1960s, learning from 'Aunty' Florrie Berghan. After her retirement from teaching in 2003 she became more involved with weaving, holding monthly workshops at the Ahipara's Roma marae. In 2009 she established a weaving gallery, Te Whare Whiri Toi, to maintain the art of traditional weaving, and organised a national weavers' hui at Ahipara. In 2015 she received Creative New Zealand's Te Waka Toi Tohunga Raranga (King Ihaka) Award.

Nathan is a member of the Tainui and Te Rarawa tribes.
