= Mele Nemaia =

Community organiser of Niuean descent

Mele Nemaia MNZM
- Born: Niue
- Awards: Member of the New Zealand Order of Merit

Mele Fakatali Nemaia MNZM is a community organiser and educator of Niuean descent.

== Background ==
Nemaia was born in Niue and has several generations of Niuean ancestry. She currently lives in Auckland, New Zealand.

== Career ==
Nemaia is an active proponent of the Niuean language and culture. For over six years she has taught after-school Niuean language classes and supported the implementation of the 'Achieving Through Pasifika Language' programme in Auckland. Nemaia has also worked as a senior teacher at Favona Primary School in Auckland and co-authored several books for children in Niuean including Laga Fetoko He Matamaka and Ko e Tala Mai Niu Silani.

Nemaia has been chair of the Vagahau Niue Trust for over five years, an organisation that supports the teaching and use of the Niuean language.

As an advisor on Pasifika languages, Nemaia has been a member of the Ministry of Education’s Pacific Advisory Group and sat on the Pacific Advisory Group for the Auckland Museum. She has also been part of the New Zealand branch of the International Pacific Women’s Information Network. As a member of Pacific Women's Indigenous Networks (PacificWin), Nemaia has helped promoted women's rights in the Pacific, including as a lead facilitator at the PacificWin Women’s Indigenous Network International Conference in 2015.

== Honours and awards ==
In the 2016 Queen's Birthday Honours, Nemaia was appointed a Member of the New Zealand Order of Merit, for services to the Niuean community.
