= 2016 Birthday Honours (New Zealand) =

New Zealand Honours list

2016 Queen’s 90th Birthday Honours
- Previous: 2016 New Year Honours; Next: 2016 Special Honours
- Type: New Zealand royal honours: New Zealand Order of Merit; Queen's Service Order; Queen's Service Medal; Distinguished Service Decoration
- Date: 6 June 2016
- Country: New Zealand
- Total recipients: 177

The 2016 Queen's 90th Birthday Honours in New Zealand, celebrating the official birthday of Queen Elizabeth II, were appointments made by the Queen in her right as Queen of New Zealand, on the advice of the New Zealand government, to various orders and honours to reward and highlight good works by New Zealanders. They were announced on 6 June 2016.

The recipients of honours are listed here as they were styled before their new honour.

== New Zealand Order of Merit ==
=== Dame Companion (DNZM) ===
- The Honourable Ellen Dolour France – of Wellington. For services to the judiciary.
- Karen Margaret Sewell QSO – of Wellington. For services to education.
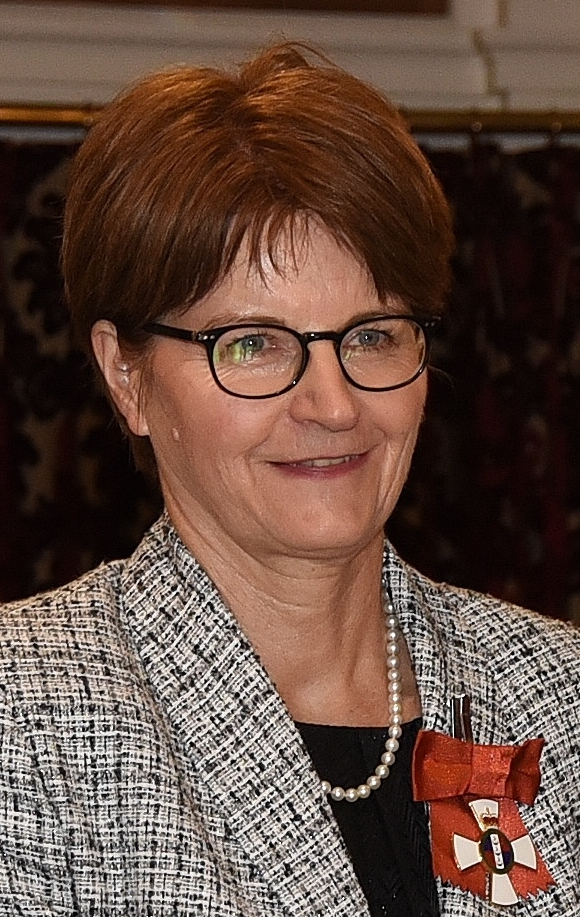
Dame Ellen France

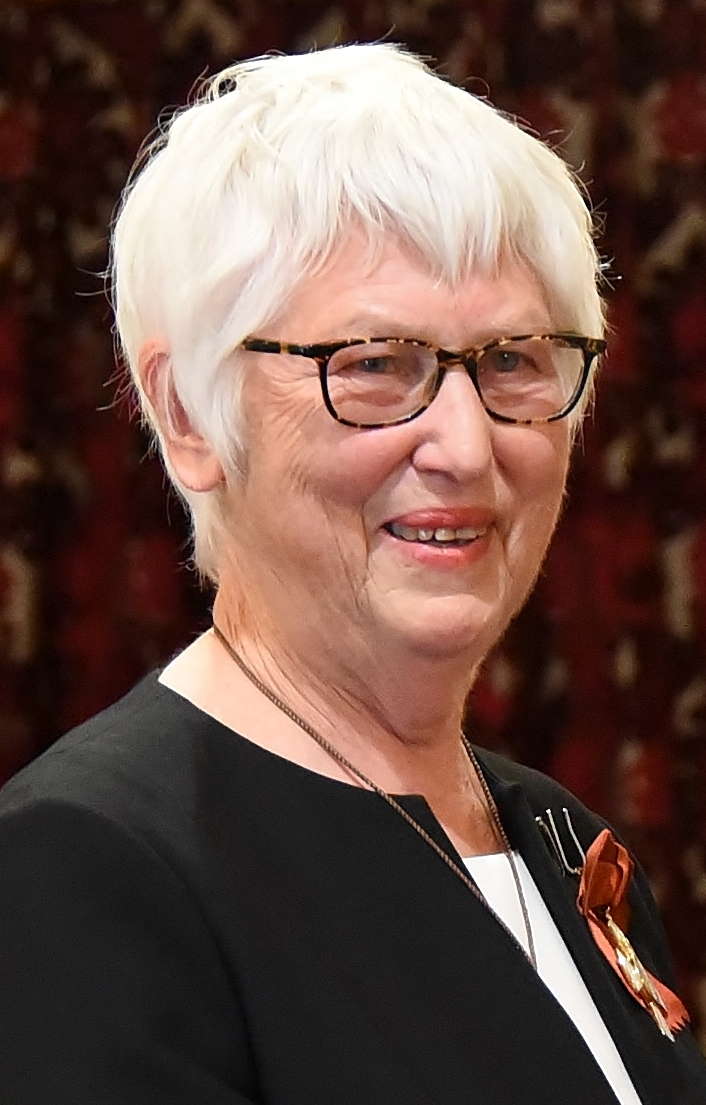
Dame Karen Sewell

=== Knight Companion (KNZM) ===
- Robert George Mappin Fenwick CNZM KStJ – of Auckland. For services to conservation and business.
- Michael Friedlander CNZM – of Auckland. For services to philanthropy.
- Christopher Robert Mace CNZM – of Auckland. For services to science and education.
- Matiu Nohorua Te Rei – of Wellington. For services to Māori.
- The Honourable Ronald Leslie Young – of Greytown. For services to the judiciary.
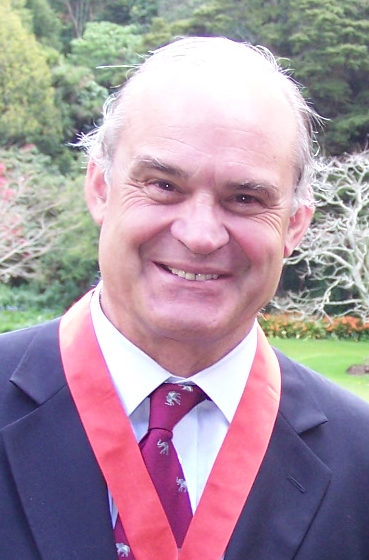
Sir Rob Fenwick

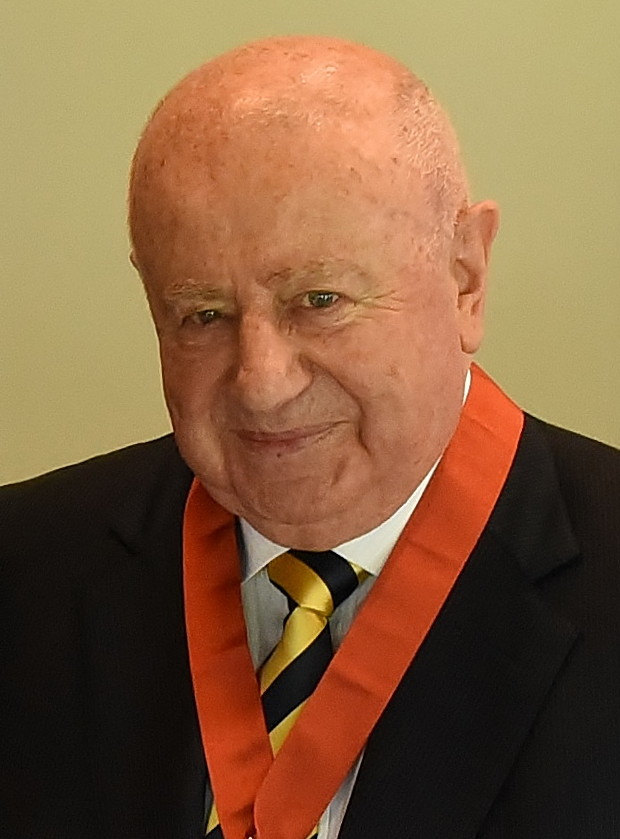
Sir Michael Friedlander

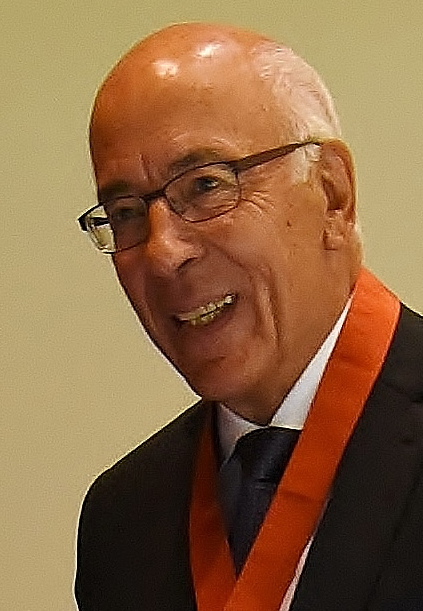
Sir Chris Mace

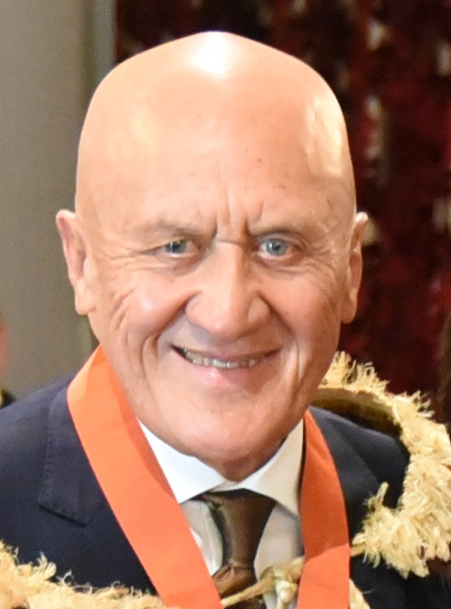
Sir Matiu Te Rei

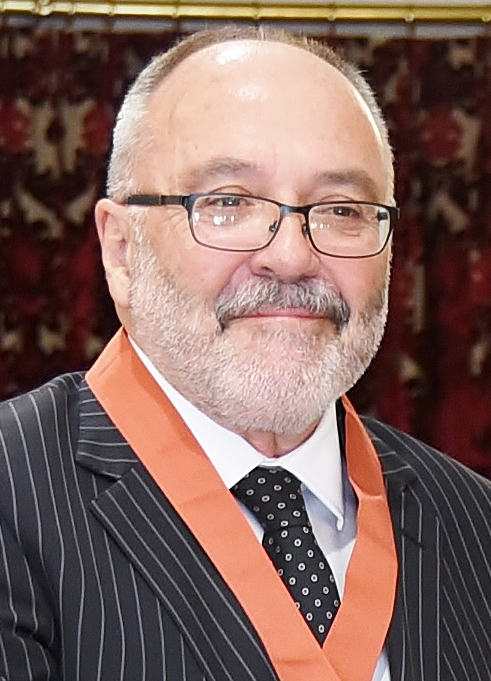
Sir Ron Young

=== Companion (CNZM) ===
- Professor John Renata Broughton ED – of Dunedin. For services to Māori health, theatre and the community.
- Janice Amelia Dawson – of Auckland. For services to governance.
- George Gerald Farrant – of Auckland. For services to heritage preservation.
- Myrlene Dawn Jones OBE JP – of Auckland. For services to netball and education.
- Dr Dianne Christine McCarthy ONZM – of Blenheim. For services to science, business and women.
- Dr Thomas Ernest Miller – of Auckland. For services to medical research.
- Jennifer Mary Prince – of Wellington. For services to children and children's health.
- Professor William Te Rangiua Temara – of Hamilton. For services to Māori and education.
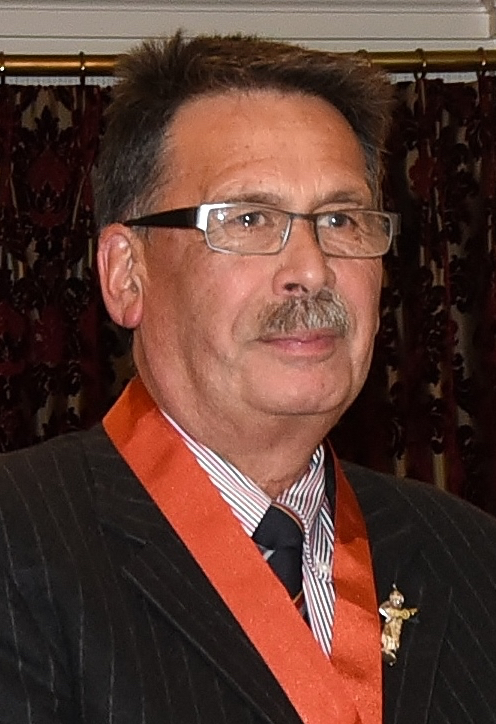
John Broughton

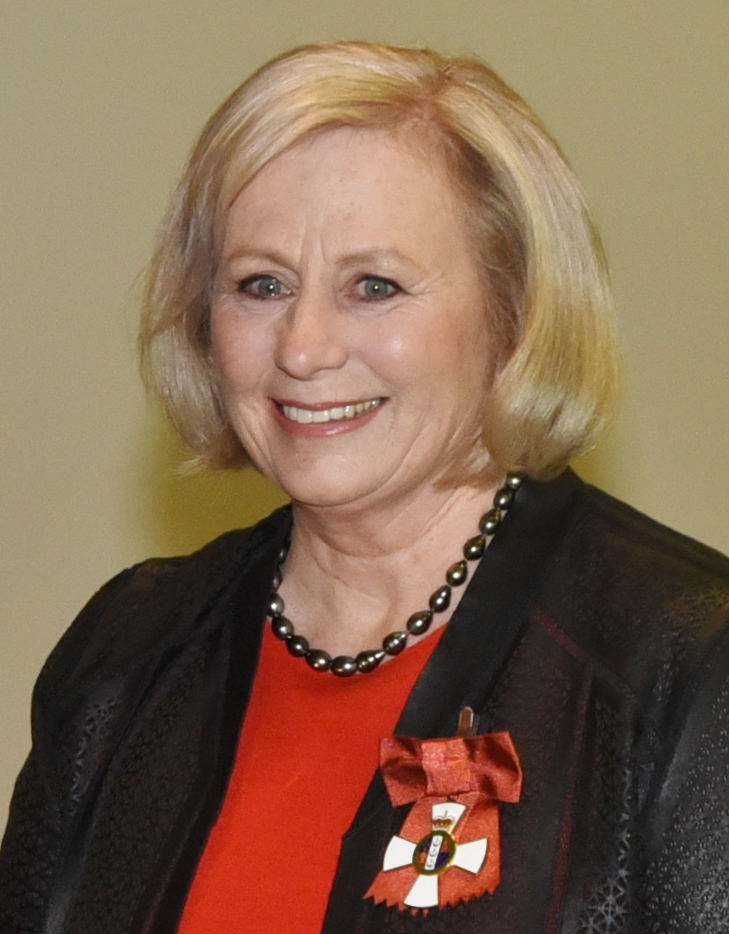
Jan Dawson

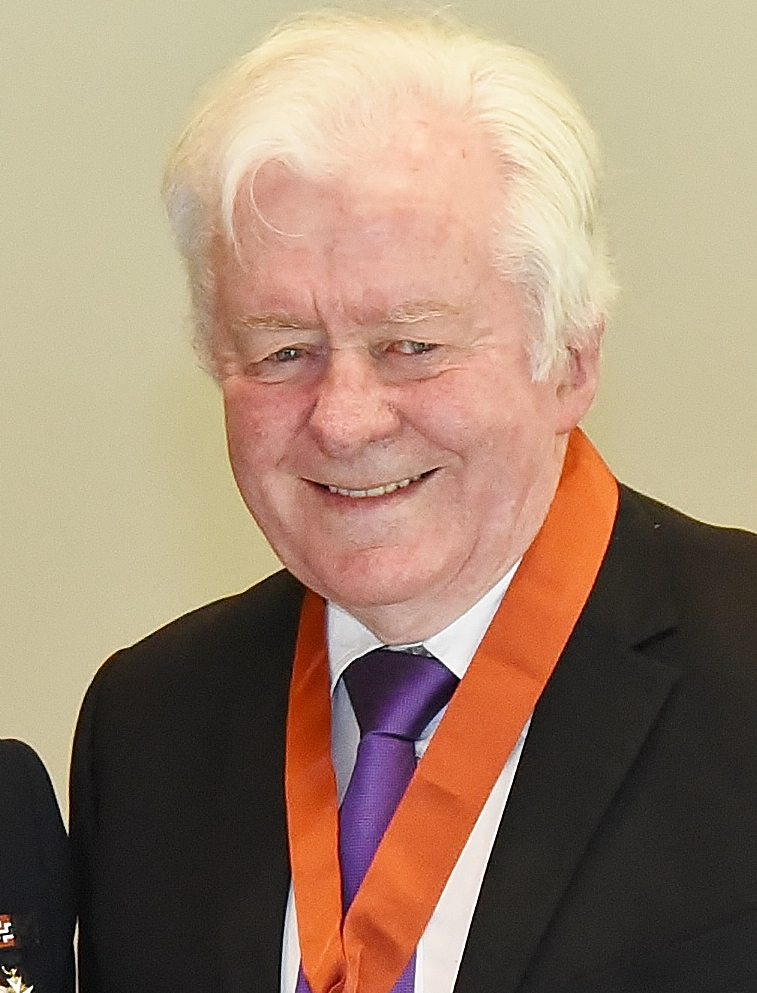
George Farrant

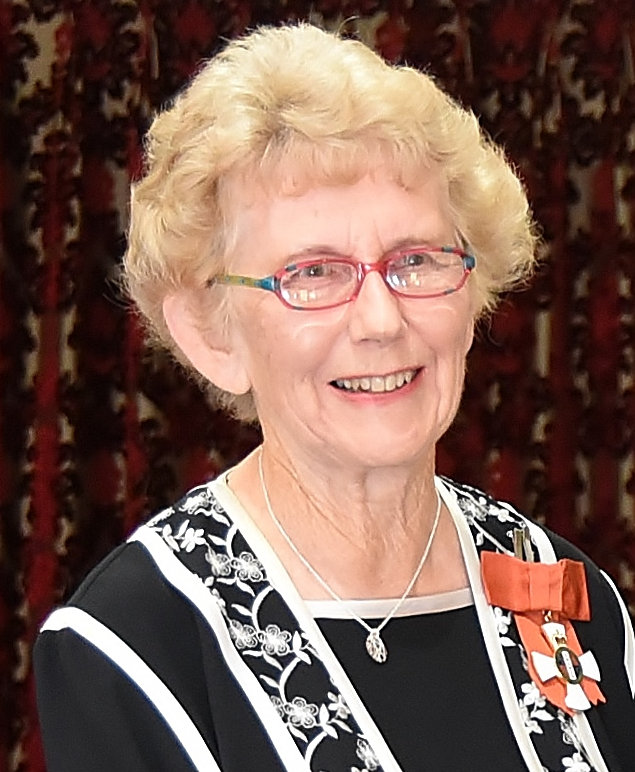
Dawn Jones

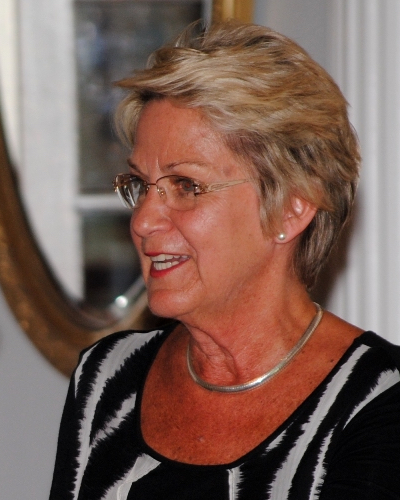
Di McCarthy

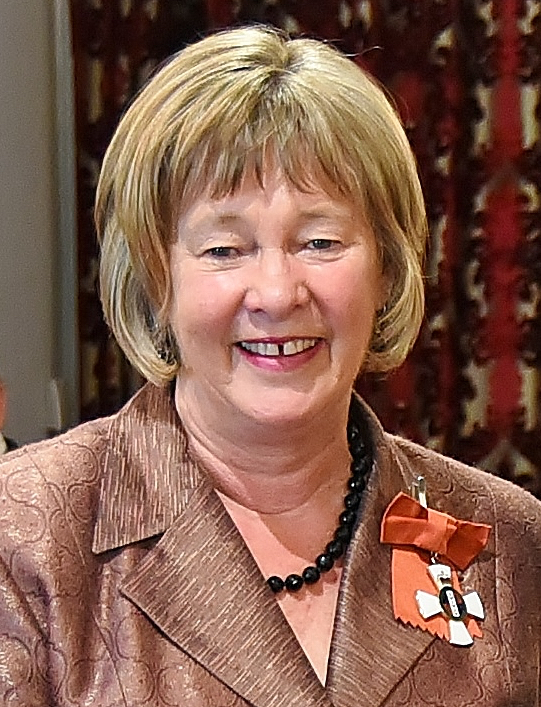
Jenny Prince

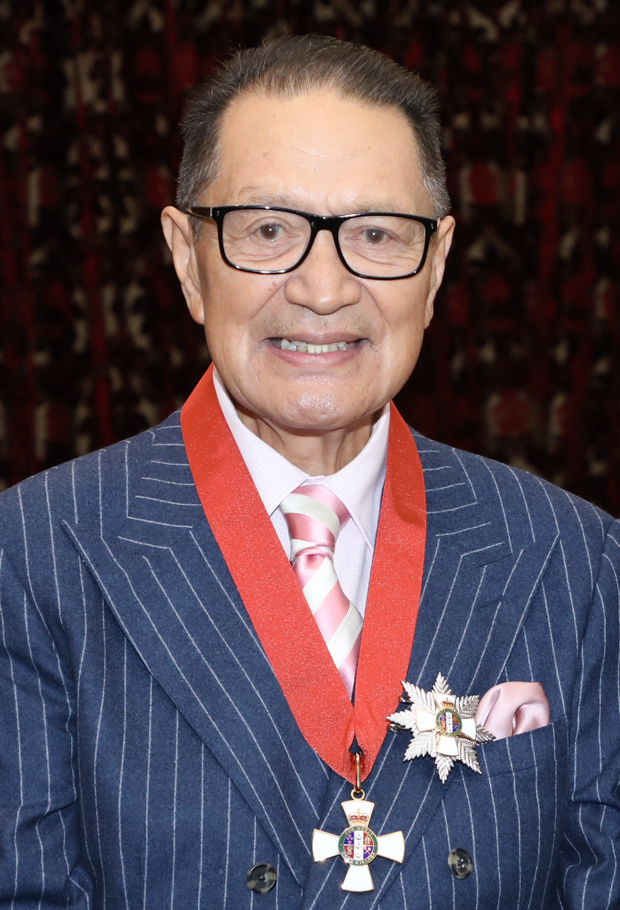
Pou Temara

=== Officer (ONZM) ===
- Franceska Banga – of Auckland. For services to business and the community.
- Stewart Arthur Barnett – of Christchurch. For services to agriculture and business.
- Heather Irene Bell – of Auckland. For services to education.
- David Winston Aitken Bennett – of Whanganui. For services to business and the community.
- Maurice Cruikshank Clark – of Wellington. For services to heritage preservation and the construction industry.
- Elizabeth Mary Coutts – of Auckland. For services to governance.
- Charles Stuart Temane Moeroa Crofts – of Christchurch. For services to Māori.
- Finola Dwyer – of London. For services to the film industry.
- Prudence Shirley Etcheverry – of Auckland. For services to people with leukaemia and blood cancer.
- Dr Trevor Paul FitzJohn – of Wellington. For services to radiology.
- Professor Wei Gao – of Auckland. For services to science and engineering.
- Mark Joseph Greenwood – of Te Puke. For services to biosecurity.
- Inspector Patrick James Handcock – of Palmerston North. For services to the New Zealand Police and the community.
- Danielle Pikihuia Harris – of Palmerston North. For services to Māori and health.
- Peter Frank Haythornthwaite – of Kaikohe. For services to design.
- Neil Ieremia – of Auckland. For services to dance.
- Christopher Morton Kelly – of Wellington. For services to agriculture.
- Dr Niall Patrick Kelly – of Auckland. For services to children's health.
- Dr Peter David Martin – of Wellington. For services to tobacco control.
- Alexandra Mary Raine Matheson – of Auckland. For services to performing arts, education and LGBTIQ rights.
- Lesley Jean Murdoch MBE – of Christchurch. For services to sport.
- Philip John O'Reilly – of Wellington. For services to business and governance.
- Emeritus Professor Bryan Ronald Parry – of Auckland. For services to colorectal surgery.
- William John Perham – of Carterton. For services to philanthropy and the community.
- Annette Presley – of Auckland. For services to business and women.
- Samuel Kevin Prime MBE – of Kawakawa. For services to conservation and Māori.
- Annette Michelle Purvis – of Christchurch. For services to athletics.
- Catherine Agnes Quinn – of Auckland. For services to the law and women.
- Dr Charlotte Marewa Severne – of Wellington. For services to Māori and science.
- Nicholas George Stanley Smith – of Dunedin. For services to the media and sport.
- Victoria Ursula Spackman – of Wellington. For services to theatre, film and television.
- Sergeant Ross David Stewart – of Hastings. For services to the New Zealand Police and youth.
- Steven Paul Sumner – of Christchurch. For services to football.
- Gary Bertram Troup – of Auckland. For services to sport and the community.
- Gavin Ronald Walker – of Auckland. For services to the State and business.
- Dr Pushpa Wood – of Wellington. For services to financial literacy and interfaith relations.
- Air Vice-Marshal Michael Edward Yardley DSD RNZAF (Rtd) – of Wellington. For services to the New Zealand Defence Force.
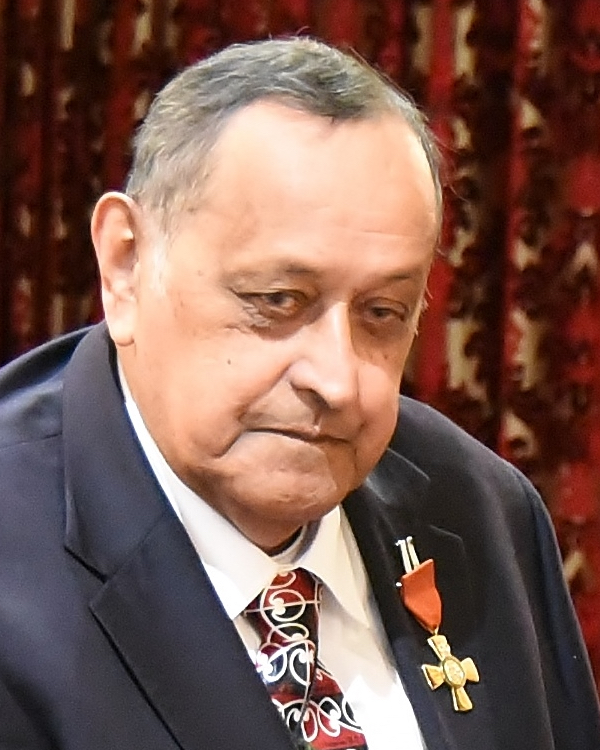
Charlie Crofts

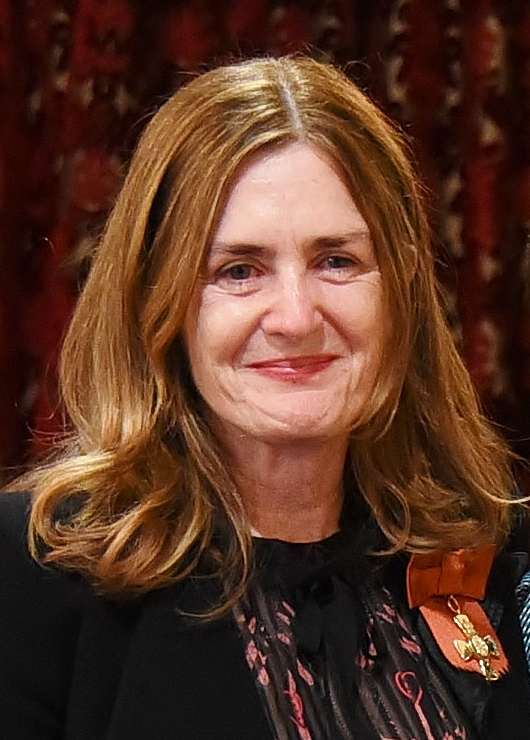
Finola Dwyer

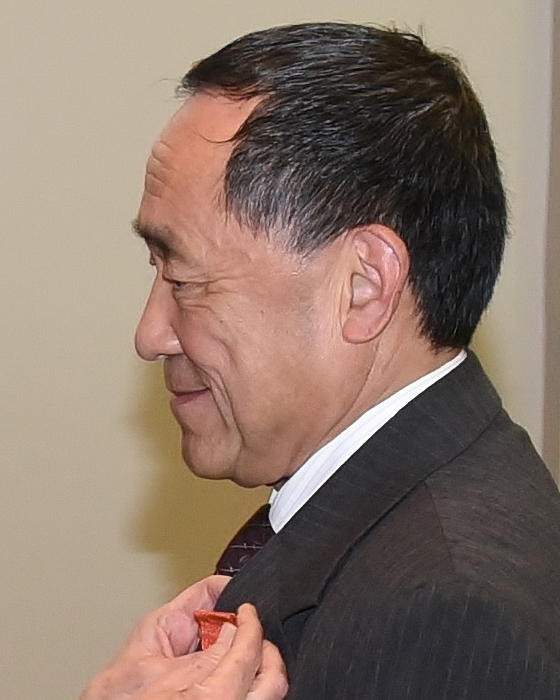
Wei Gao

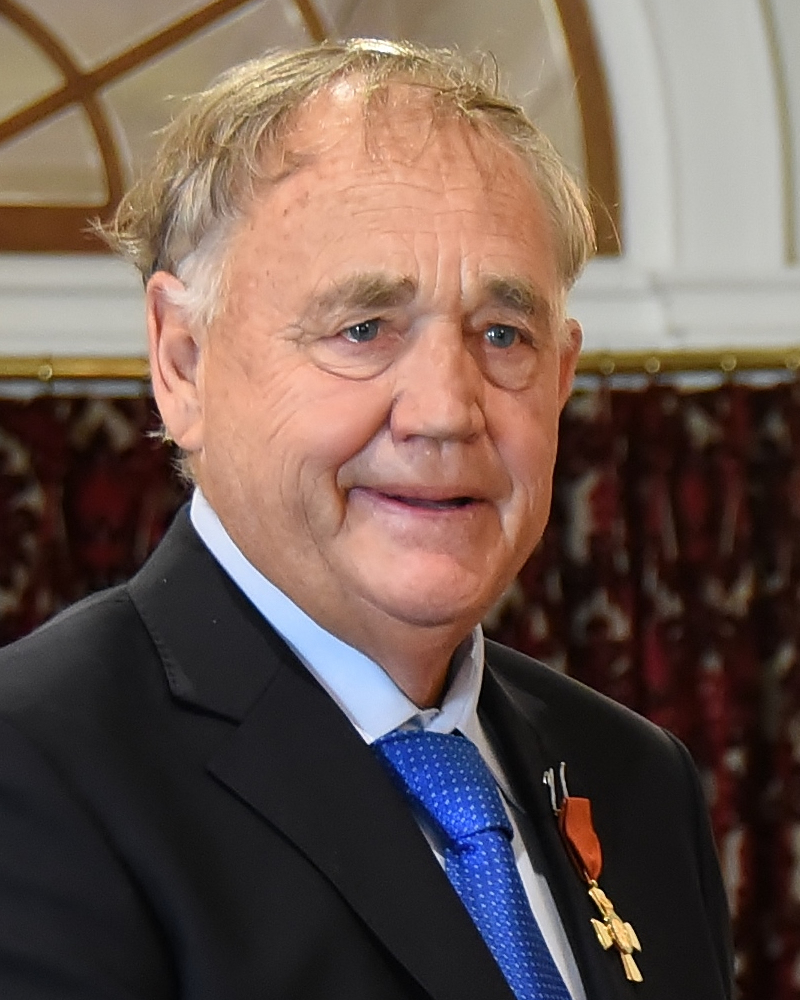
Mark Greenwood

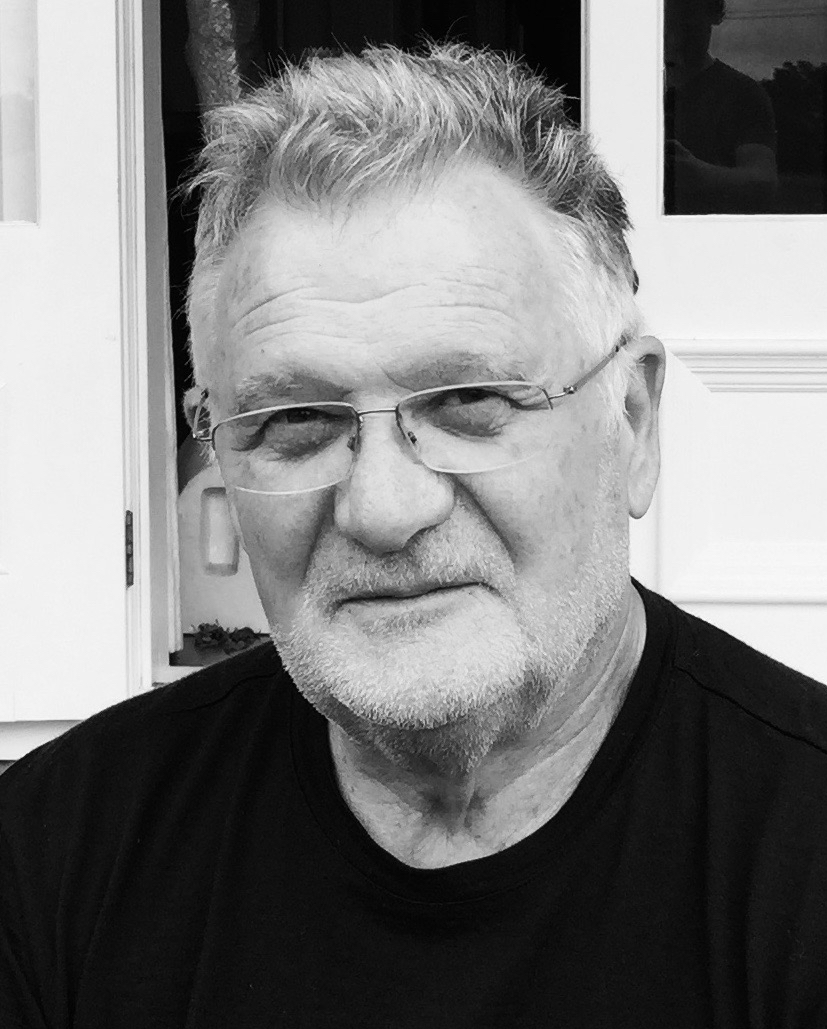
Peter Haythornthwaite

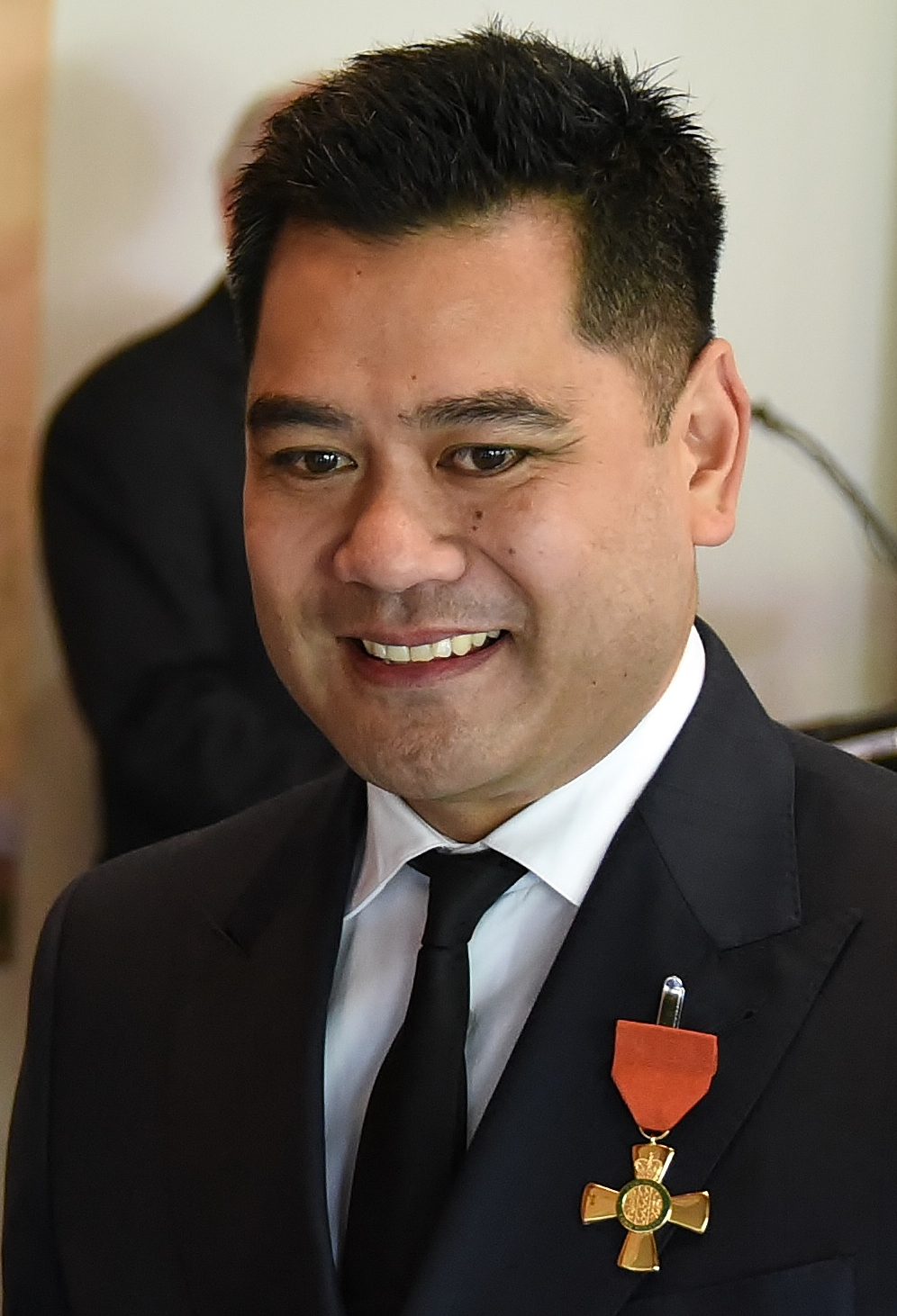
Neil Ieremia

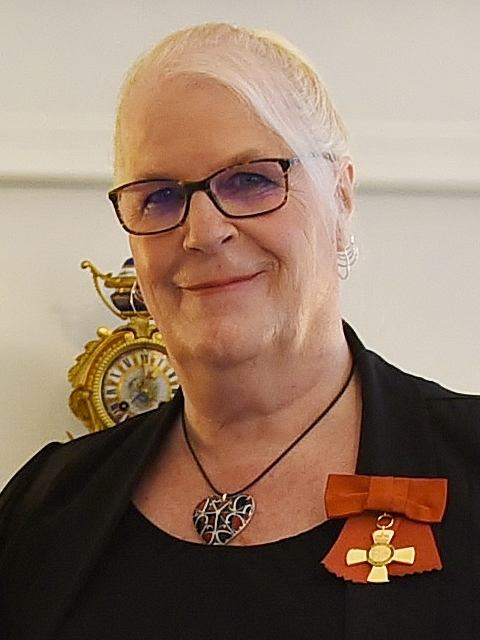
Lexie Matheson

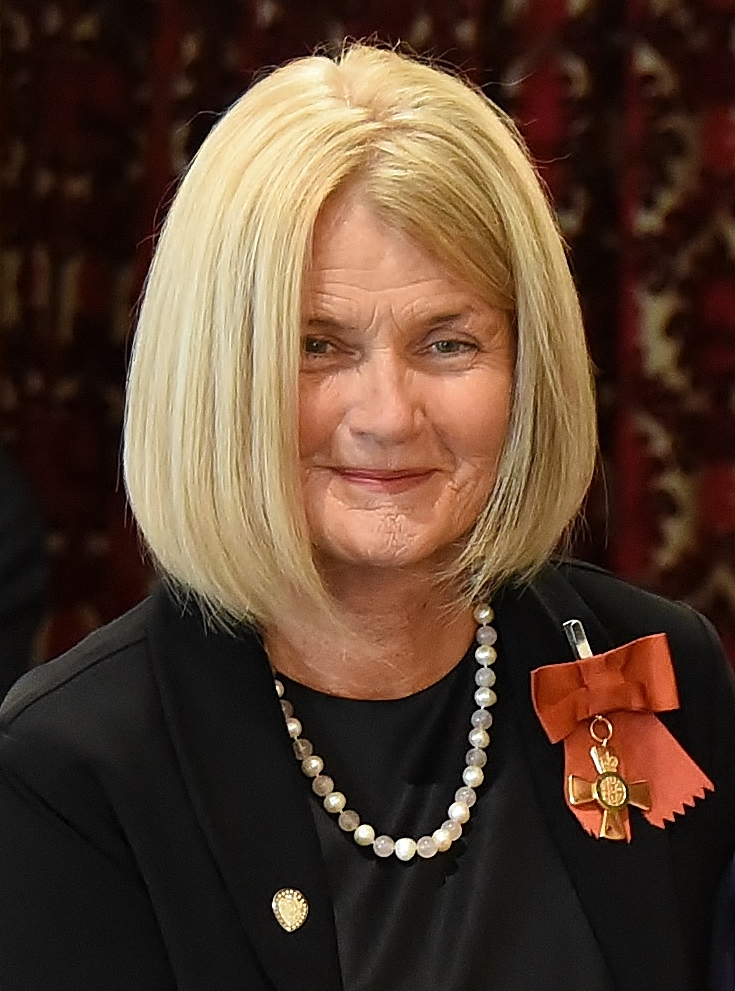
Lesley Murdoch

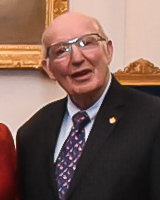
John Perham

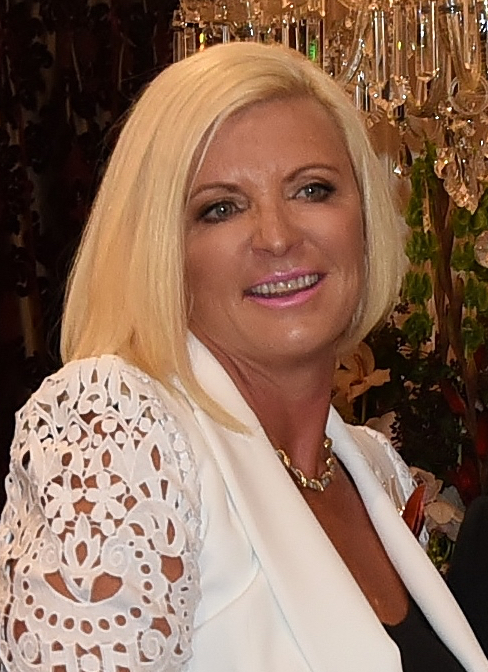
Annette Presley

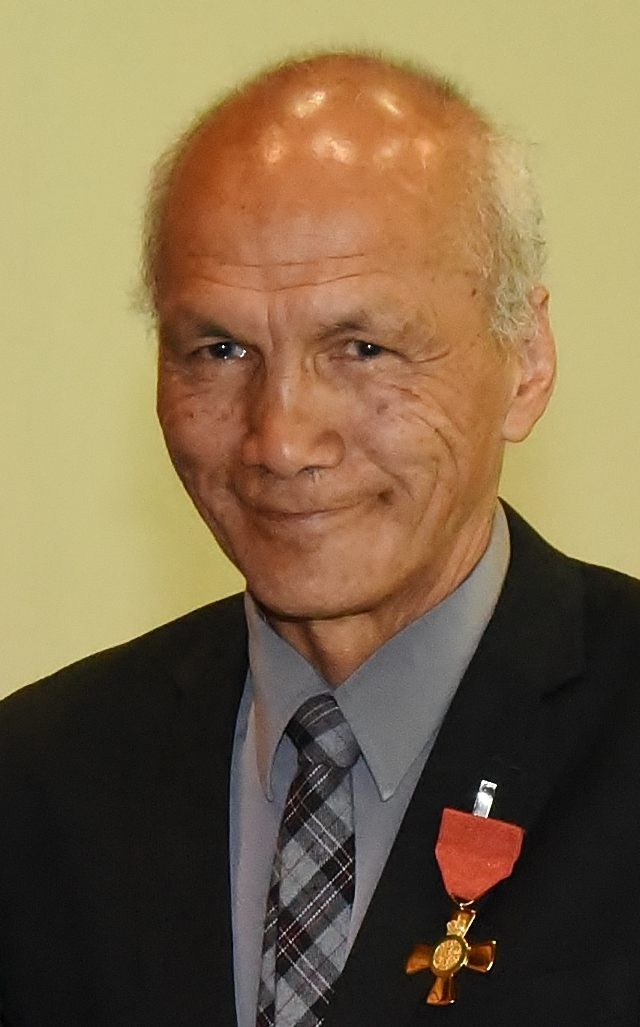
Kevin Prime

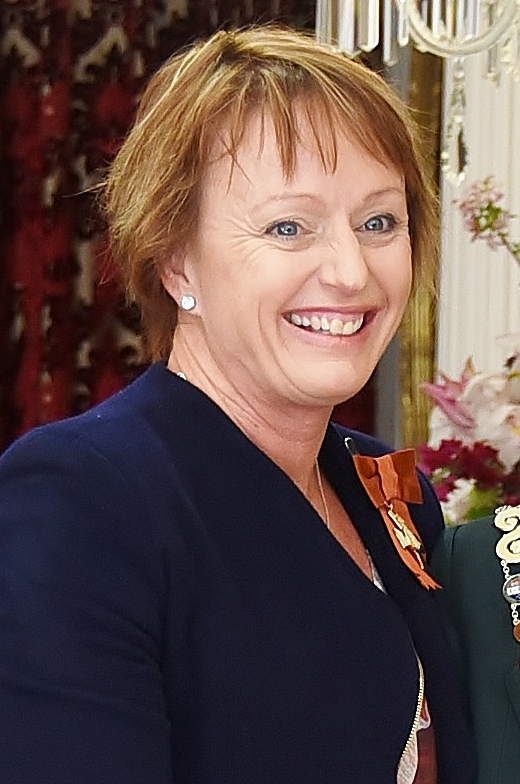
Annette Purvis

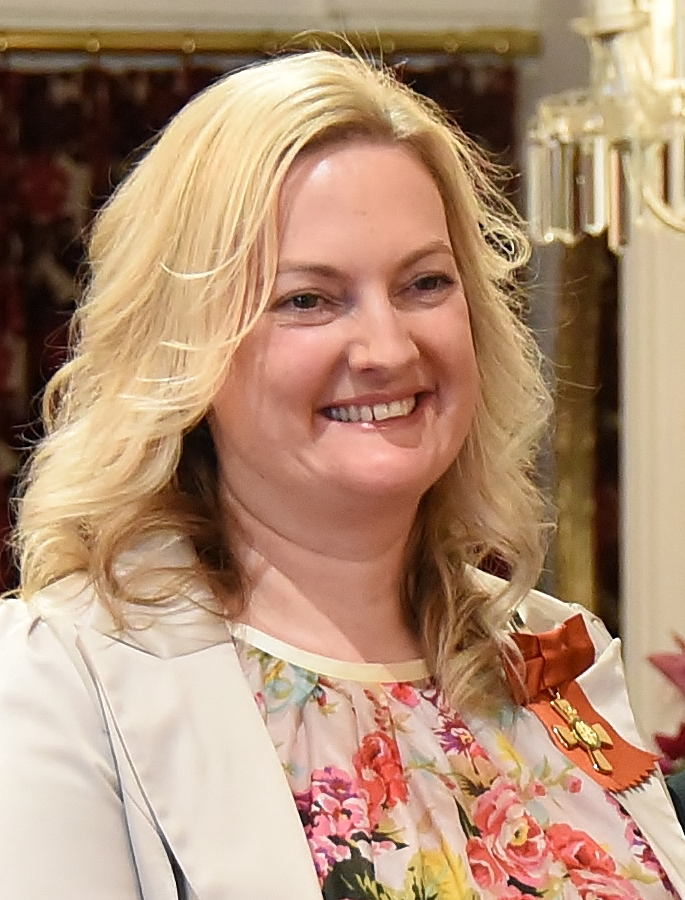
Victoria Spackman

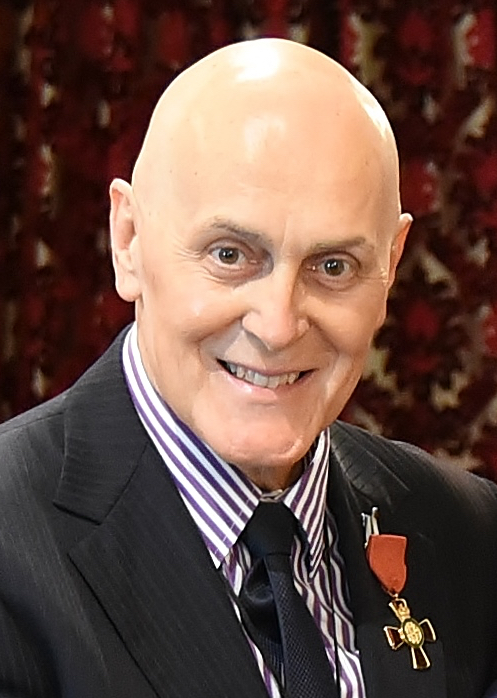
Steve Sumner

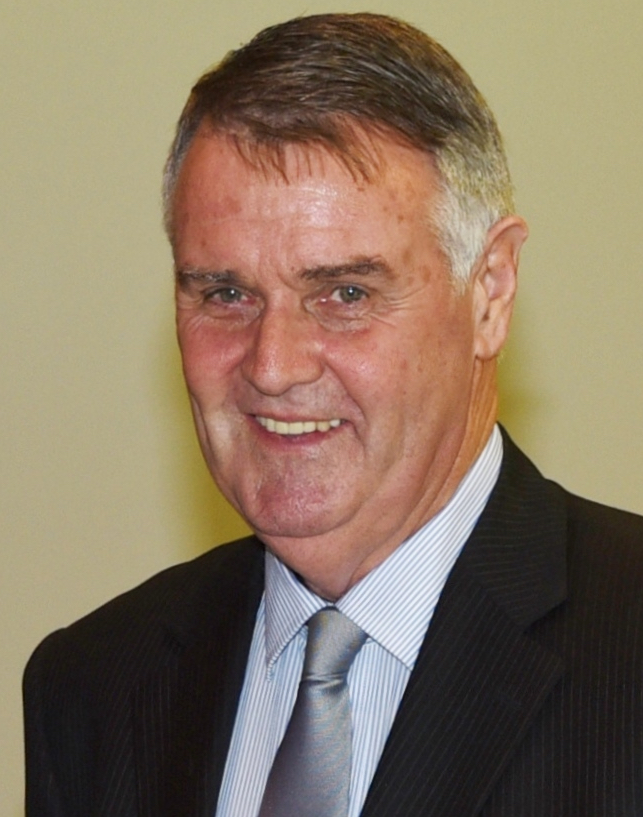
Gary Troup

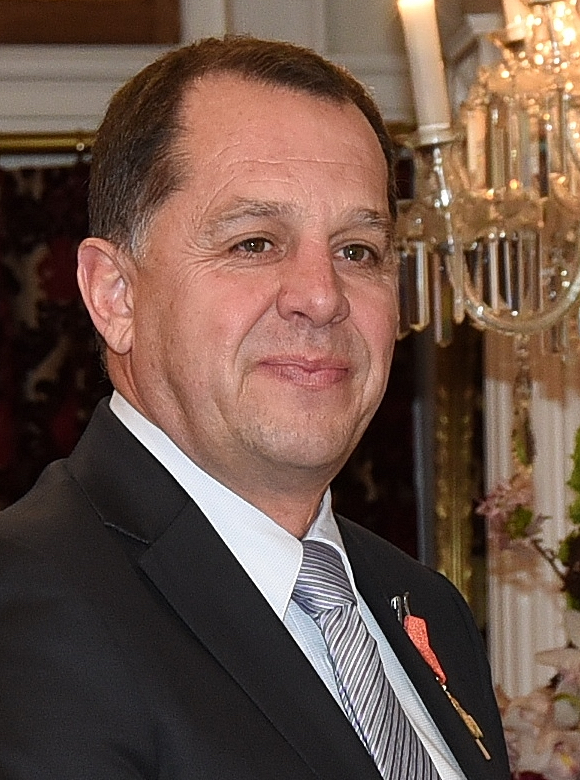
Mike Yardley

=== Member (MNZM) ===
- Viduranga Aruna Abeygoonesekera – of Wellington. For services to New Zealand–Sri Lanka relations and the Sri Lankan community.
- Dr Maurice Rewi Alley – of Palmerston North. For services to conservation and education.
- Dr Patrick Geoffrey Alley – of Auckland. For services to health.
- Sandra Alofivae – of Auckland. For services to the Pacific community and youth.
- Maureen Ax – of Palmerston North. For services to dance and youth.
- Elisabeth Judy Bellingham – of Dunedin. For services to classical singing.
- Robert Latham Berry – of Queenstown. For services to the cheese industry.
- Gerald Brackenbury – of Lower Hutt. For services to conservation.
- Tristan David Brebner – of Ōhope. For services to education.
- Christine Brunt – of Blenheim. For services to Girls Brigade.
- Margaret Patricia Bruss – of Alexandra. For services to netball.
- Shelley Campbell – of Auckland. For services to health and people with disabilities.
- Beverley Alice Clark – of Wānaka. For services to health.
- Dr Andrew Ian Dennis – of Nelson. For services to conservation.
- Norman Jack Mei Dewes – of Christchurch. For services to Māori and the community.
- Bruce Henry Dickson – of Whanganui. For services to architecture.
- Jacqueline Duncan – of Christchurch. For services to education.
- Murray Wayne Ellis – of Christchurch. For services to rugby.
- Dr Monique Faleafa – of Auckland. For services to the Pacific community and health.
- Michael David Ferrari JP – of Dunedin. For services to business and the community.
- Marlene Flavell – of Auckland. For services to netball.
- Kieran Francis Fouhy – of Auckland. For services to education.
- Julie Maree Hawke – of Christchurch. For services to Highland dance.
- Stuart Barry Heal – of Cromwell. For services to cricket and the community.
- Barry Wayne Holland – of Auckland. For services to broadcasting.
- Thomas Hullena – of Masterton. For services to education.
- Deborah Mary Jackson – of Lower Hutt. For services to the State.
- John Kent Escott Jarman – of Tauranga. For services to surf life saving.
- Billie Kowhai Jordan – of Auckland. For services to seniors and dance.
- Dianne Janet Kidd – of Auckland. For services to health administration.
- Susana Lemisio – of Lower Hutt. For services to the Tokelau community and early childhood education.
- Andrew Graeme Lowe – of Havelock North. For services to conservation.
- Dr Nadarajah Manoharan – of Palmerston North. For services to health.
- Dr Ralph Marrett – of Auckland. For services to the New Zealand Defence Force.
- Hugh Donald McCutcheon – of Minnesota. For services to volleyball.
- Genevieve Therese McLachlan – of Upper Hutt. For services to people with disabilities.
- John Kenneth Moreland – of Cambridge. For services to rugby.
- Mele Fakatali Nemaia – of Auckland. For services to the Niuean community.
- Maru Eva Nihoniho – of Auckland. For services to the gaming industry and mental health.
- Dr Garry Harold Nixon – of Alexandra. For services to rural health.
- Hariata Hariet Paikea – of Rotorua. For services to health and Māori.
- Sarah Paykel – of Auckland. For services to business.
- Barry Douglas Petherick – of Levin. For services to education.
- Anthony James Pope – of Rotorua. For services to education.
- Tina Tangi Whaiora Porou – of Tūrangi. For services to Māori and the environment.
- Cecilia Jane Rock – of Auckland. For services to the gay, lesbian, bisexual, transgender and intersex communities.
- Gary Stewart Schofield – of Virginia. For services as an artist and to New Zealand–United States relations.
- Rahera Shortland – of Kerikeri. For services to Māori, education and television.
- Barry Whitley Sinclair – of Auckland. For services to cricket.
- Kenneth Raymond Sowden – of Christchurch. For services to Paralympic sport.
- Andrew Francis Barr Stevenson – of Gisborne. For services to aviation.
- Graham John Sycamore – of Invercargill. For services to cycling.
- Teresa Tepania-Ashton – of Wellington. For services to Māori and business.
- Garnet Donald Tregonning – of Auckland. For services to orthopaedics.
- Amalia Tuffield – of Whanganui. For services to special education.
- John David Ure – of Auckland. For services to music.
- Mervyn Douglas Thomas Utting – of Gisborne. For services to sheep dog trials.
- Dr Peetikuia Bessie Wainui – of Gisborne. For services to Māori, health and education.
- Peter David Wilson – of Ōtaki. For services to business.
- Margaret Woolf – of Auckland. For services to gymnastics.
- Graham Stewart Young JP – of Tauranga. For services to education.

Honorary

- Dr Haruhisa Handa – of Tokyo. For services to golf and philanthropy.
- Professor Emeritus Ryuji Komatsu – of Tokyo. For services to education and New Zealand–Japan relations.
- Tara Maire Ashe Lorigan – of Auckland. For services to business and women.
- Alice Jeanette Lynch – of Alaska. For services to education.
- Maurice Butler Lynch – of Alaska. For services to education.
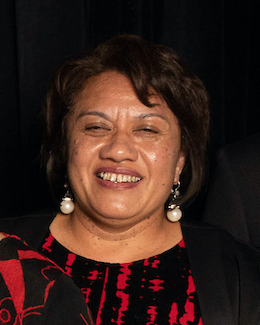
Sandra Alofivae

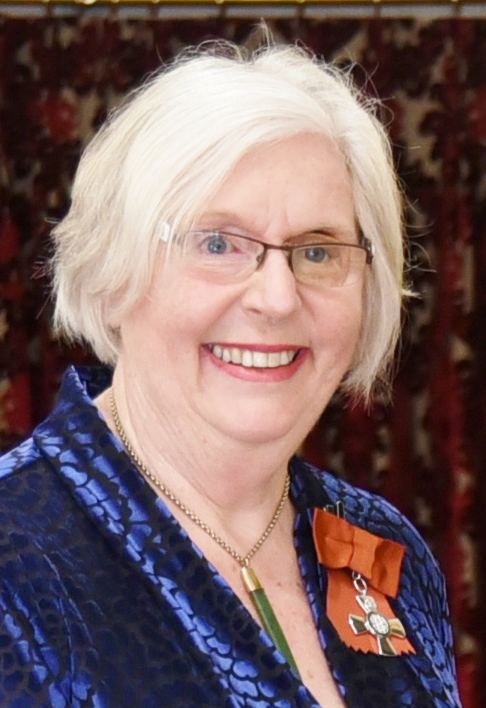
Judy Bellingham

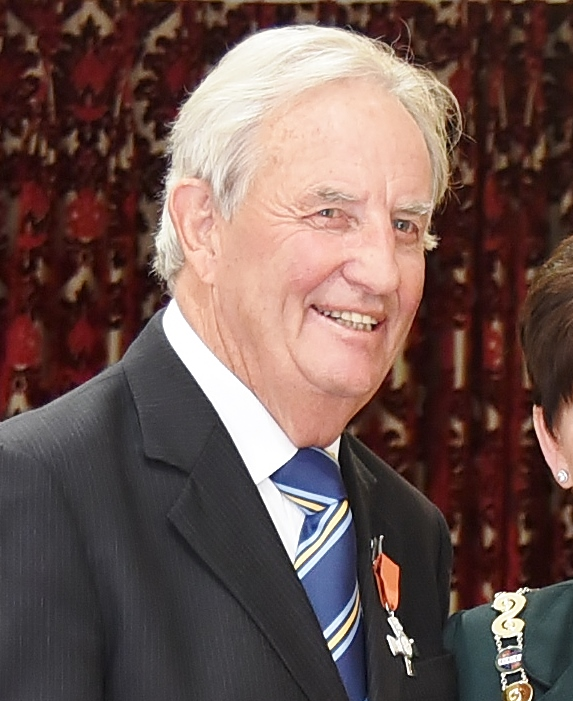
Bob Berry

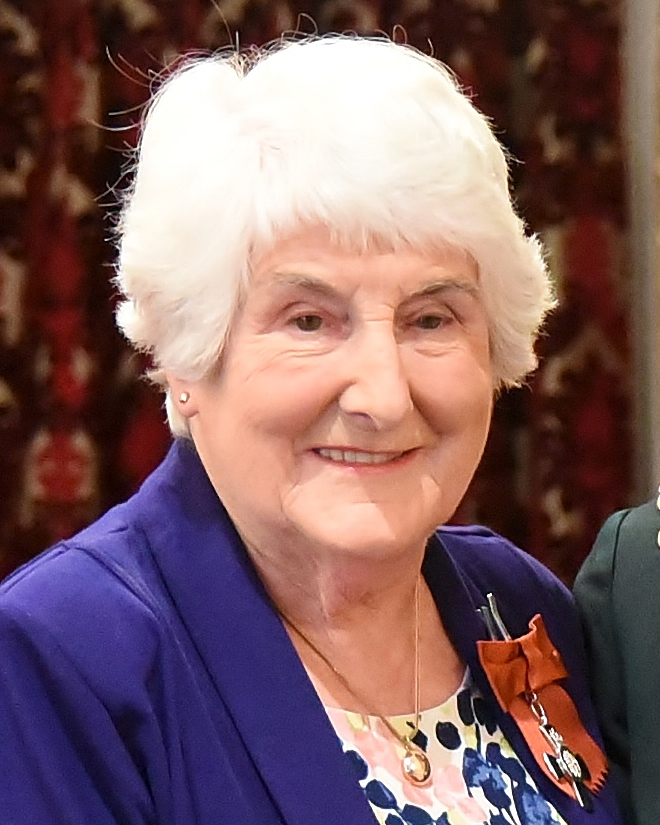
Margaret Bruss

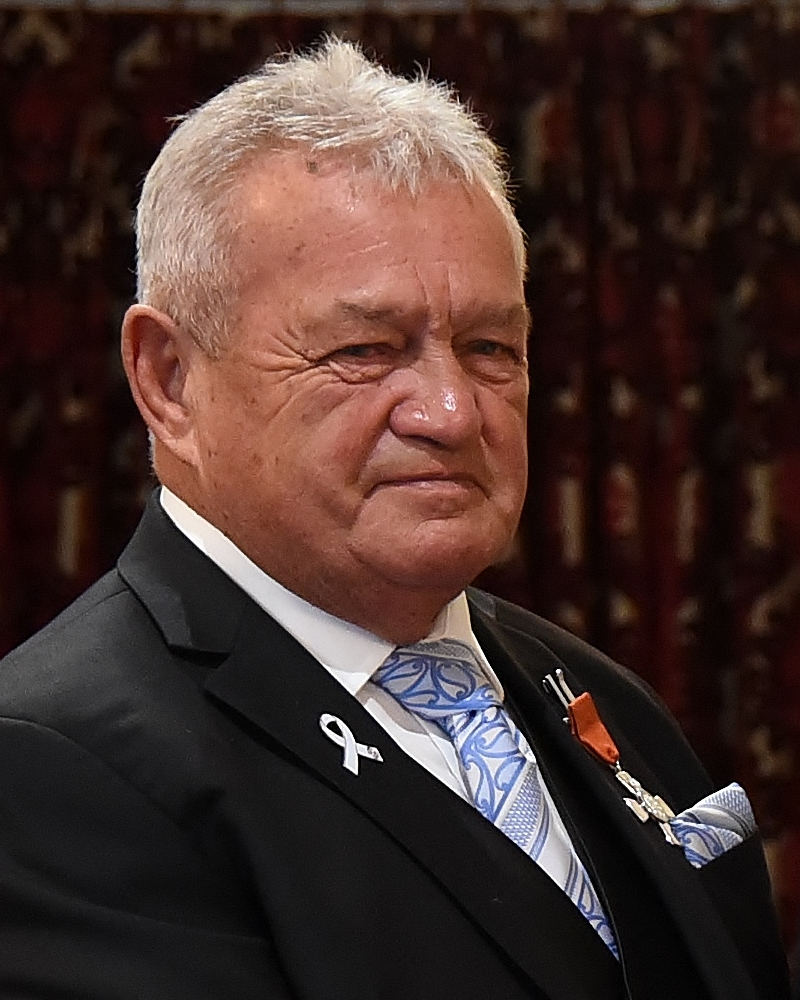
Norm Dewes

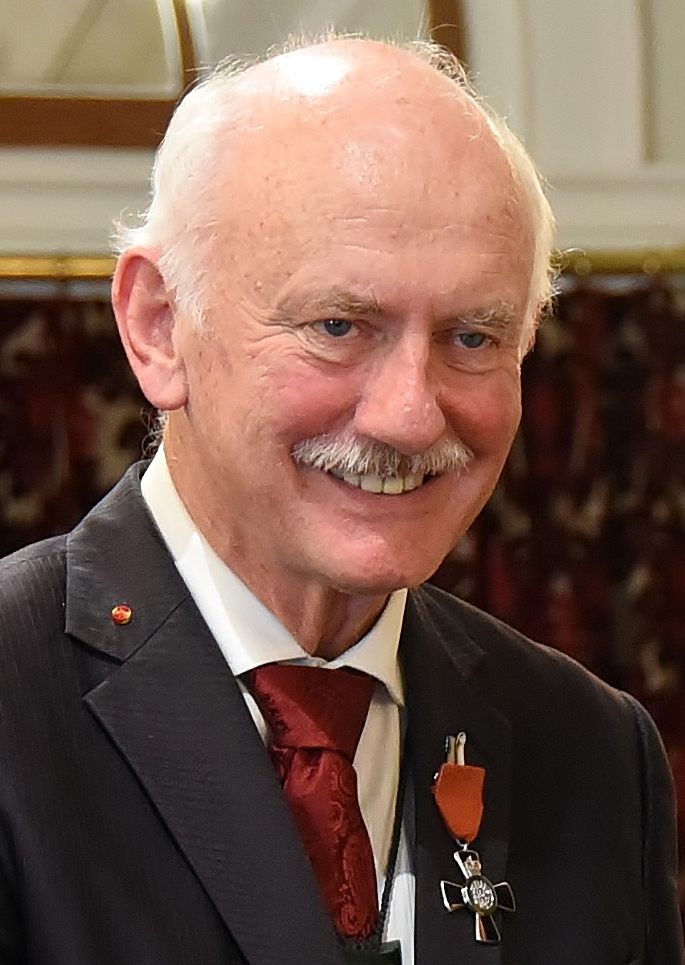
Kieran Fouhy

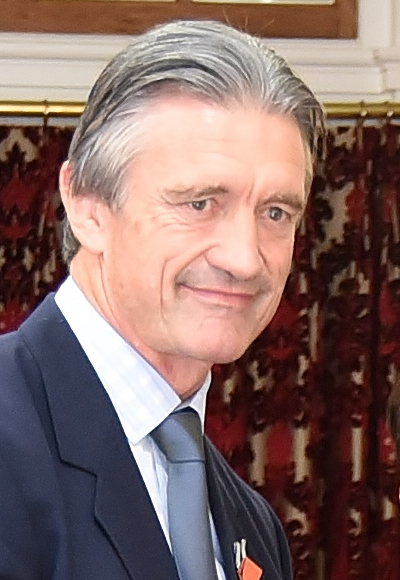
Tom Hullena

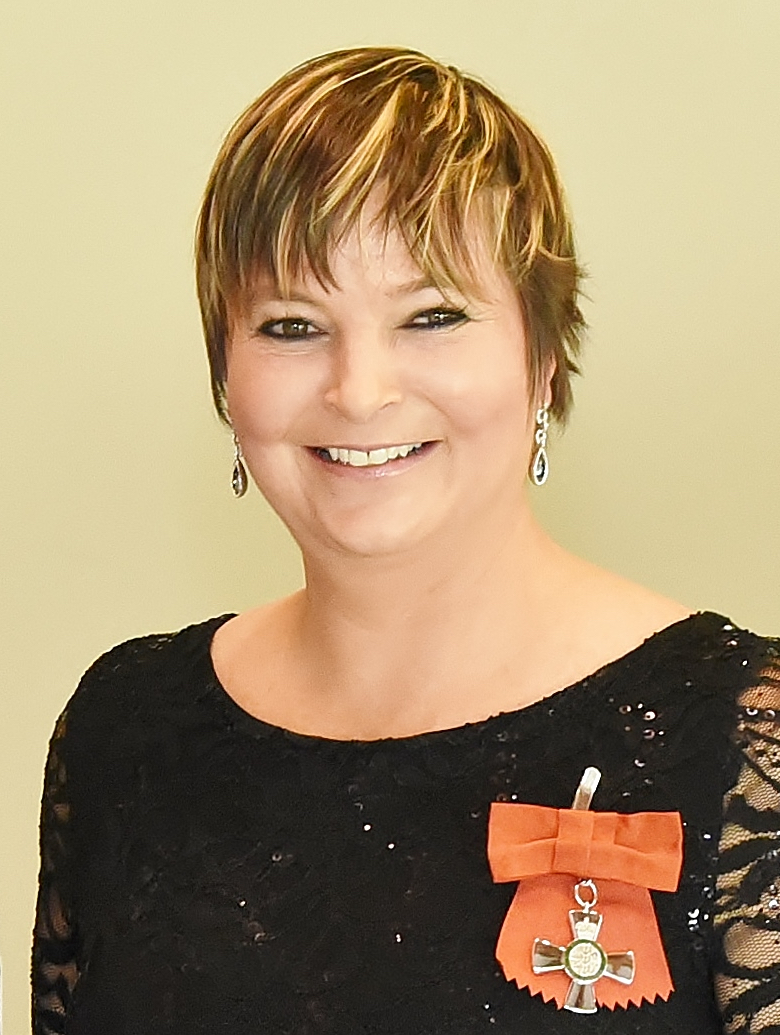
Billie Jordan

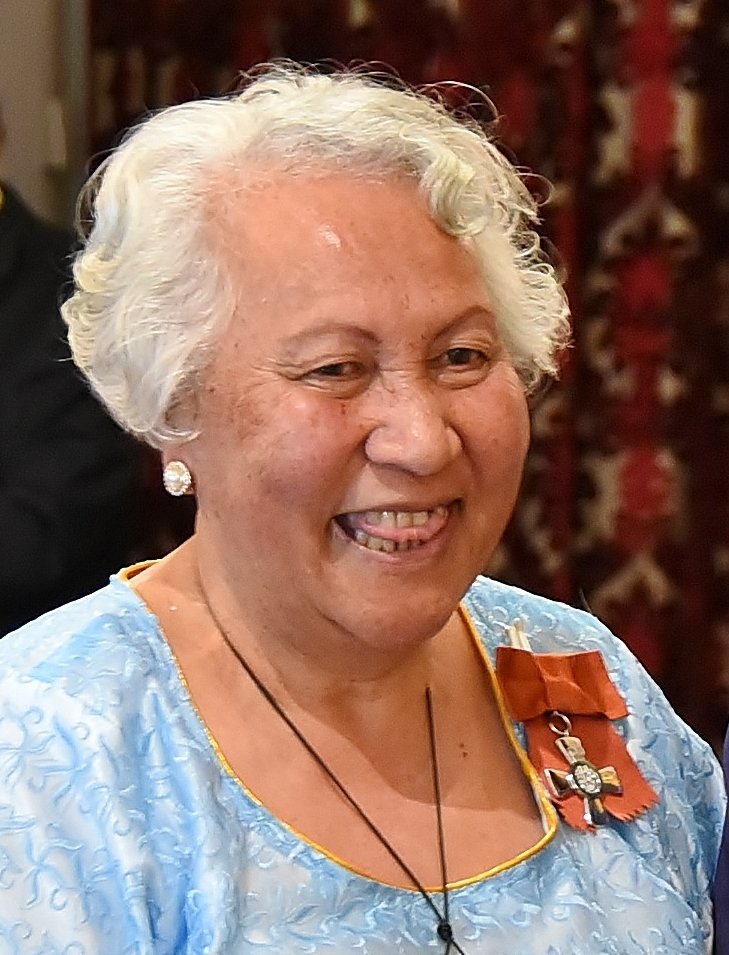
Susana Lemisio

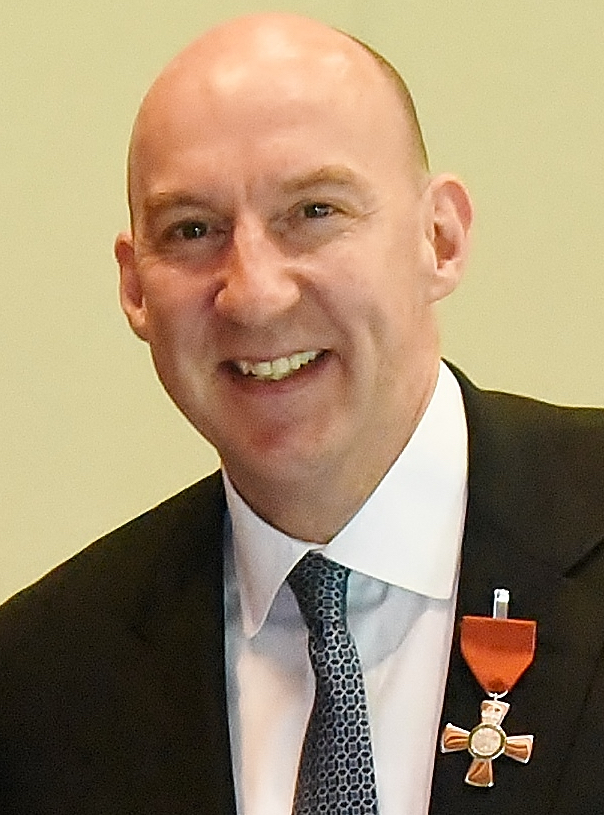
Hugh McCutcheon

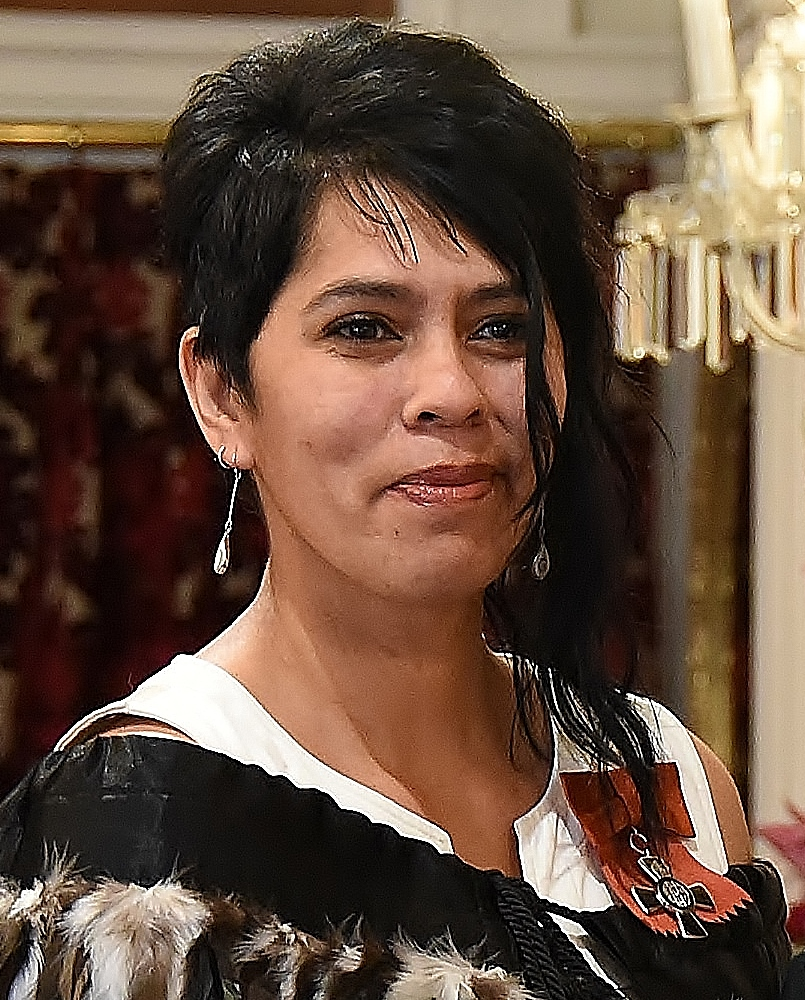
Maru Nihoniho

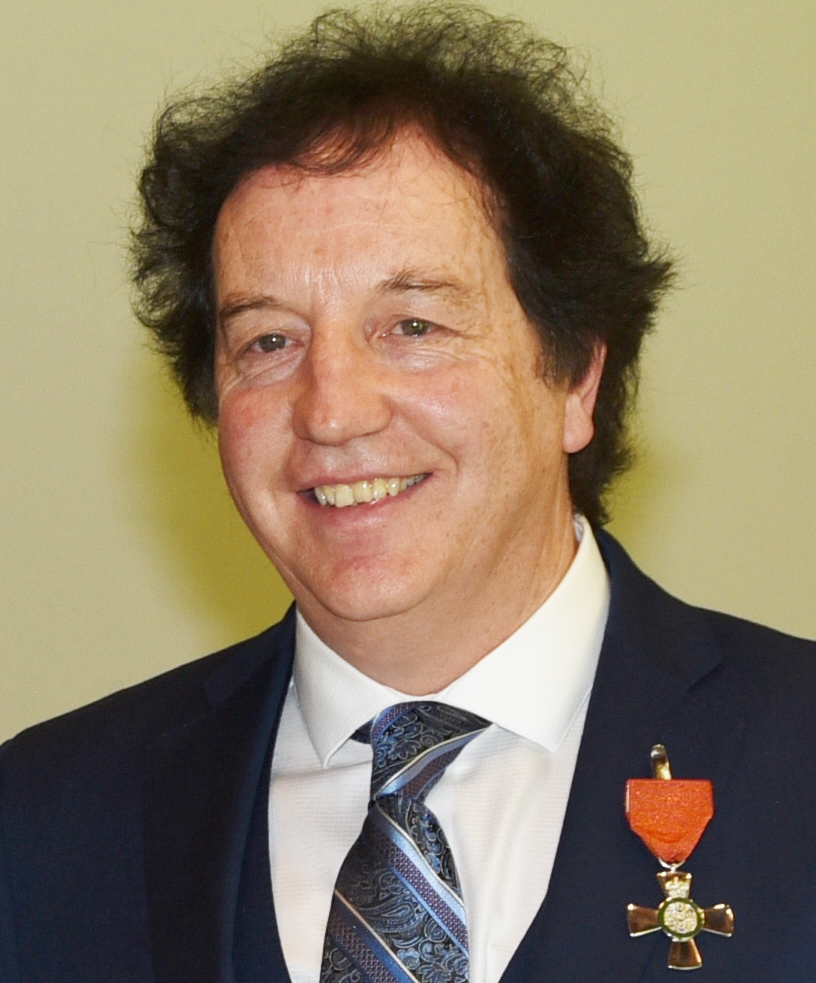
Gary Schofield

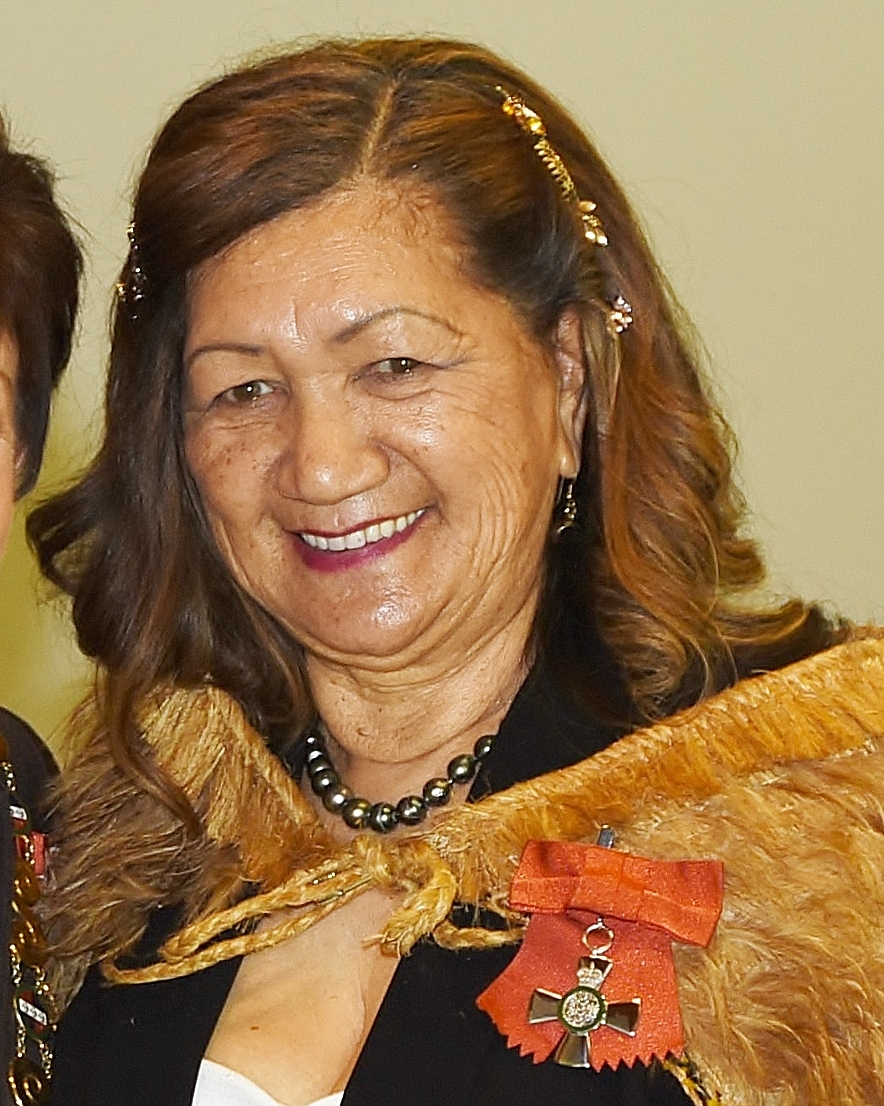
Rahera Shortland

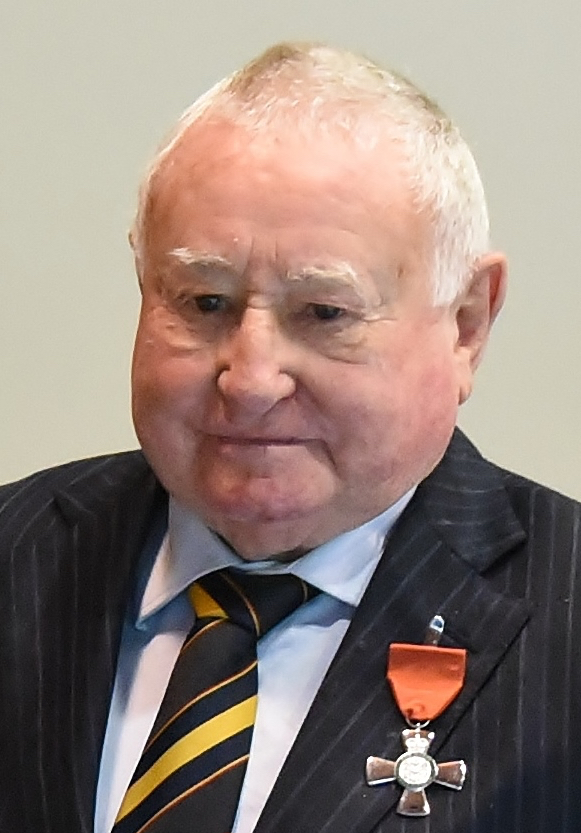
Barry Sinclair

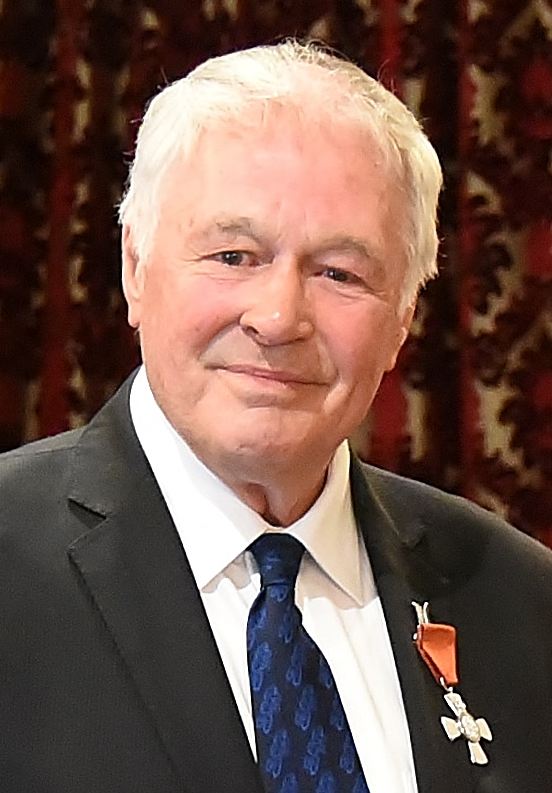
Graham Sycamore

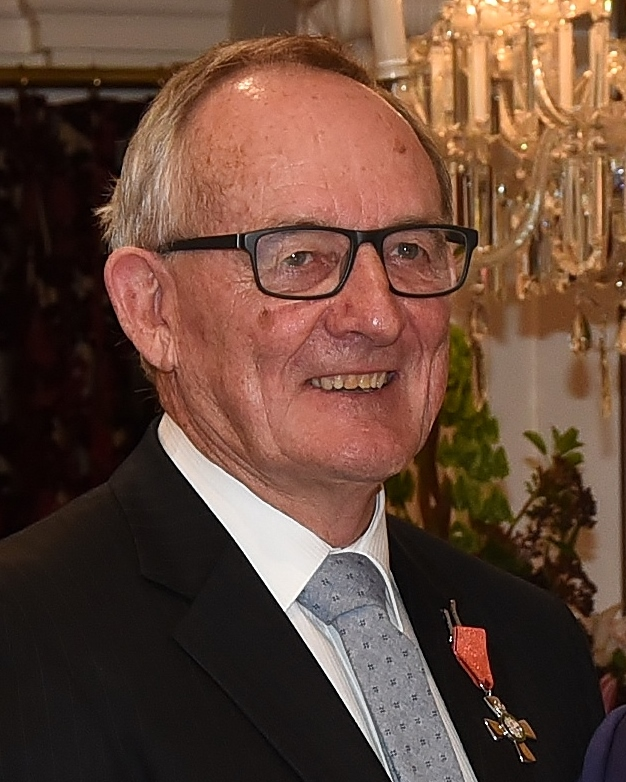
Graham Young

== Companion of the Queen's Service Order (QSO) ==
- Neil Douglas Boniface JP – of Invercargill. For services to local government and the community.
- Judge Sharon Elizabeth Couper McAuslan – of Auckland. For services to the judiciary.
- Stephanie McIntyre – of Wellington. For services to the community.
- Lynda Mooij – of Invercargill. For services to foster care.
- David Jonathan Noble – of Wellington. For services to the State.
- Phillippa Catherine Smith – of Wellington. For services to the State.
- Adrienne Fay von Tunzelmann – of Tauranga. For services to governance and the community.

Honorary

- Johannes Mooij – of Invercargill. For services to foster care.
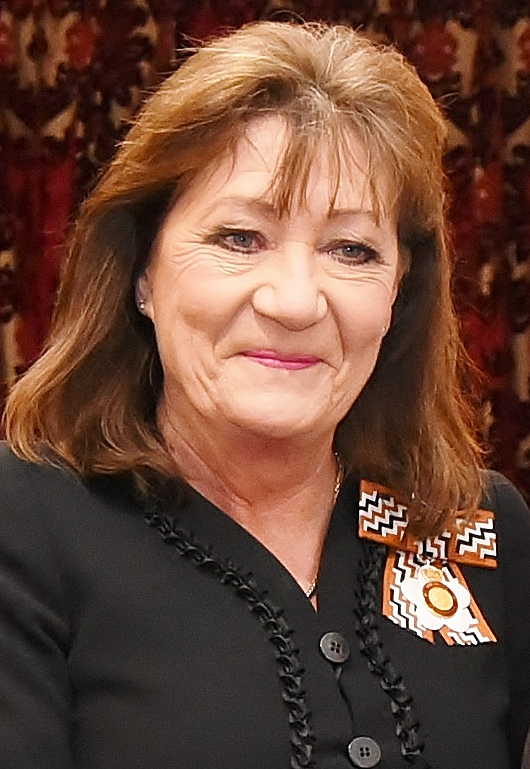
Sharon McAuslan

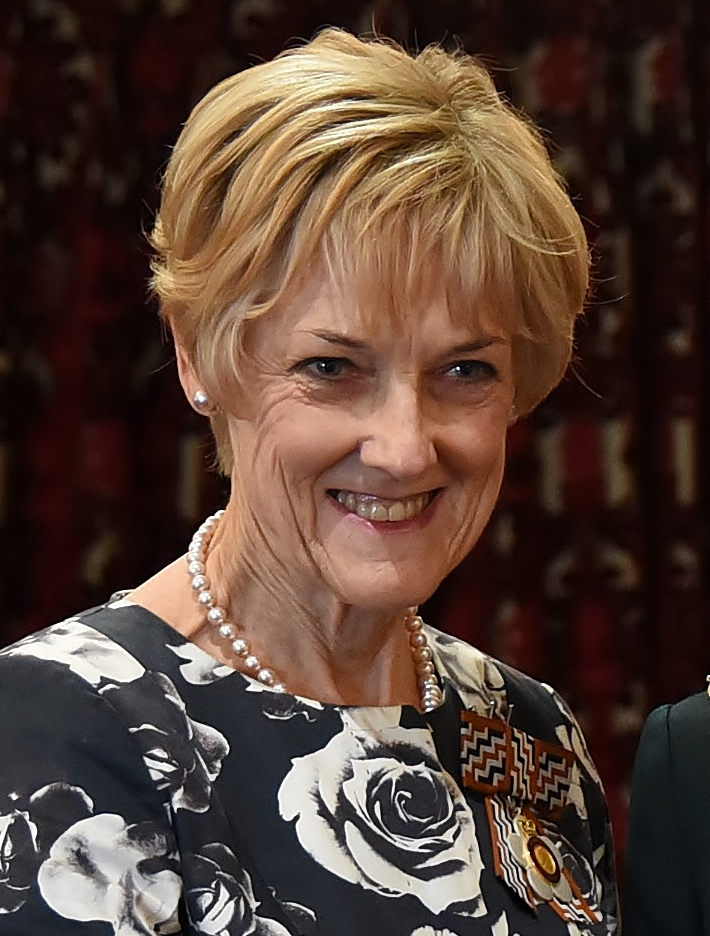
Adrienne von Tunzelmann

== Queen's Service Medal (QSM) ==
- Lesley Joan Anderson – of Auckland. For services to scouting.
- Karnail Singh Badhan JP – of Auckland. For services to the Indian community.
- Andrew Stuart Barber JP – of Nelson. For services to karate and the community.
- Raymond Garth Beatson JP – of Auckland. For services to the community and veterans.
- Shane William Beech – of Te Puke. For services to the New Zealand Fire Service.
- Mark Edwin Bentham – of Tauranga. For services to the New Zealand Fire Service.
- Douglas James Blair – of Tokoroa. For services to the community and theatre.
- Robin Brockie – of New Plymouth. For services to the community.
- Richard George Carruthers – of Nelson. For services to theatre and osteopathy.
- Constance Margaret Dando – of Dunedin. For services to senior citizens.
- Lynley Barbara Dear – of Invercargill. For services as an author and to historical research.
- Clifford Henry Deery JP – of Auckland. For services to the New Zealand Fire Service and the community.
- Reverend John Francis Drylie – of Hokitika. For services to the community.
- Kerry Veda Duncan – of Napier. For services to the community.
- Reverend Tevita Finau – of Auckland. For services to the Tongan community.
- Ruari Ingram Foley – of Waimate. For services to the community.
- Sylvia Raima Forester – of Waitōtara. For services to the New Zealand Fire Service.
- Gary William Fowler JP – of Hikuai. For services to the community and agriculture.
- Blair Donald Marie Furlong – of Napier. For services to cricket and rugby.
- Jennifer Anne Gallagher JP – of Darfield. For services to the community.
- Trevor Harold Gibson – of Whanganui. For services to maritime safety.
- Lance Girling-Butcher – of New Plymouth. For services to the blind and seniors.
- John Allan Harlick – of Tuakau. For services to the New Zealand Fire Service and the community.
- Andrea Hawkless – of Auckland. For services to people with severe epilepsy.
- Neville Grant Haydon – of Auckland. For services to horticulture.
- Graeme William Humphries – of Te Anau. For services to the New Zealand Fire Service.
- Roy Alexander Lithgow – of Stratford. For services to philanthropy, rugby and the community.
- George Paul London – of Marton. For services to the community.
- Lynda Mary Macdonald JP – of Christchurch. For services to the community.
- Murray Ian Mansfield – of Palmerston North. For services to pipe bands.
- Dr Robert Malcolm McIlroy – of Wellington. For services to health and the community.
- Pareaute Polly Nathan – of Kaitaia. For services to Māori and education.
- Nanette Nathoo – of Auckland. For services to the Indian community.
- Ian Greville Paterson – of Wellington. For services to philanthropy.
- Sheila Claire Patten – of New Plymouth. For services to dance.
- Nicholas Anthony Puharich – of Dargaville. For services to the community.
- Graeme Boyd Robertson JP – of Riverton. For services to sport.
- Sister Mary Scanlon – of Wellington. For services to hospice care.
- Selma Theresa Scott – of Christchurch. For services to the Pacific community.
- Tony Scott – of Kaikohe. For services to the New Zealand Fire Service and the community.
- Reverend Raunikau Stainton – of Hicks Bay. For services to Māori.
- Arihia Amiria Stirling – of Auckland. For services to education and Māori.
- Melville Arthur Syme – of Kaikōura. For services to the community.
- Patrick Harry Taylor JP – of Tauranga. For services to the community.
- Paul Scott Trenwith – of Hamilton. For services to country music.
- Bruce Manuel Tuanui – of the Chatham Islands. For services to conservation.
- Elaine Frances Tyrrell – of Nelson. For services to health.
- Jacob Cornelis van Dorsser – of Rotorua. For services to the environment.
Doug Blair

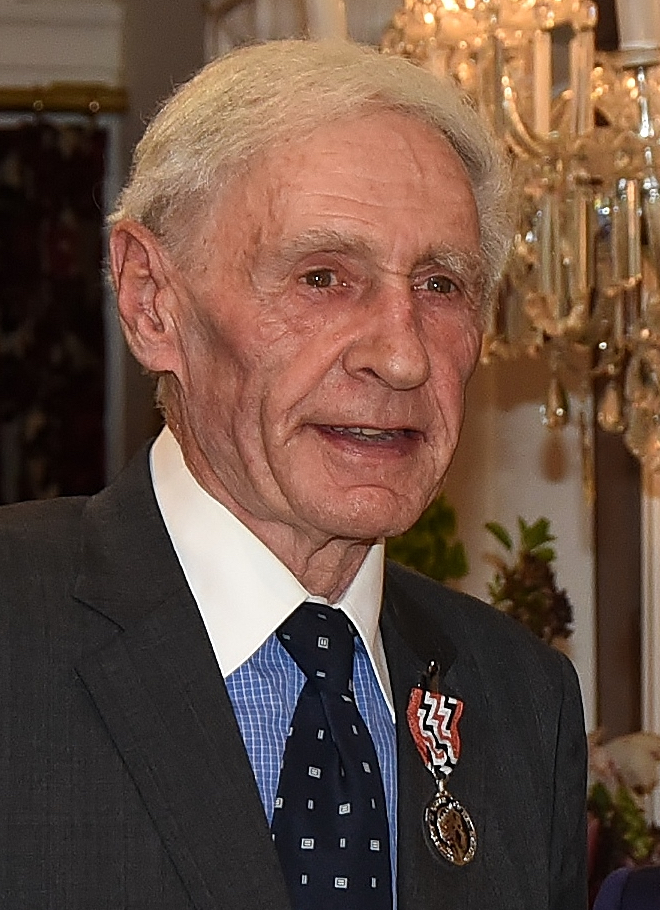
John Drylie

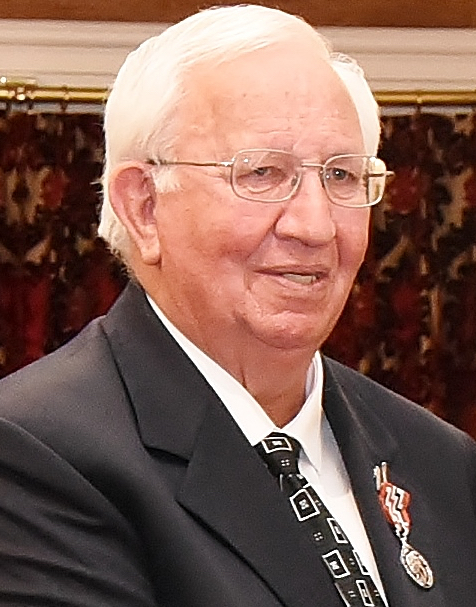
Blair Furlong

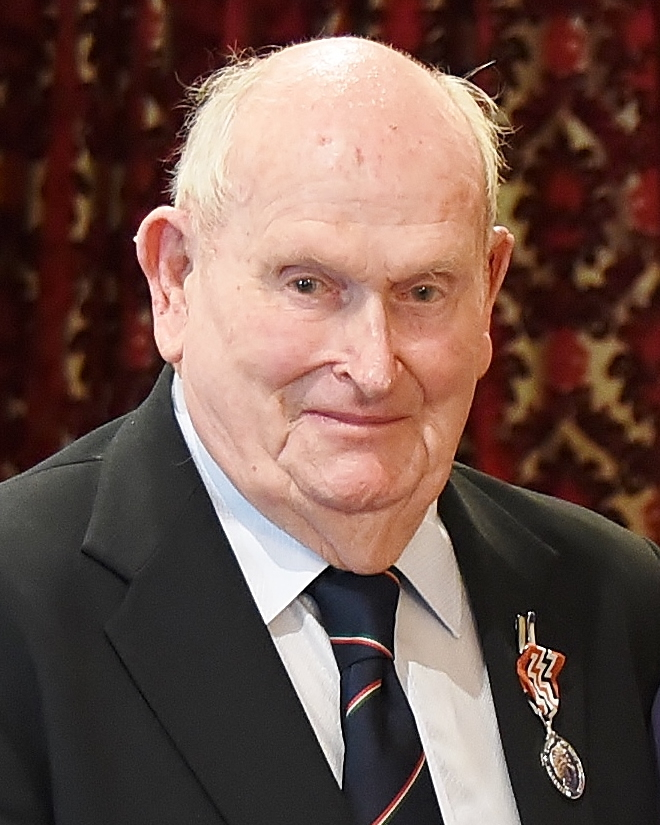
Trevor Gibson

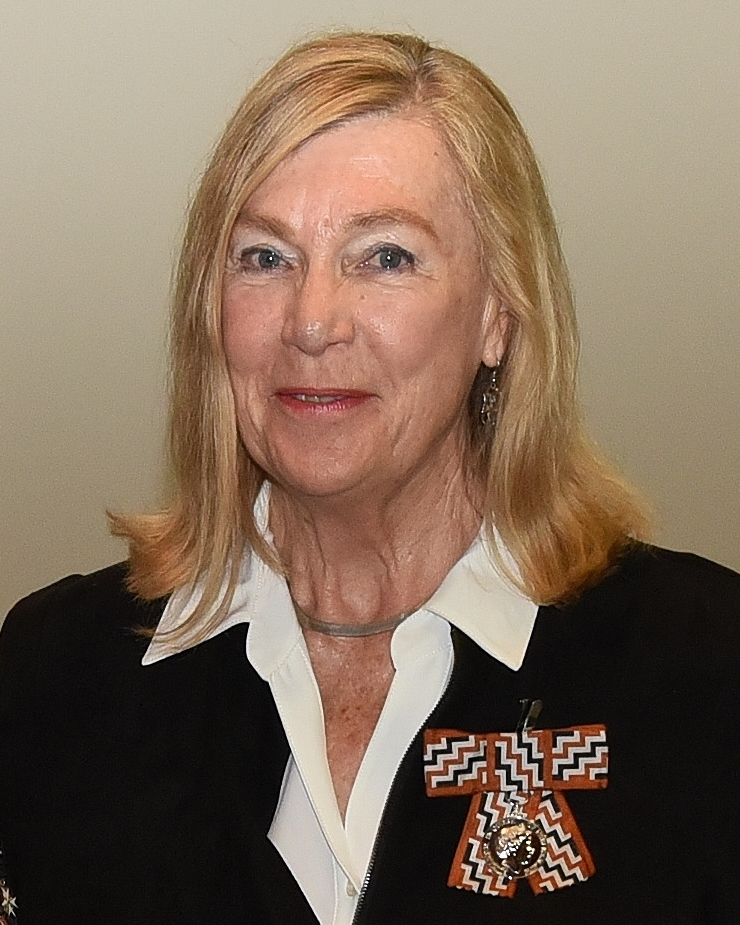
Andrea Hawkless

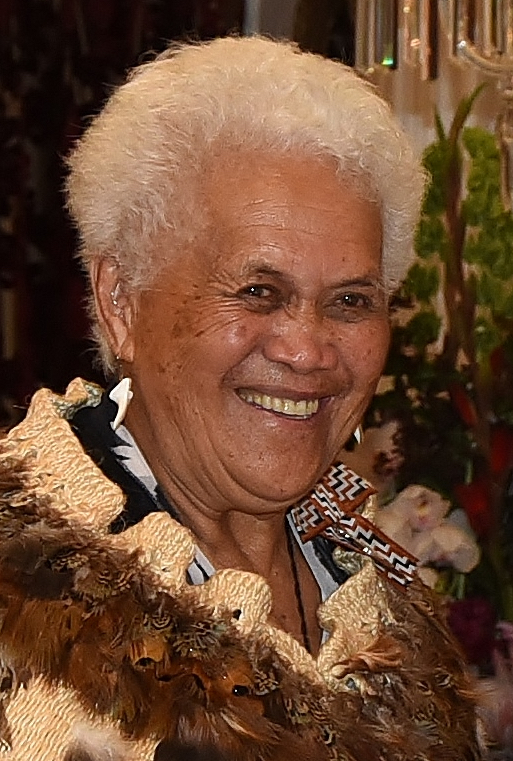
Pareaute Nathan

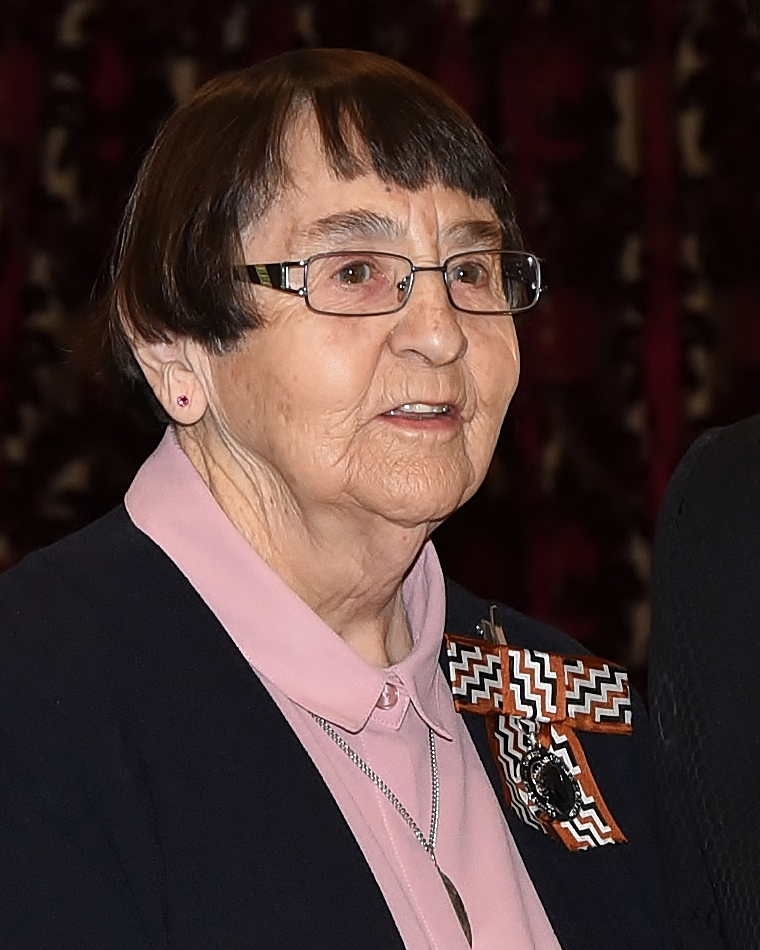
Mary Scanlon

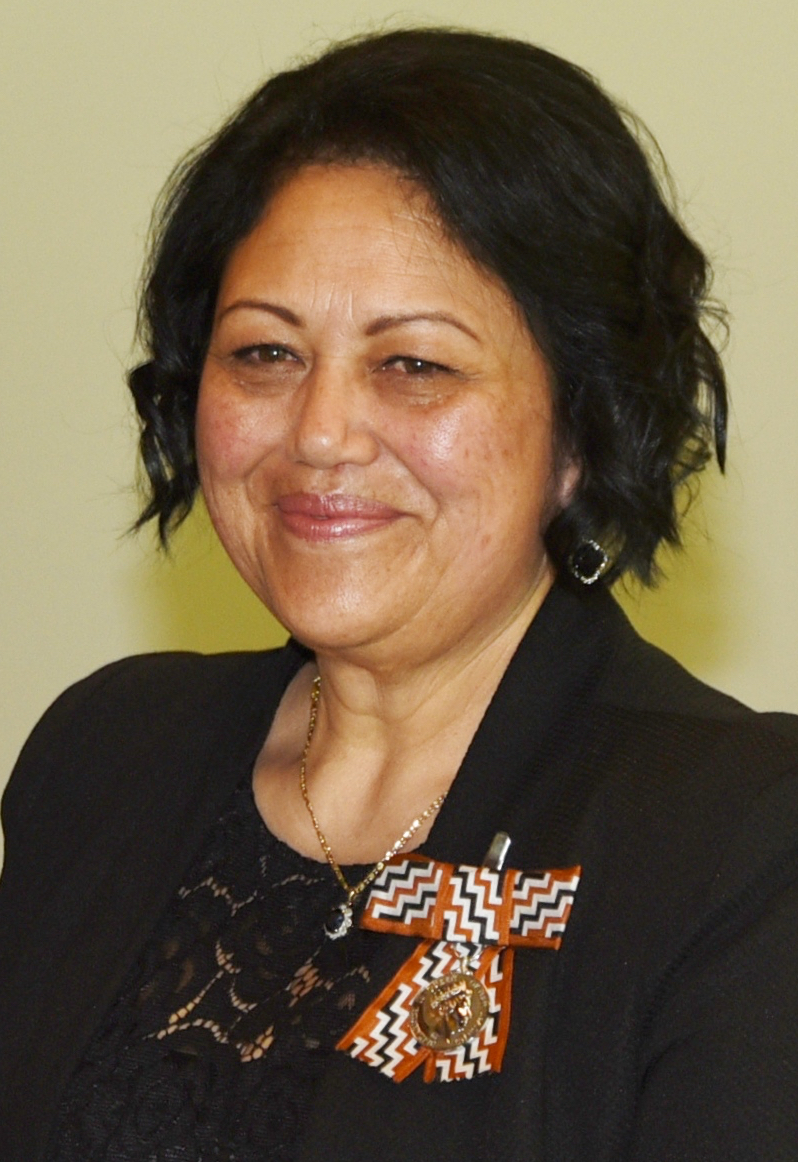
Arihia Stirling

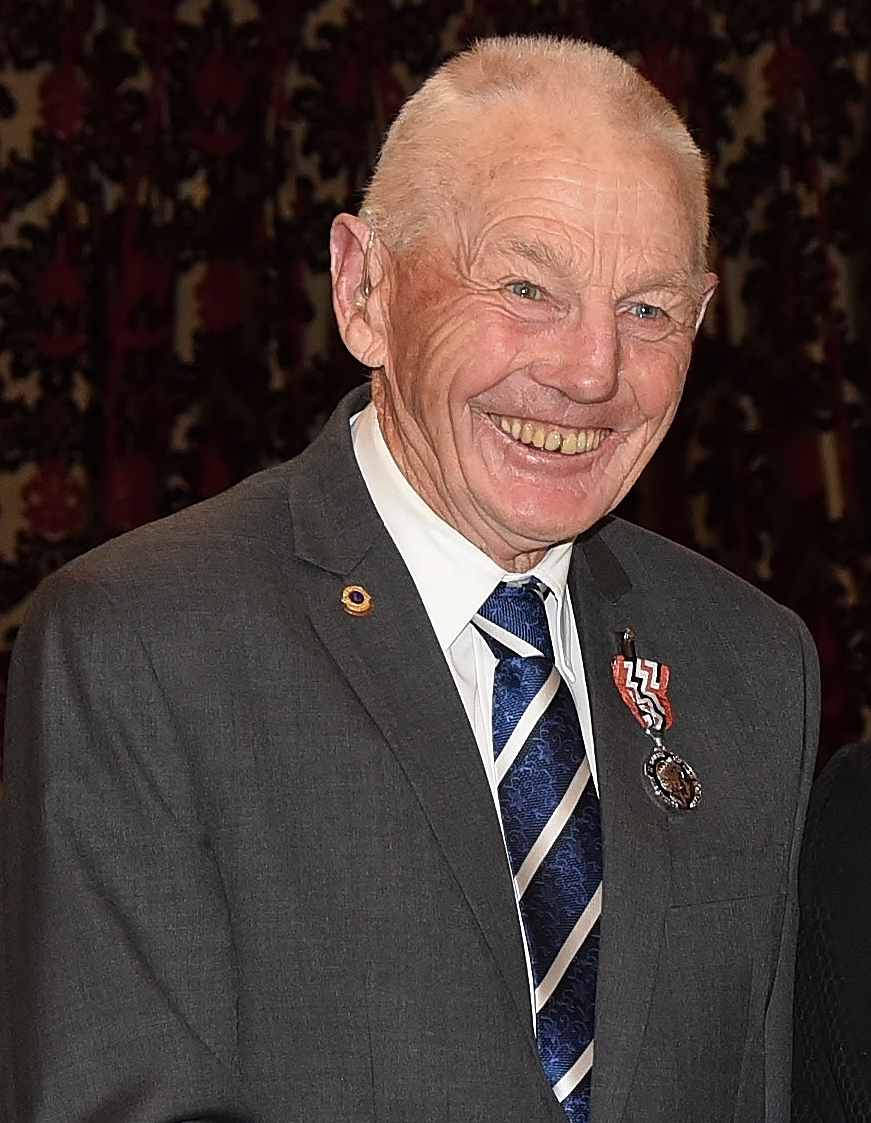
Melville Syme

== New Zealand Distinguished Service Decoration (DSD) ==
- Lieutenant Colonel Anthony Clinton Childs – of Upper Hutt. For services to the New Zealand Defence Force.
- Serviceman C. For services to the New Zealand Defence Force.
- Serviceman J. For services to the New Zealand Defence Force.
