= Sharon McAuslan =

New Zealand jurist (1945–2019)

Sharon McAuslan QSO
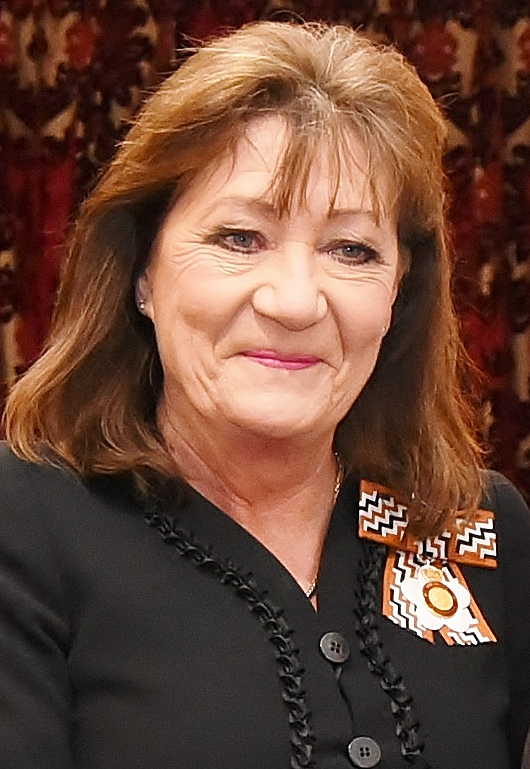
- McAuslan in 2016

Judge of the District Court of New Zealand
- In office 2010–2016

Personal details
- Born: Sharon Elizabeth Couper Rutherford; 1945
- Died: 24 May 2019 (aged 73–74) Edinburgh, Scotland
- Spouse: Alexander Norval Murray McAuslan (m. 1977)
- Children: 1

Sharon Elizabeth Couper McAuslan QSO (née Rutherford, 1945 – 24 May 2019) was a New Zealand jurist. She was a judge of the District Court from 1995 to 2015.

== Legal career ==
Born in 1945, McAuslan was admitted to the bar in 1986. She was a senior Crown prosecutor in the Crown Solicitor's Office in Auckland in the early 1990s. She was a team leader in the New Zealand Law Society's litigation skills programme, and in 1991 and 1992, was an examiner at the University of Auckland for overseas lawyers wanting to qualify to practise in New Zealand.

In 1995, McAuslan was appointed to the bench of the Auckland District Court, transferring to the North Shore District Court, and then, in 2000, to the Manukau District Court. She served as the criminal liaison judge for the Pukekohe and Papakura District Courts, and was a member of the District Court Jury Judges Committee. McAuslan retired from the bench in 2015. However, she was appointed an acting District Court Judge for two years from 30 January 2016, and was reappointed for a further two-year term from 14 January 2019. She spent much of her judicial career presiding at one of New Zealand's busiest courts.

In the 2016 Queen's Birthday Honours, McAuslan was appointed a Companion of the Queen's Service Order, for services to the judiciary.

== Death ==
McAuslan died in Edinburgh, Scotland, on 24 May 2019.
