= Archery New Zealand =

Sports governing body in New Zealand

Archery New Zealand Inc. is the national governing body for the sport of Archery in New Zealand as recognised by the World Archery Federation.

== Championships ==
The 2011 indoor championships for Archery New Zealand was held at Arena Manawatu's B & M Centre, with competitions for best compound archer and best recurve (Olympic bow) archer, with the competition divided between women and men, along with a division of ages between masters, seniors, cadet boys, and cub boys.
