= Gary Schofield (artist) =

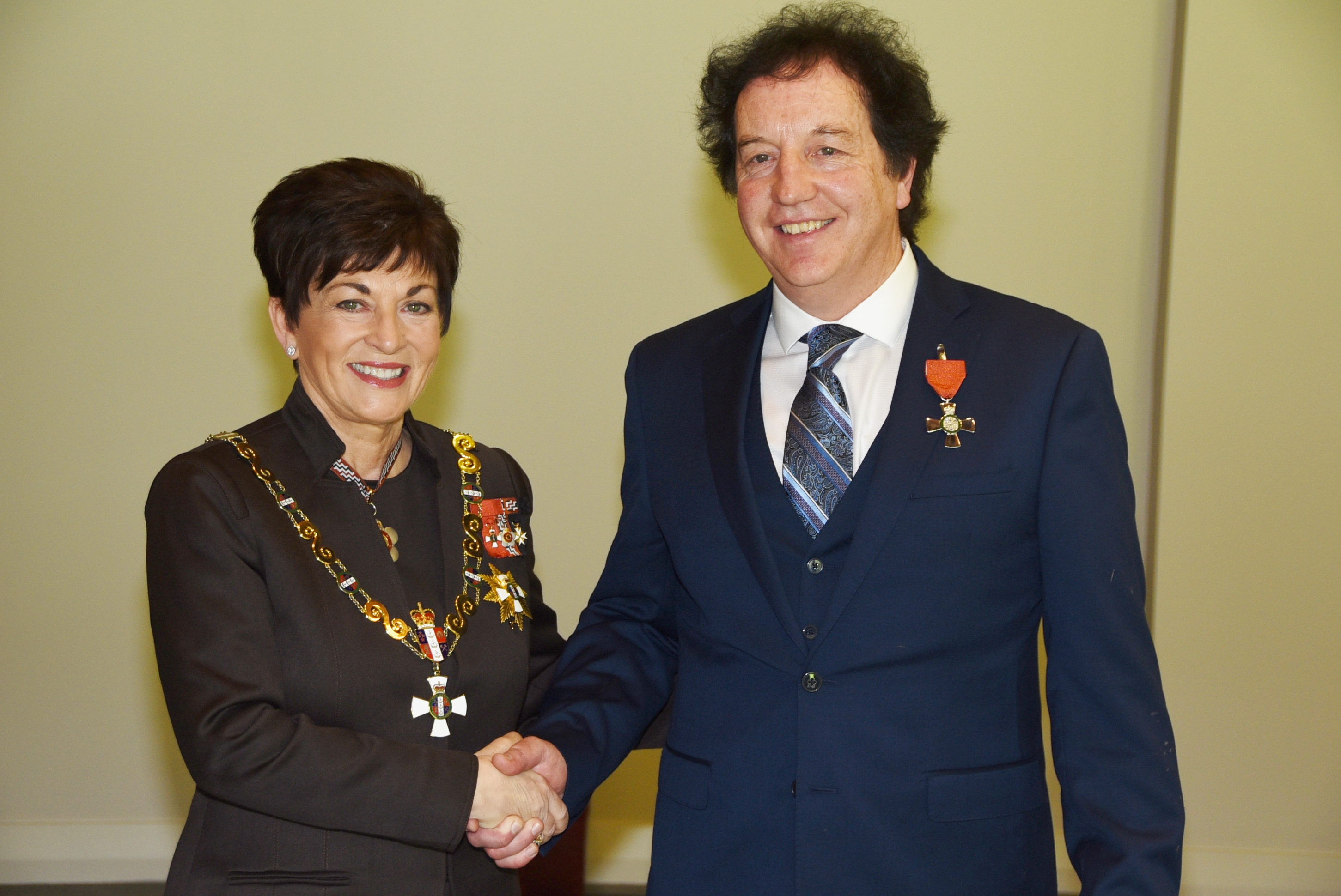
Schofield in 2016, after his investiture as a Member of the New Zealand Order of Merit by the governor-general, Dame Patsy Reddy

Gary Stewart Schofield MNZM is a New Zealand writer, musician, television producer and artist. He is president of Global Concern, Inc. a non-profit organization with practical solutions for global warming.

== Work ==
=== Fine arts ===
The Arlington National Cemetery Painting is the only painting on permanent display in Arlington National Cemetery.

==== Commissioned artworks ====
- The Pentagon’s September 11 painting in 2002
- The Pentagon Full Honors Ceremony'. It hangs in the office of the U.S. Secretary of Defense in The Pentagon.
- The Congressional Medal of Honor Painting. It is on permanent display with the Medal of Honor at the U.S. Army Quartermaster Museum in Fort Lee, Virginia The painting honors the heroism of Medal of Honor winner Private George Watson in World War II.
- A painting of Iwo Jima, chosen for the 50th anniversary image of the Battle of Iwo Jima.
- The New Zealand Chancery, commissioned by John Wood, the former New Zealand Ambassador to the United States.
- The Earth from Space, for Defense Systems and Orbital. The painting hangs at the Thomas Jefferson High School for Science and Technology in Fairfax County, Virginia.

==== Portraits ====
- Charles, Prince of Wales and Diana, Princess of Wales
- Climber Sir Edmund Hillary
- U.S. Secretary of Defense William Perry
- General John Shalikashvili
- New Zealander Jane Arnott

=== Lectures ===
- American veterans at the Veterans Medical Center, Washington, D.C., on September 10, 2004
- Wellington War College, Fort Hunt, VA on May 12, 2015
- Australian veterans at the Australian Embassy, Washington, D.C., in 2007
- Leaders of the US Armed forces in the Secretary of Defense’ office in 1997.
- ANZAC lecture on the World War I Gallipoli Campaign at Georgetown University in 2005

==== Books and other creative works ====
- Iwo Jima and Gallipoli book
- "The Future of War" segment for the book Future Vision in 1996
- The Big Picture, a multimedia production at the New Zealand Embassy, Washington, D.C., on behalf of film producer Roger Donaldson 1994.
- New Dimensions educational television series (producer)
- "Science in American Life" for Fairfax County Public Schools with the Smithsonian Institution, American Chemical Society and the National Science Foundation (writer and co-producer).
- The Child’s World book Welcome to New Zealand 2008 (content advisor)
- Played opposite Tom Hanks and directed by Robert Zemeckis as an American Veteran in Forrest Gump in 1994

==== Honors ====
- Honored at the Hall of Heroes at the Pentagon on August 2, 1996
- Judge for the World Bank Art Award, at the benefit of the AIDS Crisis in July 2003.
- His work has been presented to visitors by Secretaries of Defense William Perry, William Cohen, and Donald Rumsfeld, and by Chairmen of the Joint Chiefs of Staff General Shalikashvili and General Hugh Shelton. His writing and art work are currently being presented by the US Armed Forces Foundation.

=== Music ===
• Musical credits: Composer of the "Orchestral Song of Sequoia" Performed on the Presidential Yacht Sequoia, October 24, 2003.

"Love of Christmas" 2008 released by EVN, Inc. "The Snow is Melting For Christmas" 209 released by EVN, Inc.

• Gary Schofield’s use of the English language features in McGraw Hill’s "English n the Work Place" and "English in Everyday Life" in both the books and DVD production. 2008

== Current activity ==
Returning to New Zealand he completed a degree in Biochemistry and moved to the United States in 1989. He is currently writing educational programs for US students on Grammar and History.

== Honours ==
In the 2016 Queen's Birthday Honours, Schofield was appointed a Member of the New Zealand Order of Merit for services an artist and to New Zealand–United States relations.
