= Living New Zealand dames and knights =

List of living New Zealand holders of a title

The following is a list of living New Zealanders who have been appointed dames or knights.

== Inclusion criteria ==
The list includes:

- Dames and knights of the New Zealand Order of Merit, including
  - Dames or Knights Grand Companion (GNZM)
  - Dames or Knights Companion (KNZM or DNZM)
- Dames and knights of an Order of Chivalry under the British Imperial Honours system, including
  - Order of the British Empire
  - Royal Victorian Order
  - Order of St Michael and St George
  - Order of the Bath
  - Order of the Garter
- Knights Bachelor (no female counterpart)

=== Principal and distinguished companions ===
The list does not include principal companions (PCNZM) and distinguished companions (DCNZM). These non-titular honours were announced by the fifth Labour Government of New Zealand in April 2000. While the appointments were identical in rank to dames or knights grand companion (GNZM), and dames or knights companion (KNZM or DNZM), respectively, they did not provide the appellation of "sir" or "dame". The change was made via royal warrant and came into effect before the 2000 Birthday Honours were announced on 13 June. With the change to the fifth National Government of New Zealand, John Key announced the reinstatement of the titles "sir" or "dame" in March 2009. This further change was made via Royal Warrant and came into effect before the 2009 Birthday Honours were announced on 1 June. There had been eighty-five appointees in the interim who were still alive (seventy eight DCNZM and seven PCNZM; four of the latter already enjoyed a title) and five who had died.

Of the 85 who were eligible to take on a title, 72 chose to do so in 2009. Of the thirteen who elected to remain as principal and distinguished companions, two already held a title (Ivor Richardson and Silvia Cartwright). The first person who had the title bestowed was Heather Begg, who received her damehood in April 2009 ahead of others because of failing health (she died a month later). The remaining seventy-one received their titles through the 2009 Special Honours. Vincent O'Sullivan accepted redesignation from Distinguished Companion to Knight Companion on 10 December 2021. Sam Neill accepted the same redesignation on 9 June 2022.

== List of living dames and knights ==
By default, the table below is sorted in chronological order of appointment as a knight or dame.

Name	Portrait	Honour	Date of appointment	Citation	Present age
Dame Naomi James; DBE		Dame Commander of the Order of the British Empire	30 December 1978	For services to sailing	77
Dame Kiri Te Kanawa; ONZ CH DBE AC		Dame Commander of the Order of the British Empire	12 June 1982	For services to opera	82
Sir George Chapman		Knight Bachelor	12 June 1982	For political and public services	99
Dame Ann Hercus; DCMG		Dame Commander of the Order of St Michael and St George	31 December 1987	For public services	84
Dame Silvia Cartwright; ONZ PCNZM DBE QSO DStJ		Dame Commander of the Order of the British Empire	17 June 1989	For services to women	83
Sir Kerry Burke		Knight Bachelor	30 December 1989	Speaker of the House of Representatives	84
Sir Brian Elwood; CBE JP		Knight Bachelor	30 December 1989	For services to local government	93
Sir Paul Beresford		Knight Bachelor	30 December 1989	For political and public service	80
Sir Richard Hadlee; MBE		Knight Bachelor	16 June 1990	For services to cricket	75
Sir Michael Fay		Knight Bachelor	16 June 1990	For services to merchant banking and yachting	77
Sir Roger Douglas		Knight Bachelor	31 December 1990	For public services	88
Sir Geoffrey Palmer; KCMG AC KC PC		Knight Commander of the Order of St Michael and St George	31 December 1990	Prime Minister of New Zealand 1989–90	84
Dame Malvina Major; ONZ GNZM DBE		Dame Commander of the Order of the British Empire	15 June 1991	For services to opera and the community	83
Dame Malvina Major; ONZ GNZM DBE		Dame Grand Companion of the New Zealand Order of Merit	1 August 2009	For services to opera	83
Dame Norma Restieaux; DBE		Dame Commander of the Order of the British Empire	13 June 1992	For services to cardiology	92
Dame Dawn Lamb; DBE JP		Dame Commander of the Order of the British Empire	12 June 1993	For services to education	86
Sir Tipene O'Regan; ONZ		Knight Bachelor	11 June 1994	For services to the Māori people and the community	87
Sir Somerford Teagle; KBE		Knight Commander of the Order of the British Empire	11 June 1994	Chief of Defence Force	88
Sir Dryden Spring		Knight Bachelor	11 June 1994	For services to the dairy industry	87
Dame Anne Salmond; ONZ DBE		Dame Commander of the Order of the British Empire	31 December 1994	For services to historical research	81
Sir William Southgate		Knight Bachelor	31 December 1994	For services to music	85
Dame Gillian Weir; DBE		Dame Commander of the Order of the British Empire	30 December 1995	For services to music	85
Dame Kate Harcourt; DNZM JP		Dame Companion of the New Zealand Order of Merit	3 June 1996	For services to the theatre	99
Dame Fiona Kidman; DNZM OBE		Dame Companion of the New Zealand Order of Merit	31 December 1997	For services to literature	86
Sir Ron Carter; ONZ KNZM		Knight Companion of the New Zealand Order of Merit	31 December 1997	For services to engineering and business administration	91
Dame Susan Devoy; DNZM CBE		Dame Companion of the New Zealand Order of Merit	1 June 1998	For services to sport and the community	62
Sir Bob Charles; ONZ KNZM CBE		Knight Companion of the New Zealand Order of Merit	31 December 1998	For services to golf	90
Sir Doug Graham; KNZM PC		Knight Companion of the New Zealand Order of Merit	31 December 1998	For services as a Minister of the Crown and Member of Parliament	84
Dame Sian Elias; GNZM KC PC		Dame Grand Companion of the New Zealand Order of Merit	7 June 1999	Chief Justice of New Zealand	77
Dame Margaret Bazley; ONZ DNZM		Dame Companion of the New Zealand Order of Merit	7 June 1999	For public services, lately as Chief Executive of the Department of Social Welfare	88
Sir Gil Simpson; KNZM QSM		Knight Companion of the New Zealand Order of Merit	31 December 1999	For services to information technology, commerce and the community	78
Dame Judith Mayhew; DBE		Dame Commander of the Order of the British Empire	15 June 2002	For services to the City of London	78
Sir Frederick Goodwin; KBE JP		Knight Commander of the Order of the British Empire	11 June 2004	For services to the community	86
Sir Don McKinnon; ONZ GCVO PC		Knight Grand Cross of the Royal Victorian Order	9 March 2009	formerly Commonwealth Secretary-General	87
Sir Anand Satyanand; GNZM QSO KStJ		Knight Grand Companion of the New Zealand Order of Merit	27 March 2009	Governor-General of New Zealand	82
Sir John Walker; KNZM CBE		Knight Companion of the New Zealand Order of Merit	1 June 2009	For services to sport and the community	74
Dame Jenny Gibbs; DNZM		Dame Companion of the New Zealand Order of Merit	1 June 2009	For services to the arts	86
Sir John Goulter; KNZM JP		Knight Companion of the New Zealand Order of Merit	1 August 2009	For services to business and the community	85
Sir John Hansen; KNZM		Knight Companion of the New Zealand Order of Merit	1 August 2009	For services to the judiciary	80–81
Dame Lois Muir; DNZM OBE		Dame Companion of the New Zealand Order of Merit	1 August 2009	For services to sports administration and netball	91
Sir Peter Blanchard; KNZM PC		Knight Companion of the New Zealand Order of Merit	1 August 2009	For services to the judiciary	84
Sir Peter Gluckman; ONZ KNZM		Knight Companion of the New Zealand Order of Merit	1 August 2009	For services to medicine	77
Sir Ralph Norris; KNZM		Knight Companion of the New Zealand Order of Merit	1 August 2009	For services to business	76–77
Sir Stephen Tindall; GNZM		Knight Companion of the New Zealand Order of Merit	1 August 2009	For services to business and the community	75
Sir Stephen Tindall; GNZM		Knight Grand Companion of the New Zealand Order of Merit	31 December 2018	For services to business, the community, and the environment	75
Dame Sukhi Turner; DNZM		Dame Companion of the New Zealand Order of Merit	1 August 2009	For services to local government	74
Dame Linda Holloway; DNZM		Dame Companion of the New Zealand Order of Merit	1 August 2009	For services to medicine	86
Sir John Wells; KNZM		Knight Companion of the New Zealand Order of Merit	1 August 2009	For services to business and sport	83
Sir Ken Stevens; KNZM		Knight Companion of the New Zealand Order of Merit	1 August 2009	For services to exporting	82–83
Dame Margaret Millard; DNZM JP		Dame Companion of the New Zealand Order of Merit	1 August 2009	For services to the rural community	86–87
Sir Henry van der Heyden; KNZM		Knight Companion of the New Zealand Order of Merit	1 August 2009	For services to agriculture	69
Sir Noel Robinson; KNZM		Knight Companion of the New Zealand Order of Merit	1 August 2009	For services to business and the community	82
Sir David Mauger; KNZM		Knight Companion of the New Zealand Order of Merit	1 August 2009	For services to paediatrics	
Sir Alan Mark; KNZM CBE		Knight Companion of the New Zealand Order of Merit	1 August 2009	For services to conservation	94
Sir Peter Maire; KNZM		Knight Companion of the New Zealand Order of Merit	1 August 2009	For services to business	74–75
Sir Patrick Mahony; KNZM		Knight Companion of the New Zealand Order of Merit	1 August 2009	For services to the Family Court	
Sir George Fistonich; KNZM		Knight Companion of the New Zealand Order of Merit	1 August 2009	For services to the wine industry	85–86
Dame Jenny Shipley; DNZM PC		Dame Companion of the New Zealand Order of Merit	1 August 2009	For services as a Member of Parliament	74
Sir Russell Coutts; KNZM CBE		Knight Companion of the New Zealand Order of Merit	1 August 2009	For services to yachting, especially the 2000 America's Cup challenge	64
Dame Lynley Dodd; DNZM		Dame Companion of the New Zealand Order of Merit	1 August 2009	For services to children's literature and book illustration	84–85
Sir Andrew Tipping; KNZM PC		Knight Companion of the New Zealand Order of Merit	1 August 2009	For services as a judge of the Supreme Court and Court of Appeal of New Zealand	84
Sir Bruce Ferguson; KNZM OBE AFC		Knight Companion of the New Zealand Order of Merit	1 August 2009	For services to the New Zealand Defence Force, lately as Chief of Defence Force	77
Dame Claudia Orange; DNZM OBE		Dame Companion of the New Zealand Order of Merit	1 August 2009	For services to historical research	88
Sir David Carruthers; KNZM		Knight Companion of the New Zealand Order of Merit	1 August 2009	For services to the District Court	85–86
Sir David Skegg; KNZM OBE		Knight Companion of the New Zealand Order of Merit	1 August 2009	For services to medicine	78
Sir Doug Kidd; KNZM		Knight Companion of the New Zealand Order of Merit	1 August 2009	For services as Speaker of the House of Representatives, 1996–99	85
Sir Eddie Durie; KNZM		Knight Companion of the New Zealand Order of Merit	1 August 2009	For services to the Māori Land Court, Waitangi Tribunal and High Court of New Zealand	86
Sir Ted Thomas; KNZM KC PC		Knight Companion of the New Zealand Order of Merit	1 August 2009	For services as a judge of the Court of Appeal	91–92
Dame Gillian Whitehead; DNZM		Dame Companion of the New Zealand Order of Merit	1 August 2009	For services to music	85
Dame Margaret Sparrow; DNZM MBE		Dame Companion of the New Zealand Order of Merit	1 August 2009	For services to medicine and the community	91
Dame Robin White; DNZM		Dame Companion of the New Zealand Order of Merit	1 August 2009	For services to painting and printmaking	80
Sir William Young; KNZM KC		Knight Companion of the New Zealand Order of Merit	1 August 2009	For services as president of the Court of Appeal of New Zealand	74
Sir Mason Durie; ONZ KNZM		Knight Companion of the New Zealand Order of Merit	31 December 2009	For services to Māori health, in particular public health services	87
Sir Peter Jackson; ONZ KNZM		Knight Companion of the New Zealand Order of Merit	31 December 2009	For services to film	65
Dame Lesley Max; DNZM MBE		Dame Companion of the New Zealand Order of Merit	31 December 2009	For services to children	81
Sir Bruce Robertson; KNZM KC		Knight Companion of the New Zealand Order of Merit	31 December 2009	For services as a judge of the High Court of New Zealand and the Court of Appeal of New Zealand	82
Sir Hugh Williams; KNZM KC		Knight Companion of the New Zealand Order of Merit	7 June 2010	For services as a judge	87
Sir Peter Leitch; KNZM QSM		Knight Companion of the New Zealand Order of Merit	7 June 2010	For services to business and philanthropy	82
Sir Richard Taylor; KNZM		Knight Companion of the New Zealand Order of Merit	7 June 2010	For services to film	61
Sir Ray Avery; GNZM		Knight Grand Companion of the New Zealand Order of Merit	31 December 2010	For services to philanthropy	78–79
Sir William Gallagher; KNZM MBE		Knight Companion of the New Zealand Order of Merit	31 December 2010	For services to business	85
Dame Alison Holst; DNZM CBE QSM		Dame Companion of the New Zealand Order of Merit	31 December 2010	For services to the food industry	87–88
Sir David Baragwanath; KNZM KC		Knight Companion of the New Zealand Order of Merit	31 December 2010	For services as a judge of the Court of Appeal	86
Sir Jerry Mateparae; GNZM QSO KStJ		Knight Grand Companion of the New Zealand Order of Merit	20 May 2011	Governor-General Designate	72
Sir Graeme Harrison; KNZM		Knight Companion of the New Zealand Order of Merit	6 June 2011	For services to business	78
Sir Pat Higgins; KNZM		Knight Companion of the New Zealand Order of Merit	6 June 2011	For services to philanthropy and the community	88–89
Dame Rosanne Meo; DNZM OBE		Dame Companion of the New Zealand Order of Merit	31 December 2011	For services to business	85–86
Sir Graham Henry; KNZM		Knight Companion of the New Zealand Order of Merit	31 December 2011	For services to rugby	80
Dame Suzie Moncrieff; DNZM		Dame Companion of the New Zealand Order of Merit	31 December 2011	For services to the arts	77–78
Sir Maarten Wevers; KNZM		Knight Companion of the New Zealand Order of Merit	4 June 2012	For services to the State	74
Sir Roderick Deane; KNZM		Knight Companion of the New Zealand Order of Merit	4 June 2012	services to business and the community	85
Dame Pieter Stewart; DNZM		Dame Companion of the New Zealand Order of Merit	4 June 2012	For services to fashion and the community	80
Sir John Kirwan; KNZM MBE		Knight Companion of the New Zealand Order of Merit	4 June 2012	For services to mental health and rugby	61
Dame Beverley Wakem; DNZM CBE		Dame Companion of the New Zealand Order of Merit	4 June 2012	For services to the State	82
Dame Judith Potter; DNZM CBE		Dame Companion of the New Zealand Order of Merit	31 December 2012	For services to the judiciary	84
Sir Mark O'Regan; KNZM		Knight Companion of the New Zealand Order of Merit	31 December 2012	For services to the judiciary	72
Sir Mark Solomon; KNZM		Knight Companion of the New Zealand Order of Merit	31 December 2012	For services to Māori and business	71–72
Sir Owen Glenn; KNZM		Knight Companion of the New Zealand Order of Merit	31 December 2012	For services to philanthropy	86
Sir Mark Todd; KNZM CBE		Knight Companion of the New Zealand Order of Merit	31 December 2012	For services to equestrian sport	70
Sir Bob Harvey; KNZM QSO		Knight Companion of the New Zealand Order of Merit	31 December 2012	For services to local-body affairs and the community	83
Sir Julian Smith; KNZM OBE		Knight Companion of the New Zealand Order of Merit	31 December 2012	For services to business	83
Dame Wendy Pye; DNZM MBE		Dame Companion of the New Zealand Order of Merit	31 December 2012	For services to business and education	82–83
Sir Lockwood Smith; KNZM		Knight Companion of the New Zealand Order of Merit	3 June 2013	For services as a member of Parliament and as speaker of the House of Representatives	78
Sir John Davies; KNZM QSO		Knight Companion of the New Zealand Order of Merit	3 June 2013	For services to business and tourism	85
Sir Gordon Tietjens; KNZM		Knight Companion of the New Zealand Order of Merit	3 June 2013	For services to rugby	70
Sir Malcolm Grant; CBE		Knight Bachelor	15 June 2013	For services to higher education	78
Dame Trelise Cooper; DNZM		Dame Companion of the New Zealand Order of Merit	31 December 2013	For services to fashion and the community	68–69
Dame Alison Paterson; DNZM QSO		Dame Companion of the New Zealand Order of Merit	31 December 2013	For services to business	91
Sir Peter Vela; KNZM		Knight Companion of the New Zealand Order of Merit	31 December 2013	For services to the Thoroughbred industry	76–77
Sir Bob Parker; KNZM		Knight Companion of the New Zealand Order of Merit	31 December 2013	For services to local-body affairs and the community	73
Sir David Moxon; KNZM		Knight Companion of the New Zealand Order of Merit	31 December 2013	For services to the Anglican Church	75
Dame Susan Glazebrook; DNZM		Dame Companion of the New Zealand Order of Merit	2 June 2014	For services to the judiciary	70
Sir Graeme Avery; KNZM		Knight Companion of the New Zealand Order of Merit	2 June 2014	For services to business and sport	85
Sir Robert Stewart; KNZM		Knight Companion of the New Zealand Order of Merit	2 June 2014	For services to manufacturing and the community	85–86
Sir Richard Hayes; KNZM		Knight Companion of the New Zealand Order of Merit	2 June 2014	For services to Search and Rescue and the community	74–75
Dame Lowell Goddard; DNZM KC		Dame Companion of the New Zealand Order of Merit	2 June 2014	For services to the law	77
Dame Patsy Reddy; GNZM CVO QSO DStJ		Dame Companion of the New Zealand Order of Merit	2 June 2014	For services to the arts and business	72
Dame Patsy Reddy; GNZM CVO QSO DStJ		Dame Grand Companion of the New Zealand Order of Merit	27 June 2016	Governor-General Designate	72
Sir Paul Collins; KNZM		Knight Companion of the New Zealand Order of Merit	31 December 2014	For services to sports governance	73
Sir Graham Panckhurst; KNZM KC		Knight Companion of the New Zealand Order of Merit	31 December 2014	For services to the judiciary	80–81
Sir Murray Brennan; GNZM		Knight Grand Companion of the New Zealand Order of Merit	31 December 2014	For services to medicine	86
Dame Adrienne Stewart; DNZM QSM		Dame Companion of the New Zealand Order of Merit	31 December 2014	For services to the arts and business	89–90
Sir Patrick Lynch; KNZM QSO		Knight Companion of the New Zealand Order of Merit	31 December 2014	For services to education	84
Sir Neville Jordan; KNZM		Knight Companion of the New Zealand Order of Merit	31 December 2014	For services to business, science and the community	83
Sir Jim McLay; KNZM QSO		Knight Companion of the New Zealand Order of Merit	1 June 2015	For services to business and the State	81
Sir Peter Talley; KNZM		Knight Companion of the New Zealand Order of Merit	1 June 2015	For services to business and philanthropy	
Sir Pita Sharples; KNZM CBE		Knight Companion of the New Zealand Order of Merit	1 June 2015	For services as a Member of Parliament and to Māori	85
Dame Diane Robertson; DNZM		Dame Companion of the New Zealand Order of Merit	1 June 2015	For services to the community	73
Dame Bronwen Holdsworth; DNZM		Dame Companion of the New Zealand Order of Merit	1 June 2015	For services to business and the arts	83
Dame Therese Walsh; DNZM		Dame Companion of the New Zealand Order of Merit	1 June 2015	For services to sports administration	54–55
Dame Paula Rebstock; DNZM		Dame Companion of the New Zealand Order of Merit	31 December 2015	For services to the State	66
Sir Terence Arnold; KNZM KC		Knight Companion of the New Zealand Order of Merit	31 December 2015	For services to the judiciary	78–79
Dame Jane Campion; DNZM		Dame Companion of the New Zealand Order of Merit	31 December 2015	For services to film	72
Sir David Fagan; KNZM		Knight Companion of the New Zealand Order of Merit	31 December 2015	For services to shearing	64–65
Sir Chris Mace; KNZM		Knight Companion of the New Zealand Order of Merit	6 June 2016	For services to science and education	82–83
Dame Karen Sewell; DNZM QSO		Dame Companion of the New Zealand Order of Merit	6 June 2016	For services to education	81–82
Sir Matiu Te Rei; KNZM		Knight Companion of the New Zealand Order of Merit	6 June 2016	For services to Māori	77–78
Sir Ron Young; KNZM		Knight Companion of the New Zealand Order of Merit	6 June 2016	For services to the judiciary	74–75
Dame Ellen France; DNZM		Dame Companion of the New Zealand Order of Merit	6 June 2016	For services to the judiciary	69–70
Sir Michael Friedlander; KNZM		Knight Companion of the New Zealand Order of Merit	6 June 2016	For services to philanthropy	89–90
Dame Valerie Adams; DNZM		Dame Companion of the New Zealand Order of Merit	31 December 2016	For services to athletics	42
Sir Brian Roche; KNZM		Knight Companion of the New Zealand Order of Merit	31 December 2016	For services to the State and business	70–71
Sir David Williams; KNZM KC		Knight Companion of the New Zealand Order of Merit	31 December 2016	For services to international law and international arbitration	85
Dame Fran Wilde; DNZM QSO JP		Dame Companion of the New Zealand Order of Merit	31 December 2016	For services to the State and the community	78
Sir Richard Faull; KNZM		Knight Companion of the New Zealand Order of Merit	31 December 2016	For services to medical research	81
Dame Georgina Kingi; DNZM QSO		Dame Companion of the New Zealand Order of Merit	31 December 2016	For services to Māori and education	
Dame Julie Christie; DNZM		Dame Companion of the New Zealand Order of Merit	5 June 2017	For services to governance and the television industry	63–64
Sir Tīmoti Kāretu; KNZM QSO		Knight Companion of the New Zealand Order of Merit	5 June 2017	For services to the Māori language	88–89
Sir Michael Jones; KNZM		Knight Companion of the New Zealand Order of Merit	5 June 2017	For services to the Pacific community and youth	61
Sir John Key; GNZM AC		Knight Grand Companion of the New Zealand Order of Merit	5 June 2017	For services to the State	65
Sir Graeme Dingle; KNZM MBE		Knight Companion of the New Zealand Order of Merit	5 June 2017	For services to youth	80
Sir Douglas White; KNZM KC		Knight Companion of the New Zealand Order of Merit	30 December 2017	For services to the judiciary	81
Sir John Clarke; KNZM		Knight Companion of the New Zealand Order of Merit	30 December 2017	For services to Māori and heritage preservation	84
Sir Bryan Williams; KNZM MBE		Knight Companion of the New Zealand Order of Merit	30 December 2017	For services to rugby	76
Dame Annette King; DNZM		Dame Companion of the New Zealand Order of Merit	30 December 2017	For services as a Member of Parliament	79
Dame Georgina te Heuheu; DNZM QSO		Dame Companion of the New Zealand Order of Merit	30 December 2017	For services to the State and Māori	82–83
Dame Denise L'Estrange-Corbet; DNZM		Dame Companion of the New Zealand Order of Merit	30 December 2017	For services to fashion and the community	65–66
Dame Naida Glavish; DNZM JP		Dame Companion of the New Zealand Order of Merit	30 December 2017	For services to Māori and the community	79–80
Sir John Rowles; KNZM OBE		Knight Companion of the New Zealand Order of Merit	4 June 2018	For services to entertainment	79
Dame Winnie Laban; DNZM QSO		Dame Companion of the New Zealand Order of Merit	4 June 2018	For services to education and the Pacific community	71
Sir Bill English; KNZM		Knight Companion of the New Zealand Order of Merit	4 June 2018	For services to the State	64
Dame Catherine Healy; DNZM		Dame Companion of the New Zealand Order of Merit	4 June 2018	For services to the rights of sex workers	70–71
Dame Lynda Topp; DNZM		Dame Companion of the New Zealand Order of Merit	4 June 2018	For services to entertainment	68
Dame Charmian O'Connor; DNZM CBE JP		Dame Companion of the New Zealand Order of Merit	4 June 2018	For services to education and chemistry	89
Sir Tom Marsters; KBE		Knight Commander of the Order of the British Empire	9 June 2018	For services to the public and to the community	81
Dame Diana Crossan; DNZM		Dame Companion of the New Zealand Order of Merit	31 December 2018	For services to the State	76–77
Sir Kim Workman; KNZM QSO		Knight Companion of the New Zealand Order of Merit	31 December 2018	For services to prisoner welfare and the justice sector	85–86
Sir Rob McLeod; KNZM		Knight Companion of the New Zealand Order of Merit	31 December 2018	For services to business and Māori	68–69
Dame Kerry Prendergast; DNZM JP		Dame Companion of the New Zealand Order of Merit	31 December 2018	For services to governance and the community	73
Dame Gaylene Preston; DNZM		Dame Companion of the New Zealand Order of Merit	31 December 2018	For services to film	79
Dame Margaret Brimble; DNZM		Dame Companion of the New Zealand Order of Merit	31 December 2018	For services to science	65
Dame Helen Winkelmann; GNZM		Dame Grand Companion of the New Zealand Order of Merit	4 March 2019	Chief Justice Designate	63–64
Sir Roger Hall; KNZM QSO		Knight Companion of the New Zealand Order of Merit	3 June 2019	For services to theatre	87
Dame Sue Bagshaw; DNZM		Dame Companion of the New Zealand Order of Merit	3 June 2019	For services to youth health	77
Sir Paul Adams; KNZM		Knight Companion of the New Zealand Order of Merit	3 June 2019	For services to philanthropy and the community	77–78
Dame Areta Koopu; DNZM CBE		Dame Companion of the New Zealand Order of Merit	3 June 2019	For services to Māori and the community	85
Dame Fran Walsh; DNZM		Dame Companion of the New Zealand Order of Merit	3 June 2019	For services to film	67
Sir Graham Lowe; KNZM QSM		Knight Companion of the New Zealand Order of Merit	3 June 2019	For services to youth and education	80
Dame Noeline Taurua; DNZM		Dame Companion of the New Zealand Order of Merit	31 December 2019	For services to netball	58
Sir Joe Williams; KNZM		Knight Companion of the New Zealand Order of Merit	31 December 2019	For services to the judiciary	64–65
Dame Anna Crighton; DNZM QSO JP		Dame Companion of the New Zealand Order of Merit	31 December 2019	For services to heritage preservation and governance	82
Dame Marilyn Waring; DNZM		Dame Companion of the New Zealand Order of Merit	31 December 2019	For services to women and economics	74
Sir Steve Hansen; KNZM		Knight Companion of the New Zealand Order of Merit	31 December 2019	For services to rugby	67
Sir Derek Lardelli; KNZM		Knight Companion of the New Zealand Order of Merit	1 June 2020	For services to Māori art	64–65
Dame Jane Harding; DNZM		Dame Companion of the New Zealand Order of Merit	1 June 2020	For services to neonatology and perinatology	70–71
Dame Juliet Gerrard; DNZM		Dame Companion of the New Zealand Order of Merit	31 December 2020	For services to science	58–59
Dame Cindy Kiro; GNZM QSO DStJ		Dame Companion of the New Zealand Order of Merit	31 December 2020	For services to child wellbeing and education	67–68
Dame Cindy Kiro; GNZM QSO DStJ		Dame Grand Companion of the New Zealand Order of Merit	9 August 2021	Governor-General Designate	67–68
Sir David Carter; KNZM		Knight Companion of the New Zealand Order of Merit	31 December 2020	For services as a Member of Parliament and as Speaker of the House of Representatives	74
Sir Dave Dobbyn; KNZM		Knight Companion of the New Zealand Order of Merit	31 December 2020	For services to music	69
Sir Ian Taylor; KNZM		Knight Companion of the New Zealand Order of Merit	31 December 2020	For services to broadcasting, business and the community	76–77
Dame Carolyn Burns; DNZM CBE		Dame Companion of the New Zealand Order of Merit	7 June 2021	For services to ecological research	84
Dame Judy Kilpatrick; DNZM		Dame Companion of the New Zealand Order of Merit	7 June 2021	For services to nursing education	76–77
Dame Hinewehi Mohi; DNZM		Dame Companion of the New Zealand Order of Merit	7 June 2021	For services to Māori, music and television	61–62
Dame Ruia Morrison; DNZM MBE		Dame Companion of the New Zealand Order of Merit	7 June 2021	For services to tennis	90
Sir Michael Daniell; KNZM		Knight Companion of the New Zealand Order of Merit	7 June 2021	For services to business, healthcare and governance	69–70
Sir Bill Denny; KNZM		Knight Companion of the New Zealand Order of Merit	7 June 2021	For services to medical research	83
Sir Wayne Shelford; KNZM MBE		Knight Companion of the New Zealand Order of Merit	7 June 2021	For services to rugby and the community	68
Sir Grahame Sydney; KNZM		Knight Companion of the New Zealand Order of Merit	7 June 2021	For services to art	77–78
Dame Lisa Carrington; DNZM		Dame Companion of the New Zealand Order of Merit	31 December 2021	For services to canoe racing	37
Dame Sophie Pascoe; DNZM		Dame Companion of the New Zealand Order of Merit	31 December 2021	For services to swimming	33
Dame Marie Shroff; DNZM CVO		Dame Companion of the New Zealand Order of Merit	31 December 2021	For services to the State and the community	81–82
Sir Chris Farrelly; KNZM		Knight Companion of the New Zealand Order of Merit	31 December 2021	For services to health and the community	74–75
Sir Jim Mann; KNZM		Knight Companion of the New Zealand Order of Merit	31 December 2021	For services to health	82
Dame Ruth Aitken; DNZM		Dame Companion of the New Zealand Order of Merit	6 June 2022	For services to netball	70
Dame Carolyn Henwood; DNZM		Dame Companion of the New Zealand Order of Merit	6 June 2022	For services to the State, youth and the arts	80
Dame Judy McGregor; DNZM		Dame Companion of the New Zealand Order of Merit	6 June 2022	For services to human rights and health	77–78
Sir Hugh Rennie; KNZM CBE KC		Knight Companion of the New Zealand Order of Merit	6 June 2022	For services to governance, the law, business and the community	81
Sir Collin Tukuitonga; KNZM		Knight Companion of the New Zealand Order of Merit	6 June 2022	For services to Pacific and public health	68–69
Dame Miranda Harcourt; DNZM		Dame Companion of the New Zealand Order of Merit	31 December 2022	For services to the screen industry and theatre	63–64
Dame Farah Palmer; DNZM		Dame Companion of the New Zealand Order of Merit	31 December 2022	For services to sport, particularly rugby	53
Dame Jan Wright; DNZM		Dame Companion of the New Zealand Order of Merit	31 December 2022	For services to the state and the environment	
Sir Ashley Bloomfield; KNZM		Knight Companion of the New Zealand Order of Merit	31 December 2022	For services to public health	60–61
Sir Mark Dunajtschik; KNZM		Knight Companion of the New Zealand Order of Merit	31 December 2022	For services to philanthropy	90–91
Sir Haare Williams; KNZM JP		Knight Companion of the New Zealand Order of Merit	31 December 2022	For services to Māori, literature and education	91–92
Dame Julie Maxton; DBE		Dame Commander of the Order of the British Empire	31 December 2022	For services to science and to the law	71
Dame Jacinda Ardern; GNZM		Dame Grand Companion of the New Zealand Order of Merit	5 June 2023	For services to the State	46
Dame Jo Brosnahan; DNZM QSO		Dame Companion of the New Zealand Order of Merit	5 June 2023	For services to governance and business	
Dame Teuila Percival; DNZM QSO		Dame Companion of the New Zealand Order of Merit	5 June 2023	For services to health and the Pacific community	
Sir Stephen Kós; KNZM KC		Knight Companion of the New Zealand Order of Merit	5 June 2023	For services to the judiciary and legal education	67
Sir Selwyn Parata; KNZM		Knight Companion of the New Zealand Order of Merit	5 June 2023	For services to Māori	69–70
Sir Wayne Smith; KNZM		Knight Companion of the New Zealand Order of Merit	5 June 2023	For services to rugby	69
Sir Crawford Falconer; KCMG		Knight Commander of the Order of St Michael and St George	29 December 2023	For services to international trade	71–72
Dame Sarai Bareman; DNZM		Dame Companion of the New Zealand Order of Merit	30 December 2023	For services to football governance	45–46
Dame Pania Tyson-Nathan; DNZM JP		Dame Companion of the New Zealand Order of Merit	30 December 2023	For services to Māori and business	
Sir Scott Macfarlane; KNZM		Knight Companion of the New Zealand Order of Merit	30 December 2023	For services to health	
Sir Trevor Mallard; KNZM		Knight Companion of the New Zealand Order of Merit	30 December 2023	For services as a member of Parliament and as Speaker of the House of Representatives	72
Sir Ian Mune; KNZM OBE		Knight Companion of the New Zealand Order of Merit	30 December 2023	For services to film, television and theatre	84–85
Dame Theresa Gattung; DNZM		Dame Companion of the New Zealand Order of Merit	3 June 2024	For services to women, governance and philanthropy	63–64
Dame Joan Withers; DNZM		Dame Companion of the New Zealand Order of Merit	3 June 2024	For services to business, governance and women	72–73
Sir Peter Beck; KNZM		Knight Companion of the New Zealand Order of Merit	3 June 2024	For services to the aerospace industry, business and education	49–50
Sir Peter Hunter; KNZM		Knight Companion of the New Zealand Order of Merit	3 June 2024	For services to medical science	78
Dame Julie Chapman; DNZM		Dame Companion of the New Zealand Order of Merit	31 December 2024	For services to children and the community	54–55
Dame Ingrid Collins; DNZM		Dame Companion of the New Zealand Order of Merit	31 December 2024	For services to Māori, business and health governance	80–81
Dame Lydia Ko; DNZM		Dame Companion of the New Zealand Order of Merit	31 December 2024	For services to golf	29
Sir John Gallagher; KNZM KStJ		Knight Companion of the New Zealand Order of Merit	31 December 2024	For services to business, education, philanthropy and the community	86–87
Sir Ted Manson; KNZM		Knight Companion of the New Zealand Order of Merit	31 December 2024	For services to philanthropy, the community and business	72
Sir Peter Skelton; KNZM		Knight Companion of the New Zealand Order of Merit	31 December 2024	For services to environmental law	87
Dame Ranjna Patel; DNZM QSM JP		Dame Companion of the New Zealand Order of Merit	2 June 2025	For services to ethnic communities, health and family violence prevention	
Dame Alison Stewart; DNZM		Dame Companion of the New Zealand Order of Merit	2 June 2025	For services to plant science and the arable sector	68–69
Dame Catriona Williams; DNZM		Dame Companion of the New Zealand Order of Merit	2 June 2025	For services to spinal cord injury research and equestrian sport	55–56
Sir Mark Cooper; KNZM KC		Knight Companion of the New Zealand Order of Merit	2 June 2025	For services to the judiciary	
Sir Brendan Lindsay; KNZM		Knight Companion of the New Zealand Order of Merit	2 June 2025	For services to business and philanthropy	
Sir Ewan Smith; KNZM		Knight Companion of the New Zealand Order of Merit	2 June 2025	For services to Cook Islands business and tourism	75
Sir Trevor Clarke; KBE		Knight Commander of the Order of the British Empire	14 June 2025	For services to Cook Islands business and tourism	83–84
Dame Helen Danesh-Meyer; DNZM		Dame Companion of the New Zealand Order of Merit	31 December 2025	For services to ophthalmology	58–59
Dame Coral Shaw; DNZM		Dame Companion of the New Zealand Order of Merit	31 December 2025	For services to public service, the judiciary and the community	78–79
Dame Dorothy Spotswood; DNZM		Dame Companion of the New Zealand Order of Merit	31 December 2025	For services to philanthropy	88–89
Sir Scott Dixon; KNZM		Knight Companion of the New Zealand Order of Merit	31 December 2025	For services to motorsport	46
Sir Rod Drury; KNZM		Knight Companion of the New Zealand Order of Merit	31 December 2025	For services to business, the technology industry and philanthropy	59–60
Sir Graham Le Gros; KNZM		Knight Companion of the New Zealand Order of Merit	31 December 2025	For services to medical science	69–70
Sir Chris Parkin; KNZM		Knight Companion of the New Zealand Order of Merit	31 December 2025	For services to philanthropy and the arts	77–78
Dame Susan Hassall; DNZM JP		Dame Companion of the New Zealand Order of Merit	1 June 2026	For services to education	71–72
Dame Elizabeth Rata; DNZM		Dame Companion of the New Zealand Order of Merit	1 June 2026	For services to education	74
Sir Paul Baker; KNZM		Knight Companion of the New Zealand Order of Merit	1 June 2026	For services to health	
Sir Peter Boshier; KNZM		Knight Companion of the New Zealand Order of Merit	1 June 2026	For services to the State and the judiciary	74
Sir James Chapman; KNZM		Knight Companion of the New Zealand Order of Merit	1 June 2026	For services to literacy education	77–78
Sir David Ellis; KNZM		Knight Companion of the New Zealand Order of Merit	1 June 2026	For services to the Thoroughbred industry and philanthropy	

== See also ==
- Living Australian knights and dames
