= 2005 Birthday Honours (New Zealand) =

Awards list for New Zealand

2005 Queen's Birthday Honours
- Previous: 2005 bravery awards Next: 2006 New Year Honours
- Type: New Zealand royal honours: New Zealand Order of Merit; Queen's Service Order; Queen's Service Medal
- Date: 6 June 2005
- Country: New Zealand

Highlights
- Total recipients: 177

The 2005 Queen's Birthday Honours in New Zealand, celebrating the official birthday of Queen Elizabeth II, were appointments made by the Queen in her right as Queen of New Zealand, on the advice of the New Zealand government, to various orders and honours to reward and highlight good works by New Zealanders. They were announced on 6 June 2005.

The recipients of honours are listed here as they were styled before their new honour.

== New Zealand Order of Merit ==
=== Distinguished Companion (DCNZM) ===
- Chief District Court Judge David James Carruthers – of Paraparaumu. For services to the District Court.
- Cassia Joy Cowley OBE – of Wellington. For services to children's literature.
- George Vjeceslav Fistonich – of Auckland. For services to the wine industry.
- Professor Linda Jane Holloway ONZM – of Dunedin. For services to medicine.
- Judge Anand Satyanand – of Wellington. For public services, lately as an ombudsman.
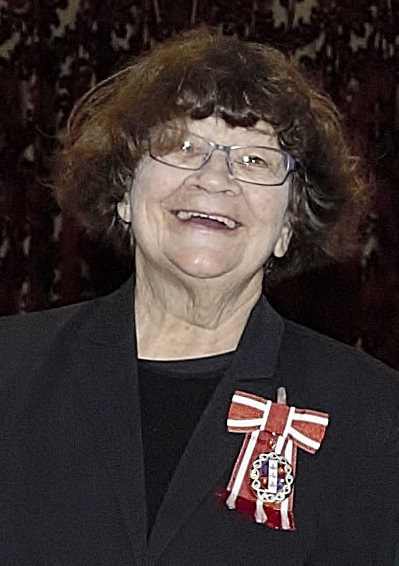
Joy Cowley

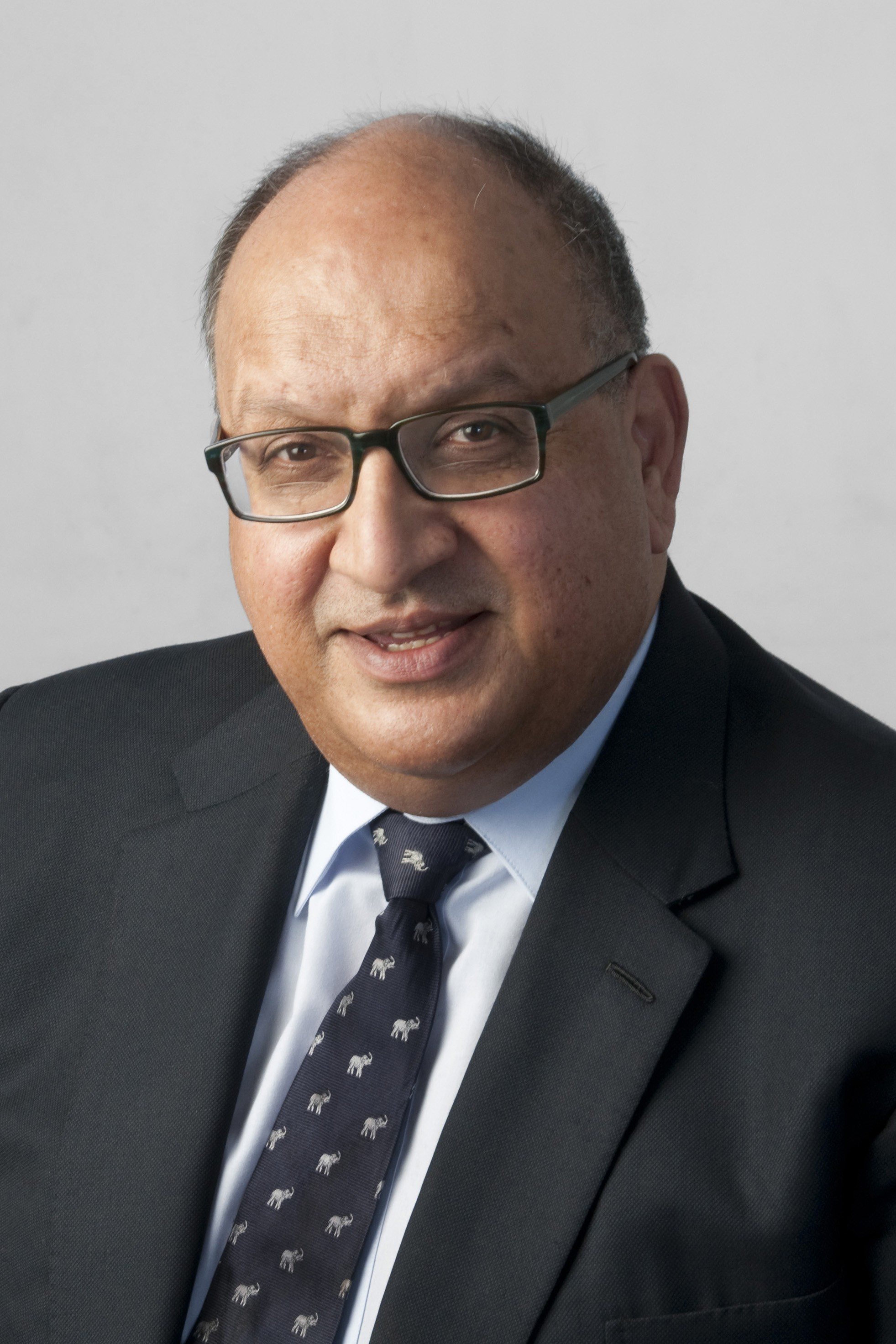
Anand Satyanand

=== Companion (CNZM) ===
- Roger Anthony Bonifant – of Ashburton. For services to business and the public sector.
- Professor Emeritus Frederic Morris Brookfield – of Auckland. For services to education and the law.
- Shona Elizabeth Butterfield QSO – of Wellington. For services to education.
- Te Aue Takotoroa Davis OBE JP – of Manukau City. For services to New Zealand's heritage.
- The Right Honourable Paul Clayton East QC – of Rotorua. For services to Parliament and the law.
- Bryan Charles Gould – of England (lately of Ōpōtiki). For services to tertiary education.
- Professor John Gordon Hunt – of Auckland. For services to architecture.
- Professor Peter Bruce Innes – of Dunedin. For services to dentistry.
- Te Aopehi Kara JP – of Napier. For services to Māori.
- Professor William Manhire – of Wellington. For services to literature.
- Patricia Frances McKelvey MBE – of Waikanae. For services to education.
- Phillippe Patrick O'Shea LVO – of Wellington; New Zealand Herald Arms Extraordinary. For services to the institution and development of the New Zealand honours system.
- The Honourable Barry John Paterson OBE QC – of Auckland. For services to the judiciary.
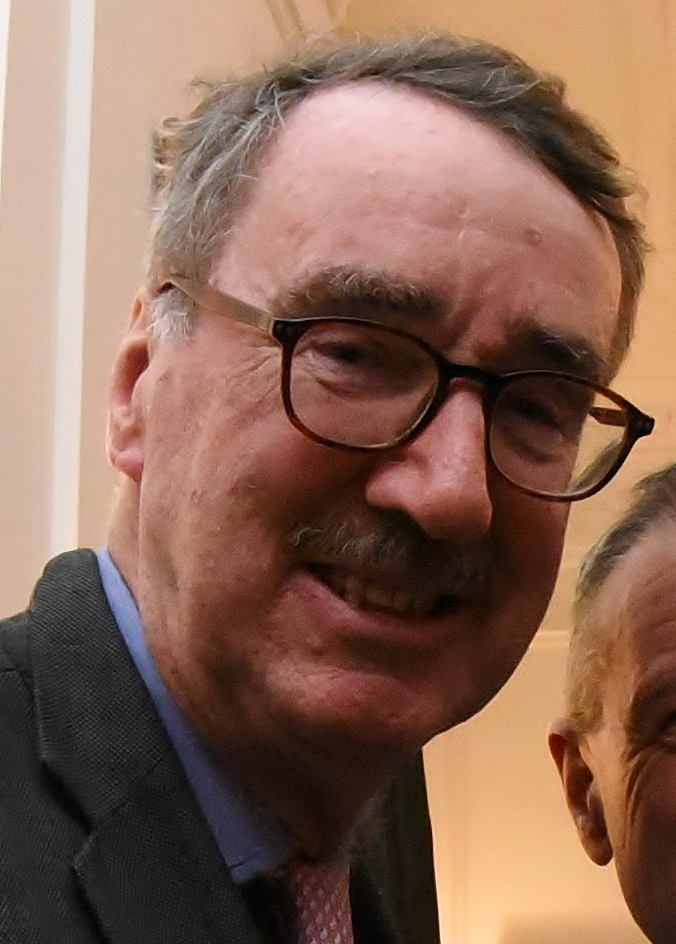
Paul East

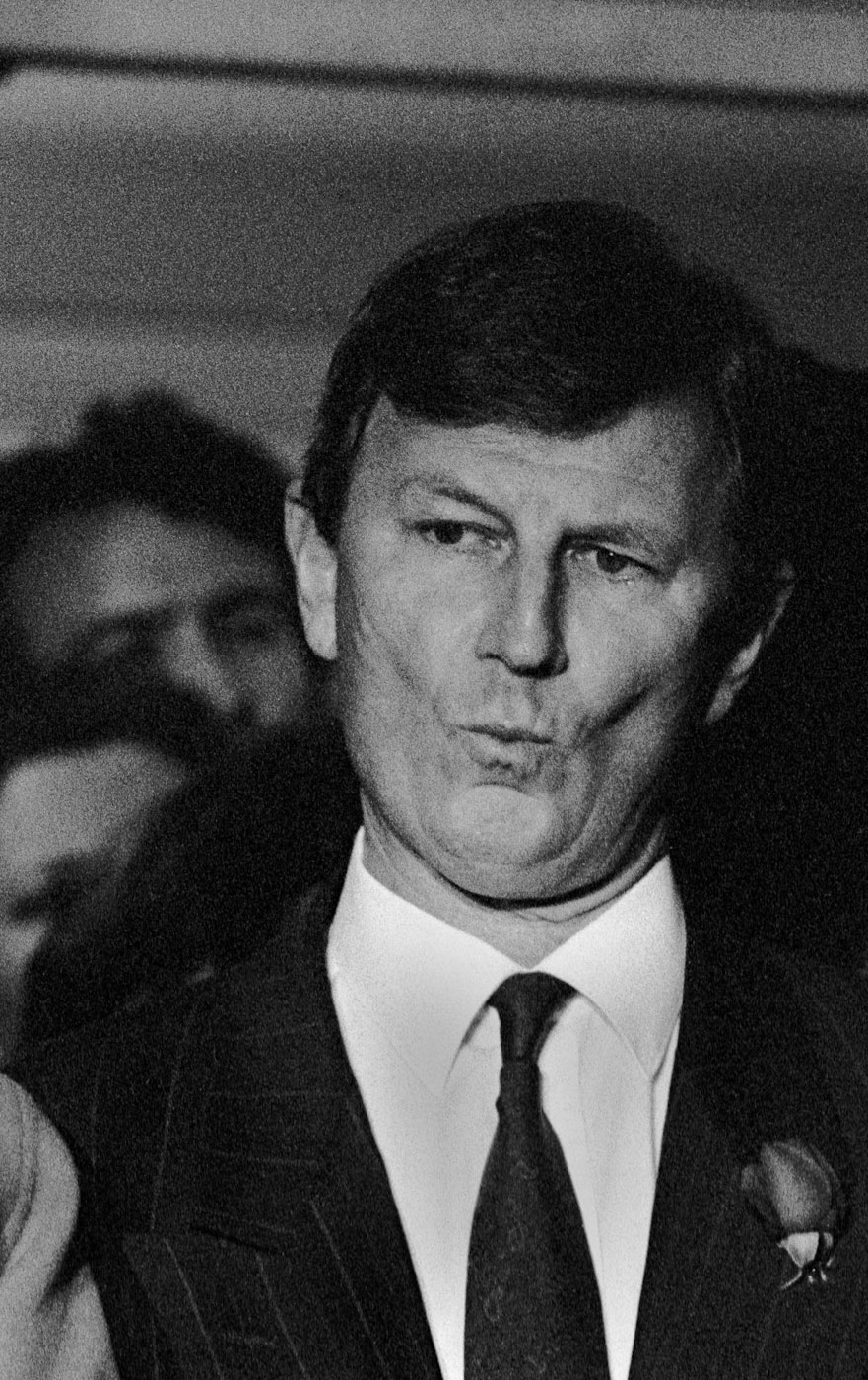
Bryan Gould

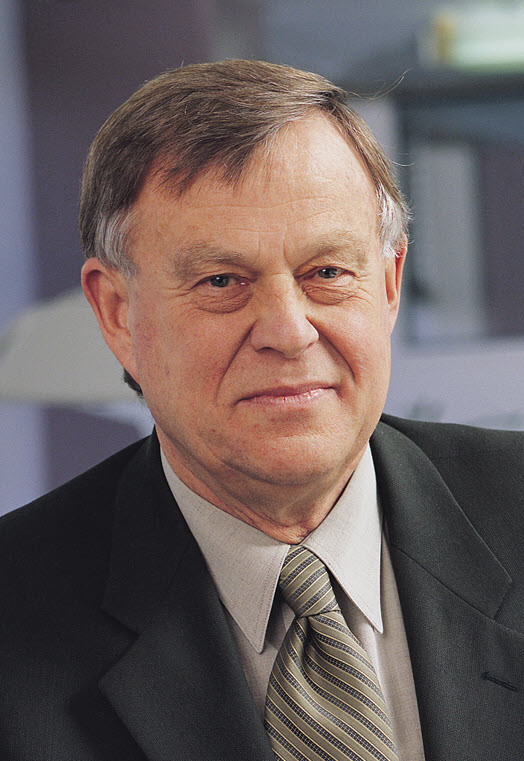
Peter Innes

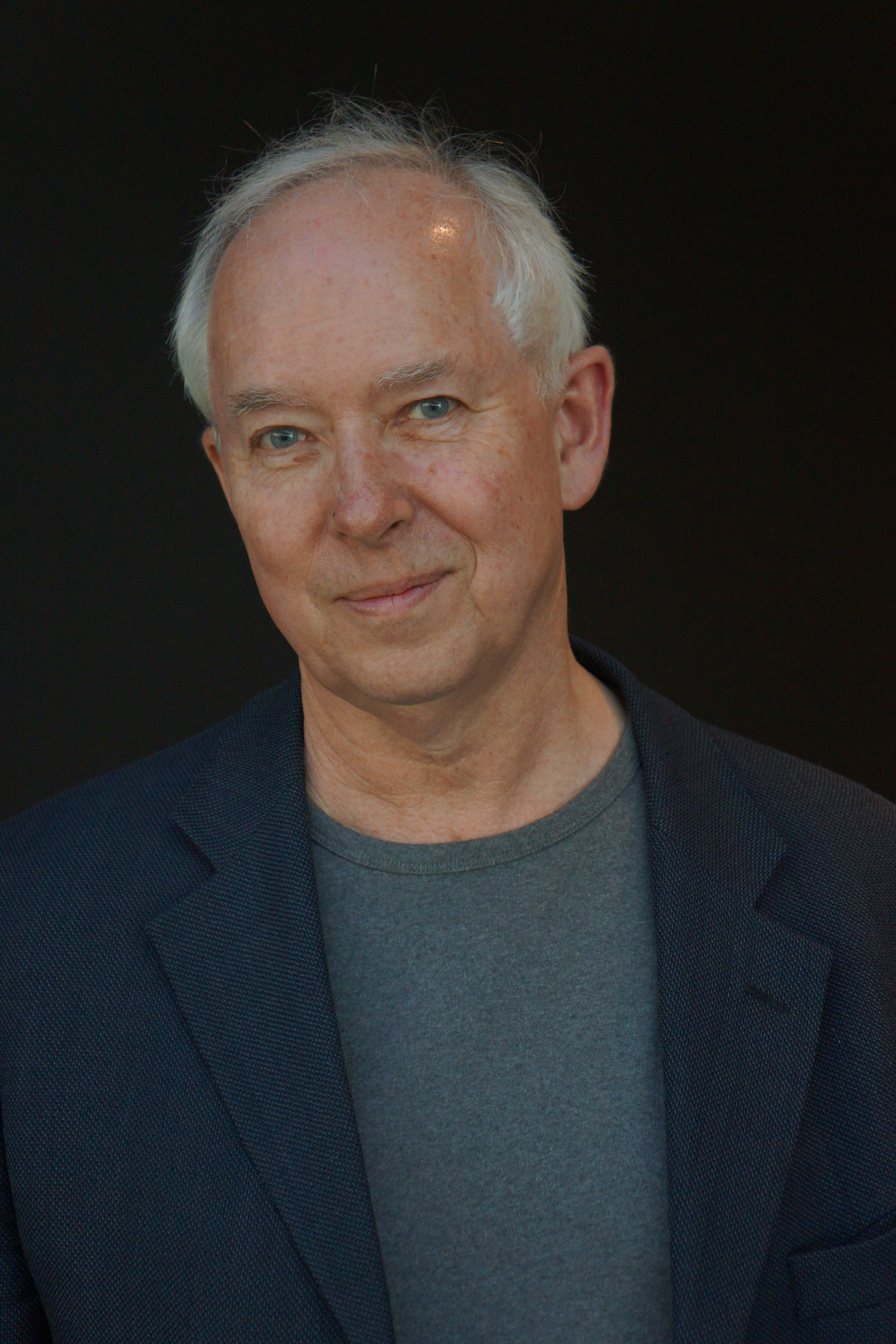
Bill Manhire

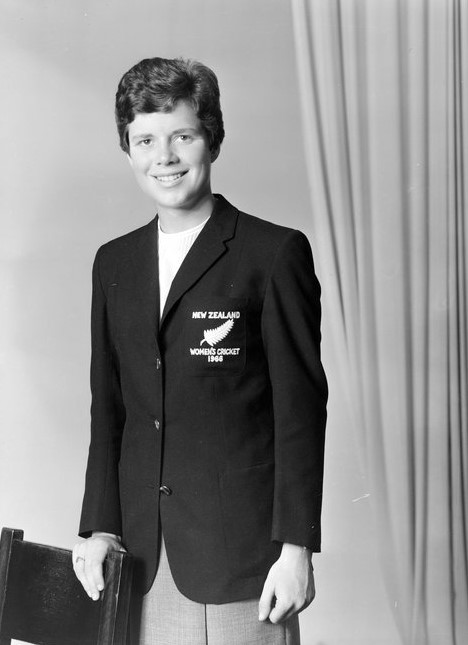
Trish McKelvey

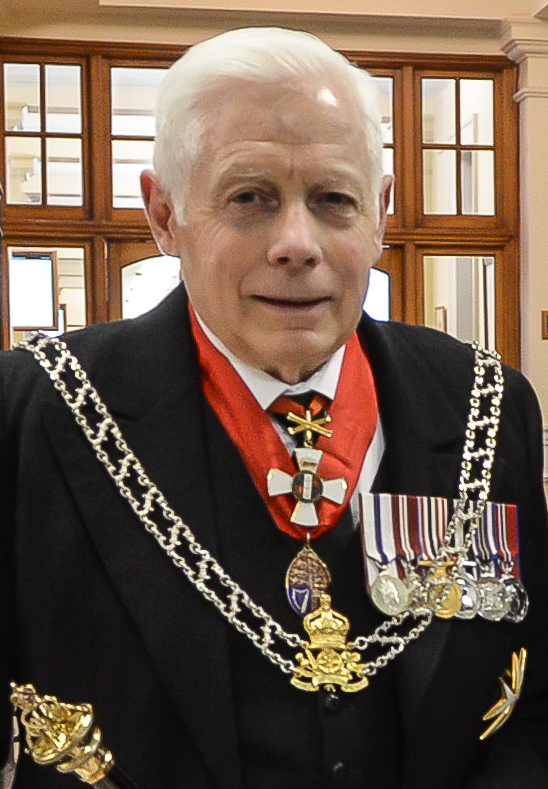
Phillip O'Shea

=== Officer (ONZM) ===
- Dr Michael Anthony Hugh Baird – of Auckland. For services to health and medical administration.
- Christopher Lance Cairns – of Christchurch. For services to cricket.
- Philip Edmund Dadson – of North Shore City. For services to the arts.
- Professor Charles Hines Daugherty – of Wellington. For services to conservation and biology.
- Professor Richard Lewis Maxwell Faull – of Auckland. For services to medical research.
- Beatrice Roini Faumuina – of Waitakere (West Auckland). For services to athletics.
- Daniel Patrick Higgins – of Palmerston North. For services to business and the community.
- Professor Frances Anne Hughes – of Wellington. For services to the mental health profession.
- Michael Eric Hurst – of Auckland. For services to film and the theatre.
- Brigadier David Victor Le Page – Brigadiers' List, New Zealand Army.
- Edward John McCoy – of Dunedin. For services to architecture and architectural heritage.
- Patric Denis O'Brien – of Invercargill. For services to rugby as a referee.
- Ian Laurence Robb – of Westland. For services to the dairy industry.
- Helena Jeannette Schamroth – of North Shore City. For services to the arts.
- Suzanne Lee Snively – of Wellington. For services to business.
- Dr Alexander James Sutherland – of Christchurch. For services to tertiary education and engineering.
- William Russell Sykes – of Christchurch. For services to botany.
- Paul Henry Drury van Asch – of Wakatipu. For services to tourism.
- Geoffrey Alan Walker – of Auckland. For services to literary publishing.
- Vyvyan Yendoll – of Wellington. For services to orchestral music.

Additional

- Major Roger George Margetts – Royal New Zealand Infantry Regiment.
- Major Stephen Andrew Taylor – New Zealand Intelligence Corps.
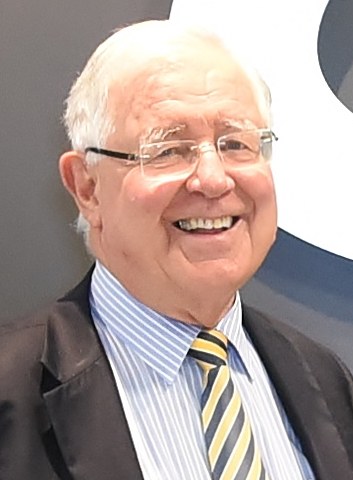
Richard Faull

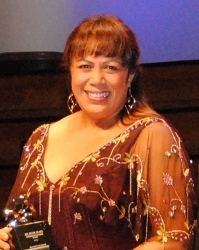
Beatrice Faumuina

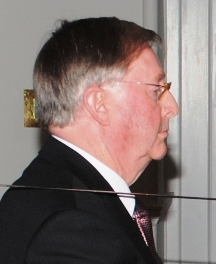
Pat Higgins

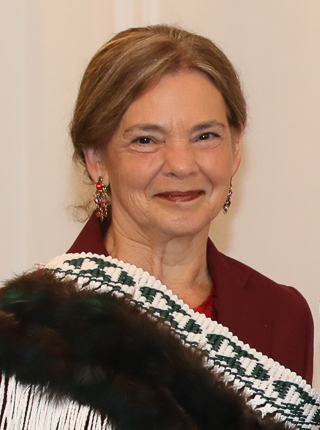
Suzanne Snively

=== Member (MNZM) ===
- Anthony Russell Abell – of Rangiora. For services to the harness racing industry.
- Robert Brian Armstrong JP – of Hamilton. For services to the community.
- Clifford Raymond Barnett – of Auckland. For services to fire safety engineering.
- Charles Leslie Batcheler – of Christchurch. For services to the environment.
- Kenneth Colster Blackburn – of Kapiti Coast. For services to the performing arts.
- Alun Robert Bollinger – of Westland. For services to cinematography.
- Ian James Brodie – of Cromwell. For services to tourism.
- Lynette Isabel Burns – of Hastings. For services to smokefree education and health.
- Elizabeth Palmer Caffin – of North Shore City. For services to literature.
- Douglas John Callander – of Wellington. For services to special education and war veterans.
- Norman Edwin Coop – of Manukau City. For services to athletics.
- Ashokbhai Bhagwandas Darji JP – of Waitakere City. For services to the Indian community.
- Helen Duncan – of Auckland. For public services.
- Barbara Helen Else – of Dunedin. For services to literature.
- Suzanne Hall – of Northland. For services to business.
- Wharekura Hornfeck – of Rotorua. For services to Māori.
- Allan Douglas Hunter – of Christchurch. For services to education and the community.
- Ellen Woods (Eileen) Imlach JP – of Wellington. For services to the community.
- Emeritus Professor Robert Dudley Jolly – of Palmerston North. For services to veterinary science.
- Kevin Gerrard Kneebone – of Pukekohe; sergeant, New Zealand Police. For services to the New Zealand Police.
- Dr Danny Alan Knudson – of Dunedin. For services to education.
- Dr Paul Christopher (Chris) Lane – of Paraparaumu. For services to the community.
- Justin Warren Marshall – of Christchurch. For services to rugby.
- Graham Leonard McBride – of Hamilton. For services to agriculture.
- Keith Albert McEwen – of Upper Hutt. For services to sports broadcasting.
- Carol Lillian Mollard – of Manukau City. For services to education.
- Warrant Officer Class One Murray Royce Nelson – Royal New Zealand Infantry Regiment.
- David John Ogilvie – of Motueka. For services to local body and community affairs.
- Anthony Hugh O'Neill – of Invercargill; inspector, New Zealand Police. For services to the New Zealand Police.
- Anna Mary Richards – of Auckland. For services to women's rugby.
- Janet Mary Riemenschneider-Kemp – of North Shore City. For services to literature.
- Bruce Graham (George) Rogers – of Whakatāne. For services to touch rugby.
- Leicester Bryan Saul – of Blenheim. For services to rowing.
- Peter Godfrey Scott Sergel – of Hamilton. For services to landscape design and the community.
- Dr David William Shaw – of Tauranga. For services to medicine.
- Caroline Sarah Ann Sills – of North Shore City. For services to the fashion industry.
- Anne Therese (Terry) Spragg – of North Shore City. For services to the performing arts.
- Charles William Newman Stanton – of Nelson. For services to motor racing.
- Marie Stechman – of Manukau City. For services to gymnastics.
- Dr Donald Charles Stewart – of Palmerston North. For services to the New Zealand Defence Force as a medical officer.
- Joy Ellen Thompson – of Christchurch. For services to the visually impaired.
- Agnes Anne Thorpe JP – of Ōtaki. For services to the community.
- Peter Watts – of Manukau City. For services to choral music.
- Harvey Wu – of Wellington. For services to the Chinese community.
- Richard Allen (Sandy) Yarndley – of Te Awamutu. For services to the harness racing industry.

Additional

- Leading Marine Technician (Electrical) Matthew David Overton – Royal New Zealand Navy.
- Commander David John Toms – Royal New Zealand Navy.

Honorary

- Susumu Akito Naito – of Japan. For services to New Zealand–Japan relations.
- Toshio Nakamoto – of Japan. For services to New Zealand–Japan relations.
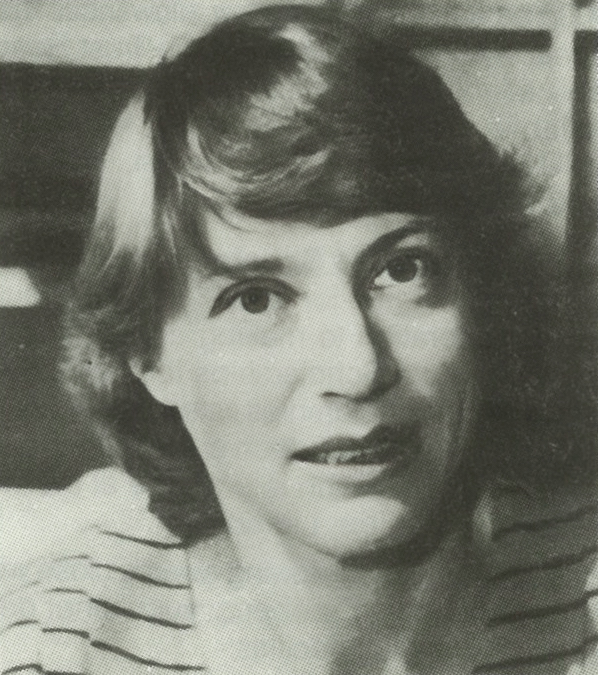
Elizabeth Caffin

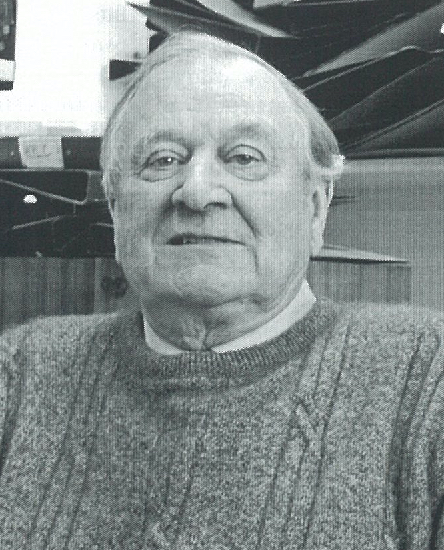
Bob Jolly

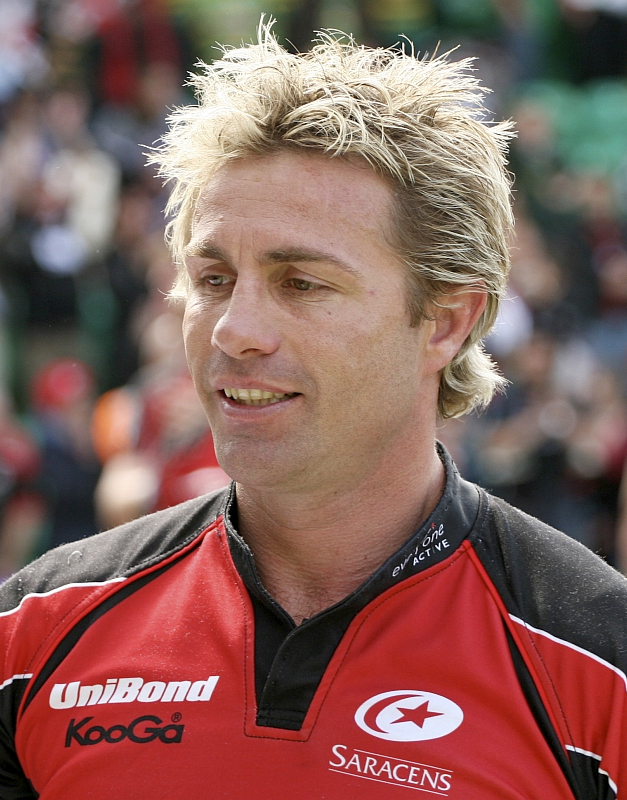
Justin Marshall

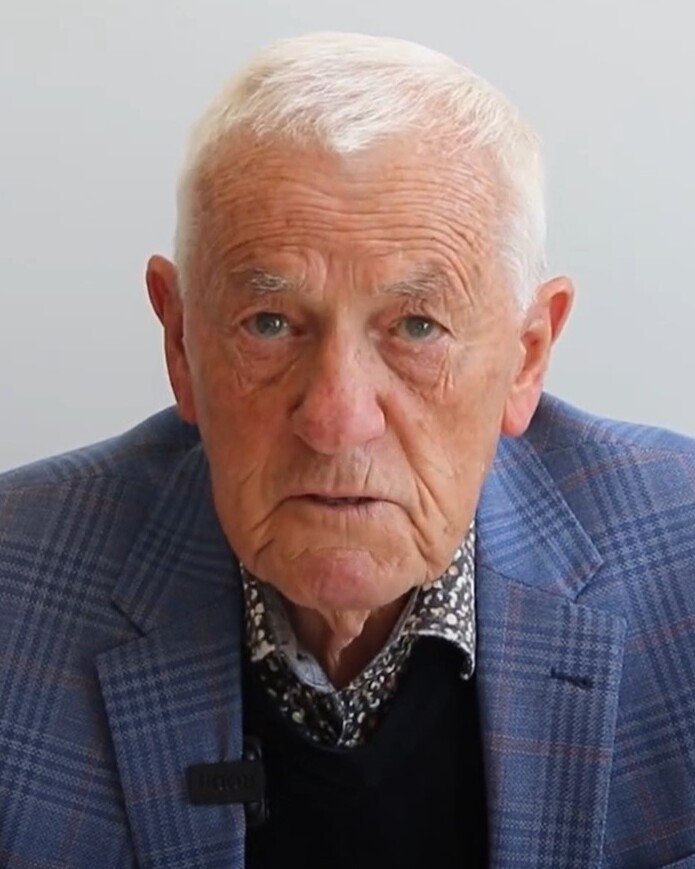
David Ogilvie

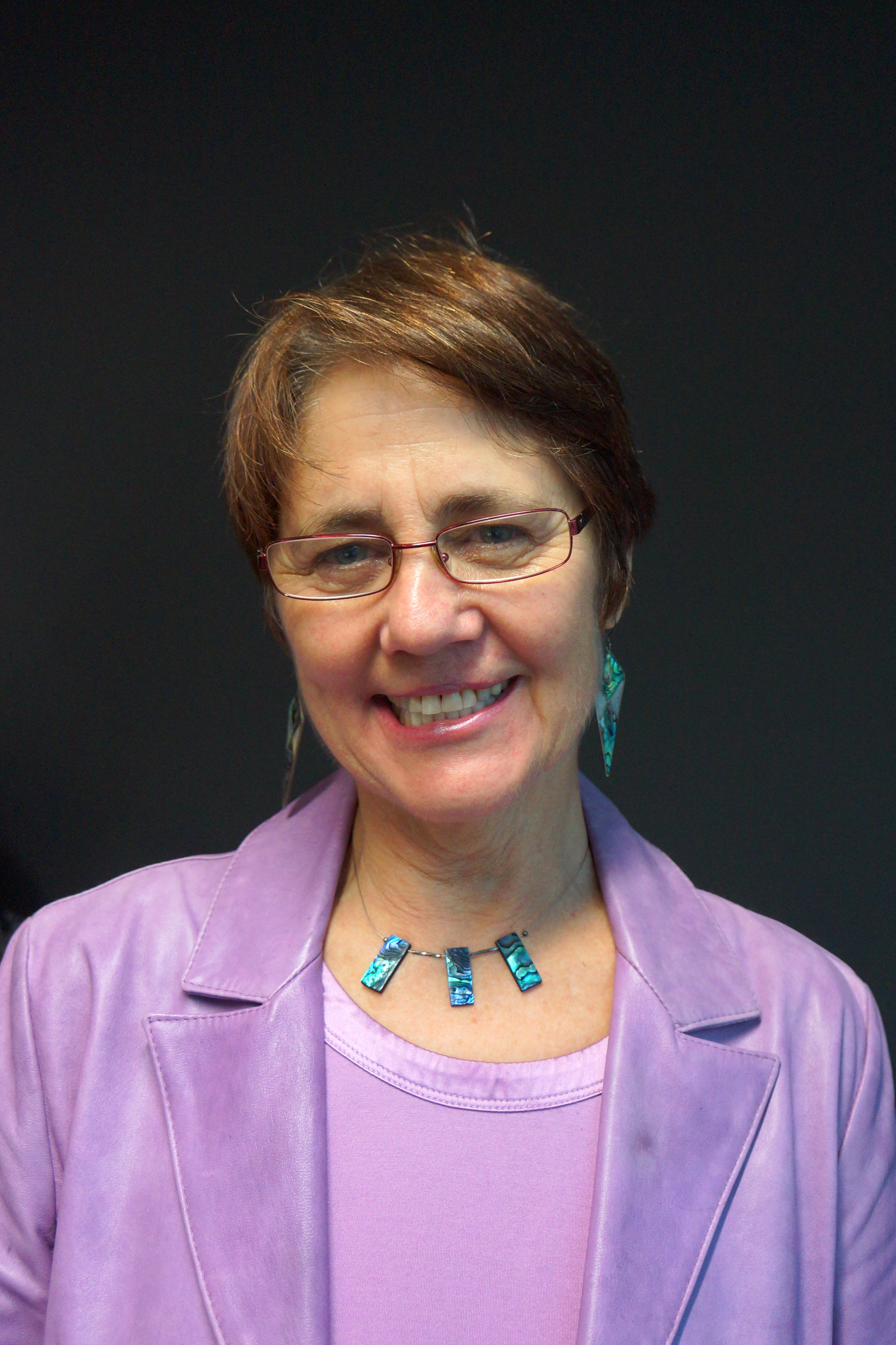
Jan Kemp

== Companion of the Queen's Service Order (QSO) ==
=== For community service ===
- Roma Cherry Balzer – of Hamilton.
- Hamish Roderick Ensor – of Canterbury.
- Allan James Hubbard – of Canterbury.
- William Handley Milbank – of Wanganui.
- Rora Lorna, Lady Ngata JP – of Gisborne.
- Patricia Mary O'Brien – of Ashburton.
- Patrick Francis Ryan – of Rotorua.
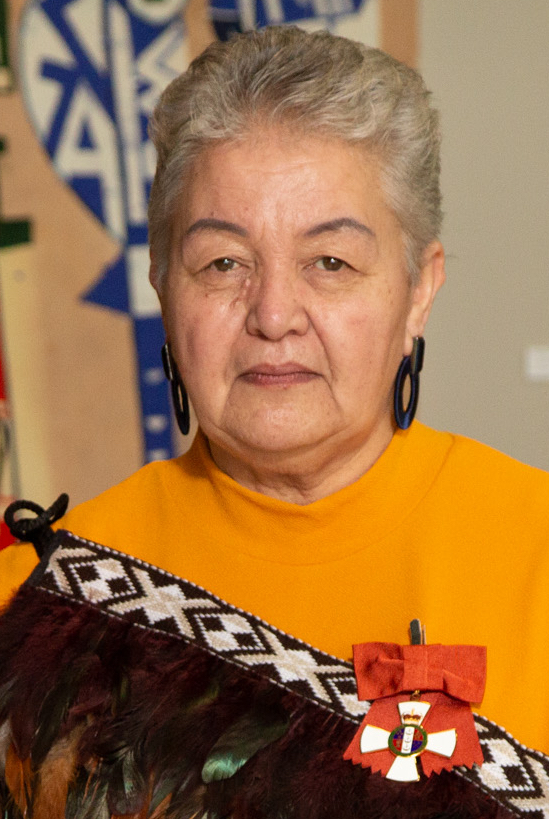
Roma Balzer

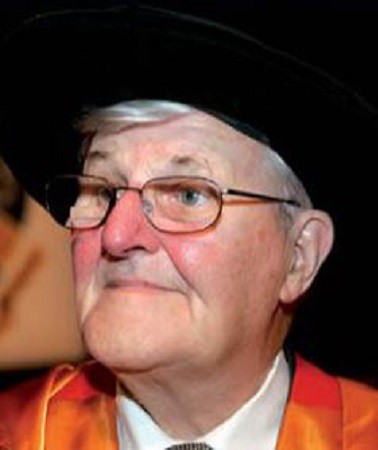
Allan Hubbard

=== For public services ===
- Bruce William Adin – of Papakura.
- Professor Noeline Elizabeth Alcorn – of Hamilton.
- Glenys Faye Baldick – of Nelson.
- Jo Anne Brosnahan – of North Shore City.
- Anna Louisa De Launey Crighton JP – of Christchurch.
- Tūroa Kiniwe Royal ED – of Wellington.
- Patrick Francis Anthony Smith JP – of Chatham Islands.
- William Ernest Berrie Tucker – of Levin.
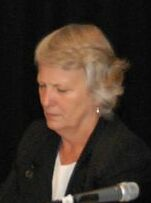
Jo Brosnahan

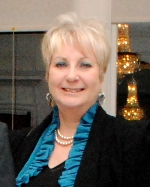
Anna Crighton

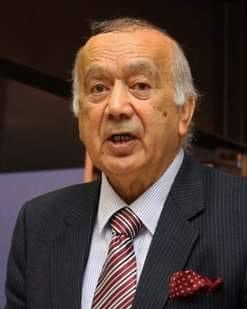
Tūroa Royal

== Queen's Service Medal (QSM) ==
=== For community service ===
- Brian Barratt Attfield – of Cambridge.
- Ian Lionel Baker – of Taranaki.
- Jean Ernestine Bigwood – of Blenheim.
- Ian Albert Burrell JP – of Rotorua.
- Elizabeth Maree Carroll – of Palmerston North.
- Judith Cheung JP – of Manukau City.
- Palitha De Silva – of Wellington.
- Ralph Edward Dixon – of Rotorua.
- Susan Teresa Mary Fowler – of Dannevirke.
- Jeffery James Franklin – of Napier.
- Patricia Mary Hutchison – of Wellington.
- Apotoro Rehita Temepara Temple Isaacs – of Gisborne.
- Diana Jackson – of Christchurch.
- Albert Joseph (Buster) Kells JP – of Palmerston North.
- Richard Hugh Kennaway – of Whangārei.
- Joan Lillian Kennaway – of Whangārei.
- Bernice Winifred Kerr – of Napier.
- Trevor Alexander King – of Manukau City.
- Puspa Lekinwala JP – of Auckland.
- Ian Douglas Mackenzie – of Amberley.
- Maurice Roy Mcgregor – of Christchurch.
- Alexander Robert (Alick) McIntyre – of Westport.
- John Hamilton Milner – of Tūrangi.
- Judith Mary Morgan – of Manukau City.
- Hapi October – of Christchurch.
- Dawn Annie Pearce – of Kaitaia.
- Vijeshwar Prasad JP – of Wanganui.
- Frances Reiri-Smith – of Masterton.
- Graeme Ronald Ross JP – of Lower Hutt.
- Kathleen Vincent Ryan – of Auckland.
- Sheila Marjorie McLeod Sinclair – of Dunedin.
- Shirley Anne Scott Sparks – of Tauranga.
- Alexander Stewart – of Ruawai.
- Mary Eileen Stewart – of Ruawai.
- Joan Barbara Swift JP – of Auckland.
- The Reverend Archdeacon Hariata Ngaruekiterangi Tahana – of Masterton.
- Colleen Waugh – of Waitakere City.
- Kenneth Frank Weaver – of Christchurch.
- Joan Rhoda Wilkinson – of Ashburton.
- Vivian Hazel Wilson JP – of King Country.
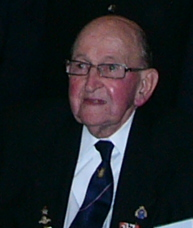
Alick McIntyre

=== For public services ===
- Vernon James Anderson – of Blenheim.
- Glenys Rae Ashby JP – of Manukau City.
- Percy Bookman JP – of Auckland.
- Gary John Bowler – of Hastings.
- Robert Neville Checketts – of Invercargill.
- Richard Beckett Denton JP – of Levin.
- Anthony Thomas Frost – of Nelson.
- David Brian Gillam JP – of Waitakere City.
- Dr Roger Vernon Grace – of Rodney.
- Alison Joan Gracey – of Levin.
- Constance Eileen May Gunn – of Taupō.
- Murrie James Haliday JP – of Waitakere City.
- Stanley Thomas Hall – of Waitakere City.
- Boyd Gardiner Hole – of Thames; chief fire officer, Thames Volunteer Fire Brigade, New Zealand Fire Service.
- Leonard Stuart Home – of Timaru.
- Elliott Anthony Jameson JP – of Pukekohe.
- Reginald Charles George Janes – of Tauranga.
- William Jarvie – of Upper Hutt.
- Judith Marie Kidd – of Waikato.
- Garry Jon Larsen – of Manukau City; senior constable, New Zealand Police.
- Edna Jean McAtamney – of Otago.
- Innes Roy McNeil – of Lower Hutt.
- Michael Ralph Mosby – of Waitakere City; deputy chief fire officer, Waitemata Volunteer Fire Brigade, New Zealand Fire Service.
- Donald Reed Ormsby JP – of Tūrangi.
- Arnold John Perry VRD – of Dunedin.
- Nelson Palmer Ross – of Whangārei.
- Kate Mary Saxton – of Queenstown; sergeant, New Zealand Police.
- Michael Robert Seque – of Canterbury; senior constable, New Zealand Police.
- Steven Mark Simpkin – of Whangārei; detective sergeant, New Zealand Police.
- Mary Celia Smith – of Whangaparāoa.
- Alan John Spurdle – of Taranaki; lately deputy chief fire officer, Inglewood Volunteer Fire Brigade, New Zealand Fire Service.
- Ehau Joseph Thomas Sr. – of Chatham Islands; chief fire officer, Chatham Islands Volunteer Fire Brigade, New Zealand Fire Service.
- Amy Helen Whitten – of Ashhurst.
