= Trevor Clarke =

Trevor Clarke may refer to:

- Trevor Clarke (politician) (born 1967), Northern Irish politician
- Trevor Clarke (footballer) (born 1998), Irish association footballer
- Trevor Clarke (lawyer) (born 1942), New Zealand-born Cook Islands lawyer, businessman, and public servant

== See also ==
- Trevor Clark (disambiguation)
