= Frances Hughes (nurse) =

New Zealand nursing leader

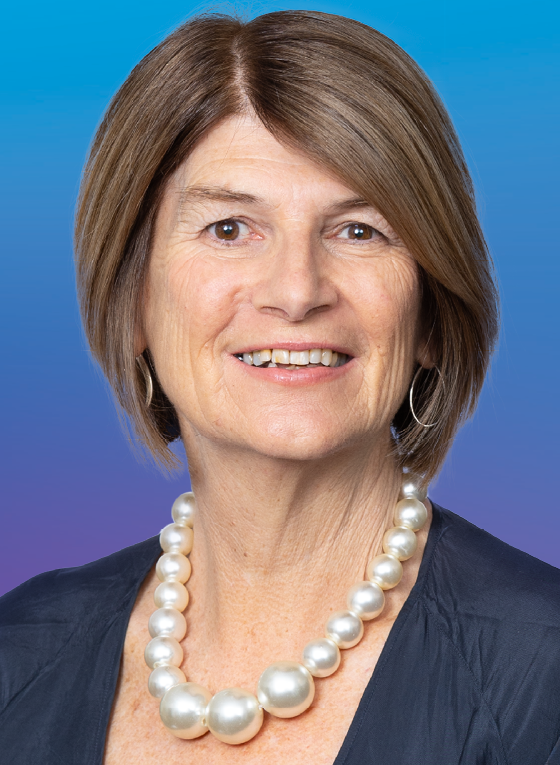
- Awards: Harkness Fellowship, Fulbright Scholarship, Officer of the New Zealand Order of Merit, Companion of the New Zealand Order of Merit

Academic background
- Education: Massey University, Victoria University of Wellington, University of Technology Sydney
- Theses: Aggression and assault in inpatient psychiatric wards: a review of the literature (1997); Policy, politics and nursing: a case study of policy formation in New Zealand (2003)

Academic work
- Institutions: University of Auckland, International Council of Nurses

Frances Anne Hughes CNZM is a New Zealand nursing academic and leader, and has held senior roles across several nursing organisations. In 2005 Hughes was appointed an Officer of the New Zealand Order of Merit, for services to the mental health profession. In 2020 she was appointed a Companion of the New Zealand Order of Merit for services to nursing and mental health.

== Career ==
Hughes completed a Bachelor of Arts and Social Sciences at Massey University in 1987, and a Master of Arts degree in nursing at Victoria University of Wellington in 1997, with a thesis on aggression in psychiatric wards.

Hughes joined the faculty of the University of Auckland as inaugural Professor of Mental Health Nursing in 2002, before completing a Doctor of Nursing Practice at the University of Technology Sydney in 2003, with a thesis titled Policy, politics and nursing: a case study of policy formation in New Zealand.

Hughes was Chief Nurse for New Zealand from 1998 to 2004, and was Chief Executive Officer of the International Council of Nurses from 2016 to 2018. She is Director of Global Strategic Initiatives at the Commission on Graduates of Foreign Nursing Schools, was Chief Nursing and Midwifery Officer for Queensland, Commandant Colonel for the Royal New Zealand Nursing Corps, and worked for the World Health Organization on mental health policy in the Pacific.

Hughes has been awarded a Harkness Fellowship and a Fulbright Scholarship.

== Political candidacy ==
In the 2023 New Zealand general election, Hughes stood as the National Party candidate for the Mana electorate, and was placed 33 on the party list. She received 12,825 votes, placing her second to Labour's Barbara Edmonds, and was listed too low on the National Party list to enter parliament.

== Honours and awards ==
In 2013, Massey University awarded Hughes a Distinguished Alumni Award. In the 2005 Queen's Birthday Honours, Hughes was appointed an Officer of the New Zealand Order of Merit, for services to the mental health profession.

Hughes was awarded the Risk Professional of the Year Award in 2022, for her work during the COVID-19 pandemic, and was described as "one of the most influential nurse leaders in the world".

In the 2020 New Year Honours Hughes was appointed a Companion of the New Zealand Order of Merit for services to nursing and mental health.

== Selected works ==
- Laureen J Hayes; Linda O'Brien-Pallas; Duffield, Christine; et al. (2006). "Nurse turnover: a literature review". International Journal of Nursing Studies. 43 (2): 237–263. doi:10.1016/j.ijnurstu.2005.02.007. PMID 15878771. Wikidata Q36119156.
- Laureen J Hayes; Linda O'Brien-Pallas; Duffield, Christine; Judith Shamian; James Buchan; Hughes, Frances A.; Heather K Spence Laschinger; North, Nicola (2011). "Nurse turnover: a literature review - an update". International Journal of Nursing Studies. 49 (7): 887–905. doi:10.1016/j.ijnurstu.2011.10.001. PMID 22019402. Wikidata Q37948448.
- Linda O'Brien-Pallas; Pat Griffin; Judith Shamian; et al. (2006). "The Impact of Nurse Turnover on Patient, Nurse, and System Outcomes: A Pilot Study and Focus for a Multicenter International Study". Policy. 7 (3): 169–179. doi:10.1177/1527154406291936. PMID 17071704. Wikidata Q62513579.
- Patricia W. Stone; Ann E. Tourangeau; Christine M. Duffield; Hughes, Frances A.; Cheryl B. Jones; Linda O'Brien-Pallas; Judith Shamian (2003). "Evidence of Nurse Working Conditions: A Global Perspective". Policy. 4 (2): 120–130. doi:10.1177/1527154403004002005. Wikidata Q59167085.
- North, Nicola; Hughes, Frances A. (2012). "A systems perspective on nursing productivity". Journal of Health, Organization and Management. 26 (2): 192–214. doi:10.1108/14777261211230772. PMID 22856176. Wikidata Q38031529.
- Hughes, Frances A. (2009). "Mental health in the Pacific: the role of the Pacific Island Mental Health Network". Pacific health dialog : a publication of the Pacific Basin Officers Training Program and the Fiji School of Medicine. 15 (1): 177–180. PMID 19585749. Wikidata Q51866432.
