= Patrick Higgins =

Patrick Higgins may refer to:

- Patrick Higgins (American football) (born 1963), American football coach and former player
- Patrick Higgins (musician) (born 1984), American composer, guitarist and producer
- Patrick Higgins (politician) (1825–1882), Irish-born Australian politician
- Pat Higgins (born 1974), film director
- Pat Higgins (businessman) (born c. 1938), New Zealand businessman and philanthropist
