= Terry Sturm =

New Zealand editor and academic (1941–2009)

Terry Sturm CBE
- Born: 11 July 1941; Auckland, New Zealand
- Died: 25 May 2009 (aged 67); Auckland, New Zealand
- Occupations: Editor; academic
- Spouses: Helen Gilbert (m. 1964; div. 1993) Linda Cassells (m. 2002)
- Children: 3

Academic background
- Education: University of Leeds (PhD, 1967)
- Thesis: Problems of cultural dependence in New Zealand and Australian poetry: with special reference to the work of R.A.K. Mason, Charles Brasch and Allen Curnow, and of Christopher Brennan, A.D. Hope and Judith Wright (1967)
- Doctoral advisor: Norman Jeffares

Academic work
- Discipline: English literature
- Sub-discipline: New Zealand literature, Australian literature
- Institutions: University of Auckland (professor); University of Sydney (associate professor)
- Notable works: The Oxford History of New Zealand Literature in English (1991, 1998)

Terence Laurie Sturm CBE (11 July 1941 – 25 May 2009) was a New Zealand professor of English literature and editor. His scholarship was mainly in the fields of Australian and New Zealand literature. He lectured at the University of Sydney from 1967 to 1980, after which he became professor of English at the University of Auckland. He edited the Oxford History of New Zealand Literature in English (first edition 1991, second edition 1998).

== Early life and education ==
Sturm was born in Auckland on 11 July 1941, one of four children of orchardist Leslie Sturm and Gladys Ashby. He grew up in the suburb of Henderson; he attended Henderson High School and transferred to Auckland Grammar School at the suggestion of his English teacher. He was of British, German, and Māori descent (Ngāti Rakaipaaka), and was a great-grandson of botanist Friedrich Wilhelm Christian Sturm and Hinerakau Tiarere.

He obtained his undergraduate and master's degree from the University of Auckland in the early 1960s, and received the Fowlds Memorial Prize for the best student in the arts faculty. In 1964 he married his first wife, Helen Gilbert.

In 1967 Sturm graduated with his doctorate from the University of Leeds. Having received the New Zealand Postgraduate Scholarship and Eliot Davis Scholarship, he initially planned to complete his doctorate at Trinity College at the University of Cambridge. However, his potential supervisor Donald Davie moved overseas. He therefore transferred to Leeds where he was supervised by Norman Jeffares. His thesis was about New Zealand and Australian poetry.

== Academic career ==
Sturm lectured in the English department at the University of Sydney from 1967 to 1980, and was promoted to senior lecturer in 1972 and associate professor in 1978. During this time he edited two works by Frank S. Anthony for the New Zealand Fiction series being published by Auckland University Press. He also contributed a chapter on drama and theatre to The Oxford History of Australian Literature.

In 1980, he was made chair and professor of English at the University of Auckland. From 1982 to 1992 he was the chairman of the New Zealand Literary Fund Advisory Committee and its successor, the Literature Committee at the Queen Elizabeth 2 Arts Council. In 1984 he edited a collection of poems by Christopher Brennan for the Queensland University Press.

The New Zealand Herald described Sturm as playing a "leading role in placing New Zealand literature at the centre of the academic curriculum". As professor at the University of Auckland and head of the English department for three terms, he expanded courses on both Australian and New Zealand literature, including establishing the first chair in New Zealand literature, held initially by Albert Wendt. In addition to serving as head of department he also spent time serving as Assistant Pro-Vice Chancellor (Māori), and from 2000 to 2003 as Associate Dean (Research).

In the 1990 Queen's Birthday Honours, he was appointed a Commander of the Order of the British Empire, for services to literature. Around 1993 his first marriage broke down, and he met Linda Cassells, the publisher for Oxford University Press; they married in 2002.

He was the editor of the Oxford History of New Zealand Literature in English, published in 1991 (first edition) and 1998 (second edition). He was the writer of the chapter on popular fiction, and directed the concept and approach of the whole work. Michael King in a review described it "as close to perfection as such a book can come". He also edited the New Zealand section of the Routledge Encyclopedia of Post-Colonial Literatures in English (1994). In 1998 and 2000 he edited two collections of poems by Louis Johnson. From 1997 to 2001, he served as the first convenor of the humanities panel of the Marsden Fund.

In 2003, he published An Unsettled Spirit: The Life & Frontier Fiction of Edith Lyttleton, a biography of Edith Lyttleton. It was a finalist for the biography award at the Montana New Zealand Book Awards in 2004. Fellow academic MacDonald P. Jackson called it "a rich contribution to the history of postcolonial writing, of women's writing, and of the publishing industry". In 2006 he retired from the university and was appointed emeritus professor.

One of his research areas was the work of Allen Curnow who sometimes wrote humorous verse under the pseudonym Whim Wham; Sturm was the editor of the 2005 collection Whim Wham's New Zealand: the best of Whim Wham, 1937–1988, which was launched by then prime minister Helen Clark. At the time of his death in 2009 he had been editing a comprehensive collection of Curnow's poems for publication, in addition to writing a biography. Both were published in two volumes by Auckland University Press in 2017; editing the collected poems was completed by Elizabeth Caffin. The biography was edited and completed by Cassells, his widow.

== Selected works ==
- The Oxford History of New Zealand Literature in English (editor, Oxford University Press, 1991 and 1998)
- An Unsettled Spirit: The Life & Frontier Fiction of Edith Lyttleton (Auckland University Press, 2003)
- Whim Wham's New Zealand: the best of Whim Wham, 1937–1988 (editor, Vintage Books, 2005)
- Allen Curnow: Simply by Sailing in a New Direction, a Biography (Auckland University Press, 2017, edited by Linda Cassells)
- Allen Curnow: Collected Poems (editor with Elizabeth Caffin, Auckland University Press, 2017)
