= Elizabeth Caffin =

NZ writer, author and publisher

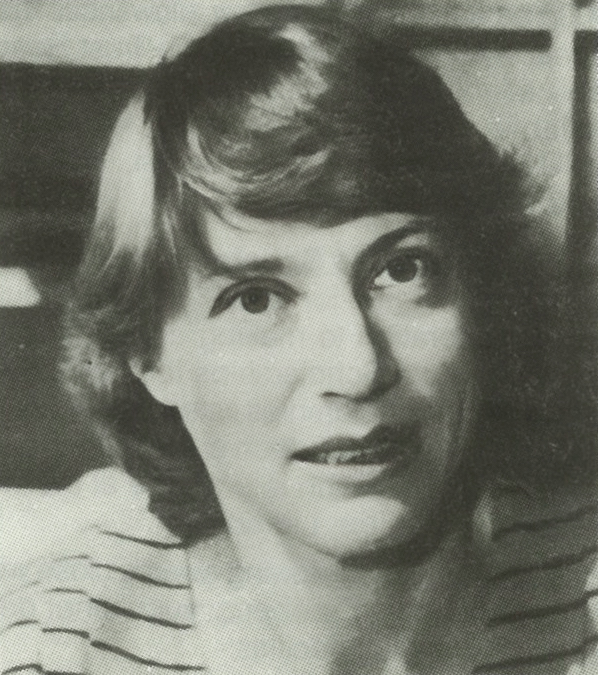
Caffin, c. 1985

Elizabeth Palmer Caffin MNZM is a writer, editor and publisher from New Zealand.

Caffin began her publishing career with a position at Reed Publishing in 1976. She was later the director of Auckland University Press for more than ten years. She is a kaitiaki of the Alexander Turnbull Library, and has served on a number of arts bodies including the Queen Elizabeth II Arts Council, the Press Council, the Literary Fund Advisory Council and Book Publishers Association of New Zealand.

== Publications ==
- Introducing Katherine Mansfield (1982), Longman Paul
- The Deepening Stream: A History of the New Zealand Literary Fund (with Andrew Mason, 2016), Victoria University Press
- Allen Curnow: Collected Poems (with Terry Sturm, 2017), Auckland University Press

== Recognition ==
In the 2005 Queen's Birthday Honours, Caffin was appointed a Member of the New Zealand Order of Merit, for services to literature. In 2009, she was awarded an honorary doctorate by the University of Auckland.
