= Suzanne Snively =

American company director and economic strategist in New Zealand

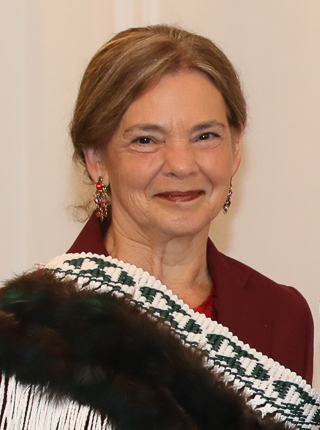
Snively in 2021

Suzanne Lee Snively DNZM is an American company director and economic strategist in New Zealand.

== Biography ==
Snively was born in the United States and came to New Zealand on a scholarship from the Fulbright Program in 1972. She completed a master's degree at Victoria University of Wellington in 1986, with a thesis on the influence of the budget on household incomes.

She has served as a director of the Reserve Bank of New Zealand, of the New Zealand Army Leadership Board, an economic consultant to Housing New Zealand, and is a member of the Institute of Directors and the New Zealand Association of Economists.

Snively is chair of Transparency International New Zealand, part of an independent global initiative fighting corruption.

=== Recognition ===
In 1993, Snively received a New Zealand Suffrage Centennial Medal. In the 2005 Queen's Birthday Honours, she was appointed an Honorary Officer of the New Zealand Order of Merit, for services to business. In 2013, she was named Wellingtonian of the Year.

In the 2021 New Year Honours, Snively was promoted to Honorary Dame Companion of the New Zealand Order of Merit, for services to governance.

=== Personal life ===
Snively is married to broadcaster Ian Fraser.
