= MacDonald P. Jackson =

New Zealand literature scholar

MacDonald Pairman Jackson FNZAH FRSNZ is a New Zealand scholar of English literature. Most of his work is on English Renaissance drama; he specialises in authorship attribution. He is also internationally recognised for his work on Shakespeare's texts.

== Personal background ==
Jackson was born in Auckland on 13 October 1938, the son of Donald Leslie Jackson and Margaret Wyld Pairman. He married Nicole Phillipa Cameron Lovett in 1964. He is currently Emeritus Professor of English at the University of Auckland.

== Academic history and awards ==
Jackson was educated at Auckland Grammar School, obtained a BA from Auckland University in 1959 and an MA(English) in 1960. He attended Merton College, Oxford and qualified for B.Litt. in 1964. In 1964 he returned to Auckland University as a lecturer. He was appointed associate professor in 1978 and professor in 1989. Jackson obtained a Folger fellowship in 1989 and a Huntington Library fellowship in 1993. He was a Christensen Fellow at St Catherine's College, Oxford in 2000 and S T Lee Professorial Fellow at the School of Advanced Study, University of London from January to June 2005. He received a Distinguished Teaching Award in 2000. He retired from the university in 2004. In 2008 he was made a Fellow of the New Zealand Academy of the Humanities (FNZAH). In 2009 he was appointed a Fellow of the Royal Society of New Zealand (FRSNZ).

== Writing and research ==
Jackson's research includes a year-long examination of the disputed authorship of the classic poem "The Night Before Christmas", also called "A Visit from St. Nicholas." Jackson applied modern computational stylistics techniques to the corpora of verse left by both claimants, Clement Clarke Moore and Henry Livingston Jr., including a new test, statistical analysis of phonemes. His 2016 book, Who Wrote "The Night Before Christmas"? argues that Livingston is the true author and makes a significant contribution to the field of attribution studies.

Jackson's Studies in Attribution: Middleton and Shakespeare (Salzburg, 1979) helped establish the dramatic canon of Thomas Middleton. From 1984 to 1991 Jackson contributed the annual reviews of "Editions and Textual Studies" to Shakespeare Survey.

Jackson has written thirteen books as either author or editor. His works include:

- Determining the Shakespeare Canon: Arden of Faversham and A Lover's Complaint (Oxford, 2015)
- Defining Shakespeare: 'Pericles' as Test Case (Oxford, 2003) – author
- Second and third volumes of the Cambridge edition of The Works of John Webster (2003 and 2007) – co-editor with two others
- The Oxford Thomas Middleton: The Collected Works (2007) – associate general editor
- Thomas Middleton and Early Modern Textual Culture (2007) – associate general editor
- The Revenger's Tragedy and writing the essay "Early Modern Authorship: Canons and Chronologies" – editor and author

The later three works won the Modern Language Association Award for the best edition of the year and the Elizabeth Dietz Memorial Award for the best book published in early modern studies. In the field of early modern drama he has made over 200 contributions to books and academic journals.

As of 2010 his research projects included Shakespeare and his contemporaries, New Zealand literature, Poetry in English, and a major project: a fourth volume of the Cambridge Works of John Webster. Jackson was working on this together with David Carnegie and David Gunby.

== Further interests ==
In addition Jackson is an anthologist, literary historian, and critic of New Zealand poetry. He contributed to the Oxford History of New Zealand Literature in English (1991) edited by Terry Sturm, writing the chapter on "Poetry: Beginnings to 1945". He is a member of the editorial boards for the Shakespeare Quarterly, the Arden Critical Companions series, the Digital Renaissance Editions series, and The New Oxford Shakespeare. He was elected a Life Member of the Australian and New Zealand Shakespeare Association in 2004.

Jackson has been involved in broadcasting, introducing NZBC's monthly poetry programme in 1966, and a New Zealand Book Awards judge. He has been a competitor in veterans running and his interests include music, theatre, film, and gardening. He currently resides in Auckland.
