= Roma Balzer =

New Zealand family violence prevention advocate

Roma Balzer QSO CNZM
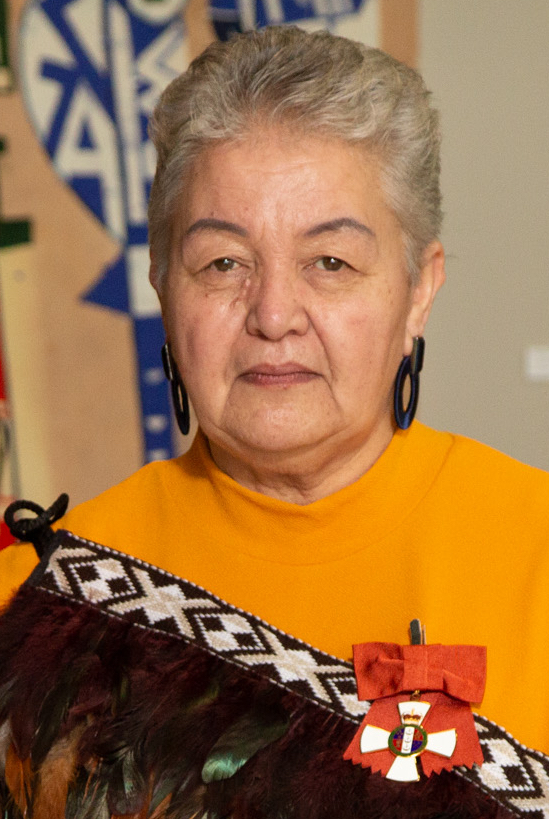
- Born: 1954; Rotorua
- Awards: Companion of the New Zealand Order of Merit

Roma Cherry Balzer QSO CNZM (born 1954) is a New Zealand family violence prevention advocate. She has worked in family violence prevention for more than forty years. In 2005 Balzer was appointed a Companion of the Queen’s Service Order for her services to families and the community. In 2019 she was appointed a Companion of the New Zealand Order of Merit for services to services to family violence prevention.

== Early life and education ==
Balzer is Māori and affiliates to Ngāti Ranginui, Ngāi Te Rangi, Raukawa and Te Aroha iwi. She was born in 1954 in Rotorua, and attended Rotorua Girls' High School. Balzer worked at Tokanui Hospital, teaching disabled children, for two years. She moved around for several years, and during time spent in Hamilton joined the Women's Health Collective, and attended evening classes on women in politics. Returning to Rotorua as a solo parent with three children, Balzer began working in paid and volunteer roles in community support. Balzer was involved in the protests again the 1981 Springbok tour and was arrested at Bastion Point.

Balzer has worked in family violence prevention for more than forty years. Balzer joined the steering group of the Rotorua Women's Refuge, and then represented Rotorua on the executive of the National Women's Refuge. In 1986 she became the first Māori National Co-ordinator of Women Refuges. Balzer worked with the Ministry of Social Development to develop a residential programme for children in Hamilton in the youth justice system, and with Oranga Tamariki to establish a home for children in state care with complex needs. Balzer founded the Silent Witness Project to identify people killed due to family violence.

Balzer was a trustee for Te Runanga o Kirikiriroa for twenty years, standing down in 2017. She is on the governance board of Reclaim Another Woman, an organisation that works to support women and end intergenerational offending.

== Honours and awards ==
In the 2005 Queen's Birthday Honours Balzer was appointed a Companion of the Queen’s Service Order for her services to families and the community. In the 2019 Queen's Birthday Honours she was appointed a Companion of the New Zealand Order of Merit for services to services to family violence prevention.
