= Ian Fraser (broadcaster) =

New Zealand broadcaster and personality

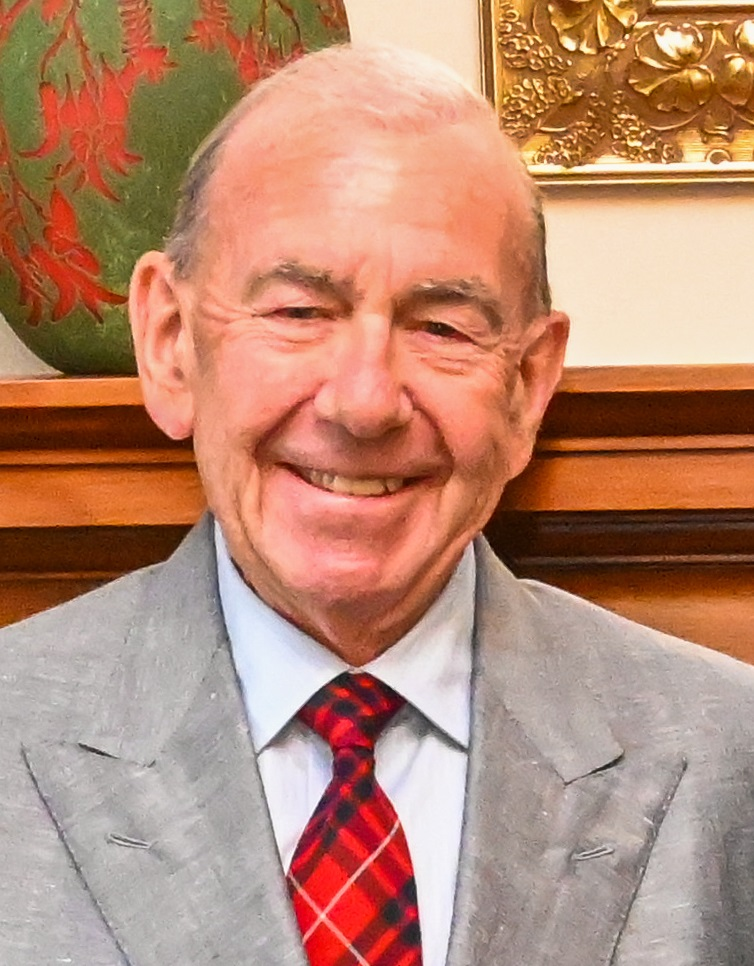
Fraser in 2023

Ian Geoffrey Fraser OBE (born 7 September 1948) is a New Zealand broadcaster and personality. He was the chief executive officer of Television New Zealand from 2002 until 2005.

== Biography ==
Fraser was born in Dunedin on 7 September 1948. He was educated at Otago Boys' High School, and went on to study modern languages at the University of Otago, graduating with a Bachelor of Arts degree. As a pianist, he received an associate diploma (ATCL) from Trinity College London in 1963. Fraser decided to pursue acting, and appeared in several performances at Dunedin's Globe Theatre. Through these performances he came to know former conscientious objector Archibald Baxter. Fraser, whose opinions already included opposition to the Vietnam War, found his anti-war views encouraged by this friendship, leading to lifelong pacifist views.

At age 22, Fraser moved to Wellington to continue his acting career. He performed in plays at Downstage and in 1973 he was part of forming Playmarket, the New Zealand agent for playwrights alongside Nonnita Rees, Judy Russell and Robert Lord. During this time Fraser worked as a journalist, wrote reviews of plays and was also the executive officer of the QEII Arts Council, the New Zealand arts funding body (now Creative New Zealand).

He started his broadcasting career as an anchor at Radio New Zealand working on the news programme Checkpoint. Fraser became well-known in New Zealand as a television interviewer, working on current affairs shows from 1974 until 1984. He then moved to public relations, becoming the chairman of Consultus and fronting a series of advertisements for the Bank of New Zealand. After heading projects for New Zealand Expo in Brisbane and Seville, Fraser became chief executive of the New Zealand Symphony Orchestra.

He moved to Television New Zealand (TVNZ) in April 2002 into the role of Chief Executive Officer. During his time in this office, TVNZ made a transition from a wholly commercial broadcaster to a public company operating under a charter.

He resigned on 30 October 2005 following a dispute with the TVNZ board over the salary negotiations of the top presenters. The board insisted it take over negotiations of salary packages over $300,000, which Fraser refused.

Fraser criticised TVNZ's board in December 2005 during a finance and expenditure select committee enquiry, and was accused of serious misconduct and stripped of his remaining duties by the board as a result. In February 2006, he threatened legal action over the misconduct claim and TVNZ withdrew the censure.

In the 1990 Queen's Birthday Honours, Fraser was appointed an Officer of the Order of the British Empire, for public services.

Since retirement, Fraser has served as patron of the Archibald Baxter Memorial Trust.

== Film and television credits ==
- 2015: Breathing is Singing – Research – Film
- 2010: Lest We Forget – Presenter – Television
- 2010: 50 Years of New Zealand Television: 1 – From One Channel to One Hundred – Subject – Television
- 2005: 50 Ways of Saying Fabulous – As: Referee – Film
- 1997: The Gong Show – Judge – Television
- 1996: Revolution – 2, The Grand Illusion – Presenter – Television
- 1996: Revolution – 4, The New Country – Presenter – Television
- 1996: Revolution – 1, Fortress New Zealand – Presenter – Television
- 1996: Revolution – 3, The Great Divide – Presenter – Television
- 1996–1998: Showcase – Presenter – Television
- 1996: Showcase – 1996 Grand Final – Presenter – Television
- 1996: Showcase – 1996 Viewers' Final – Presenter – Television
- 1994–1998: Fraser – Presenter – Television
- 1993: Counterpoint - Presenter – Television
- 1992: The Party's Over - Subject – Television
- 1991: Logan Brewer – The Man Behind the Razmatazz - Subject – Television
- 1990: Living Treasures - Presenter, Executive Producer – Television
- 1990: Living Treasures – Friedensreich Hundertwasser – Interviewer, Executive Producer – Television
- 1988: Fourth Estate – Final Episode - Subject – Television
- 1988–1994: Frontline - Presenter – Television
- 1984: Sunday - Presenter – Television
- 1983: Kaleidoscope – Bruce Mason 1921–1982 - Subject – Television
- 1983: Kaleidoscope – Decade of the Enz - Reporter – Television
- 1983: Ashkenazy in Concert - Interviewer – Television
- 1982: Newsmakers – David Frost - Presenter – Television
- 1979–1983: Newsmakers - Presenter – Television
- 1979: The Ray Woolf Show – Christmas Special - Pianist – Television
- 1977: Will the Real Mr Claus Please Stand Up - Guest – Television
- 1977–1980: Dateline Monday - Presenter – Television
- 1976: Houses Built on Sand - Reporter – Television
- 1975–1977: Seven Days - Reporter – Television
- 1974–1976: Nationwide - Reporter – Television

== Personal life ==
Fraser married Suzanne Snively in 1975, and the couple went on to have three children. Sniveley is an economist and managing director of strategic and economic advice company, MoreMedia Enterprises.

== See also ==
- Media related to Ian Fraser (broadcaster) at Wikimedia Commons
- List of New Zealand television personalities
