= Friedrich Wilhelm Christian Sturm =

New Zealand Naturalist

Friedrich Wilhelm Christian Sturm (1810/11 – 23 May 1896) was a New Zealand naturalist, interpreter and nursery owner. He was born in Germany or Austria in about 1810. He was an early settler in New Zealand, arriving in 1839 in Napier (then known as Ahuriri). New Zealand botanist and missionary William Colenso described two plants after Sturm, Cordyline sturmii (a synonym of Cordyline australis) and Calceolaria sturmii (now called Jovellana sinclarii).
