= Michael Daniell =

New Zealand businessman and electrical engineer

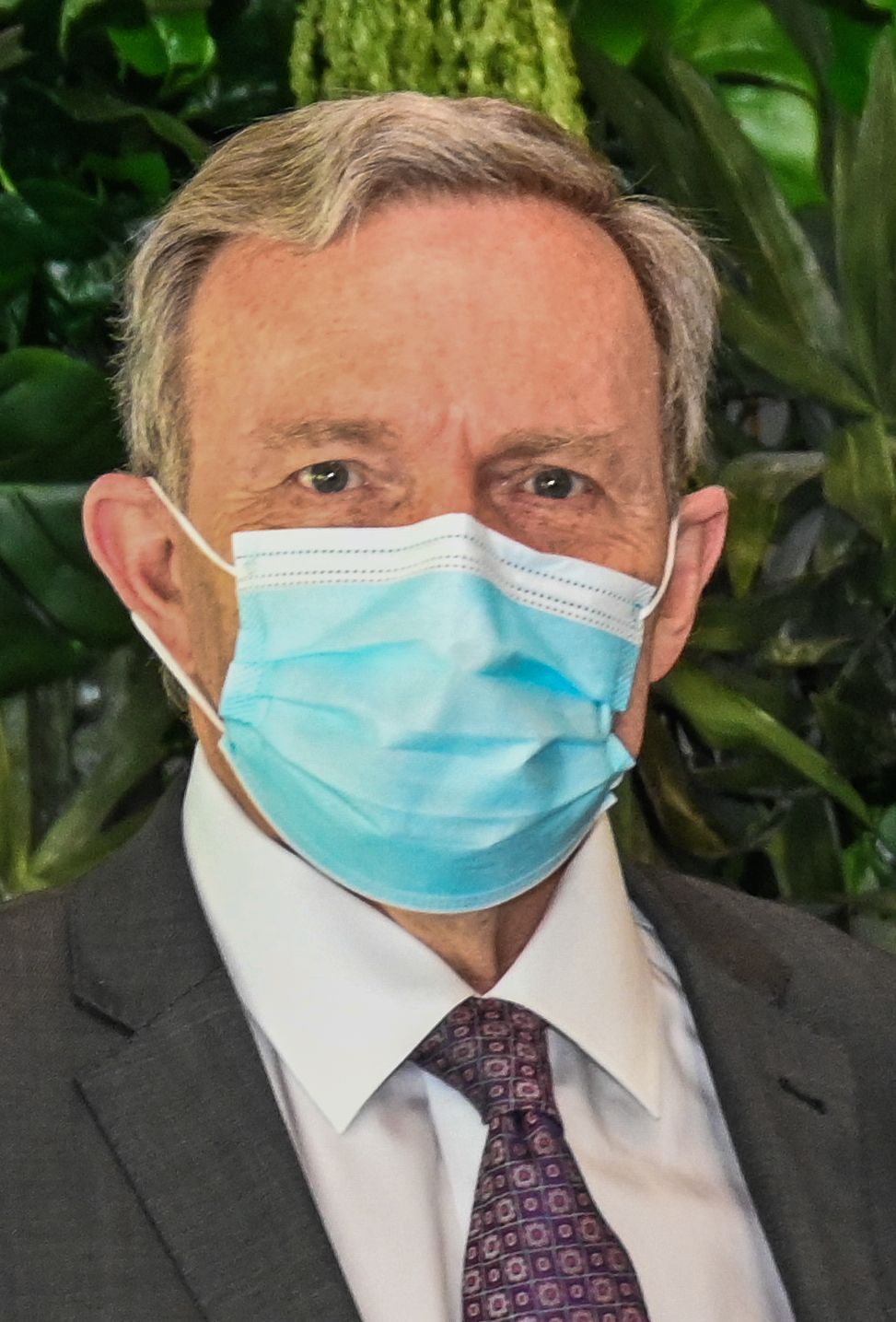
Daniell in 2022

Sir Michael Grenfell Daniell KNZM (born 1956 or 1957) is a New Zealand electrical engineer and businessman. He was chief executive officer of Fisher & Paykel Healthcare from 2001 until 2016. In the 2021 Queen's Birthday Honours, he was appointed a Knight Companion of the New Zealand Order of Merit, for services to business, healthcare and governance.
