= Jo Brosnahan =

New Zealand company director

Dame Jo Brosnahan DNZM QSO
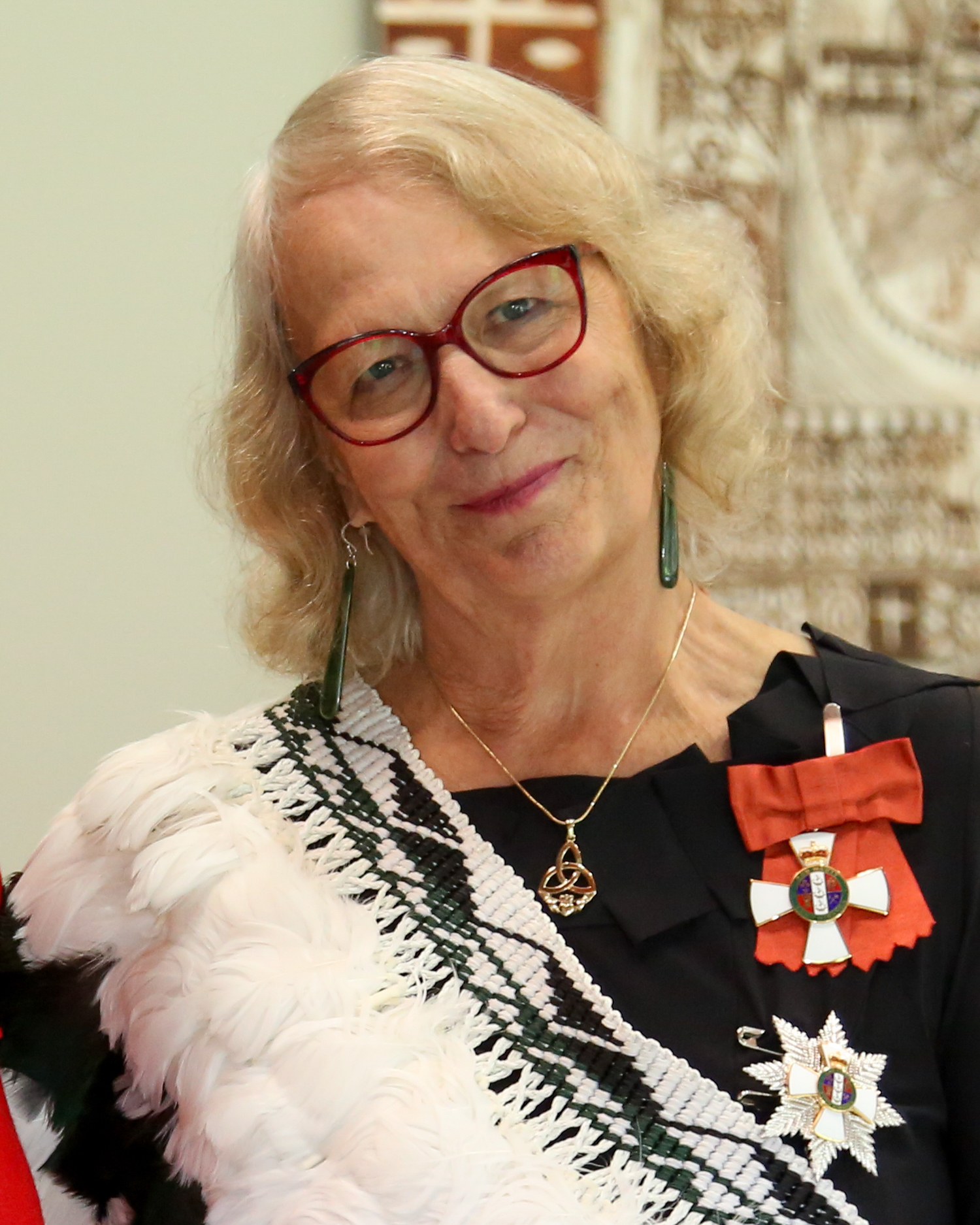
- Brosnahan in 2023

Chief executive of Northland Regional Council
- In office 1991–1996

Chief executive of Auckland Regional Council
- In office 1996–2003
- Preceded by: George Tyler
- Succeeded by: Peter Winder

Personal details
- Born: Whangārei, New Zealand
- Spouse: Chris Brosnahan
- Children: 2
- Education: University of Auckland
- Occupation: Company director

Dame Jo Anne Brosnahan DNZM QSO is a New Zealand company director and leadership adviser, and former regional government executive. She served as chief executive of Northland Regional Council for five years from 1991, followed by eight years as chief executive of Auckland Regional Council. In 2005, Brosnahan was appointed a Companion of the Queen's Service Order for public services, and in 2023 she was appointed Dame Companion of the New Zealand Order of Merit, for services to services to governance and business.

== Early life and family ==
Brosnahan was born in Whangārei attending Kamo High School, and studied at the University of Auckland, earning a Bachelor of Arts in geography and economics, and a Masters Honours degree in geography. She married Chris Brosnahan in 1976, a real estate executive, and the couple went on to have two daughters.

== Career ==
After leaving university, Brosnahan took a position as a research officer with the New Zealand Railways Department. She was part of a group investigating the feasibility of rapid rail in Auckland, before returning to Whangārei in 1978 to carry out a rail-freight study. She then moved to the Northland Harbour Board, first as economics and planning officer and later as commercial manager. She left in 1987 to establish a consulting business, North Ventures. Later, also founding an employment agency, Venture Employment.

Brosnahan first was elected to the Northland Regional Council in 1988. Brosnahan went on to be appointed chief executive officer of Northland Regional Council in 1991. In that position, she steered the council's sale of its 25 percent stake in the Northland Port Corporation and the establishment of a community employment and development trust funded using the interest earned on the proceeds of the sale. She took a year's leave of absence in 1995–1996 to complete a Harkness Fellowship studying public-sector leadership at Duke University in the United States, before taking up the position of chief executive officer of Auckland Regional Council (ARC) in September 1996. During her tenure as ARC chief executive, she was involved in moving $1.6 billion of assets from central government to ARC control, as well as securing over $1 billion of fuel taxes to address Auckland's transport issues. She left the role in December 2004, with 18 months of her contract remaining, after a dispute with ARC chair Gwen Bull.

In 2003, Brosnahan founded Leadership New Zealand, a non-profit organisation established to foster a "culture of leadership" across New Zealand society, and served as its chair for over a decade. As of 2023, the organisation had produced over 700 alumni across the business, Māori, social services and community sectors.

Brosnahan has held governance roles across a range of community, education, research, local government and infrastructure bodies. She was chair of Northland Regional Development Council from 1986 to 1989, Northpower Fibre from 2011, Taitokerau Education Trust from 2014 to 2019, Maritime New Zealand from 2018, engineering consultancy firm Harrison Grierson since 2019, and chair of Heritage New Zealand in 2024.. She is also a past chair of Manaaki Whenua – Landcare Research, Medial and Surgical Development Group of the Northland Area Health Board.

== Honours and awards ==
In 1990 Brosnahan was awarded the New Zealand 1990 Commemoration Medal. In the 2005 Queen's Birthday Honours, she was appointed a Companion of the Queen's Service Order, for public services. In the 2023 King's Birthday and Coronation Honours, she was made a Dame Companion of the New Zealand Order of Merit, for services to governance and business.
