= Anna Crighton =

New Zealand heritage campaigner and local politician (born 1944)

Dame Anna Crighton DNZM QSO JP
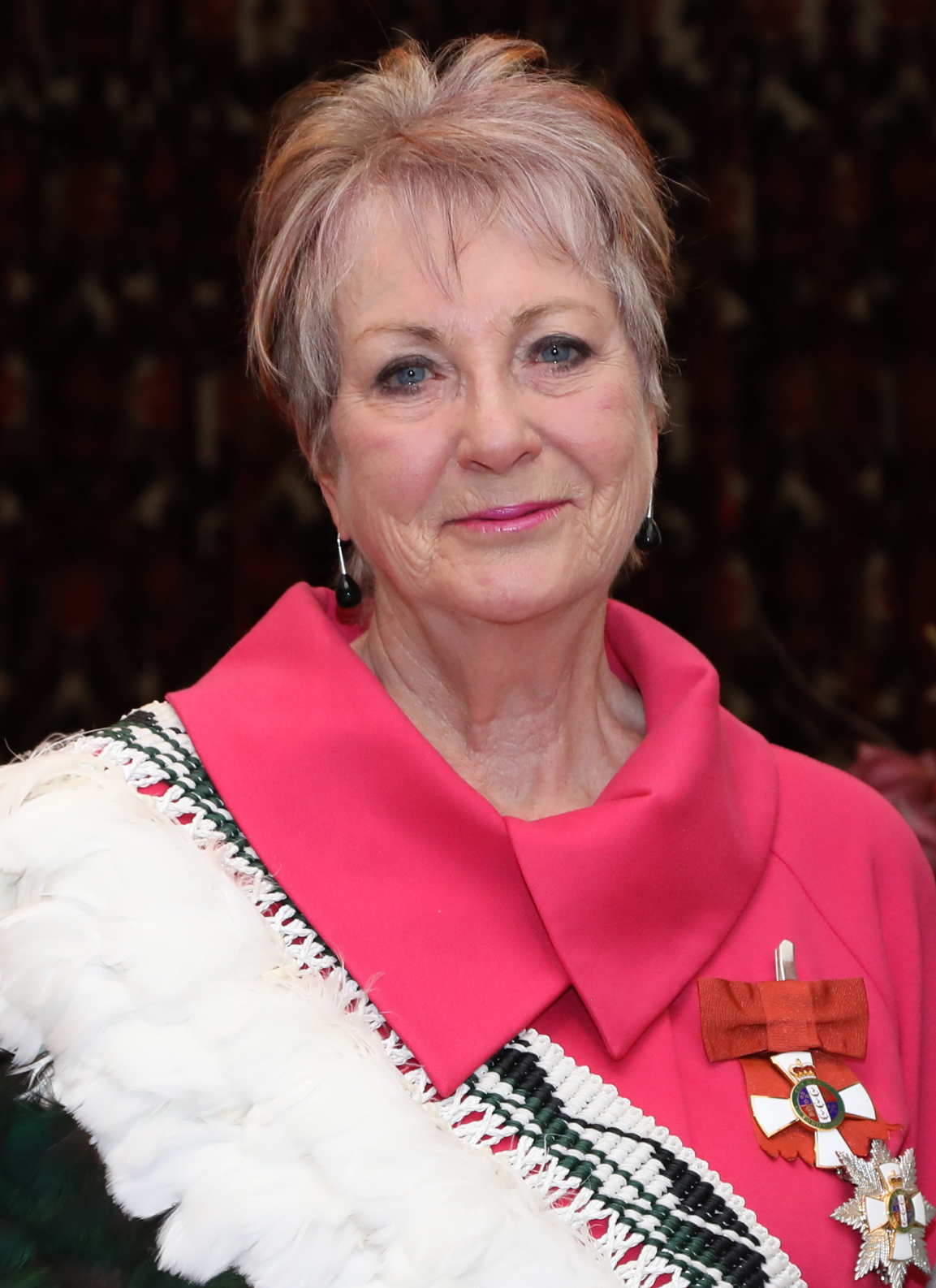
- Crighton in 2020
- Born: Anna Louisa de Launey Crighton; January 1944 (age 82); Christchurch, New Zealand

Academic background
- Education: University of Canterbury (BA, MA); University of Otago (PhD)
- Thesis: The selection and presentation culture of the Robert McDougall Art Gallery, Christchurch, New Zealand, 1932–2002 (2012)

Dame Anna Louisa de Launey Crighton DNZM QSO JP (born January 1944) is a New Zealand heritage campaigner and historian, and former local-body politician in Christchurch.

== Biography ==
Crighton was born in Christchurch in January 1944. She attended Christchurch East Primary School, before her family moved to Dunedin. There she attended Pinehill School and Otago Girls' High School, before returning to Christchurch where she went to Christchurch Girls’ High School. After travelling overseas and a brief unsuccessful marriage, she worked and was a single parent in North Canterbury, before moving back to Christchurch where she completed her education. She earned School Certificate and University Entrance by correspondence, before enrolling at the University of Canterbury with a scholarship as a mature student. Her Bachelor of Arts degree in history, art history and classics, was followed by a Master of Arts degree, with a thesis on colonial architecture.

In 1979, Crighton was appointed registrar or collections manager at the Robert McDougall Art Gallery, where she remained until 2001. For part of that time, she served as the New Zealand representative on the committee of the American Association of Museum Registrars.

In the 1989 local elections, Crighton stood in the Hagley ward of Christchurch City Council as an independent. She came eighth of twelve candidates in the ward that returned three board members. She later became a community board member and chair, and she was a Christchurch city councillor from 1995 to 2007. She has a long association with Christchurch Heritage Ltd and the Christchurch Heritage Trust, which she founded in 1996. The trust purchased the former Trinity Church in Worcester Street and saved it from demolition.

From 2008, Crighton undertook doctoral research through the University of Otago. She completed her PhD studies, which had been disrupted by the Christchurch earthquakes, with her thesis titled The selection and presentation culture of the Robert McDougall Art Gallery, Christchurch, New Zealand, 1932–2002. Her doctoral thesis led to the book, English, Colonial, Modern and Māori: The Changing Faces of the Robert McDougall Art Gallery, Christchurch, New Zealand, 1932–2002, which was published in 2014.

From 2010 to 2014, Crighton was chair of the Canterbury Earthquake Heritage Buildings Fund Trust. Since 2001, she has been a director the Theatre Royal Charitable Foundation, and she has chaired the Christchurch Heritage Awards Charitable Trust since 2009. She served as a board member of the New Zealand Historic Places Trust between 2003 and 2010, and she was president of Historic Places Aotearoa between 2010 and 2013. Crighton was an elected member of the Canterbury District Health Board for 12 years, from 2007 to 2019.

== Honours ==
In the 2005 Queen's Birthday Honours, Crighton was appointed a Companion of the Queen's Service Order for public services. In the 2020 New Year Honours, she was appointed a Dame Companion of the New Zealand Order of Merit, for services to heritage preservation and governance.
