= Policy, Politics, & Nursing Practice =

- Discipline: Nursing
- Language: English
- Edited by: Sally S. Cohen

Publication details
- History: 2000-present
- Publisher: SAGE Publications
- Frequency: Quarterly

Standard abbreviations
- ISO 4: Policy Politics Nurs. Pract.

Indexing
- ISSN: 1527-1544 (print); 1552-7468 (web)
- LCCN: 99009429
- OCLC no.: 44511586

Links
- Journal homepage; Online access; Online archive

Policy, Politics, & Nursing Practice is a quarterly peer-reviewed nursing journal that covers the field of nursing and health policy. The editor-in-chief is Sally S. Cohen (New York University College of Nursing). It was established in 2000 and is currently published by SAGE Publications.

== Abstracting and indexing ==
Policy, Politics, & Nursing Practice is abstracted and indexed in:

- Academic Search
- CINAHL
- EmCare
- MEDLINE
- NISC
- Scopus
