= Alison Paterson (company director) =

New Zealand businesswoman

Dame Alison Paterson DNZM OBE QSO
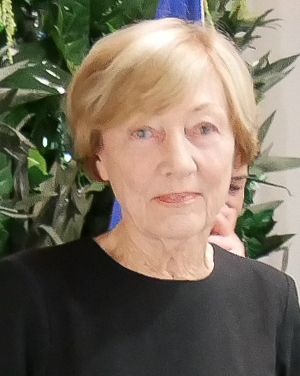
- Paterson in 2020
- Born: Alison Mae Glennie; 22 August 1935 (age 90); Taumarunui, New Zealand
- Occupations: Chartered accountant; professional company director
- Known for: First woman to serve on the board of a publicly listed company in New Zealand
- Spouses: 1. Alan John Dinsdale (m. c. 1956, div.); 2. Barry Paterson (m. 1991)

Dame Alison Mae Paterson DNZM QSO (formerly Dinsdale, née Glennie; born 22 August 1935) is a New Zealand businesswoman. In 1979, she became the first woman to sit on the board of a publicly listed company in New Zealand.

== Early life and family ==
Paterson was born Alison Mae Glennie at Taumarunui on 22 August 1935. She was educated at New Plymouth Girls' High School, and became deaf towards the end of her schooling, although this was subsequently largely resolved through a series of operations.

In about 1956, she married Alan John Dinsdale, but they later divorced. In 1991, she married lawyer Barry John Paterson. He was appointed Queen's Counsel in 1993, and served as a High Court judge between 1996 and 2004.

== Career ==
After leaving school, Glennie worked as the petty-cash girl for an accountancy firm, and studied accounting by correspondence. She qualified as a chartered accountant in 1966, and established her own farm accounting practice in 1971.

In 1976, Alison Dinsdale was appointed as a member of the Apple and Pear Marketing Board, becoming the first woman to be appointed to a producer board in New Zealand. Three years later, in 1979, she was the first woman to serve on the board of a New Zealand publicly listed company when she joined the board of retail chain McKenzies. She has gone on to serve on numerous company boards. She spent 15 years on the board of the Reserve Bank of New Zealand and has chaired entities including Landcorp, the Waitematā District Health Board, Farm IQ Systems, Kiwi Wealth, the Forestry Industry Safety Council, and Albano Healthcare Group. Other company boards on which she has sat include Vector, Stevenson Agriculture, New Zealand Formulary, Transpower New Zealand and Crown Irrigation Investments. She has also served on the Massey University Council.

== Honours and awards ==
In the 2000 New Year Honours, Alison Paterson was appointed a Companion of the Queen's Service Order for public services. In the 2010 Queen's Birthday Honours, she was made a Companion of the New Zealand Order of Merit, for services to business, and she was promoted to Dame Companion of the New Zealand Order of Merit in the 2014 New Year Honours.

In 2009, Paterson was conferred an honorary Doctor of Commerce degree by Massey University. The following year, she was named the Top 200 QBE Insurance chairperson of the year, and in 2015 she was inducted into the New Zealand Business Hall of Fame. In 2018, she was recognised for her contribution to business and finance at the New Zealand CFO Awards, and in 2020, she won the board and management award at the New Zealand Women of Influence Awards. Also in 2020, she was awarded honorary life membership of Global Women.
