= Pat Higgins (businessman) =

New Zealand businessman and philanthropist

Sir Pat Higgins KNZM
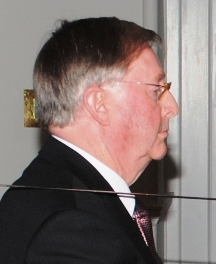
- Higgins in 2011
- Born: Daniel Patrick Higgins; 1937 or 1938 (age 86–87); Christchurch, New Zealand
- Occupation: Businessman
- Known for: Chairman of Higgins Group; Philanthropy
- Spouse: Kay Johnson (died 2012)

Sir Daniel Patrick Higgins KNZM (born 1937 or 1938) is a New Zealand businessman and philanthropist. He was the chairman of the Palmerston North-based construction firm, Higgins Group, until it was sold to Fletcher Building in 2016.

== Early life and family ==
Higgins was born in Christchurch in about 1938, the son of Phyllis and Irish-born Dan Higgins. The family moved to Palmerston North in 1947, where Dan Higgins founded what became the Higgins Group in 1951. Pat Higgins married his wife, Jennifer Kay Johnson, in about 1962, and the couple went on to have four children.

== Career ==
After leaving school, Higgins gained experience working with the family company's road crews, before moving to work in the management side of the business, and rising to become company chairman. The company grew to employ over 1700 staff, and was sold to Fletcher Building in 2016 for $315 million.

== Philanthropy ==
Higgins began donating to community groups, sporting bodies and charities in the Manawatū in the 1980s. In 2016, it was reported that Higgins and the Higgins Group supported over 100 organisations annually. Groups that have received significant support include the Manawatū Cancer Society, Arohanui Hospice, the Manawatū Turbos rugby union team, and Manfeild Park. For many years, Higgins and EziBuy founder Gerard Gillispie gave $25,000 annually to the Manawatū rugby academy, and Higgins contributed $250,000 to the 2009 "Save the Turbos" campaign.

== Honours and awards ==
In the 2005 Queen's Birthday Honours, Higgins was appointed an Officer of the New Zealand Order of Merit, for services to business and the community. He was promoted to Knight Companion of the New Zealand Order of Merit, for services to philanthropy and the community, in the 2011 Queen's Birthday Honours.

In 2007, Higgins was named Manawatū sports personality of the year, and in 2012 he was inducted into the New Zealand Business Hall of Fame.

== Later life ==
Higgins' wife, Kay, Lady Higgins, died in November 2012.
