= Trevor Clarke (lawyer) =

Cook Islands lawyer, businessman and public servant (born 1942)

Sir Trevor Clarke KBE
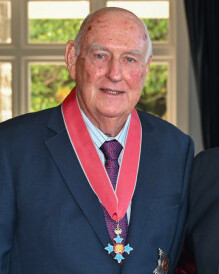
- Clarke in 2026
- Born: Trevor Charles Clarke; 1942 (age 83–84); New Zealand
- Occupations: Lawyer; businessman; public servant

Sir Trevor Charles Clarke KBE (born 1942) is a Cook Islands lawyer, businessman, and public servant. He is known as the "father of the Cook Islands tax haven".

Clarke was born in 1942 in New Zealand, and moved to the Cook Islands in 1966. He worked as assistant advocate general and later advocate general from 1966 to 1978. In 1998, he became majority shareholder and chief executive of the Cook Islands Trading Corporation. He is also a director of Island Hotels Limited. He has previously served as president of the Cook Islands Law Society and the Cook Islands Chamber of Commerce.

Clarke was a key figure in the establishment of the Cook Islands as a tax haven in the 1980s, founding the Cook Islands Trust Corporation in 1981, and later becoming a co-founder of the European Pacific Group, the company at the centre of the Winebox Inquiry in New Zealand. During the inquiry he worked as international financial advisor to Cook Islands prime minister Geoffrey Henry, and he was later appointed chair of the Financial Supervisory Commission, responsible for overseeing the offshore finance industry. He stepped down in 2010. He was named as a tax haven client in the Offshore Leaks database.

Clarke was appointed a Knight Commander of the Order of the British Empire, for services to business and tourism, in the 2025 King's Birthday Honours.
