= Nigel Roberts =

Nigel Roberts may refer to:

- Nigel Roberts (computer scientist), one of the original members of the Internet Corporation for Assigned Names and Numbers (ICANN)
- Nigel Roberts (political scientist) (born 1944), New Zealand academic and mountaineer
