= Helen Anderson =

New Zealand scientist and public servant

Helen Anderson QSO CRSNZ
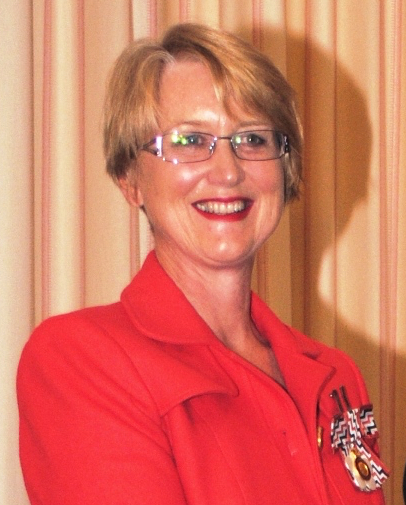
- Anderson in 2010
- Born: Helen Joan Anderson; 11 September 1955; Dunedin, New Zealand
- Education: University of Cambridge
- Scientific career
- Fields: Seismology
- Thesis: Seismotectonics of the western Mediterranean (1985)

Helen Joan Anderson QSO CRSNZ (born 11 September 1955) is a New Zealand professional director, scientist and, previously, public servant. She currently serves as a director on a number of boards and is a Chartered Fellow of the Institute of Directors (CFInstD).

== Early life and family ==
Anderson was born in Dunedin on 11 September 1955, the daughter of Patricia and Atherton Anderson.

Anderson was educated at Columba College, and then studied at the University of Auckland, graduating with a BSc(Hons). She later undertook doctoral studies at the University of Cambridge, gaining a PhD in 1985.

== Professional career ==
Anderson is currently, or has previously been, chair of the Board of BRANZ, Studio Pacific Architecture, Scion and Fulbright NZ, a director at Antarctica New Zealand, NIWA, Dairy NZ and ClearPoint Ltd. Other roles held have been on the councils of Massey University (as Pro-Chancellor), the Institute of Directors New Zealand and Nature Conservancy Aotearoa NZ.

Anderson is a seismologist with expertise in the mechanics of large earthquakes and chaired the expert panel convened to investigate the performance of Statistics House in the 2016 Kaikōura earthquake.

From 1997 to 2003 she was the Chief Science Advisor at the Ministry of Research, Science and Technology. She was then the Chief Executive of the Ministry from 2003 to April 2010.

== Honours ==
In 1993, Anderson was awarded the New Zealand Suffrage Centennial Medal. She was appointed a Companion of the Queen's Service Order in the 2010 Queen's Birthday Honours, for services to the Ministry of Science, Research and Technology. Anderson is a Companion of the Royal Society of New Zealand (CRSNZ), and Patron of Wing 297 NZ Police Recruits and the NZ International Science Festival.
