= Derek Round =

New Zealand journalist and war correspondent

Derek Round MNZM
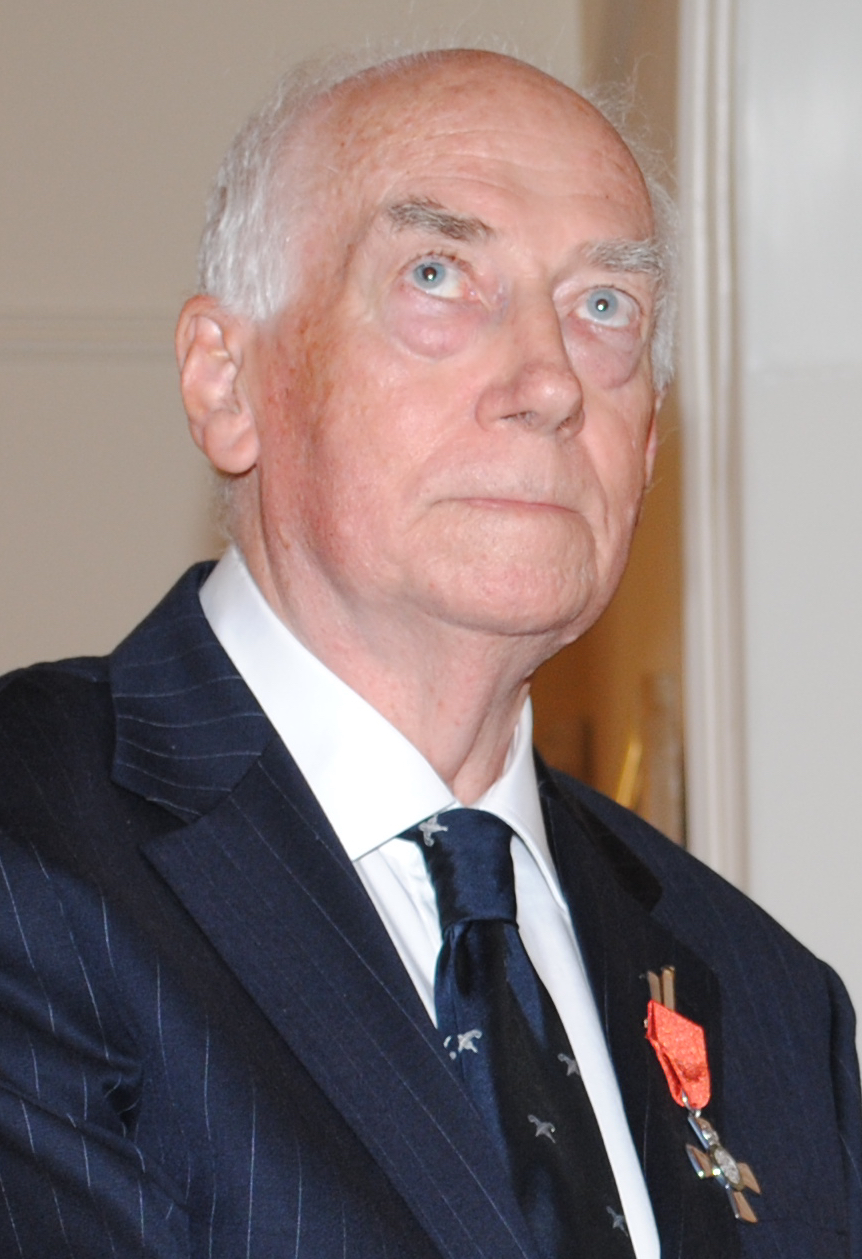
- Round in 2010
- Born: 23 February 1935
- Died: 16 May 2012 (aged 77); Whanganui, New Zealand
- Occupations: Journalist, war correspondent

Derek Leonard Round MNZM (23 February 1935 – 16 May 2012) was a New Zealand journalist and Vietnam War correspondent.

== Career ==
Round's media career started in mid 1950s when he was working as an editor for Canta, the Canterbury University student newspaper. He graduated from Canterbury University as a law graduate but had worked in journalism at the Parker-Hulme murder trial in 1975 as a 19-year-old legal intern, and continued in that career. In 1960 he started as the bureau chief for Reuters, the international news agency, in Singapore and Hong Kong. From 1973 to 1977 he worked as an Asia correspondent for the New Zealand Press Association (NZPA) in Singapore and Hong Kong. Later on he started working at the parliamentary press gallery as a political editor, also at NZPA. His roles also included London bureau chief and editor, which he worked as for five years, from 1984 and on.

In 1976 Round accompanied New Zealand Prime Minister Rob Muldoon on a visit to China.

Round was one of the few journalists selected to attend the wedding of Charles, Prince of Wales, and Lady Diana Spencer in 1981.

Round was one of the most distinguished journalists in New Zealand and he gained a reputation for being a successful "gung-ho" reporter from his work in war zones. In the 2010 Queen's Birthday Honours, Round was appointed a Member of the New Zealand Order of Merit, for services to journalism.

It has also been claimed that Round worked as a spy for the SIS after the Soviet Union contacted him. This was told by Martin Round who is Derek's cousin.

His published works include the book "Barbed Wire Between Us" (July 15, 2002, Random House New Zealand, 189 pages).

== Death ==
Round was murdered in the living room of his own home in Whanganui. His body was found on the morning of 17 May 2012. Police described his death as violent, reporting as follows: "Although I can't go into details at this stage the results would indicate a horrific attack on Derek, which took place in the living room of his home", Detective Senior Sergeant Dave Kirby of Whanguanui CIB said. Inquiries are continuing. Later it was announced that Derek died due to several violent blows to the head.

In May 2012, Whanganui man Michael Umanui Werahiko, 31, was arrested and charged with Round's murder. As of November 2012, he was being held in custody after failing to win bail. His trial was set to take place in Whanganui, in July 2013. Werahiko was subsequently found guilty and sentenced to life imprisonment with a minimum period of imprisonment of 15 years. Werahiko appealed, but both appeals (against the duration and minimum duration of his term) were thrown out in the Court of Appeal in 2015.
