= David Levene (businessman) =

New Zealand businessman and philanthropist (1929–2021)

Sir David Levene KNZM OBE
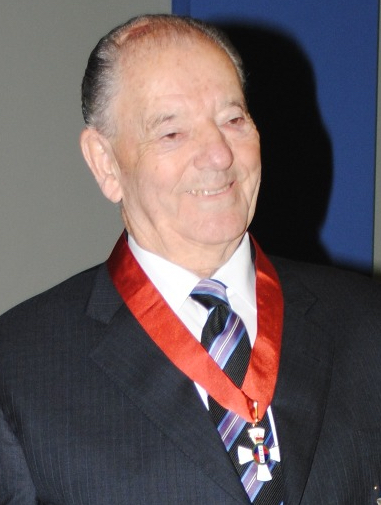
- Levene in 2010
- Born: David Raymond Levene; 19 August 1929; Ponsonby, New Zealand
- Died: 11 August 2021 (aged 91); Takapuna, New Zealand
- Occupation: Businessman
- Spouse: Billie Arkle (m. 1960; died 2007)
- Children: Two

Sir David Raymond Levene KNZM OBE (19 August 1929 – 11 August 2021) was a New Zealand businessman and philanthropist.

== Early life and family ==
Born into a Jewish family in the Auckland suburb of Ponsonby on 19 August 1929, Levene was the son of Sybil Levene (née Feldman) and Lewis Levene, the latter having emigrated from the north of England in the 1920s. From 1943 to 1946, David Levene was educated as a boarder at New Plymouth Boys' High School. After leaving school, he initially found employment in a pharmacy, before going to work for his father and uncle in their paint shop, Levene and Co., on Auckland's Karangahape Road, in 1947.

In 1960, Levene married Alma Elizabeth "Billie" Arkle, and the couple went on to have two children.

== Business career ==
Levene took over the management of Levene and Co. in 1952, and expanded the business by opening new retail stores around Auckland and selling paint and wallpaper to contractors. He began travelling to the United States in 1959 to study retail practices, and subsequently diversified the company into hardware. He also set up a paint factory in Ōtara, with the product sold through Levene's stores. In the 1980s, the stores diversified into lifestyle products, including homewares, crockery, bedroom and bathroom products and curtains. By 1994, when it was sold to Skellerup Group, the company had grown to 52 stores nationwide, as well as wallpaper and paint factories, with one thousand staff and annual turnover of $150 million.

After selling Levene and Co., Levene established Lewis Holdings, named in honour of his father, to invest in start-up businesses, and property development and management company, Quadrant Properties.

== Philanthropy ==
Levene was involved in philanthropic causes from the 1960s, when he was one of a group of businessmen involved in discussions around the establishment of Outward Bound New Zealand. Levene and Co. sponsored students to undertake Outward Bound courses,. Through the David Levene Foundation, he donated to capital works projects at Outward Bound. Levene became a director of the Outward Bound Trust New Zealand in the early 1990s, and became patron in 2003.

Many of the causes supported by Levene were in the educational and medical fields. The David Levene Foundation co-funded a professorship in neurology at the University of Auckland, and funds bursaries for students at Massey University who would otherwise be unable to undertake university study because of financial hardship. Every year, the foundation typically donates to about 300 charities, including North Shore Hospice and the Halberg Trust. Following his wife's death from Parkinson's disease, he served as patron of Parkinson's New Zealand from 2007 until 2014.

Levene was an active member of Auckland Rotary from 1963. In 2012, he financially supported the development of golfer Lydia Ko through a donation to New Zealand Golf.

== Later life and death ==
Levene was predeceased by his wife, Billie, in 2007. He continued to play an active role in his business and philanthropic interests in his later years, and died at his home in Takapuna on 11 August 2021, at the age of 91.

== Honours and awards ==
In the 1995 Queen's Birthday Honours, Levene was appointed an Officer of the Order of the British Empire, for services to business and the community. In the 2010 Queen's Birthday Honours, he was made a Knight Companion of the New Zealand Order of Merit, also for services to business and the community.

In 1995, Levene was conferred with an honorary Doctor of Literature degree by Massey University, and in 2014, he received an honorary Doctor of Laws degree from the University of Auckland. He was inducted into the New Zealand Business Hall of Fame in 2006.
