= Yves Carcelle =

French businessman (1948–2014)

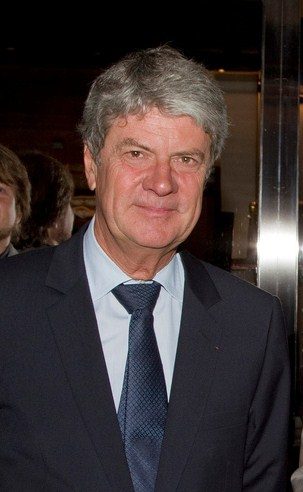
Carcelle in September 2010.

Yves Carcelle (18 May 1948 – 31 August 2014) was a French businessman. He was the chairman and CEO of the LVMH subsidiary Louis Vuitton. He served from 1990 until 2012. He first joined Louis Vuitton in 1989 as a strategic director. Until his death, he was a LVMH executive committee member.

Carcelle was born in Paris. He graduated from both the École Polytechnique and INSEAD. He was an Officer of the Legion of Honour, and later became a knight. In the 2010 New Zealand Queen's Birthday Honours, he was appointed an honorary Member of the New Zealand Order of Merit, for services to yachting. He was married to Rebecca and had five children.

Carcelle died from kidney cancer on 31 August 2014 in Paris. He was 66.
