= Arnold Manaaki Wilson =

New Zealand painter (1928–2012)

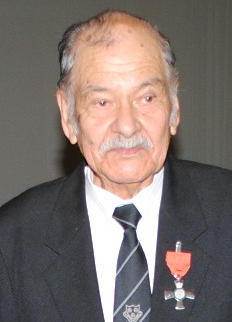
Wilson in 2010

Arnold Manaaki Wilson MNZM QSM (11 December 1928 – 1 May 2012) was a New Zealand artist and educator of Māori (Ngāi Tūhoe, Te Arawa) descent. He is regarded as a pioneer of the modern Māori art movement.

== Early life and education ==
Born in Ruatoki on 11 December 1928, Wilson was the youngest of five children born to Taiha Ngakewhi Te Wakaunua and Fredrick George Wilson. His maternal grandfather, Heteraka Te Wakaunua, was a political leader from Te Mahurehure and Ngāti Rongo hapū of the Tūhoe iwi.

Wilson was educated at the Ruatoki Native School and then won a scholarship to attend Wesley College in Auckland. He showed an interest in art from an early age and was encouraged by his teachers.

Wilson studied at the Elam School of Fine Arts at the University of Auckland. In 1955 he graduated with a Diploma of Fine Arts with first class honours in sculpture, the first Māori student to graduate from Elam. After graduating from Elam, Wilson attended Teachers Training College.

== Teaching career ==
Wilson's first teaching job was in Kawakawa at Bay of Islands College. He went on to become head of department in art at Mount Albert Grammar School. Later in life, Wilson was director of Te Mauri Pakeaka, the cross-cultural community involvement art programme at the Ministry of Education.

Wilson was part of what is known as the 'Tovey generation', so called after educator and administrator Gordon Tovey. Tovey was the Department of Education’s national supervisor of arts and crafts and he employed and trained a group of young artists including Wilson, Paratene Matchitt, Fred Graham, Muru Walters and Katerina Mataira as art advisors.

Art historian Mark Stocker notes that Wilson "sought to show young Māori artists how they could take strength from their heritage, but use both traditional Māori and European sculptural materials and methods to convey their ideas".

== Artistic career ==
Wilson is known mainly for his work as a sculptor. Along with artists such as Ralph Hotere and Sandy Adsett, Wilson experimented with blending Maori and European artistic traditions. Wilson employed both traditional and non-traditional materials, working with wood, metal and vivid paint colours. Art historian Jonathan Mane-Wheoki wrote that his work as a sculptor "reflected his Māori upbringing while also drawing on the stripped-down forms of early-20th-century European modernism".

Arnold had a long exhibiting career, in New Zealand and internationally. A pivotal early exhibition was held at the University of Auckland’s Adult Education Centre in June 1958, where Wilson showed work with four other teachers: Hotere, Mataira, Walters and Selwyn Wilson. They worked in Northland. Mane-Wheoki identifies this as "the first exhibition of work by modern Māori artists adapting the styles of contemporary European modernism".

Important exhibitions featuring Wilson's work include:

- Recent New Zealand Sculpture (1968) Auckland City Art Gallery,
- Ten Māori Artists (1978) Manawatu Art Gallery (now Te Manawa)
- Haongia te Taonga (1986) Waikato Museum
- Kohia Ko Taikaka Anake (1990) National Art Gallery, Wellington (now Te Papa)
- Te Waka Toi: Contemporary Māori Art from New Zealand (1992) a touring exhibition that travelled in the United States
- Arnold Manaaki Wilson: Pou Ihi | Pou Whenua | Pou Tangata (2014) Auckland Art Gallery

== Honours and awards ==
- 1991 – Queen's Service Medal for public services, in the 1991 New Year Honours
- 2001 – Te Tohu Toi Kē Award from Te Waka Toi for new directions in contemporary Māori art
- 2007 – Arts Foundation Icon Award in 2007
- 2008 – Honorary doctorate from AUT University, acknowledging his work in education and the arts
- 2010 – Member of the New Zealand Order of Merit for services to Māori and the arts, in the Queen’s Birthday Honours

== Death ==
Wilson died in Auckland on 1 May 2012.
