= 2010 Birthday Honours (New Zealand) =

Awards list for New Zealand

2010 Queen's Birthday Honours
- Previous: 2010 New Year Honours; Next: 2011 New Year Honours
- Type: New Zealand royal honours: New Zealand Order of Merit; Queen's Service Order; Queen's Service Medal; Distinguished Service Decoration
- Date: 7 June 2010
- Country: New Zealand

Highlights
- Total recipients: 172

The 2010 Queen's Birthday Honours in New Zealand, celebrating the official birthday of Queen Elizabeth II, were appointments made by the Queen in her right as Queen of New Zealand, on the advice of the New Zealand government, to various orders and honours to reward and highlight good works by New Zealanders. They were announced on 7 June 2010.

The recipients of honours are listed here as they were styled before their new honour.

== New Zealand Order of Merit ==
=== Dame Companion (DNZM) ===
- Temuranga Batley-Jackson QSO JP – of Manukau. For services to Māori.
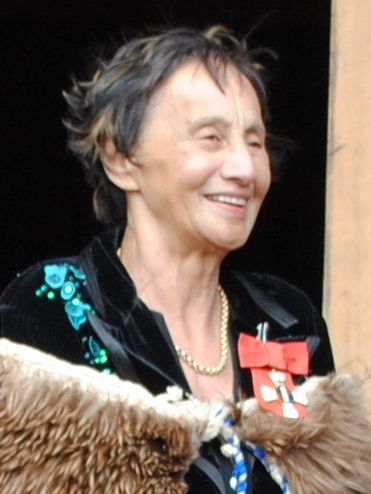
Dame June Jackson

=== Knight Companion (KNZM) ===
- Frederick Richard Allen OBE – of Whangaparāoa. For services to rugby.
- Graeme Bruce Douglas MNZM – of Auckland. For services to philanthropy and athletics.
- Peter Charles Leitch QSM – of Manukau. For services to business and philanthropy.
- David Raymond Levene OBE – of North Shore City. For services to business and the community.
- Richard Leslie Taylor ONZM – of Wellington. For services to film.

Additional

- The Honourable John Hugh Williams – of Waitakere. For services as a judge.
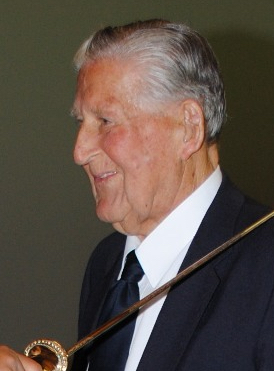
Sir Fred Allen

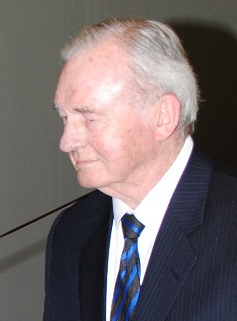
Sir Graeme Douglas

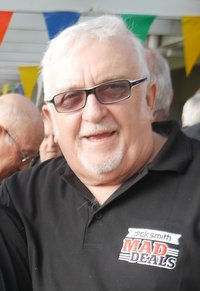
Sir Peter Leitch

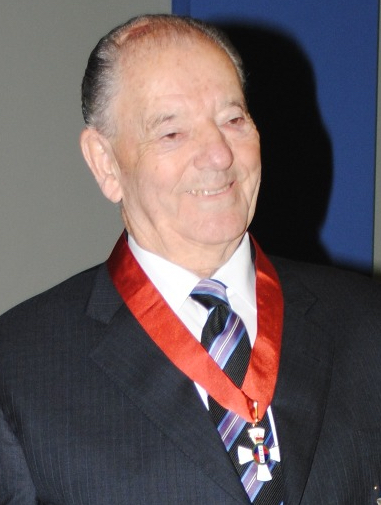
Sir David Levene

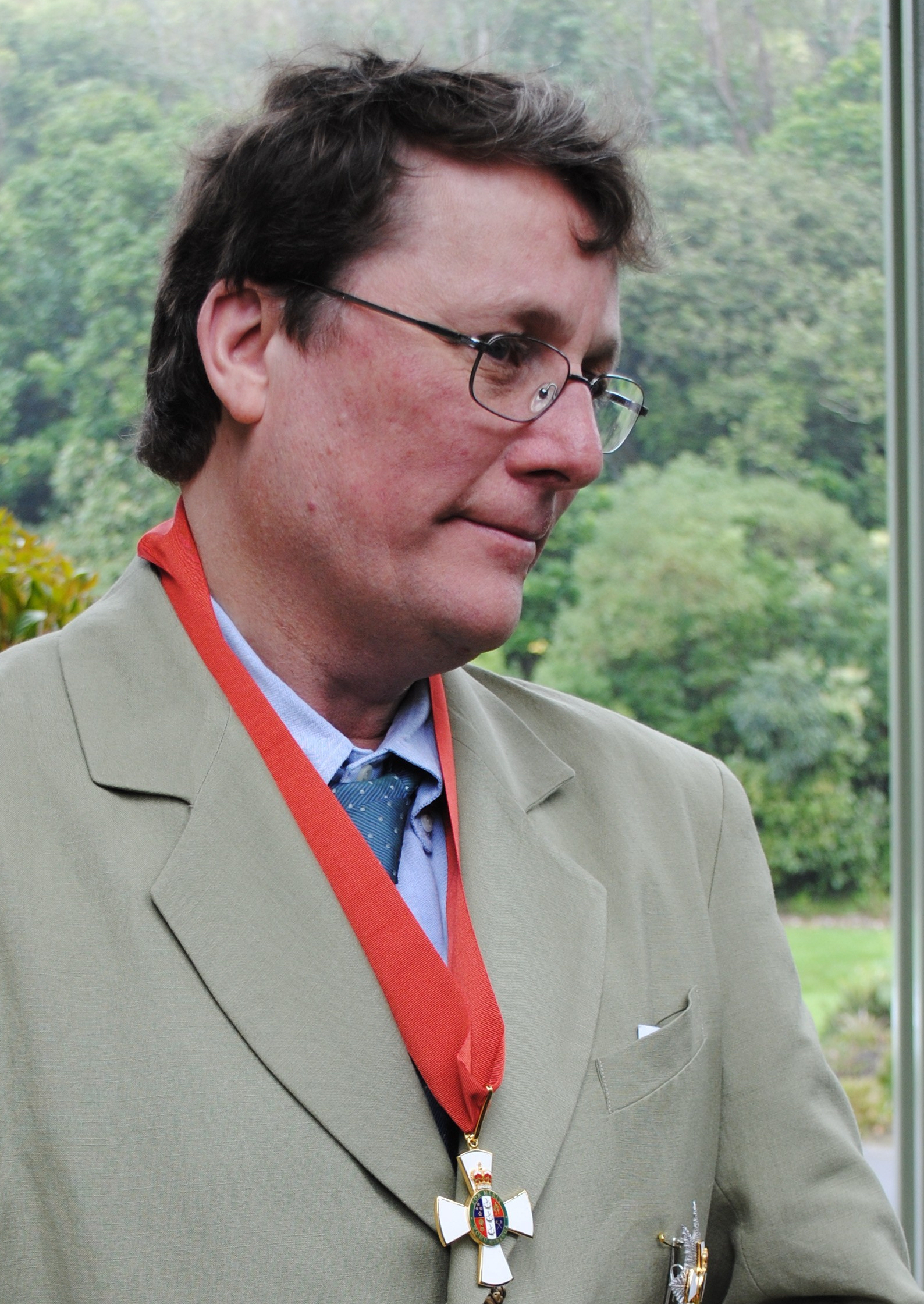
Sir Richard Taylor

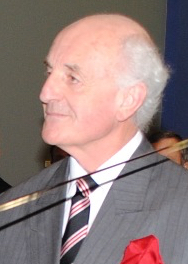
Sir Hugh Williams

=== Companion (CNZM) ===
- Jan Cameron – of Hobart, Tasmania, Australia. For services to business and philanthropy.
- Thomas Francis Doocey – of Christchurch. For services to rugby.
- Jeanette Mary Fitzsimons – of Thames. For public services.
- Michael Friedlander – of Auckland. For services to the community.
- Henry Michael Horton – of Auckland. For services to philanthropy.
- Samuel Percival Maitland Hunt QSM – of Northland. For services to poetry.
- Dr Hylton LeGrice OBE – of Auckland. For services to ophthalmology, music and the community.
- Alison Mae Paterson QSO – of Auckland. For services to business.
- Kevin William George Rimmington JP – of New Plymouth. For services to banking and the community.
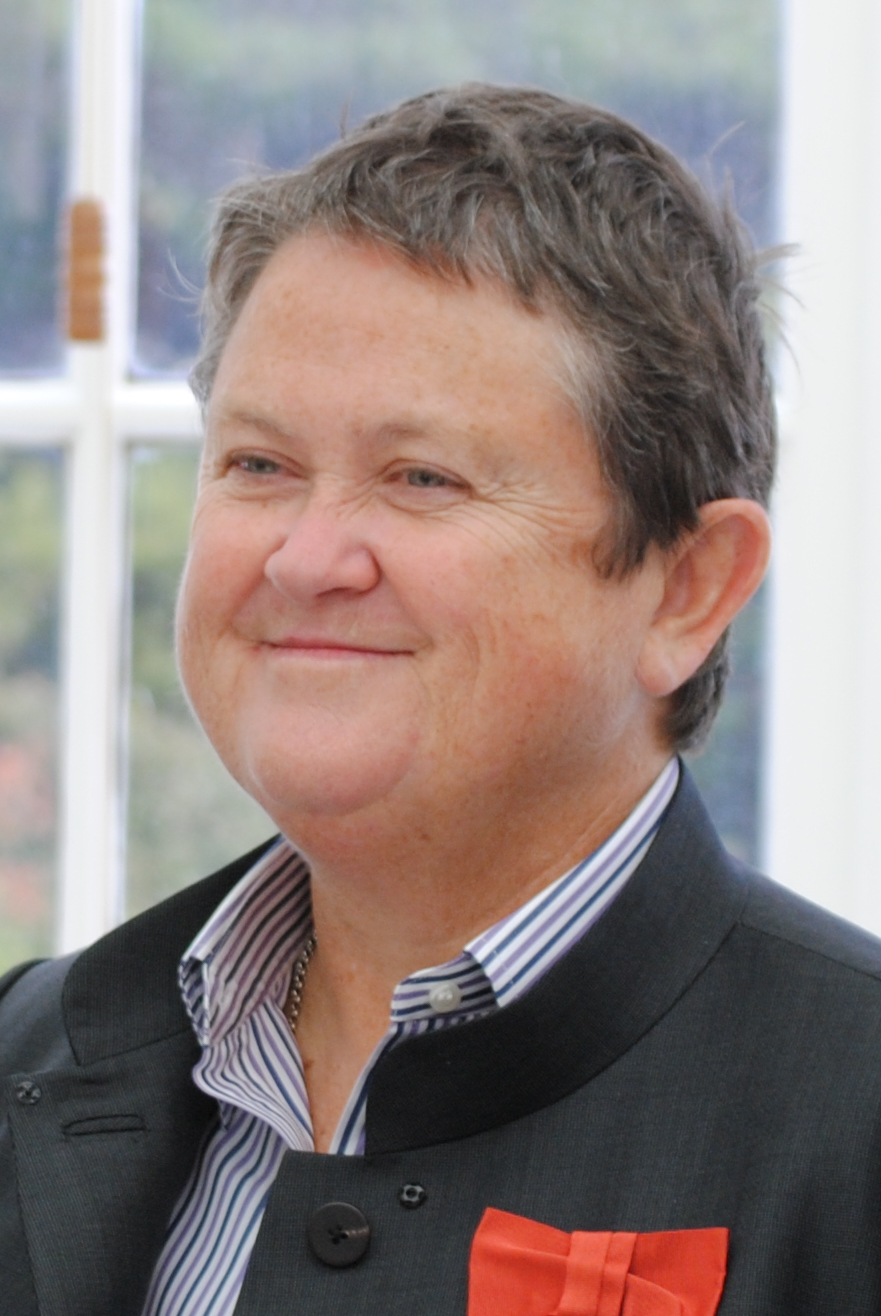
Jan Cameron

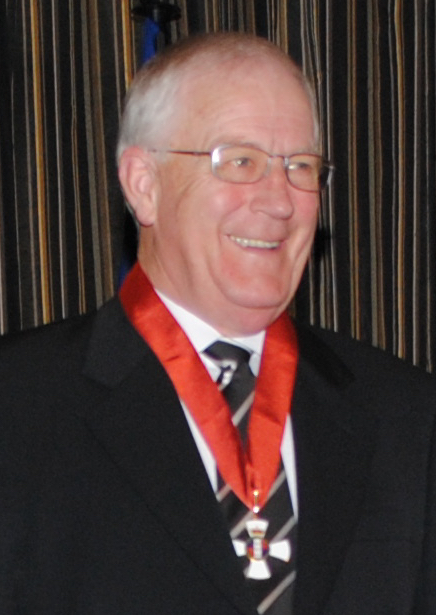
Tom Doocey

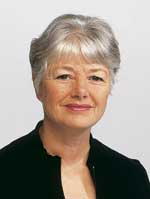
Jeanette Fitzsimons

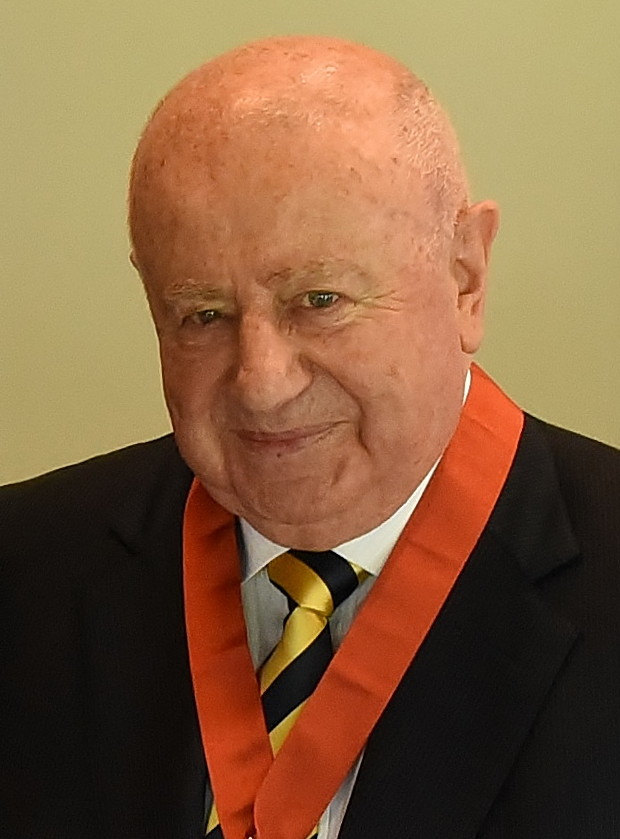
Michael Friedlander

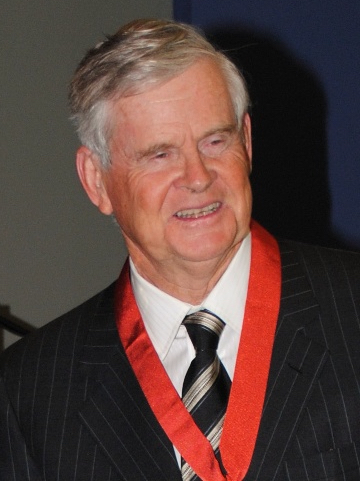
Michael Horton

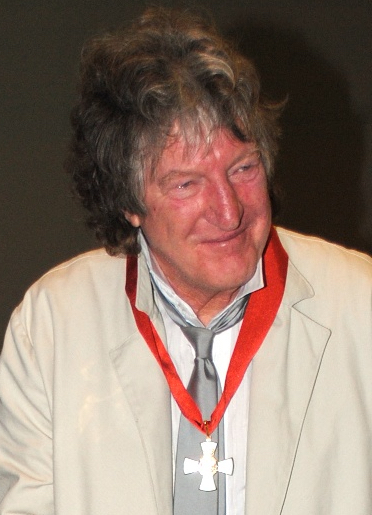
Sam Hunt

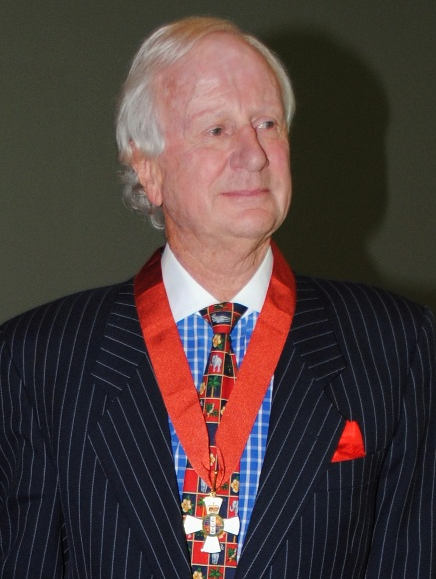
Hylton LeGrice

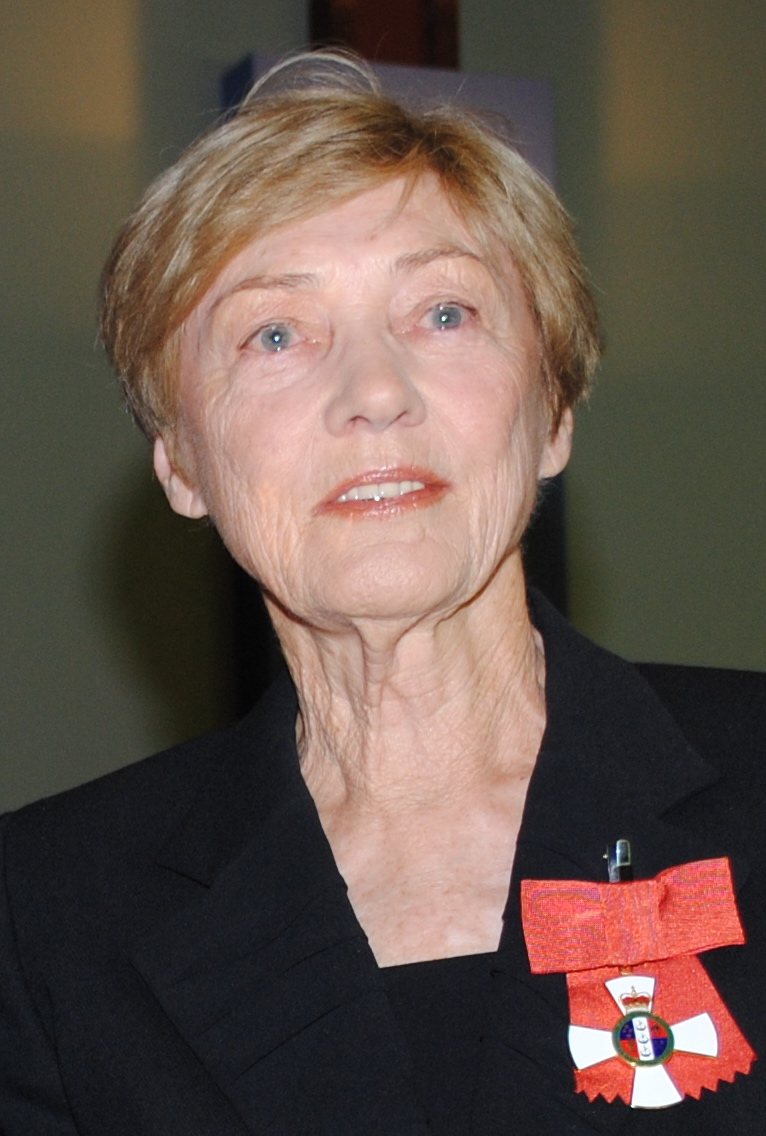
Alison Paterson

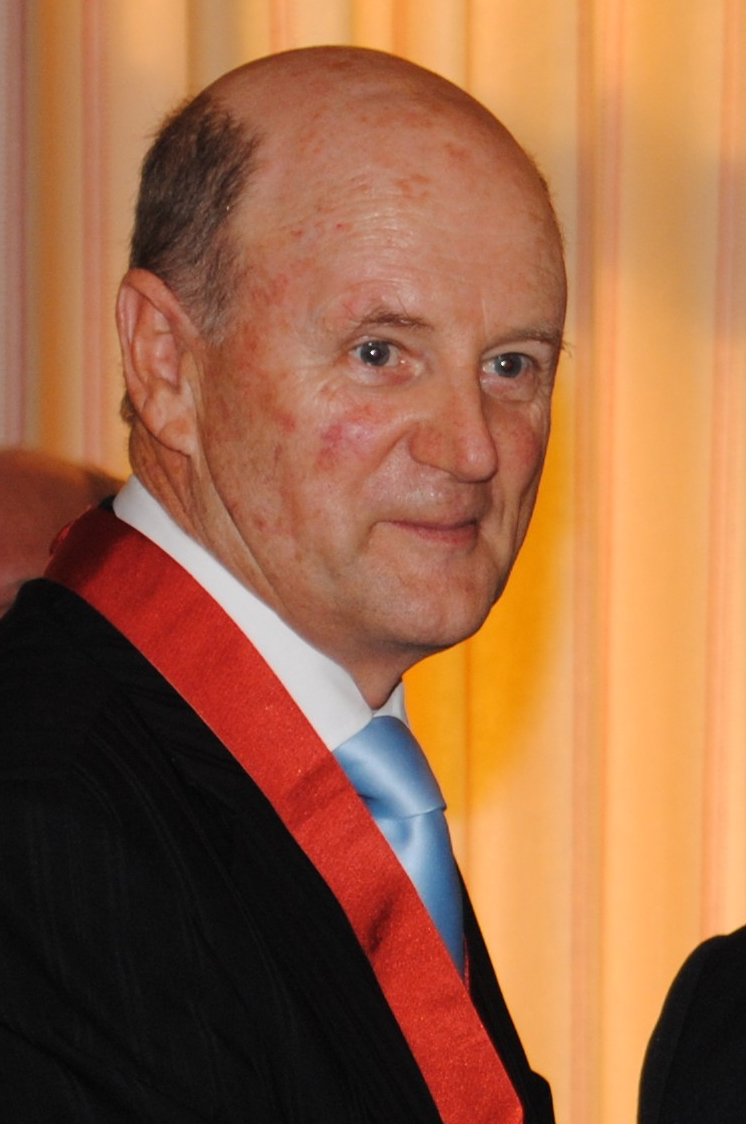
Kevin Rimmington

=== Officer (ONZM) ===
- Alan Freeman Abel JP – of Tauranga. For services to business and the community.
- Pita Shand Alexander – of Christchurch. For services to agriculture.
- Dr Richard Collingwood Fenwick – of Christchurch. For services to engineering.
- Nigel James Gould JP – of Wellington. For services to business and the community.
- June Airini Grant – of Rotorua. For services to Māori art and Māori.
- Alan William Joseph Hampton – of Ashburton. For services to equestrian sport.
- Thomas George Henderson – of Pleasant Point. For services to the community.
- Keith Harold Lawrence – of Wellington. For services to rugby.
- Maurice Edward Mahoney – of Christchurch. For services to architecture.
- Colin William McColl – of Auckland. For services to the theatre, film and television.
- David Alan Middleton – of Wellington. For services to the Earthquake Commission.
- Dr Stuart Alan Middleton – of Auckland. For services to education.
- Professor Nigel Somerset Roberts – of Wellington. For services to education.
- Dr Jonathan Edward Simon – of North Shore City. For services to medicine.
- Robert Jules Tapper – of Queenstown. For services to aviation and tourism.
- Anthony Charles Timpson – of Auckland. For services to business and the community.
- Ian Curtis Wedde – of Wellington. For services to art and literature.
- Dr Leona Fay Wilson – of Wellington. For services to medicine, in particular anaesthesia.
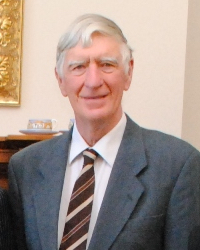
Richard Fenwick

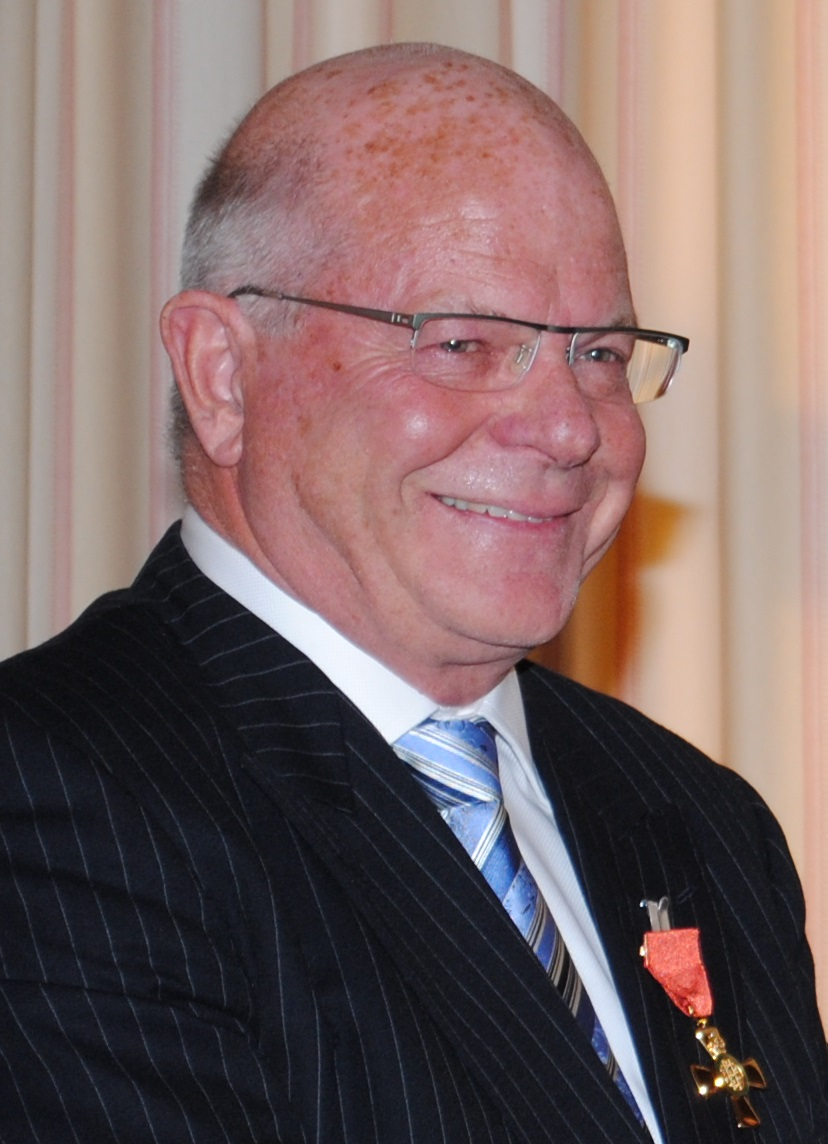
Nigel Gould

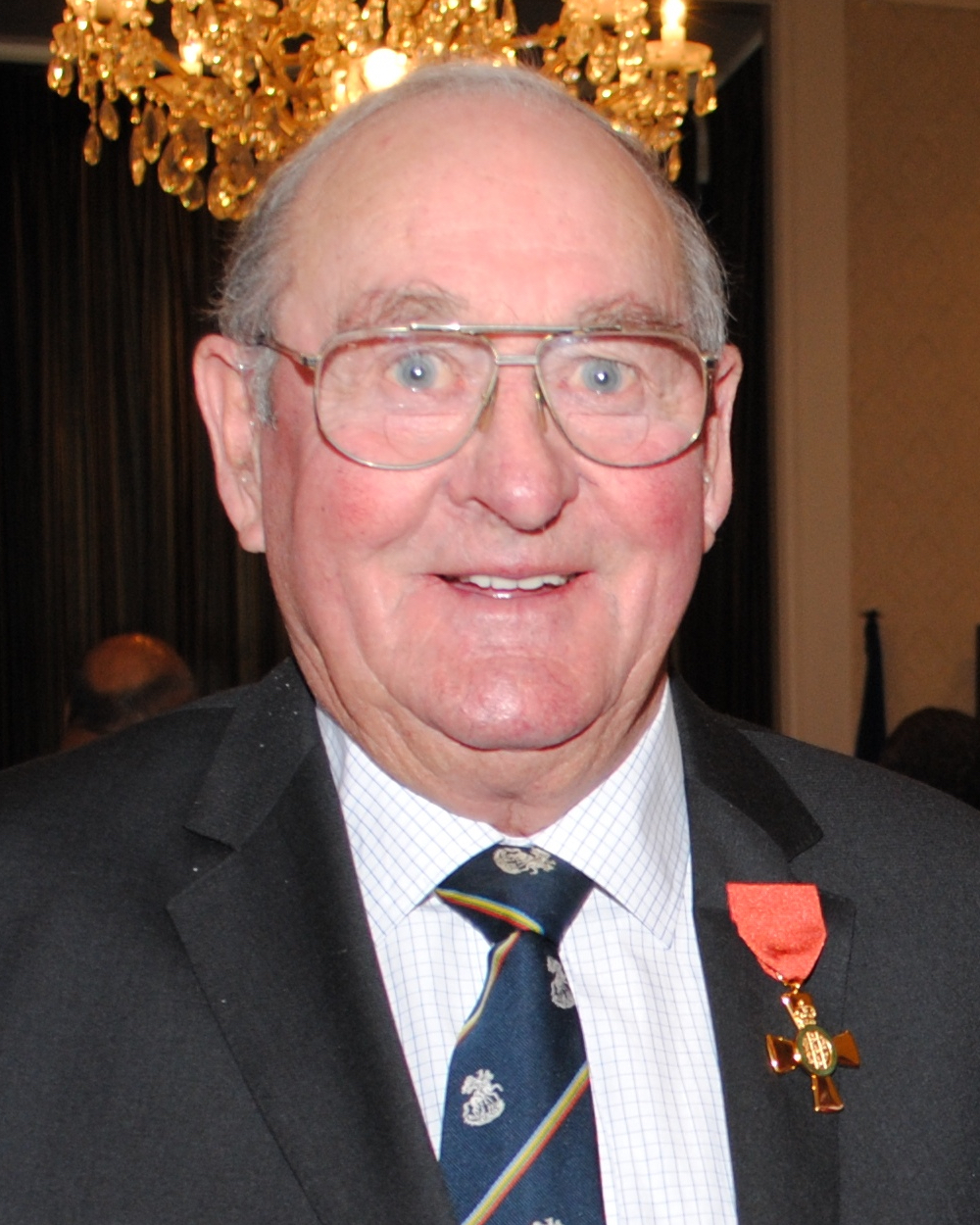
Alan Hampton

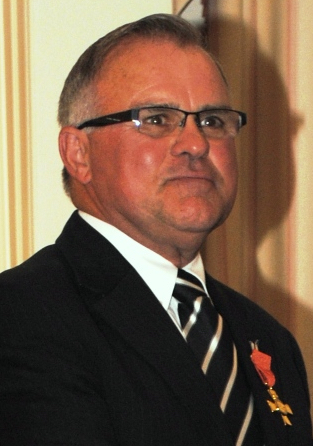
Keith Lawrence

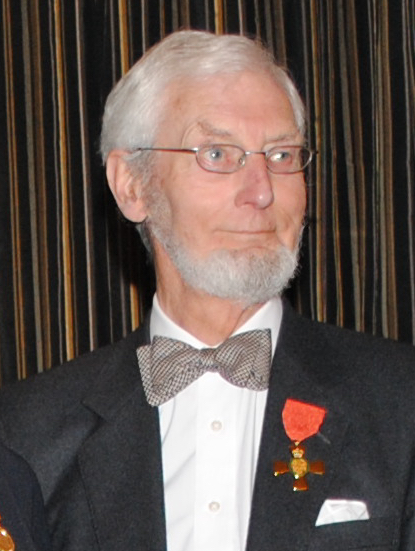
Maurice Mahoney

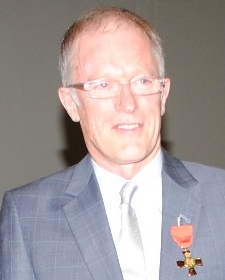
Colin McColl

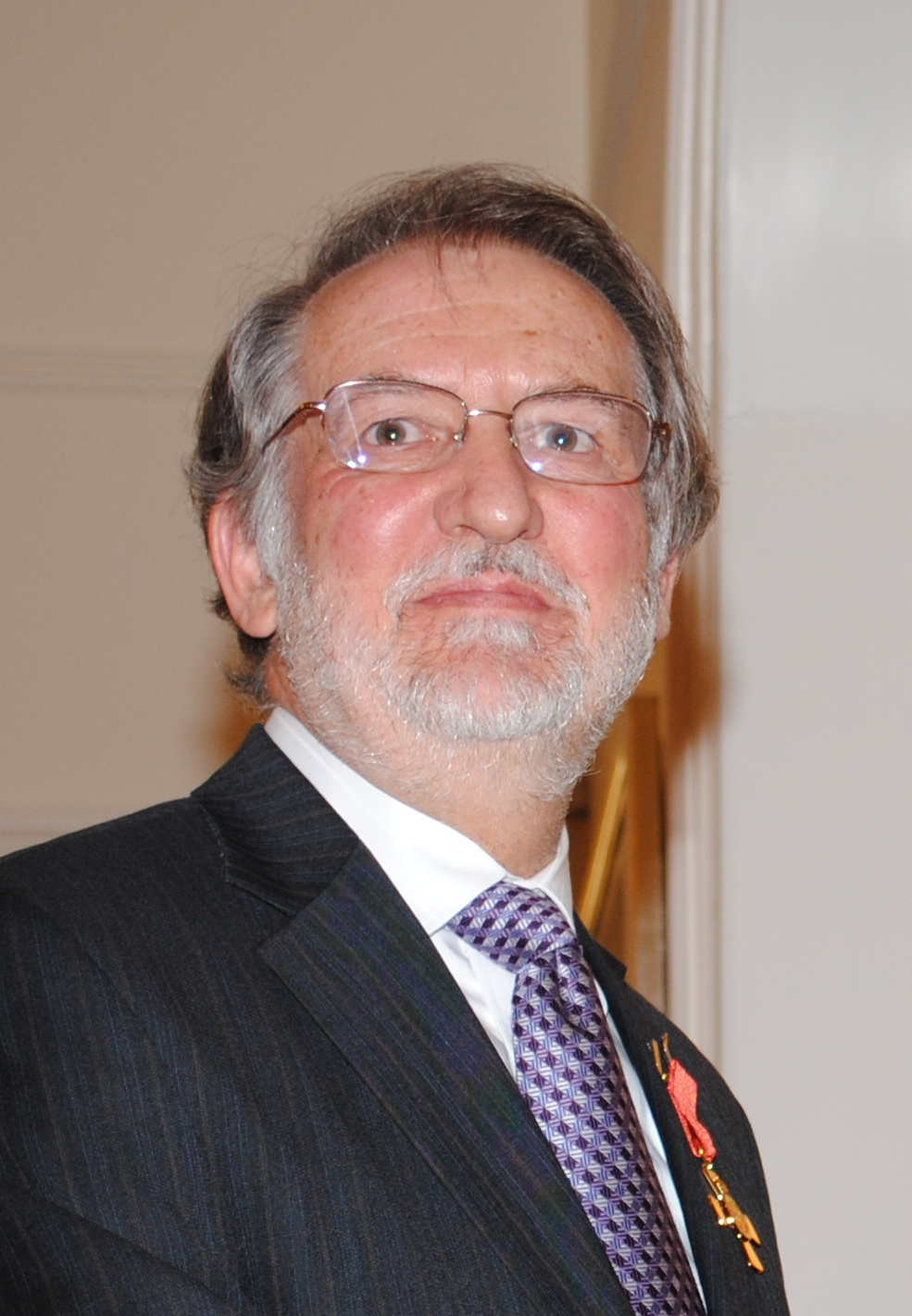
David Middleton

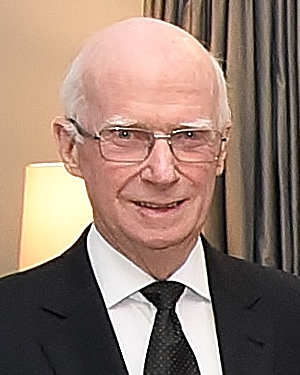
Stuart Middleton

Nigel Roberts

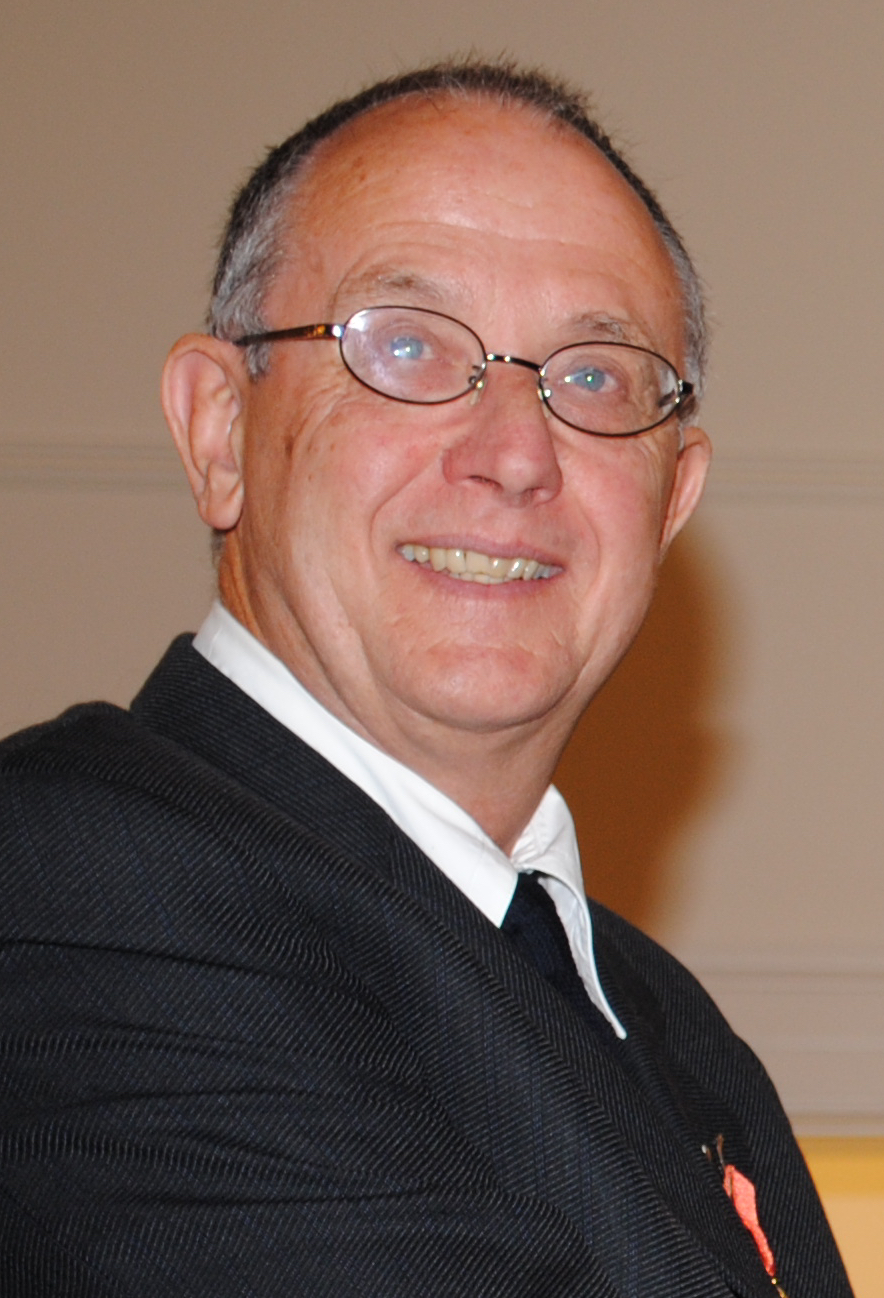
Ian Wedde

=== Member (MNZM) ===
- Dr Francis Agnew – of North Shore City. For services to the Pacific Islands community.
- Andris Apse – of Ōkārito. For services to photography.
- Kevin Henry Atkinson – of Havelock North. For services to business and the community.
- Kevin Percy Berkahn – of Auckland. For services to fashion and the community.
- Allan Neil Brodie – of Nelson. For services to volleyball.
- Dr Arnold Max Bryant – of Hamilton. For services to the dairy industry.
- Cheung Choi Chan – of Manukau. For services to the Chinese community.
- Peter Charleton JP – of New Plymouth. For services to the community.
- John Rogers Chibnall – of Haruru. For services to recreational fishing and marine research.
- Vivien Anne Chisholm – of Christchurch. For services to music.
- Geoffrey John Clatworthy JP – of Auckland. For services to the community.
- Mervyn Josiah Craw JP – of Palmerston North. For services to the community.
- John Cameron Cullen – of Auckland. For services to medicine.
- Douglas Napier Eckhoff – of Lower Hutt. For services to film.
- Taiwhanake Roy Eru Morehu JP – of Rotorua. For services to Māori.
- Donald Thomas Ferguson – of Ōtorohanga. For services to cattle-breeding and the dairy industry.
- Pamela Ellen Findlay – of Wellington. For services to marching.
- John Martin Foster JP – of North Shore City. For services to yachting.
- David Patrick Gallaher – of Palmerston North. For services to music.
- John Keith Hargraves – of Timaru. For services to organ restoration.
- Professor Terry Robin Healy – of Hamilton. For services to science.
- June Te Raumangi Jackson – of Wellington. For services to the community.
- Samuel Poutu Jackson – of Wellington. For services to the community.
- Squadron Leader James Robert Jennings – Royal New Zealand Air Force, of Palmerston North.
- Vivek Kinra – of Wellington. For services to traditional Indian dance.
- Maarten Jozef Kleintjes – of Wellington. For services to the New Zealand Police.
- Leonie Elisabeth Lawson – of Auckland. For services to music.
- Frank Richard Le Fort – of Wellington. For services to music.
- Patrick Eamonn Leonard JP – of Manukau. For services to sport, in particular boxing.
- Robert Arthur Leveloff JP – of North Shore City. For services to softball.
- Memea Eleitino Busby Ma'aelopa JP – of Christchurch. For services to the Pacific Islands community.
- John Edmond McClean JP – of Queenstown. For services to business.
- Alan Laurie Milne – of Paraparaumu. For services to the community.
- John Marsden Nankervis – of Wellington. For services to mountaineering.
- Ngawaka Haswell Grant Pirihi JP – of Whangārei. For services to Māori and the community.
- Pamela Joan Richardson JP – of Akaroa. For services to conservation and the community.
- Michael Edward Rielly – of Auckland. For services to baseball.
- Derek Leonard Round – of Masterton. For services to journalism.
- Edward John Selkirk – of Auckland. For services to photography.
- Anthony Hume Whitaker – of Motueka. For services to herpetology.
- Henry Anthony Williams – of Christchurch. For services to entertainment.
- Arnold Murray Wilson QSM – of North Shore City. For services to Māori and the arts.
- Elizabeth Lyall Wilson – of Dunedin. For services to education.
- Dr Phillip Charles Morris Yock – of Auckland. For services to astronomy.

Additional

- Lieutenant Colonel Nicholas John Gillard – Royal Regiment of New Zealand Artillery, of Esher, United Kingdom.

Honorary

- Yves Carcelle – of Paris, France. For services to yachting.
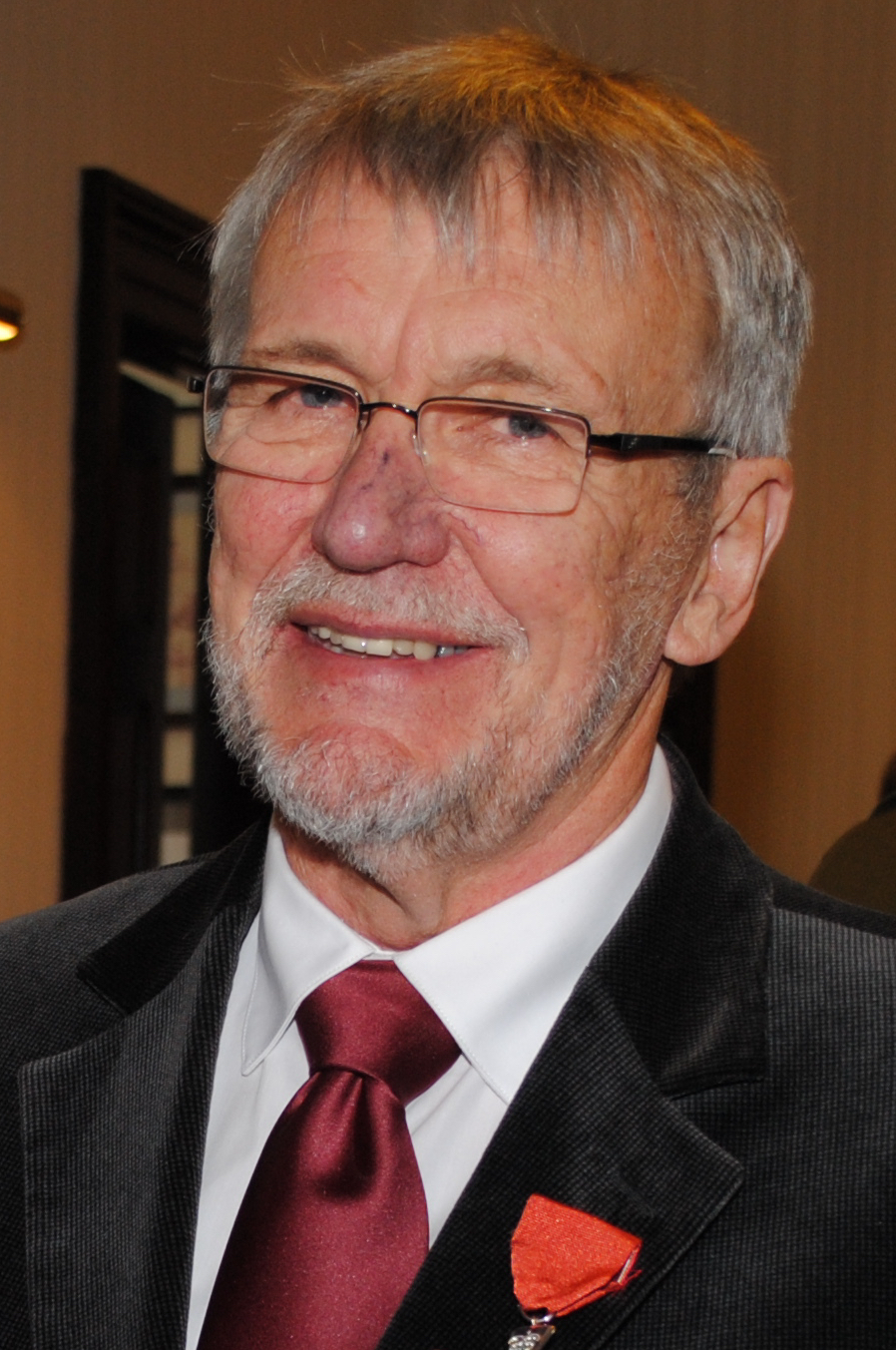
Andris Apse

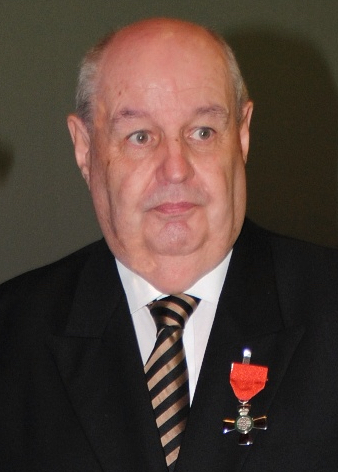
Kevin Berkahn

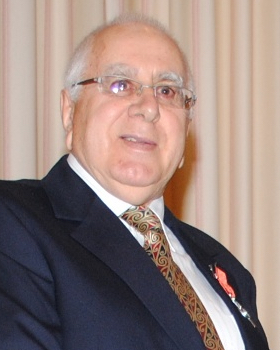
Peter Charleton

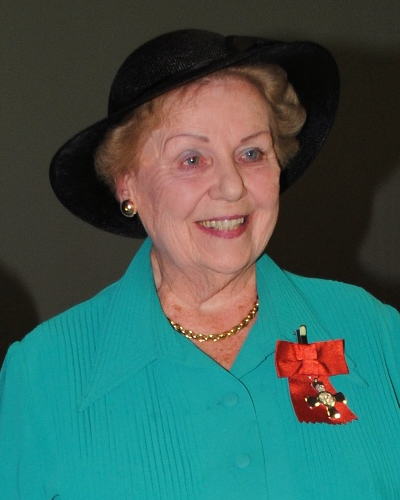
Leonie Lawson

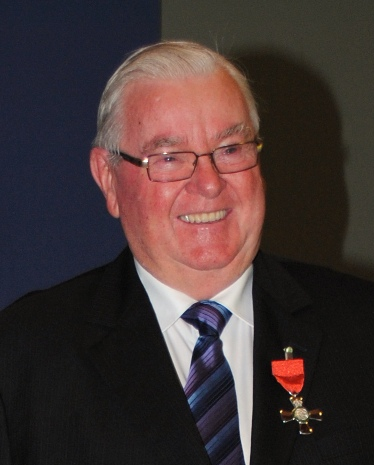
Pat Leonard

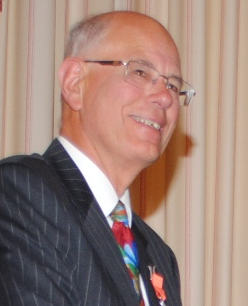
Alan Milne

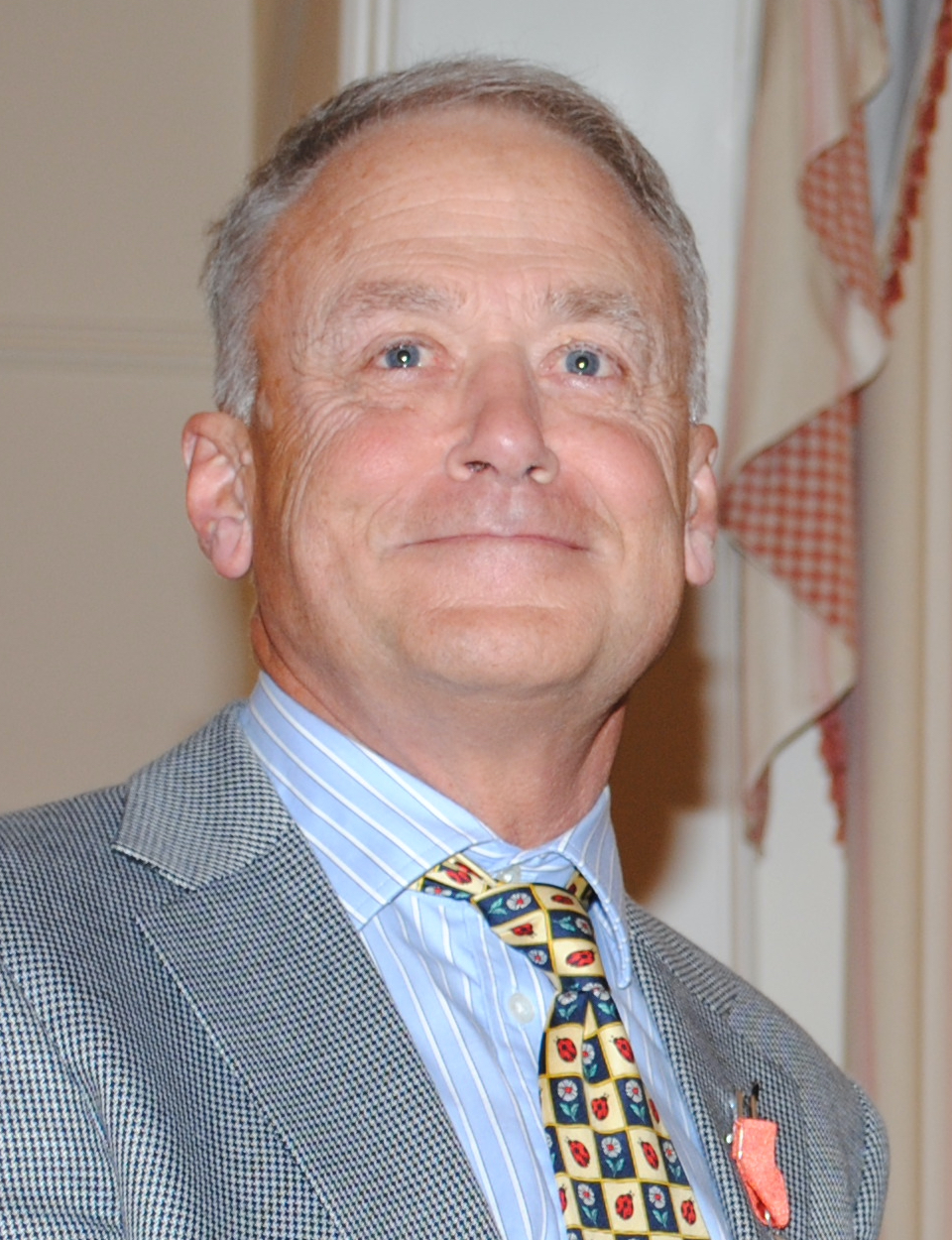
John Nankervis

Grant Pirihi

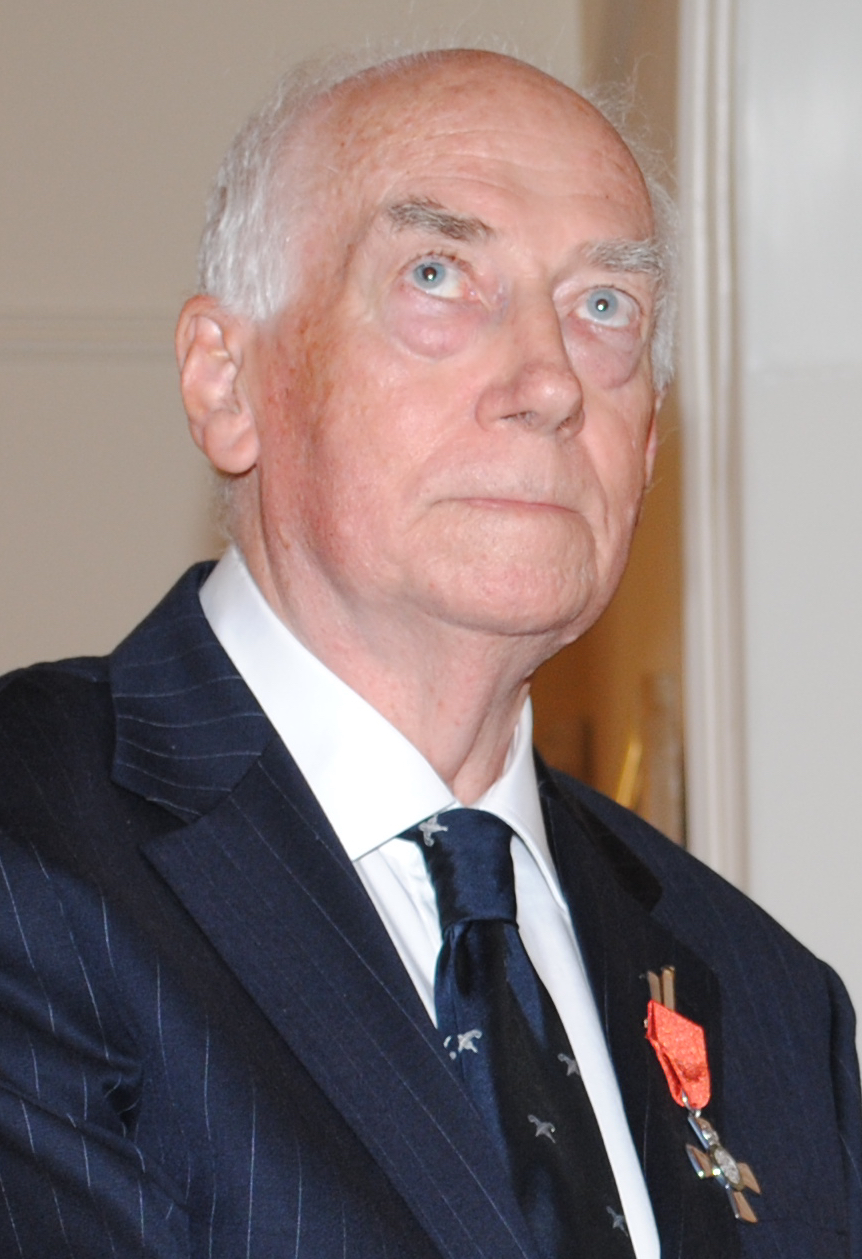
Derek Round

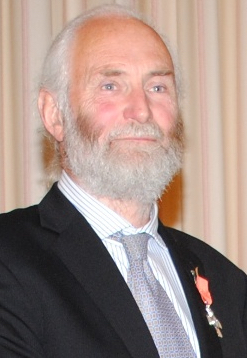
Anthony Whitaker

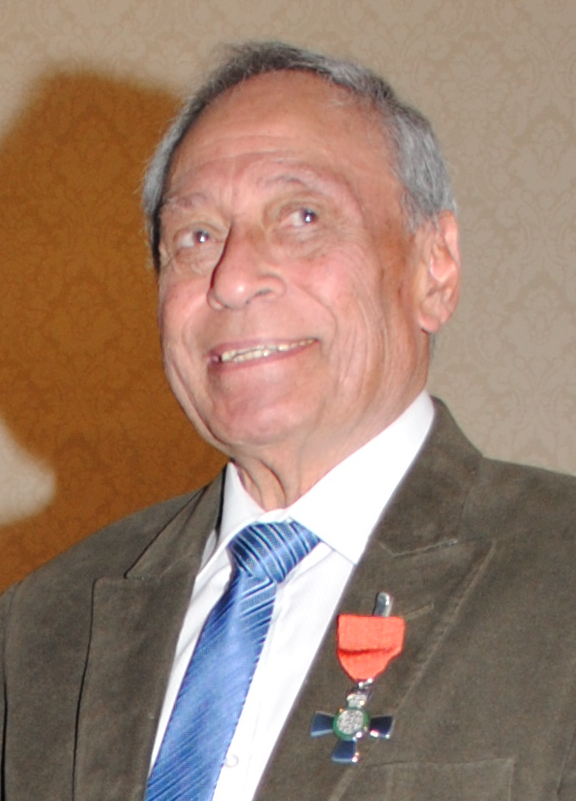
Toni Williams

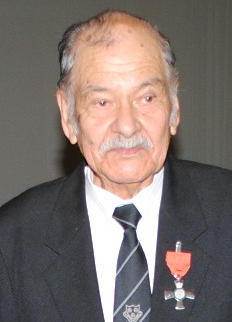
Arnold Wilson

== Companion of the Queen's Service Order (QSO) ==
- Dr Helen Joan Anderson – of Wellington. For services to the Ministry of Research, Science and Technology.
- Sandra Lorraine Coney – of Auckland. For services to women's health.
- Paul Albert Dallimore – of Christchurch. For services to the arts.
- Peter Charles Lewis Gibson – of Paraparaumu. For services to the community.
- Kura Wahirangi Kaa – of Tikitiki. For services to the restoration of historic places.
- Dr John Richard Delahunt Matthews – of Auckland. For services to medicine and the community.
- Professor John Cornelius Moorfield – of Hamilton. For services to Māori language education.
- Darcy John Nicholas – of Lower Hutt. For services to museums.
- Dr Teuila Mary Percival – of Auckland. For services to the Pacific Islands community.
- Associate Professor Susan Margaret St John – of Auckland. For services to social policy.
- Edward William Unwin – of Nelson. For services to the judiciary.
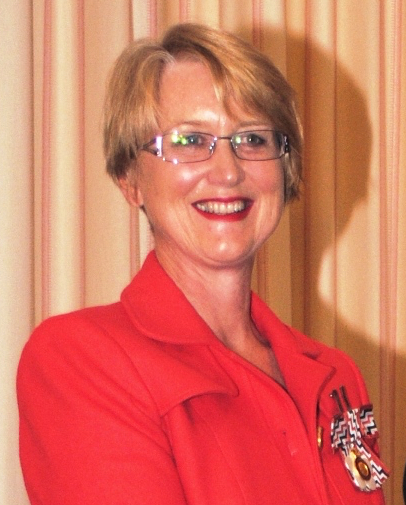
Helen Anderson

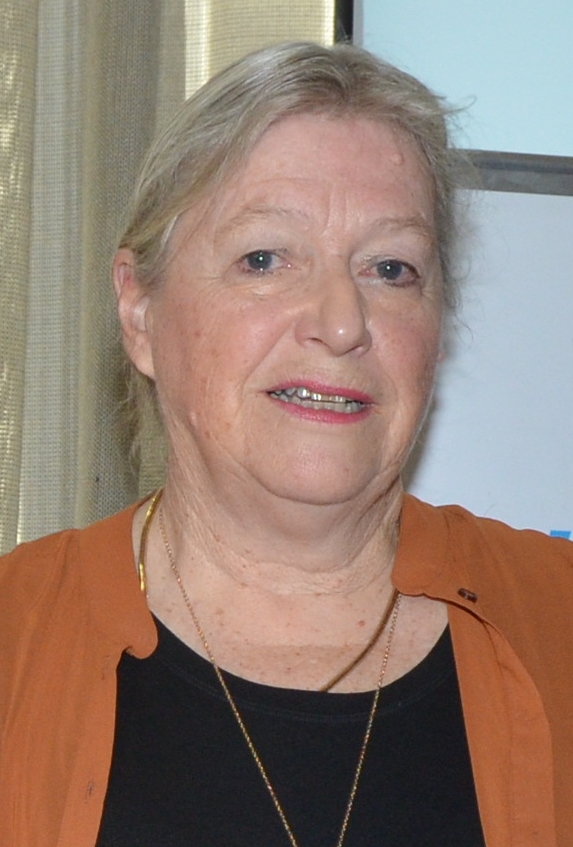
Sandra Coney

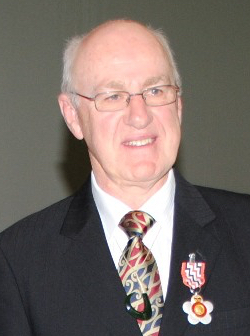
John Moorfield

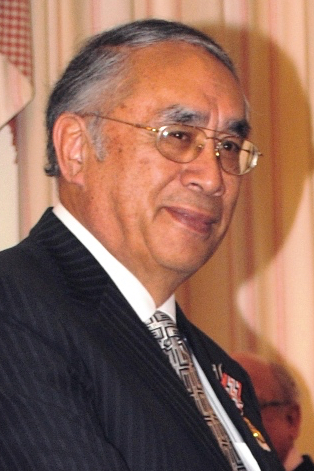
Darcy Nicholas

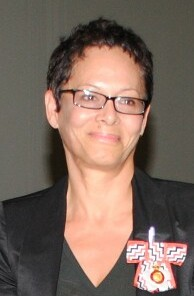
Teuila Percival

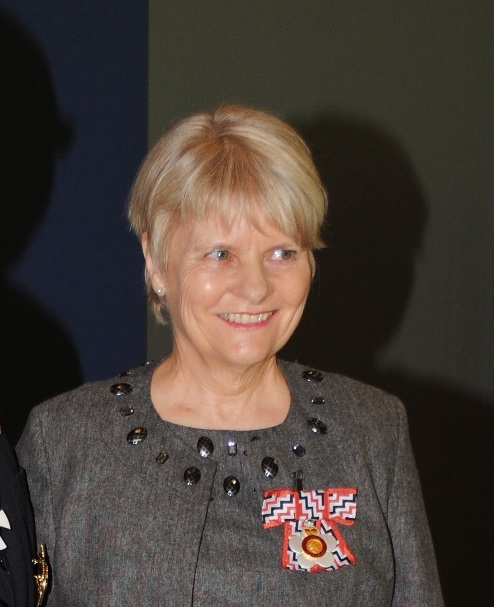
Susan St John

== Queen's Service Medal (QSM) ==
- William Russell Anstiss – of Ashburton. For services to the community.
- Marion June Barnes – of Te Aroha. For services to the community.
- Wing Commander John Stephenson Bates JP – of Taupō. For services to search and rescue.
- Ian Alexander Beker – of Invercargill. For services to the community.
- Senior Sergeant Brian Kingsley Benn – of Dunedin. For services to the New Zealand Police.
- Inspector Bruce William Bird – of Manukau. For services to the New Zealand Police.
- Rosalie Helen Blake JP – of Levin. For services to the library profession.
- John Carruthers Blundell – of Papakura. For services to the community.
- Margaret Nita Bowler – of Feilding. For services to the community.
- Shona Marion Bramley – of Hamilton. For services to asthma and respiratory care.
- Diane Elizabeth Brodie – of Christchurch. For services to the theatre.
- Cora Ellen Brooking – of Waiuku. For services to the community.
- Margaret Eleanor Burke – of Auckland. For services to veterans' affairs.
- Andrew Fraser Campbell – of North Shore City. For services to education and the community.
- Simon John Chaffey JP – of Picton. For services to the community.
- Ratilal Champaneri JP – of Wellington. For services to the Indian community.
- Joseph Churchward – of Wellington. For services to typography.
- Margery Gwen Clucas – of Ashburton. For services to the community.
- Elizabeth Dalrymple – of Walton. For services to the community.
- Christine Elizabeth De Jong – of Auckland. For services to music.
- Mark Antony De Jong – of Auckland. For services to music.
- Deborah Rose Dillon – of Stewart Island. For services to nursing and the community.
- Te Paea Sophie Dodd – of Māhia. For services to Māori
- Lorraine Ivy Edwards JP – of Taumarunui. For services to the community.
- Sister Valmae Marie Flannigan – of Wellington. For services to education.
- Arthur William Fletcher – of Paeroa. For services to returned services personnel and the community.
- Chief Fire Officer Mervyn James Forbes George – of Whitianga. For services to the New Zealand Fire Service.
- Leigh Rhonda Gibson – of Gisborne. For services to the YMCA.
- Michael William Gourley – of Wellington. For services to people with disabilities.
- Karla Jean Hammond – of Whakatāne. For services to people with disabilities.
- Denis Willmott Hansen – of Waitakere. For services to Māori and the community.
- Haami Tekuru Timu Hilton – of Napier. For services to Māori.
- Shona Yvonne Hobson – of Kaitaia. For services to the New Zealand Police and the community.
- Russell Daniel Hodges – of Winton. For services to the community.
- Leslie Glanville Howard – of Timaru. For services to the community.
- Foufou Susana Hukui – of Manukau. For services to the Pacific Islands community.
- John Peter Jensen – of Te Puke. For services to agriculture.
- John Lisle Kendrick – of Waipu. For services to wildlife.
- Michelle Dianne Kidd – of Auckland. For services to the community.
- Maria Parore Larsen – of Dargaville. For services to Māori and the community.
- Fleur Gillian Latham – of Christchurch. For services to education and the community.
- John Montgomery Latham – of Christchurch. For services to education and the community.
- Betty Suet Mui Leung JP – of New Plymouth. For services to the Chinese community.
- Siale Afuhia Lilo – of Manukau. For services to the Pacific Islands community.
- Ping Ching Mabbett – of Wellington. For services to the arts and the community.
- Barry John Mansell – of Ōtaki. For services to the community.
- Beverley May McConnell – of Howick. For services to horticulture.
- Sandra McKersey – of Whangārei. For services to education and the community.
- Stewart Clarence Miller – of Rolleston. For services to the community.
- Paul Chunilal Patel – of Palmerston North. For services to the Indian community.
- Robert Charles Penington JP – of Blenheim. For services to the community.
- Martinius Geraldus Pepers – of Stewart Island. For services to nursing and the community.
- John Shepherd Perkins – of Wellington. For services to radio.
- Craig Steven Primrose – of Auckland. For services to art, in particular painting.
- Allan Reid – of Christchurch. For services to shearing.
- Dr Gillian Anne Reid – of Auckland. For services to the community.
- Beverley Anne Revell JP – of Waitakere. For services to the community.
- Margaret Ann Robertson – of Wellington. For services to amateur theatre and the community.
- Frances Sheila Robinson – of Gisborne. For services to historic places.
- Gael Janet Collyns Roger JP – of Papamoa. For services to the community.
- Michael Patrick Ryan – of Westport. For services to the deepsea fishing industry.
- Soloi Tufuga Sanders – of Nelson. For services to the Pacific Islands community.
- Chief Fire Officer Wayne Malcolm Sarjeant – of Paraparaumu. For services to the New Zealand Fire Service.
- Richard Murch Scelly – of Whangamatā. For services to surf life saving.
- Sergeant James Leslie Sole – of Ashburton. For services to the New Zealand Police.
- Senior Sergeant Donald James Stuart – of Manukau. For services to the New Zealand Police.
- Sharon Joy Thorburn – of Wellington. For services to the community.
- Margaret Beryl Townshend JP – of Tauranga. For services to the community.
- Diana Mary Valentine – of Wanganui. For services to the community.
- Chief Fire Officer Alvan Graeme Wakeford – of Havelock North. For services to the New Zealand Fire Service.
- Chief Fire Officer Lindsay Walker – of Levin. For services to the New Zealand Fire Service.
- Charlene Puhiwahine Williams – of Waikanae. For services to nursing.
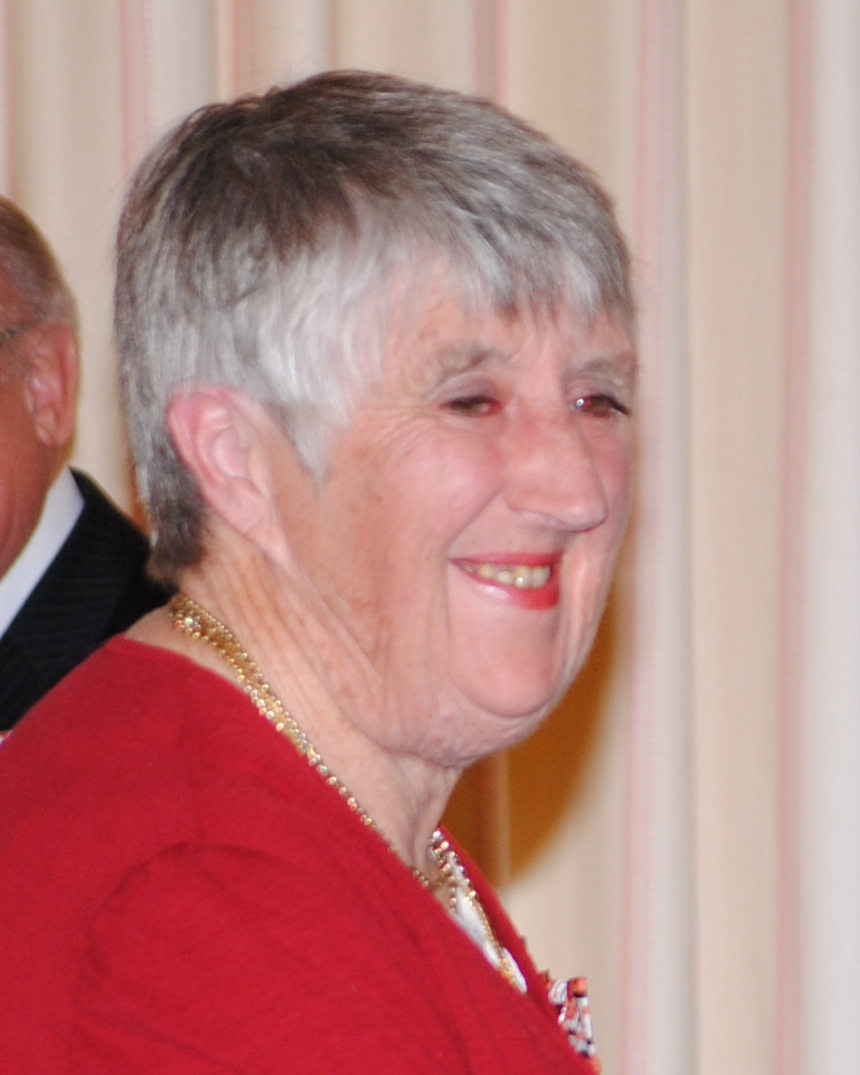
Rosalie Blake

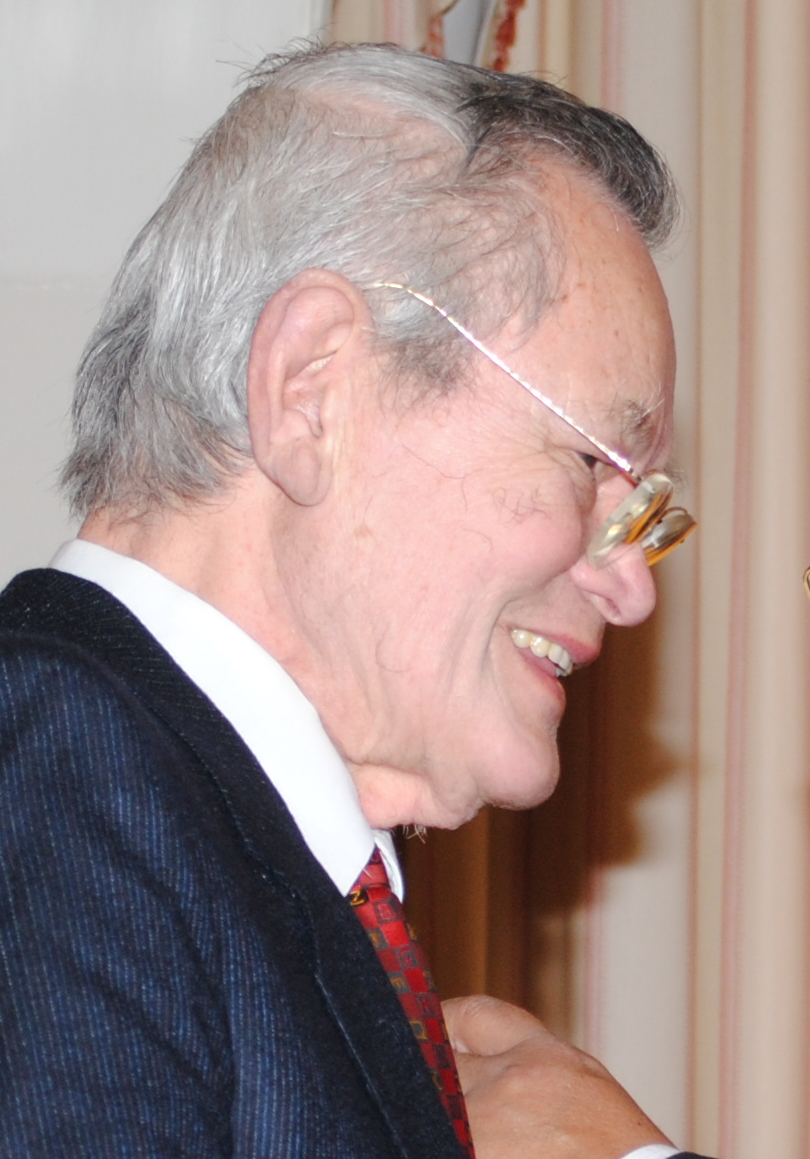
Joseph Churchward

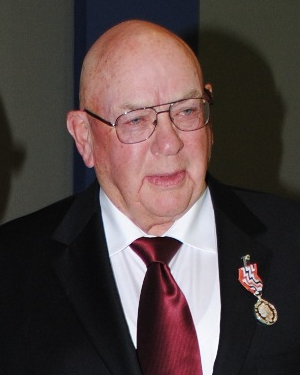
Richard Scelly

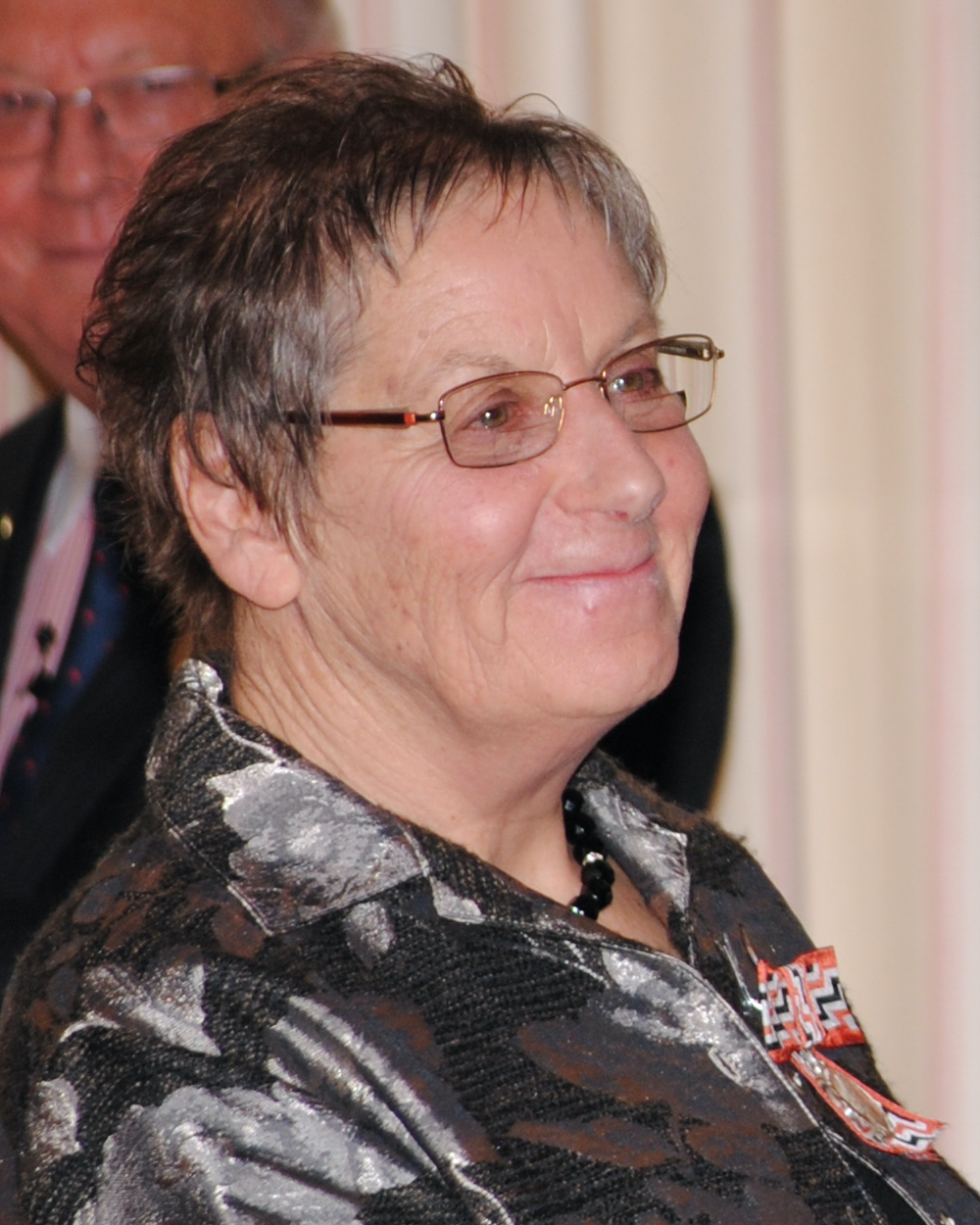
Di Valentine

== New Zealand Distinguished Service Decoration (DSD) ==
- Group Captain Mary Elizabeth Cox – Royal New Zealand Air Force (Retired), of Wellington.
- Commander Jason Stewart Haggitt – Royal New Zealand Navy, of Auckland.
- Lieutenant Blake William Herbert ED JP – Royal New Zealand Infantry Regiment, Territorial Force, of North Shore City.
- Lieutenant Michael William Koberstein – New Zealand Intelligence Corps, of Auckland.
- Major Simon Montague Marriott – Royal New Zealand Armoured Corps, Territorial Force, of Paeroa.
- Commander Andrew Gavin McMillan – Royal New Zealand Navy, of North Shore City.
- Corporal Matthew William Pearce – Royal New Zealand Infantry Regiment, of Christchurch.
- Wing Commander Brendon Pett – Royal New Zealand Air Force, of Waitakere.
- Major Brendan Patrick Wood – Royal New Zealand Army Medical Corps, of Christchurch.
