= Nigel Roberts (political scientist) =

New Zealand political scientist (born 1944)

Nigel Roberts ONZM
- Roberts in 2026
- Born: Nigel Somerset Roberts; 12 April 1944 (age 82); London, England
- Citizenship: New Zealand
- Known for: Commentator on national radio and television for New Zealand general elections, 1975–2008

Academic background
- Education: University of Tasmania; University of Essex

Academic work
- Discipline: Political science
- Institutions: University of Canterbury; Victoria University of Wellington
- Main interests: Electoral systems
- Website: nigel-roberts.info

Nigel Somerset Roberts ONZM (born 12 April 1944) is a New Zealand political scientist. He is currently an emeritus professor at Victoria University of Wellington. His teaching and research has been in the fields of political sociology and comparative politics. His research has focused on electoral systems and voting behaviour in New Zealand, Australia, United States of America, and Scandinavian countries. Roberts was a political science commentator on New Zealand national radio and television for the New Zealand general elections, 1975–2008, and has been described as "one of New Zealand's foremost political commentators".

Roberts is also a mountaineer, photographer and travel writer.

== Early life and education ==
Roberts was born on 12 April 1944 in London. His parents were Francis William Roberts and Lilian Edith Beatrice (née Wynn). He moved with his family to Johannesburg in South Africa when he was aged four. He attended Saxonwold Primary, Parktown Boys' High School, and St Stithians College in Johannesburg, followed by Theodore Roosevelt High School in Kent, Ohio. His first job was seven months as a proof reader's assistant for the Rand Daily Mail. He then became an American Field Scholar at Kent, Ohio, from 1962–63, taking courses including journalism. In 1962–1963, Roberts became increasingly interested in politics, and recalls watching live television coverage of President John F. Kennedy speaking during the Cuban Missile Crisis.

Roberts then followed his parents to Australia in 1964 and enrolled in political science studies at the University of Tasmania. He became involved in student politics in his first year and served one term as president of the Student Representative Council of the Tasmania University Union. Roberts completed a Bachelor of Arts degree in English and political science in 1967. He then took up a secondary-school teaching position in Surrey, England, and completed a Master of Arts degree from the University of Essex during 1968 and 1969, graduating in 1970.

In 1966, Roberts married Heather Richenda Meredith, a daughter of Richard and Bronwen Meredith. They have one son.

== Career ==
His teaching and research has been in the fields of political sociology and comparative politics. His research has focused on electoral systems and voting behaviour in New Zealand, Australia, United States of America, and Scandinavian countries.

From 1970 to 1981, Roberts was a lecturer and subsequently senior lecturer in political science at the University of Canterbury, in Christchurch, New Zealand. He took New Zealand citizenship in 1977.

During a period of study leave in 1976–77, Roberts was an adjunct lecturer at Aarhus University in Denmark.

=== Information Officer: Scott Base 1979–1980 summer season ===
Scott Base dedication of the DC-10 Erebus crash memorial cross

In mid-1979, Roberts was appointed information officer and photographer for the Antarctic Division of the Department of Scientific and Industrial Research at the New Zealand Scott Base in Antarctica, for the 1979–1980 summer season. While in Antarctica, Roberts took the well-known photograph of the tail of the Air New Zealand DC-10 aircraft that flew into Mount Erebus on 28 November 1979, killing all 237 passengers and 20 crew on board. The New Zealand Listener has said: "Nigel Roberts' picture of the DC-10's broken tail and koru emblem amid the snow remains one of the iconic images of New Zealand's 20th century". The Antarctica New Zealand online image gallery contains 398 photographs taken by Roberts.

=== Victoria University of Wellington ===
In February 1981, Roberts took up the position of director of continuing education, at Victoria University of Wellington, a position he held until 1994. From January 1994, Roberts was senior lecturer, associate professor / reader and then professor of political science at Victoria University of Wellington. He retired from full-time teaching and became an adjunct professor in January 2010, and was appointed an emeritus professor in 2013.

=== Election-night commentator ===
Roberts was an election-night commentator on Radio New Zealand for the New Zealand general elections in 1975, 1978, and 1984, and then for TVNZ for the eight successive general elections from 1987 to 2008. In 1979, The Press described Roberts as "one of New Zealand's foremost political commentators".

In 2011, Roberts was interviewed by Liam Ryan on RNZ. In the introduction, Ryan described Roberts as "being to political commentary as Keith Quinn has been to the All Blacks".

=== Electoral-system adviser ===
Spurred by public disillusionment with inequitable representation resulting from the first-past-the-post (FPP) electoral system, the Labour Party campaigned in 1981 and 1984 on a promise to establish a Royal Commission into the electoral system. Following their election into government in 1984, Labour established the Royal Commission on the Electoral System, and the commission's 1986 report recommended the adoption of mixed-member proportional representation (MMP). After the government sidelined the issue for years, the Bolger National government responded to public pressure by holding an indicative referendum on the electoral system in 1992. A second, binding referendum was held in 1993, asking voters to choose between FPP and MMP, and the MMP option won.

Roberts was one of the authors of the book Voter's Choice: Electoral Change in New Zealand that was published in 1992, just before the first referendum that ultimately led to New Zealand voters selecting a MMP representation system. The book explained the options that were presented in the referendum including: first-past-the-post, supplementary member, single transferable vote, mixed-member proportional, and preferential vote. A reviewer, James Watson, described the book as "a readable and succinct survey of what to most would seem a hopelessly technical issue".

Roberts worked as a political science adviser to the 1992 and 1993 New Zealand Electoral Referendum Panels, and from 2010 to 2012 as an expert adviser to the Electoral Commission's review of the MMP voting system.

=== Analysis of New Zealand general elections ===
In 1978, Roberts and Alan McRobie published Election '78: The 1977 Electoral Redistribution and the 1978 General Election in New Zealand. Their book was reviewed by the Australian elections analysis specialist Malcolm Mackerras, who described it as a "pioneering work" because of the retrospective analysis of the effect of the 1977 redefinition of electorate boundaries on the 1972 and 1975 general elections. The work included the development of improved methods for forecasting electoral outcomes, and for analysing the political bias of changes to electorate boundaries.

In a review in 1980 of a book New Zealand at the Polls, where Roberts was one of the contributors, Mike Hannah of The Press said: "A Roberts argument would, of course, be incomplete without a plethora of graphs. Among a bewildering array of statistics and 20 diagrams, he has succeeded in including a three-dimensional graph which will probably utterly puzzle the average reader. But you have to admire his ingenuity."

Roberts has collaborated with Stephen Levine and others from Victoria University of Wellington in publishing a series of books analysing successive New Zealand general elections. Roberts and Levine co-edited five of the books in the series. In a review of the 2007 book The Baubles of Office: The New Zealand General Election of 2005 by Roberts and Levine, the reviewer Andrew Geddis described the work as "the only comprehensive account of the 2005 election campaign and its aftermath". The work Key to Victory about the 2008 New Zealand General Election was the eighth in the series of post-election books.

== Mountaineering ==
In December 1959, as a 15-year-old, Roberts hitchhiked from Johannesburg to Moshi in Tanzania—a distance of around 4,000 km (2,500 mi)—to make an attempt at climbing Mount Kilimanjaro (elevation 5,895 m (19,341 ft) above sea level and 4,900 m (16,100 ft) above its plateau base). On that occasion, Roberts was unable to complete the ascent, turning back 1,000 m (3,300 ft) below the summit. However, he returned to Kilimanjaro 26 years later and completed the climb.

Roberts has also climbed the highest mountain in each of Australia's six states and its two mainland territories, with his climbing partner Eric Hodge, over a period of seven and a half years. This required five separate trips from New Zealand. The last of the eight peaks climbed was Mt Meharry in Western Australia in July 2016.

In September 2017, Roberts became the sixth non-American citizen and the first resident of the Southern Hemisphere to have climbed all 50 US state highpoints.

== Travel writing ==
Roberts has published travel writing in New Zealand newspapers including reports on hitchhiking in Africa 1959–1961, travel through Europe in a three-wheeler in 1963, to Czechoslovakia in 1969, the Camino de Santiago 2010 and 2017, and Ireland and the Nordic states in 2025.

== Honours and awards ==
In November 1987, Roberts was awarded the Hodge Fellowship for 1988—an award for social scientists that enables a researcher to undertake study without having teaching or other responsibilities.

In 2001, Roberts received a Fulbright short-term travel award.

Roberts (left), after his investiture as an Officer of the New Zealand Order of Merit by the governor-general, Sir Anand Satyanand, at Government House, Wellington, on 3 August 2011

In the 2010 Queen's Birthday Honours, Roberts was appointed an Officer of the New Zealand Order of Merit, for services to education.

== Selected publications ==
- Roberts, Nigel S. (1972). New Zealand and Nuclear Testing in the Pacific. New Zealand Institute of International Affairs.
- McRobie, Alan; Roberts, Nigel S. (1978). Election '78: The 1977 Electoral Redistribution and the 1978 General Election in New Zealand. John McIndoe. ISBN 9780908565498.
- Sullivan, John; Shamir, Michal; Walsh, Pat; Roberts, Nigel S. (1985). Political Tolerance in Context: Support for Unpopular Minorities in Israel, New Zealand, and the United States. Westview Press. ISBN 9780865318519.
- Catt, Helena; Harris, Paul; Roberts, Nigel S. (1992). Voter's Choice: Electoral Change in New Zealand?. The Dunmore Press. ISBN 9780864691477.
- Boston, Jonathan; Levine, Stephen; McLeay, Elizabeth; Roberts, Nigel S. (1996). New Zealand Under MMP: A New Politics?. University of Auckland Press/Bridget Williams Books. ISBN 9781869401382.
- Boston, Jonathan; Levine, Stephen; McLeay, Elizabeth; Roberts, Nigel S., eds. (1997). From Campaign to Coalition: New Zealand's First General Election Under Proportional Representation. The Dunmore Press. ISBN 9780864693143.
- Boston, Jonathan; Levine, Stephen; McLeay, Elizabeth; Roberts, Nigel S., eds. (2000). Left Turn: The New Zealand General Election of 1999. Victoria University Press. ISBN 9780864734044.
- Boston, Jonathan; Levine, Stephen; McLeay, Elizabeth; Roberts, Nigel S., eds. (2003). New Zealand Votes: The 2002 General Election. Victoria University Press. ISBN 9780864734686.
- Levine, Stephen; Roberts, Nigel S., eds. (2007). The Baubles of Office: The New Zealand General Election of 2005. Victoria University Press. ISBN 9780864735393.
- Levine, Stephen; Roberts, Nigel S., eds. (2010). Key to Victory: The New Zealand General Election of 2008. Victoria University Press. ISBN 9780864736130.
