= 2018 New Year Honours (New Zealand) =

Annual awards for New Zealanders

- Previous: 2017 Queen's Birthday Honours; Next: 2018 Queen's Birthday Honours
- Type: New Zealand royal honours: Order of New Zealand; New Zealand Order of Merit; Queen's Service Order; Queen's Service Medal; New Zealand Distinguished Service Decoration
- Date: 30 December 2017
- Country: New Zealand
- Total recipients: 179

The 2018 New Year Honours in New Zealand were appointments by Elizabeth II in her right as Queen of New Zealand, on the advice of the New Zealand government, to various orders and honours to reward and highlight good works by New Zealanders, and to celebrate the passing of 2017 and the beginning of 2018. They were announced on 30 December 2017.

The recipients of honours are displayed here as they were styled before their new honour.

== Order of New Zealand ==
Ordinary member

- Cassia Joy Coles DCNZM OBE – of Featherston. For services to New Zealand.
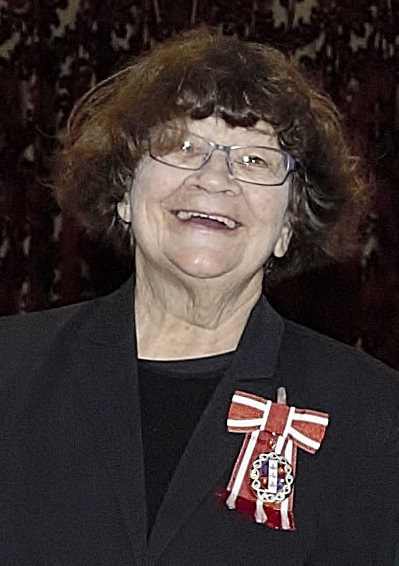
Joy Cowley

== New Zealand Order of Merit ==
=== Dame Companion (DNZM) ===
- Rangimarie Naida Glavish ONZM JP – of Auckland. For services to Māori and the community.
- The Honourable Annette Faye King – of Wellington. For services as a member of Parliament.
- Denise Ann L'Estrange-Corbet MNZM – of Auckland. For services to fashion and the community.
- The Honourable Georgina Manunui te Heuheu QSO – of Auckland. For services to the State and Māori.
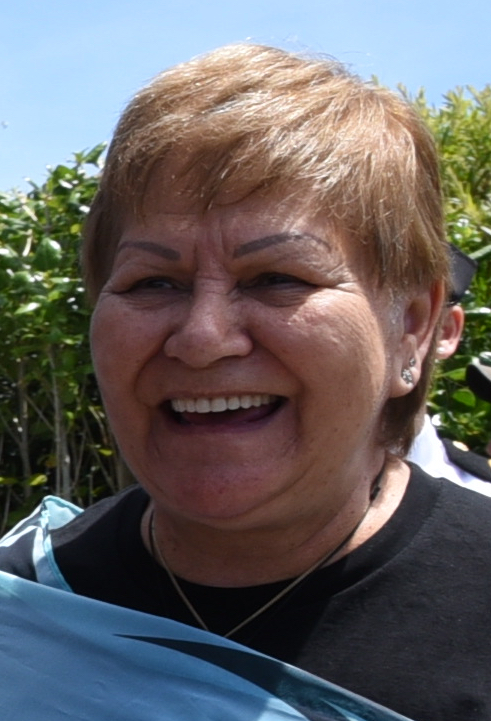
Dame Rangimarie Glavish

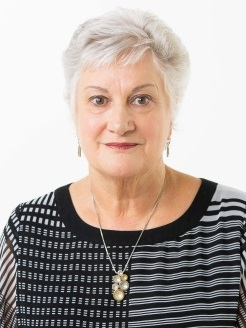
Dame Annette King

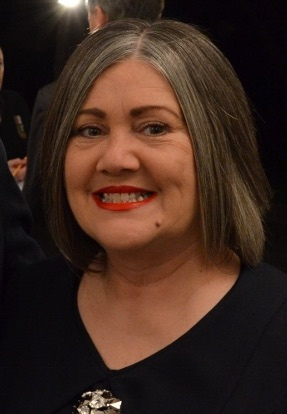
Dame Denise L'Estrange-Corbet

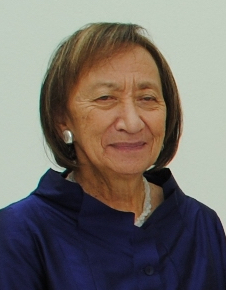
Dame Georgina te Heuheu

=== Knight Companion (KNZM) ===
- Herbert John Te Kauru Clarke CNZM – of Lower Hutt. For services to Māori and heritage preservation.
- The Honourable Douglas John White QC – of Wellington. For services to the judiciary.
- Bryan George Williams CNZM MBE – of Auckland. For services to rugby.
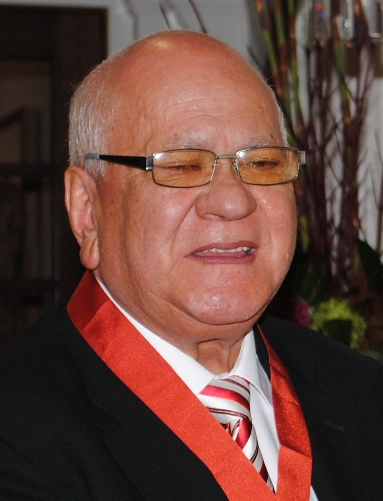
Sir John Clarke

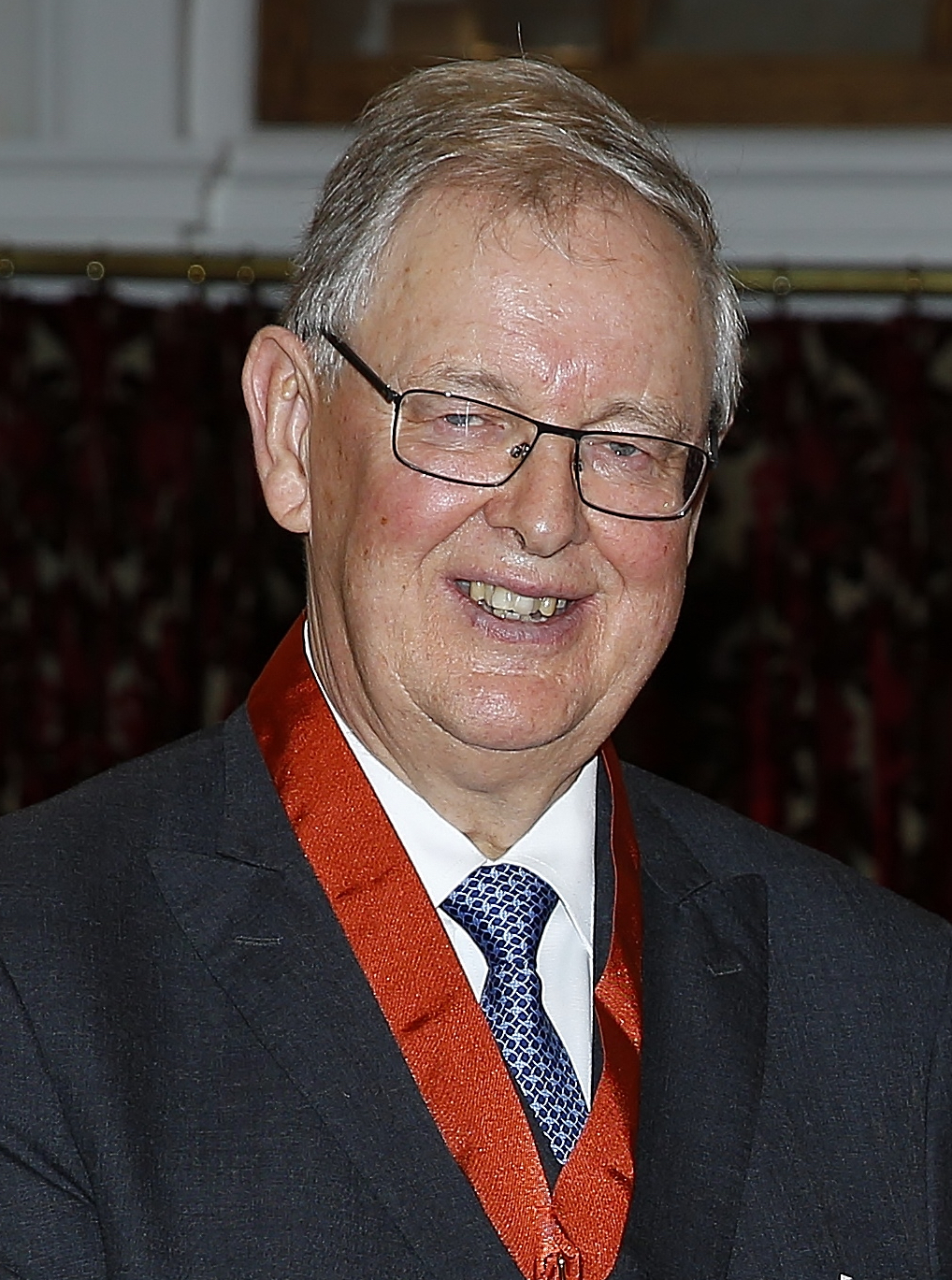
Sir Douglas White

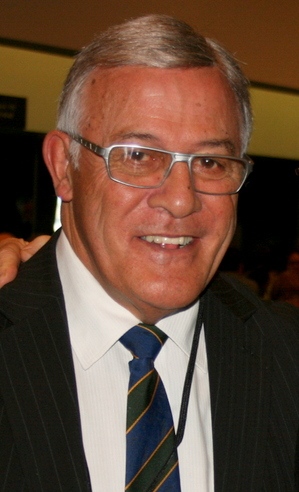
Sir Bryan Williams

=== Companion (CNZM) ===
- The Honourable Dr Michael Edward Rainton Bassett QSO JP – of Auckland. For services as a historian.
- William Norman Birnie – of Auckland. For services to governance, the arts and sport.
- Dr Garth Alan Carnaby MNZM – of Lincoln. For services to science and governance.
- The Honourable Peter Francis Dunne – of Wellington. For services as a member of Parliament.
- Dr Manying Bess Ip ONZM – of Auckland. For services to the Chinese community and education.
- Dr William Blair Rhodes Rolleston – of Saint Andrews. For services to the farming industry.
- Frances Valintine – of Auckland. For services to education and the technology sector.
- Graeme Paul Wheeler – of Lower Hutt. For services to the State.
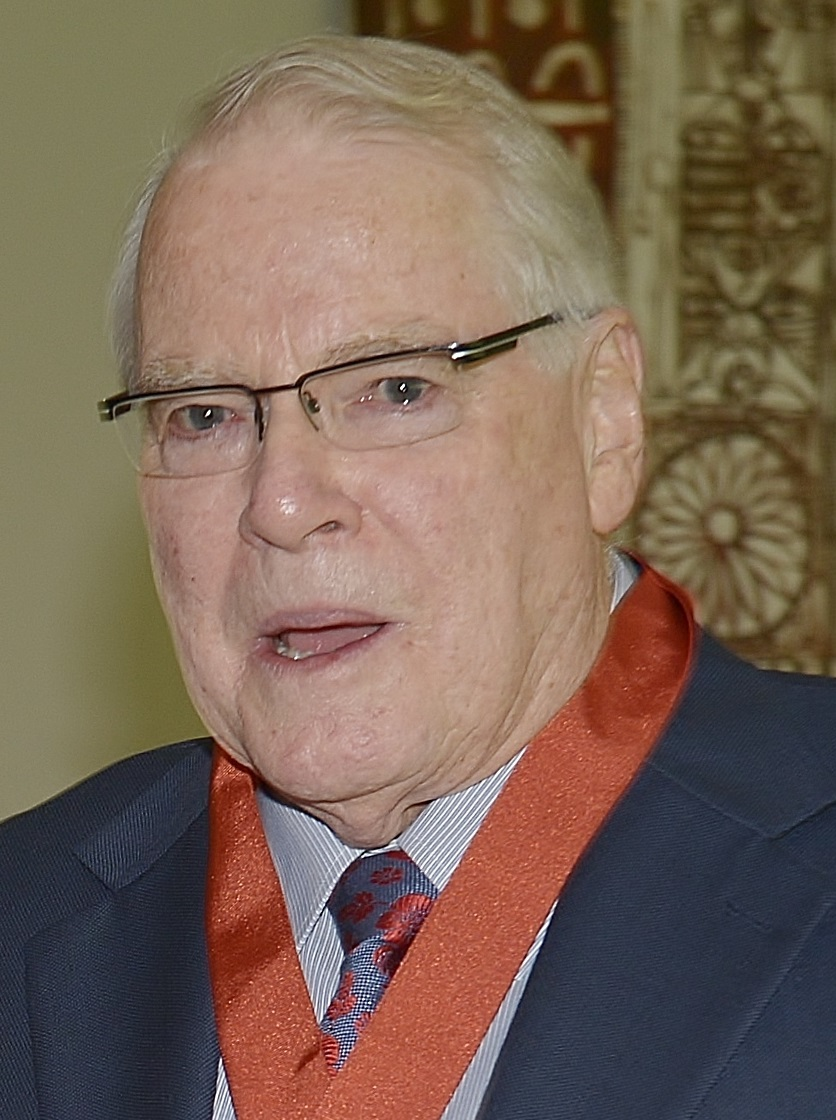
Michael Bassett

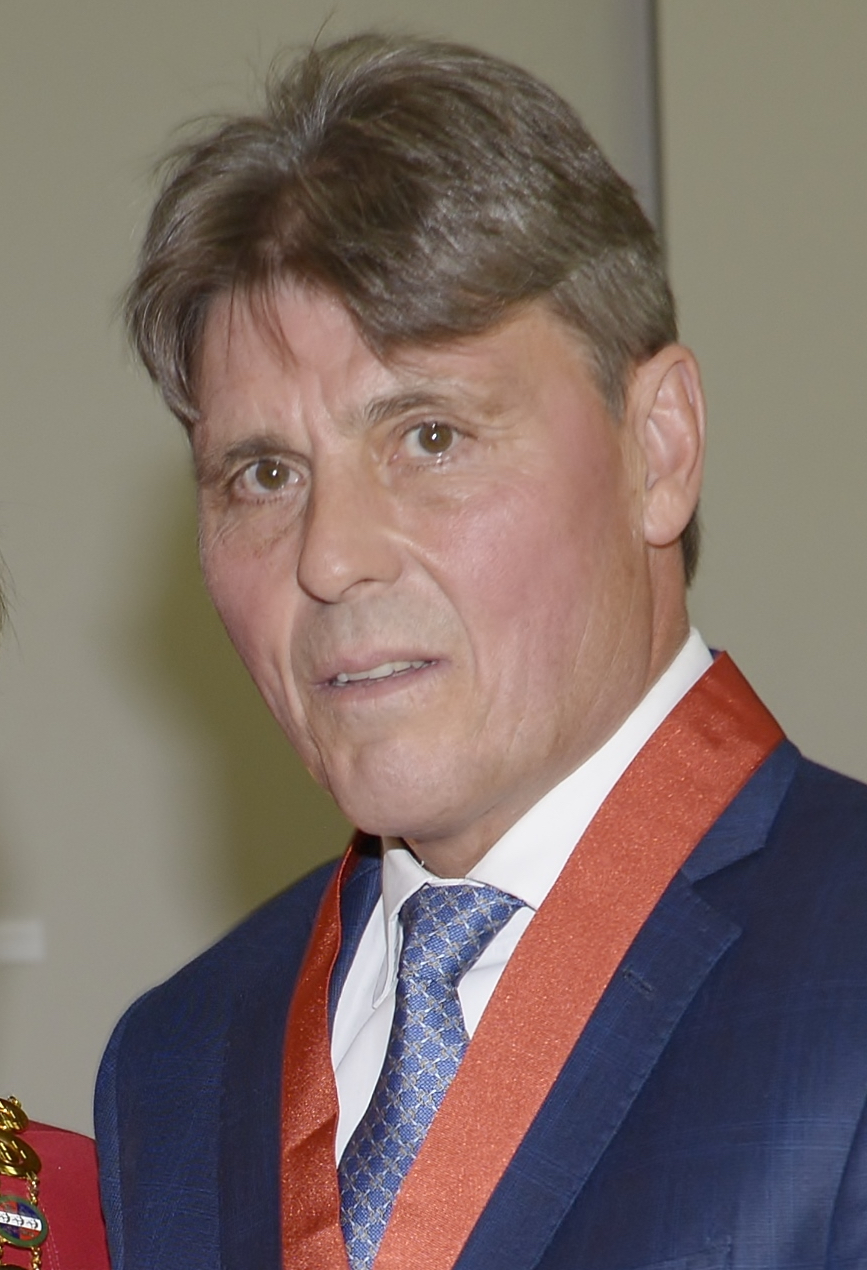
Bill Birnie

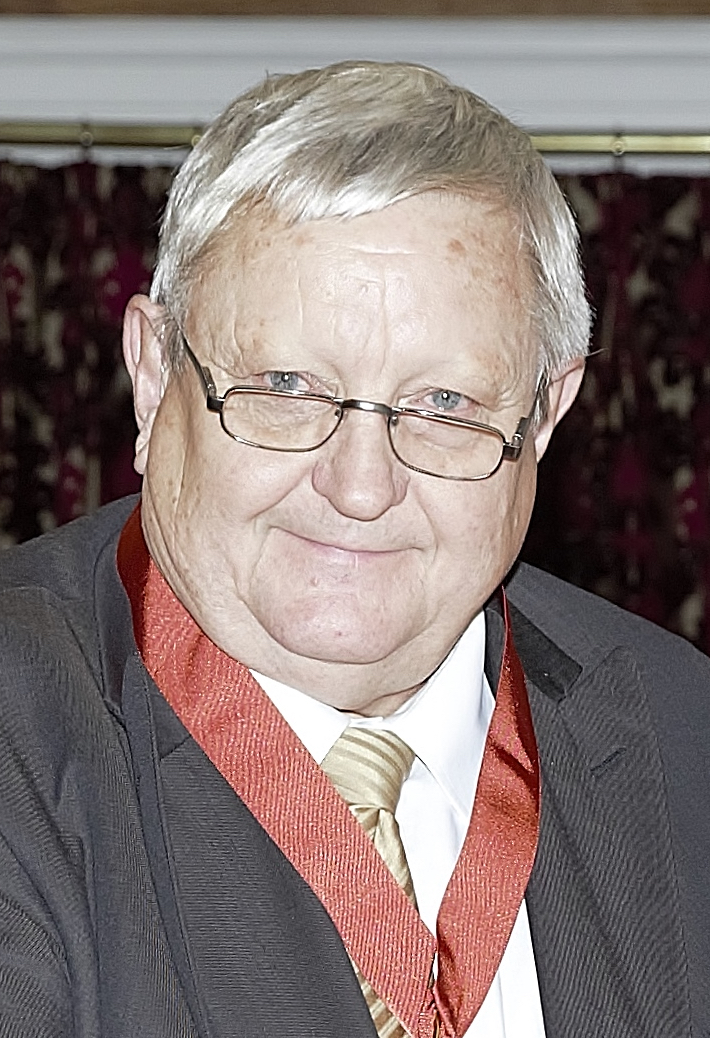
Garth Carnaby

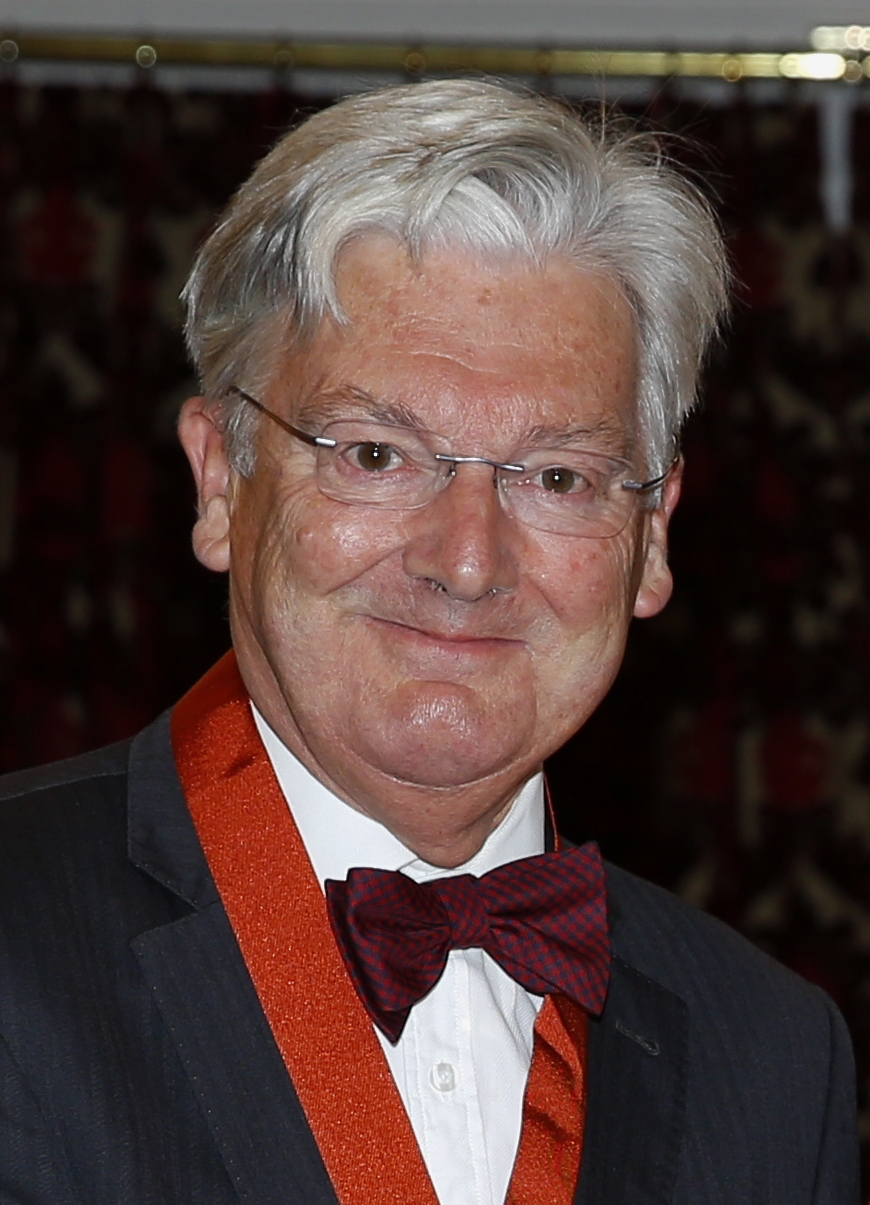
Peter Dunne

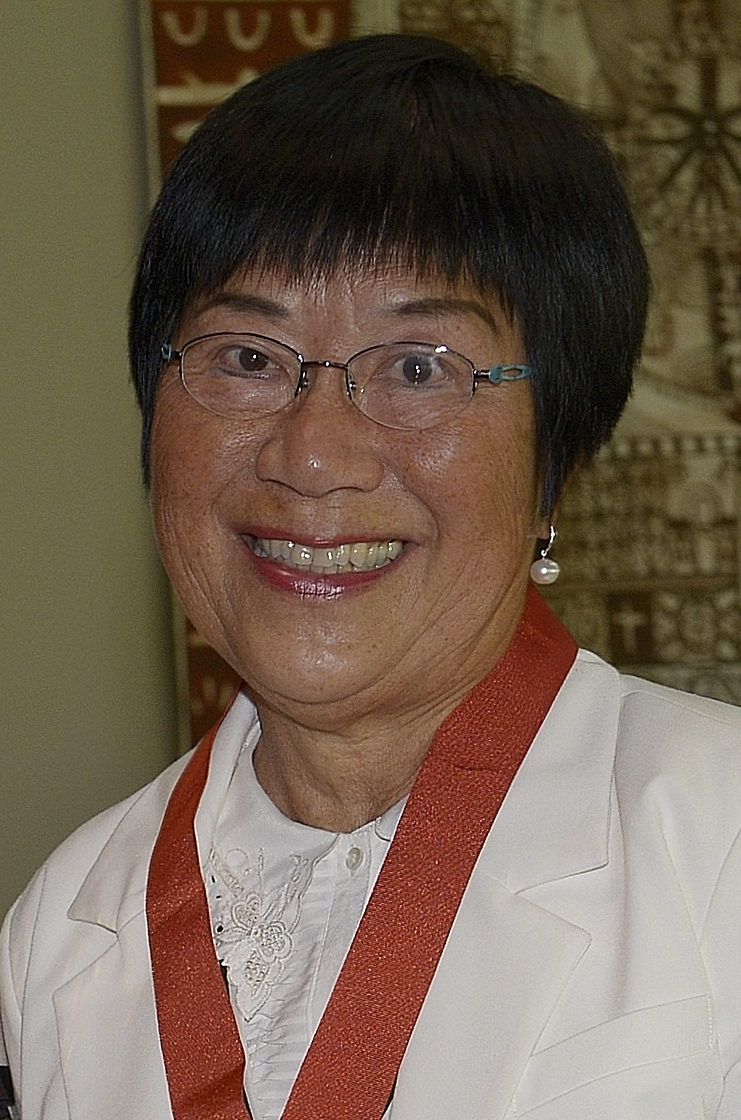
Manying Ip

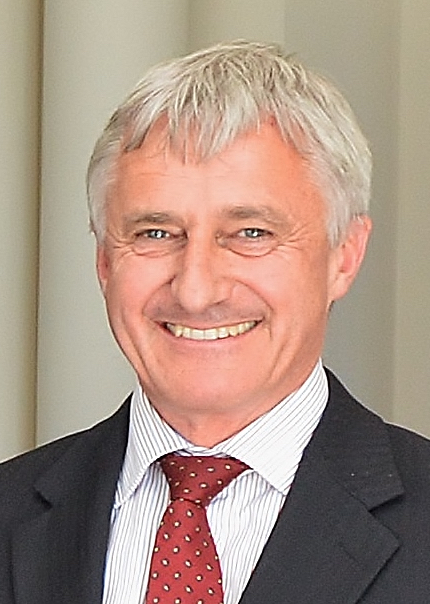
William Rolleston

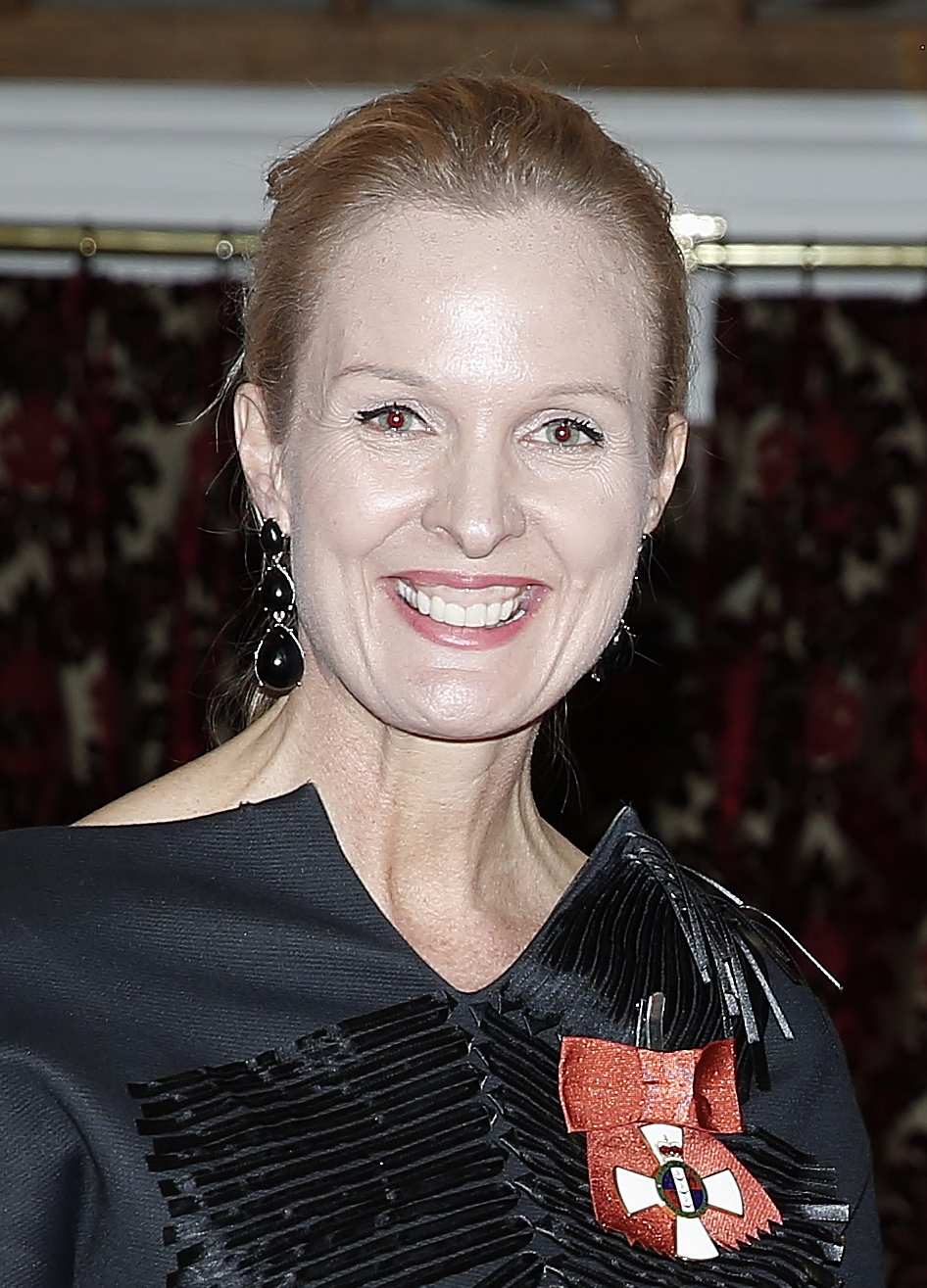
Frances Valintine

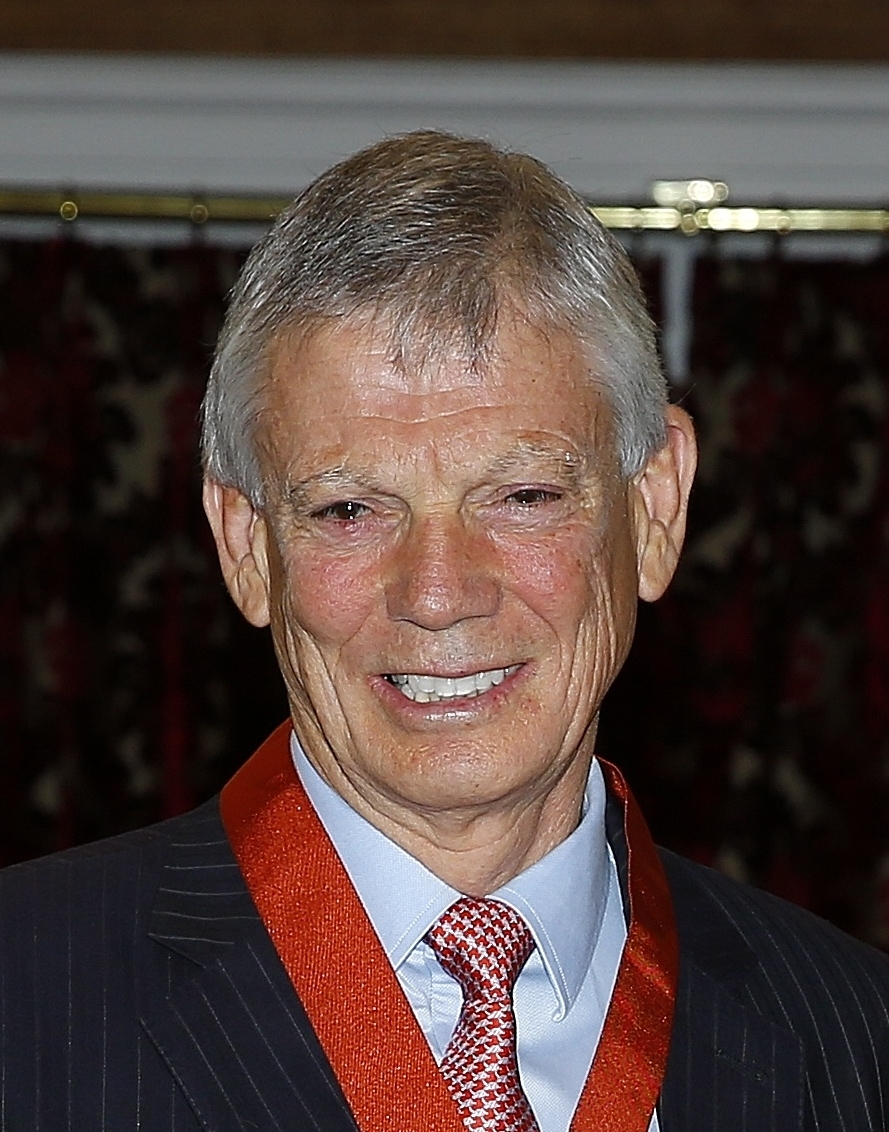
Graeme Wheeler

=== Officer (ONZM) ===
- Neil Frank Bateup – of Huntly. For services to agriculture and the community.
- Donald James Best – of Wellington. For services to music.
- Colin Maungapohatu Bidois – of Tauranga. For services to Māori.
- Richard Boast – of Wellington. For services to the law and Māori.
- Rachel Jane Brown – of Auckland. For services to sustainable business development.
- Rhana Jean Devenport – of Auckland. For services to arts governance.
- Jeremy Jane Drummond – of Auckland. For services to early childhood education.
- Detective Inspector Thomas John Fitzgerald – of Canberra, Australia. For services to the New Zealand Police and the community.
- Frederick John Graham – of Waiuku. For services to Māori art.
- John Norman Harrison – of Lyttelton. For services to music and theatre.
- Dr Andrew Alexander Hill – of Auckland. For services to endoluminal vascular repair.
- Dr Andrew Hugh Holden – of Auckland. For services to endoluminal vascular repair.
- Robin Michael Newton Hood – of Auckland. For services to springboard and platform diving.
- Robert Jan Jager – of New Plymouth. For services to business and health and safety.
- Archdeacon William Tutepuaki (Wiremu) Kaua JP – of Wellington. For services to Māori, education and the State.
- Russell Kemp – of Kaiwaka. For services to Māori.
- Nicola Legat – of Auckland. For services to the publishing industry.
- Dr James Malcolm Macpherson – of Alexandra. For services to local government and the community.
- Wetini Swainson Mitai-Ngatai – of Rotorua. For services to Māori performing arts.
- Professor Edwin Arthur Mitchell – of Auckland. For services to children's health.
- Julia Morison – of Christchurch. For services to visual arts.
- Penelope Jane Mudford – of Wellington. For services to arbitration and the primary industries sector.
- Helen Mary Pollock – of Auckland. For services to art, particularly sculpture.
- Margarita Anna Robertson – of Dunedin. For services to the fashion industry.
- Helen Alison Robinson – of Auckland. For services to business, particularly the technology sector.
- William Edward Speedy – of Auckland. For services to philanthropy and watersports.
- Peter John Turnbull – of Whangārei. For services to aviation.
- Sharon Wilson-Davis – of Auckland. For services to the community.
- Helene Wong – of Auckland. For services to the arts and the Chinese community.
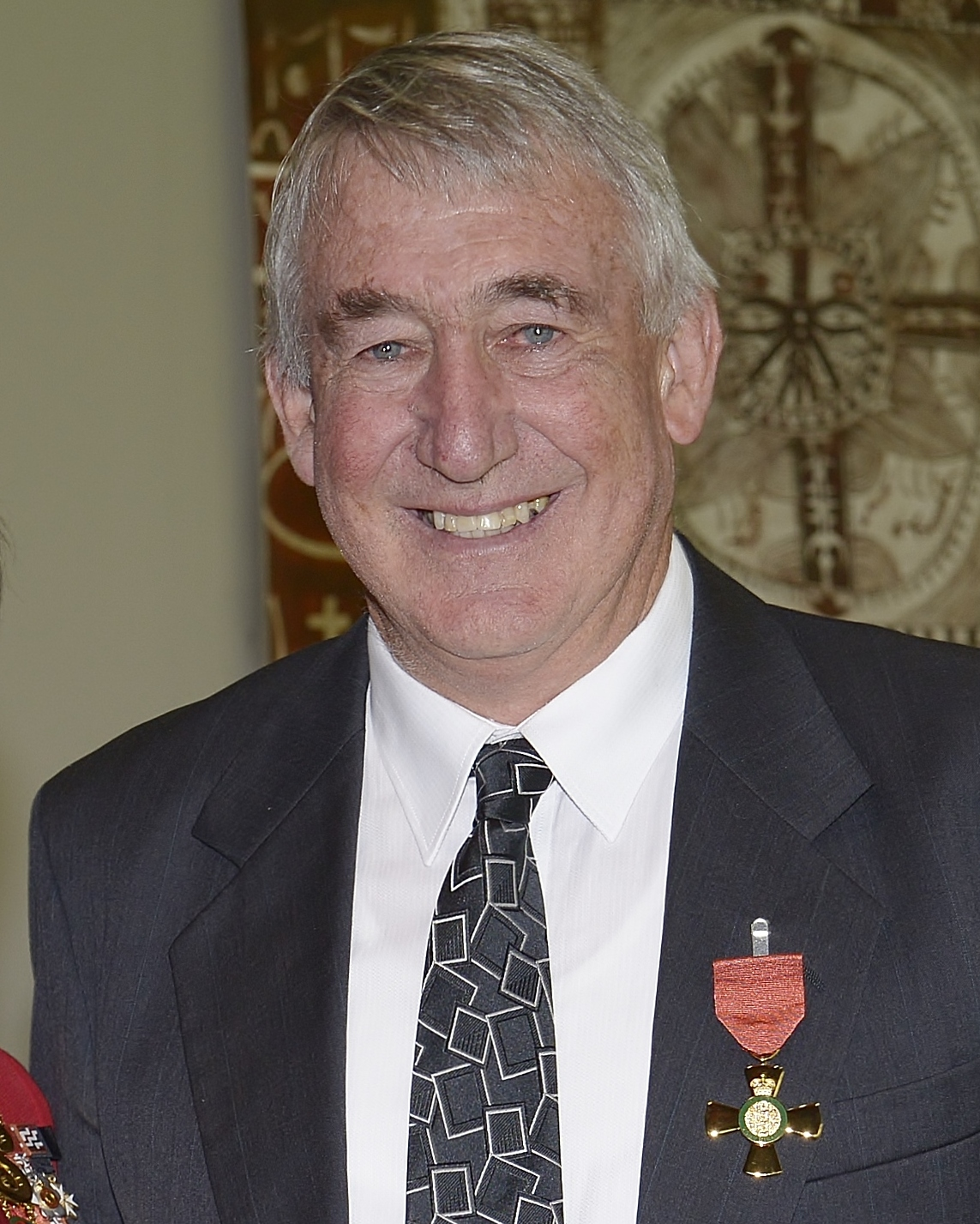
Neil Bateup

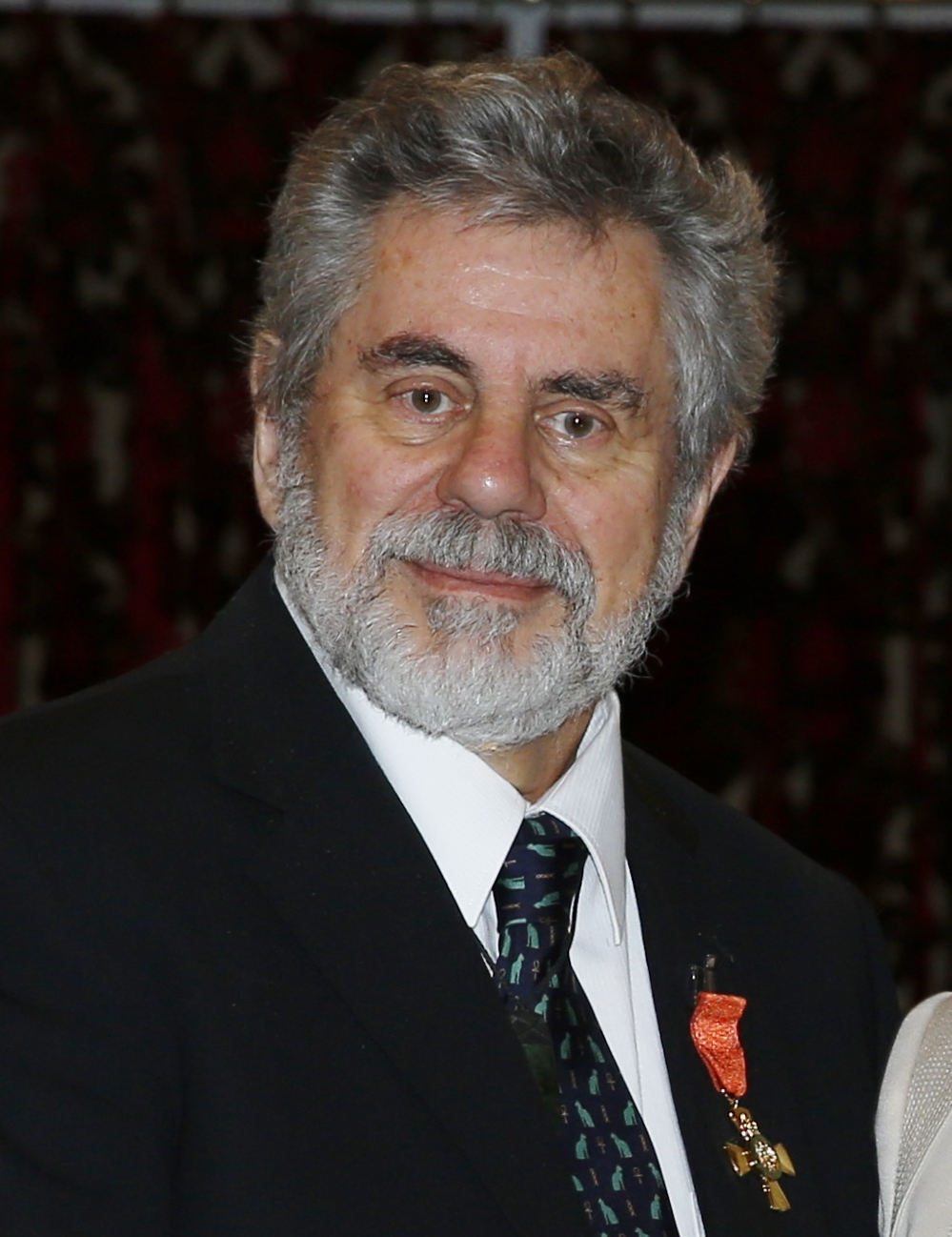
Richard Boast

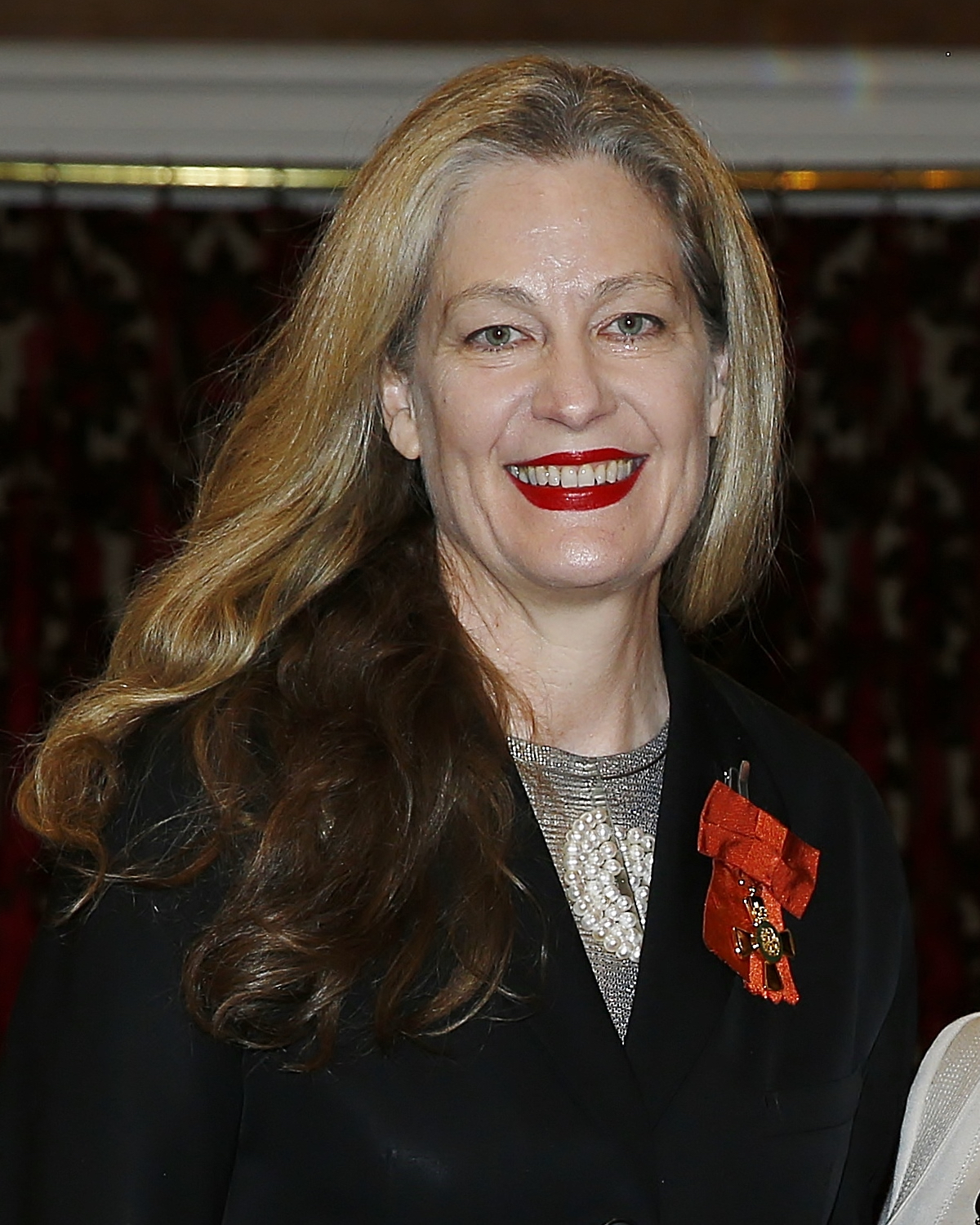
Rhana Devenport

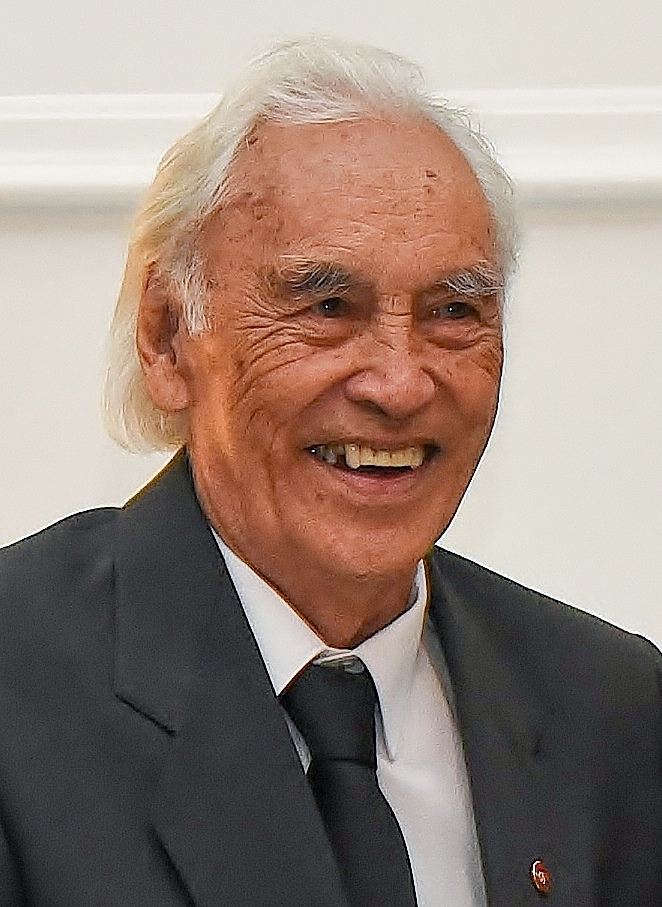
Fred Graham

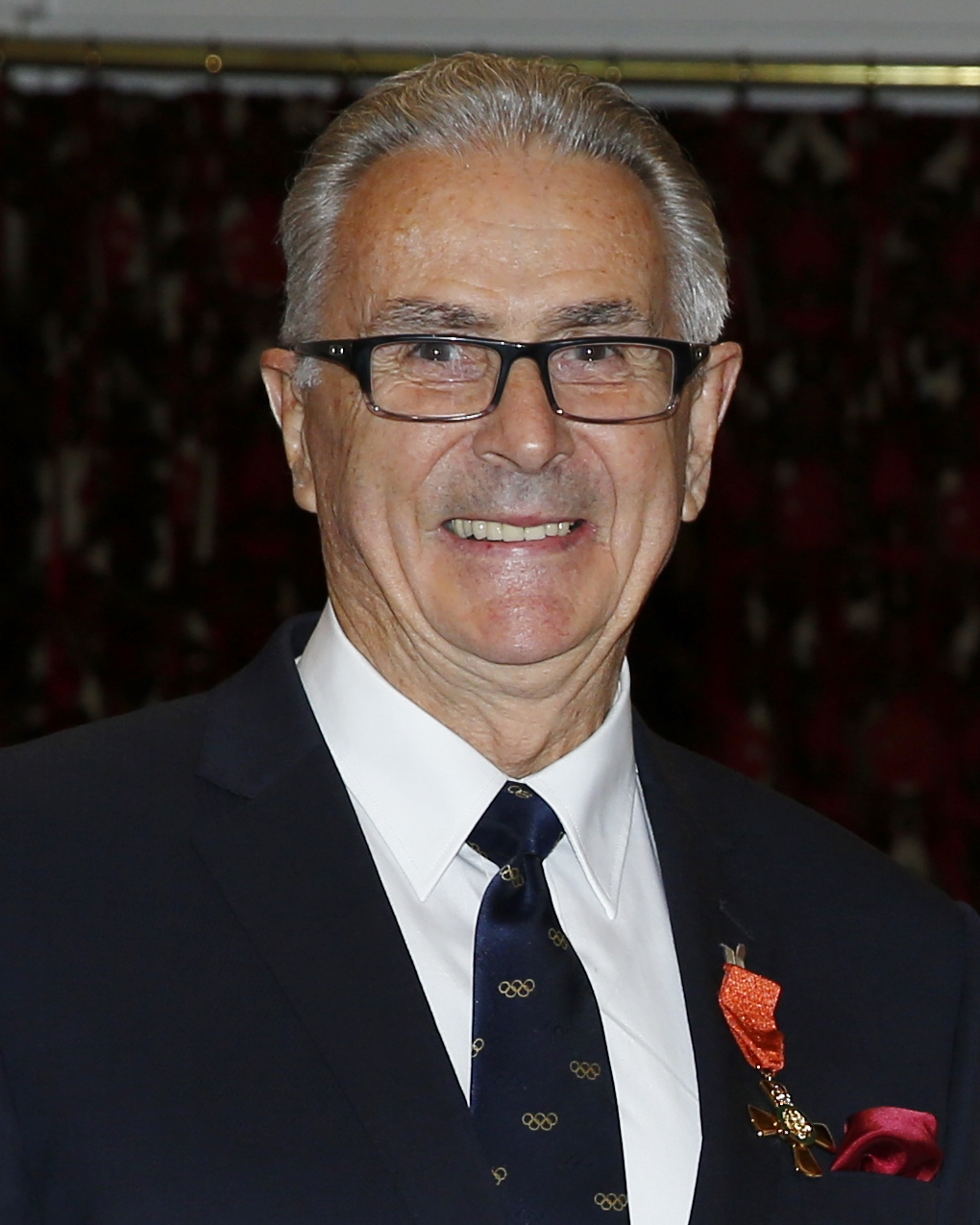
Robin Hood

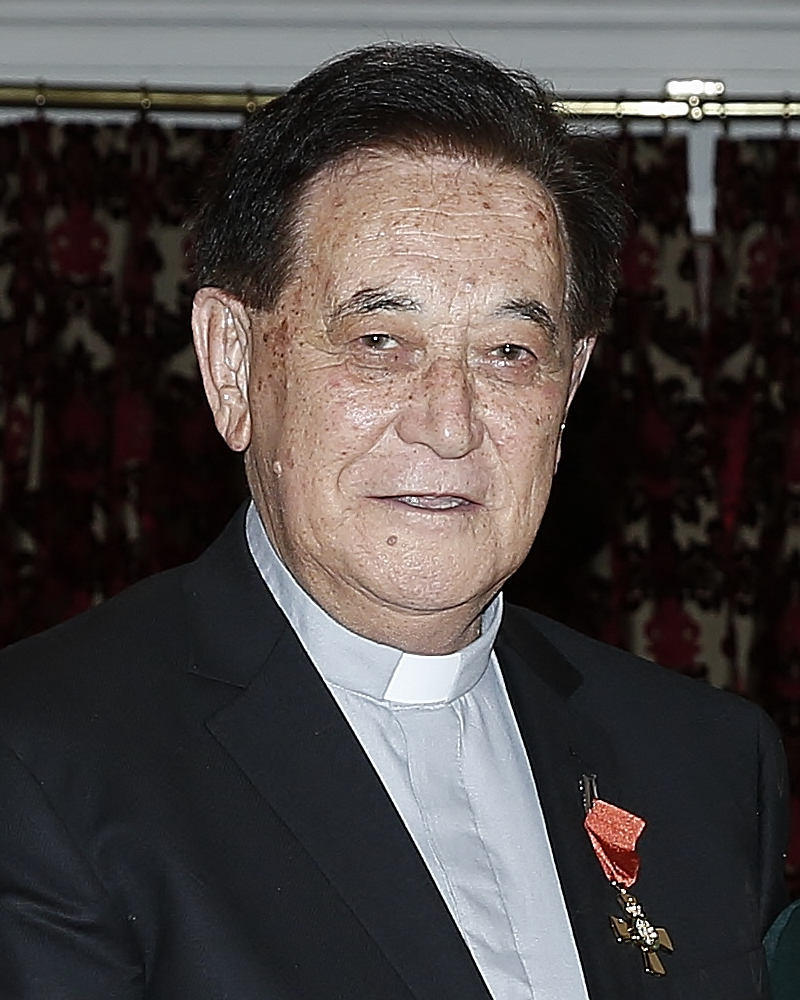
Wiremu Kaua

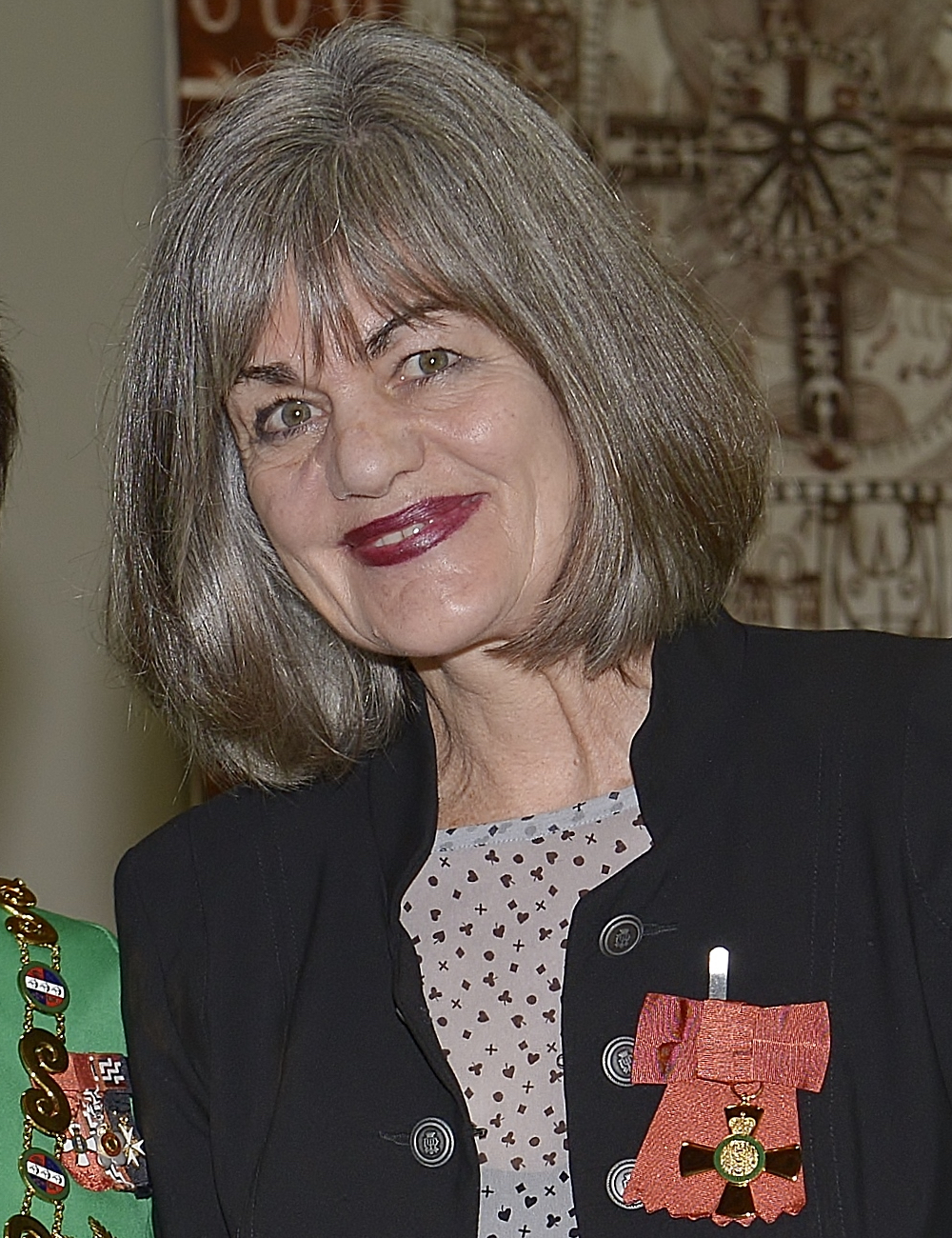
Nicola Legat

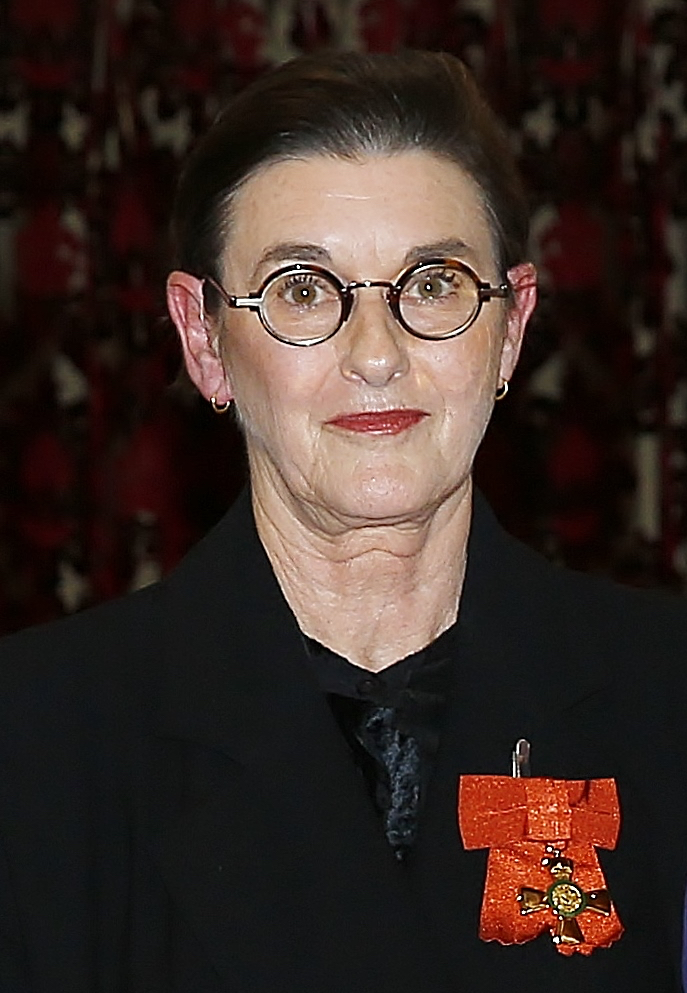
Julia Morison

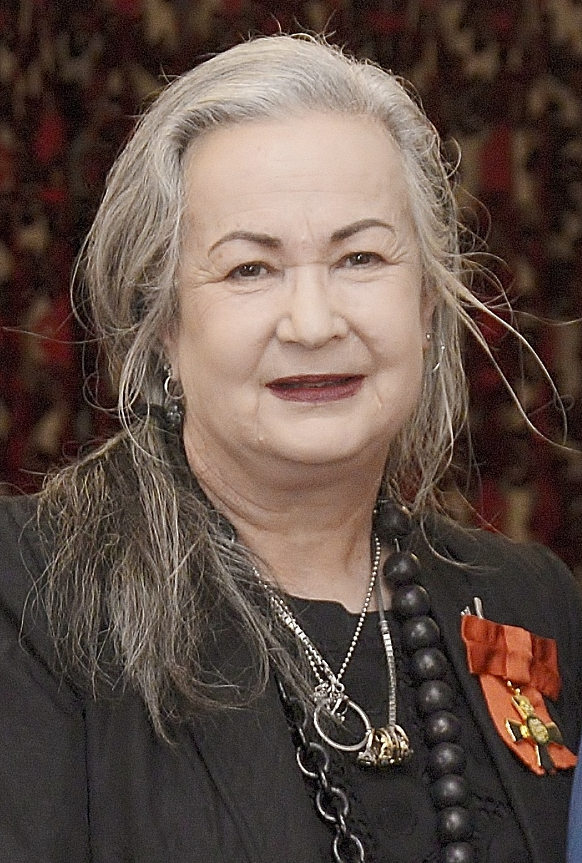
Margi Robertson

=== Member (MNZM) ===
- Barry Charles Atkinson – of Gisborne. For services to philanthropy and the community.
- Bryce Robert Barnett – of New Plymouth. For services to governance and philanthropy.
- Dr Judy Blakey – of Auckland. For services to seniors.
- Calven Dennis Bonney – of Auckland. For services to the trucking industry and motorsport.
- Elise Ruth Bradley – of Toronto, Canada. For services to music.
- Professor Barbara Brookes – of Dunedin. For services to historical research and women.
- Heather Marie Brunsdon – of Napier. For services to dance.
- Sonia Claire Chambers – of Auckland. For services to people with disabilities.
- Nicholas John Cooper Chapman – of Wairoa. For services to education and conservation.
- Dugald Stuart Collie – of Invercargill. For services to agriculture and education.
- Allan David Cook – of Marton. For services to river and drainage engineering.
- Vernon John Dark – of Kaiwaka. For services to business and education.
- Professor Sally Davenport – of Wellington. For services to science.
- Elizabeth Anne Dawson – of Wellington. For services to sports governance.
- Melanie Jane Donne – of Whanganui. For services to training disability assistance dogs.
- Jennifer Ellis – of New Plymouth. For services to education.
- Suzanne Louise Ellison – of Waikouaiti. For services to Māori, the arts and governance.
- Virginia Mary Goldblatt – of Palmerston North. For services to arbitration and mediation.
- John Leslie Gow – of Auckland. For services to art.
- Dr John Clive Guthrie – of Dunedin. For services to education and sport.
- Denis Louis Hartley – of Ōhope. For services to aviation and rescue services.
- Dr Palatasa Havea – of Palmerston North. For services to the Pacific community and the dairy industry.
- Associate Professor Michael John Hilton – of Dunedin. For services to conservation.
- Noel Harold Selwyn Hyde – of Rotorua. For services to wildlife conservation and research taxidermy.
- Dr John Stephen Kay – of Auckland. For services to the New Zealand Defence Force.
- Nita Carol Knight – of Nelson. For services to business and the community.
- Gary Keith Langsford – of Auckland. For services to art.
- Dr Renee Wen-Wei Liang – of Auckland. For services to the arts.
- John Leslie Mace – of Auckland. For services to swimming.
- Donna Matahaere-Atariki – of Dunedin. For services to Māori and health.
- Paul McArdle – of Havelock North. For services to cycling and the community.
- Maxine Huirangi Grace Moana-Tuwhangai – of Ngāruawāhia. For services to governance and Māori.
- Emeritus Professor Roger Ian Moltzen – of Hamilton. For services to education.
- Cameron Cooper Moore – of Christchurch. For services to the manufacturing industry and the community.
- Dr Camille Elizabeth Anne Nakhid – of Auckland. For services to ethnic communities and education.
- Dr Suitafa Deborah Ryan Nicholson – of Wellington. For services to the Pacific community and health.
- Hare Paniora – of Auckland. For services to Māori and education.
- Neville Douglas Peat – of Dunedin. For services to conservation.
- Bruce Picot – of Nelson. For services to business.
- Paul Ferrier Pritchett – of Lyttelton. For services to yachting and the community.
- Lisa Marie Reihana – of Auckland. For services to art.
- Sarah Mihiroa Reo – of Havelock North. For services to Māori and education.
- Professor Kabini Fa'ari Sanga – of Wellington. For services to education and the Pacific community.
- Father Barry Scannell – of Wellington. For services to the community and heritage preservation.
- Lloyd Owen Scott – of Wellington. For services to broadcasting, theatre and television.
- Philip James Sherry JP – of Papamoa. For services to local government and broadcasting.
- Nigel Dean Skelt – of Invercargill. For services to badminton.
- Senior Constable Russell Hadden Smit – of Blenheim. For services to the New Zealand Police and youth.
- Fiona Angeline Southorn – of One Tree Point. For services to sport, particularly cycling.
- Susan Marie Stanaway – of Auckland. For services to philanthropy and the community.
- Mark James Stewart – of Darfield. For services to the community and sport.
- Dr David Collins Tipene-Leach – of Napier. For services to Māori and health.
- Petrina Marie Togi-Sa'ena – of Auckland. For services to Pacific music.
- Maureen Vida Truman – of Greymouth. For services to education.
- Pania Tyson-Nathan – of Porirua. For services to Māori and business.
- Graeme Richard Wallis – of Christchurch. For services to music.
- Dr Haare Mahanga Te Wehinga Williams JP – of Papakura. For services to Māori, the arts and education.

Honorary

- Valeti Finau – of Auckland. For services to education and the Pacific community.
- Noriyuki Inoue – of Nishinomiya, Japan. For services to New Zealand–Japan relations.
- Charles Enoka Kiata – of Auckland. For services to the Pacific community.
- Dr Rudolf Hendrik Kleinpaste – of Christchurch. For services to entomology, conservation and entertainment.
- Alan Patrick McCarthy – of Dublin, Ireland. For services to New Zealand–Ireland relations.
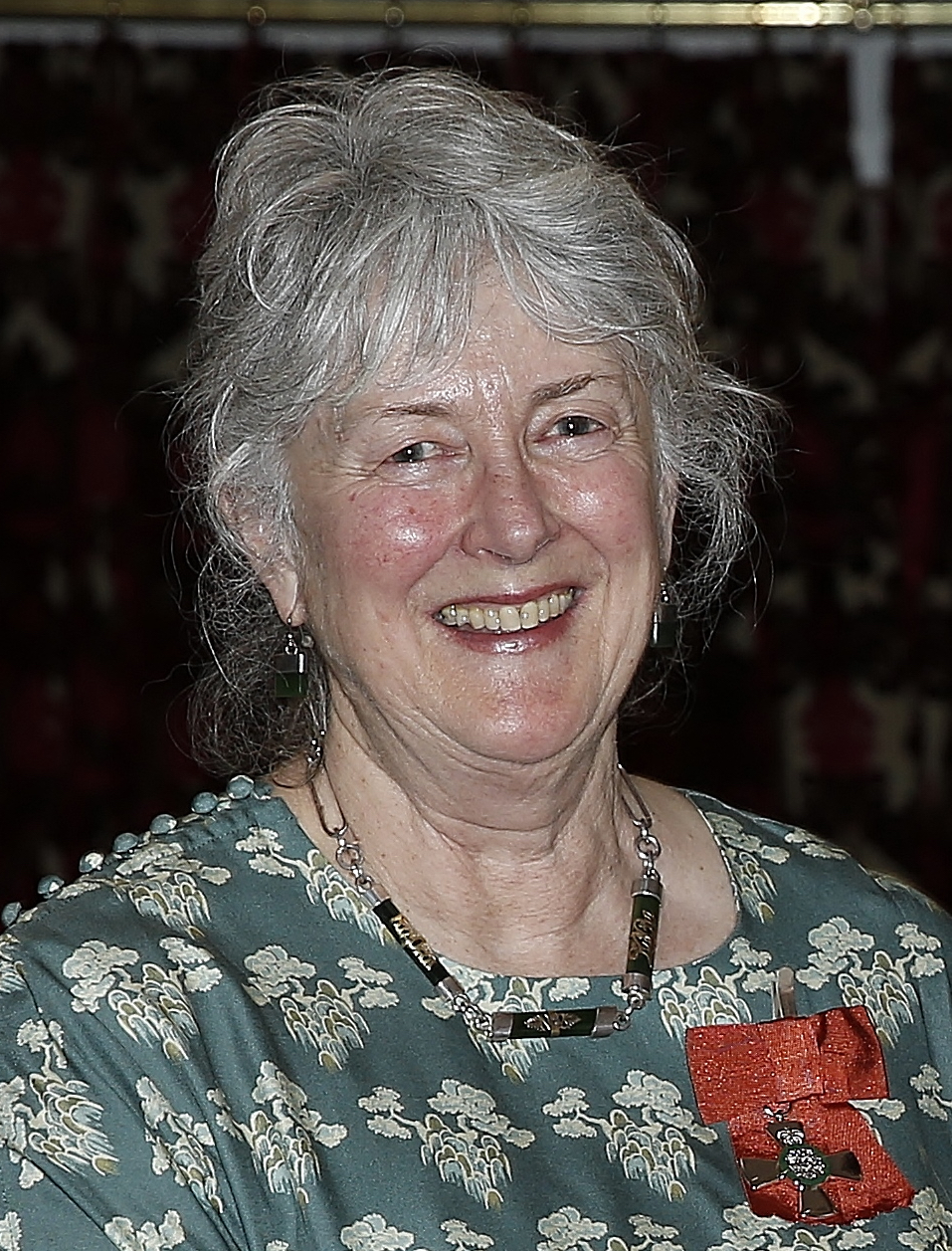
Barbara Brookes

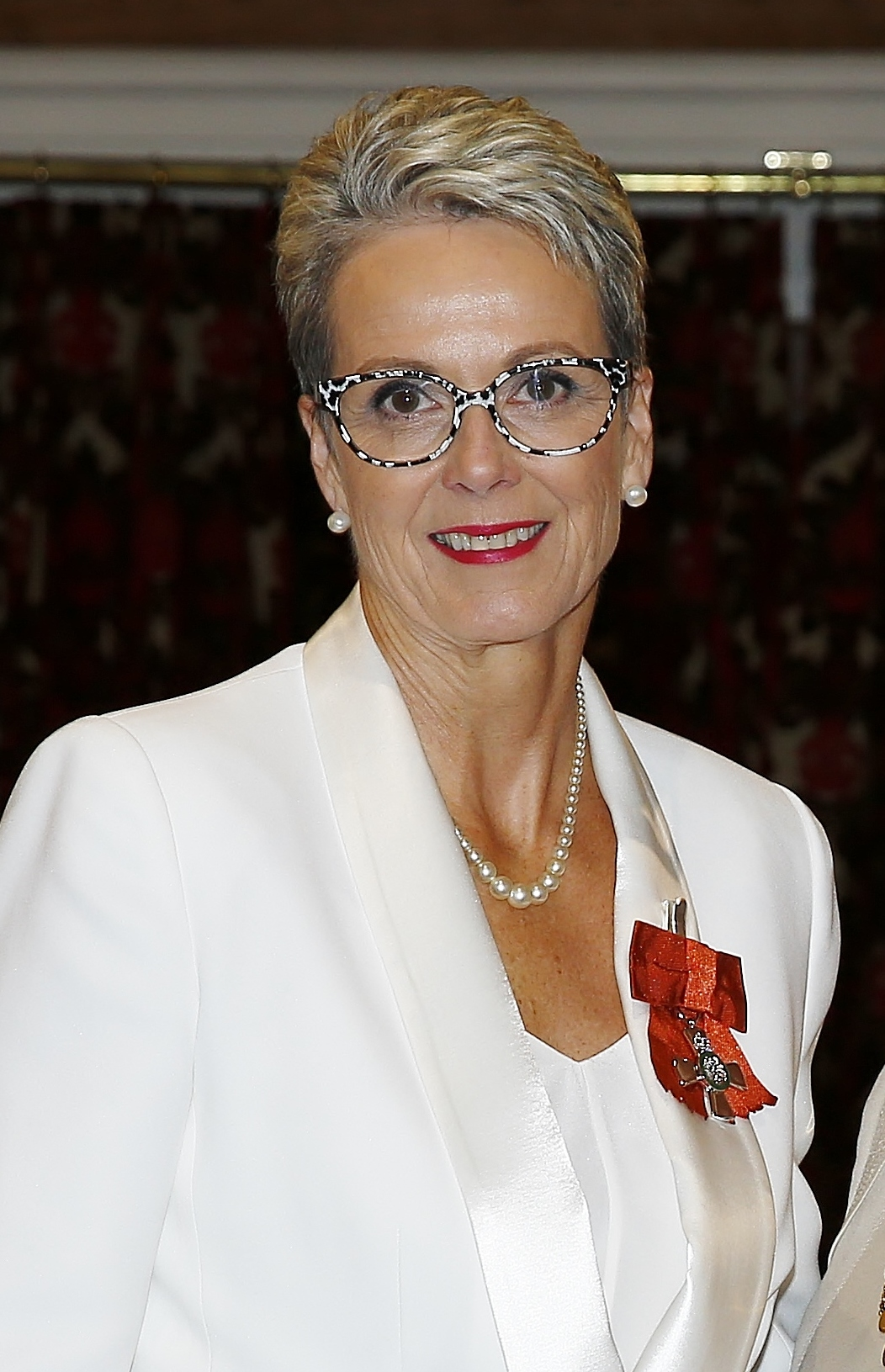
Liz Dawson

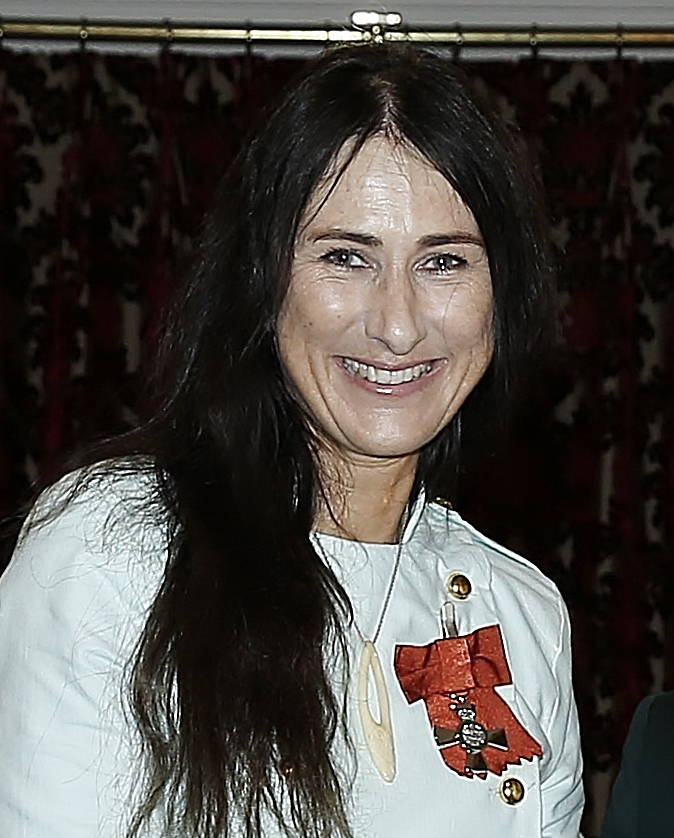
Merenia Donne

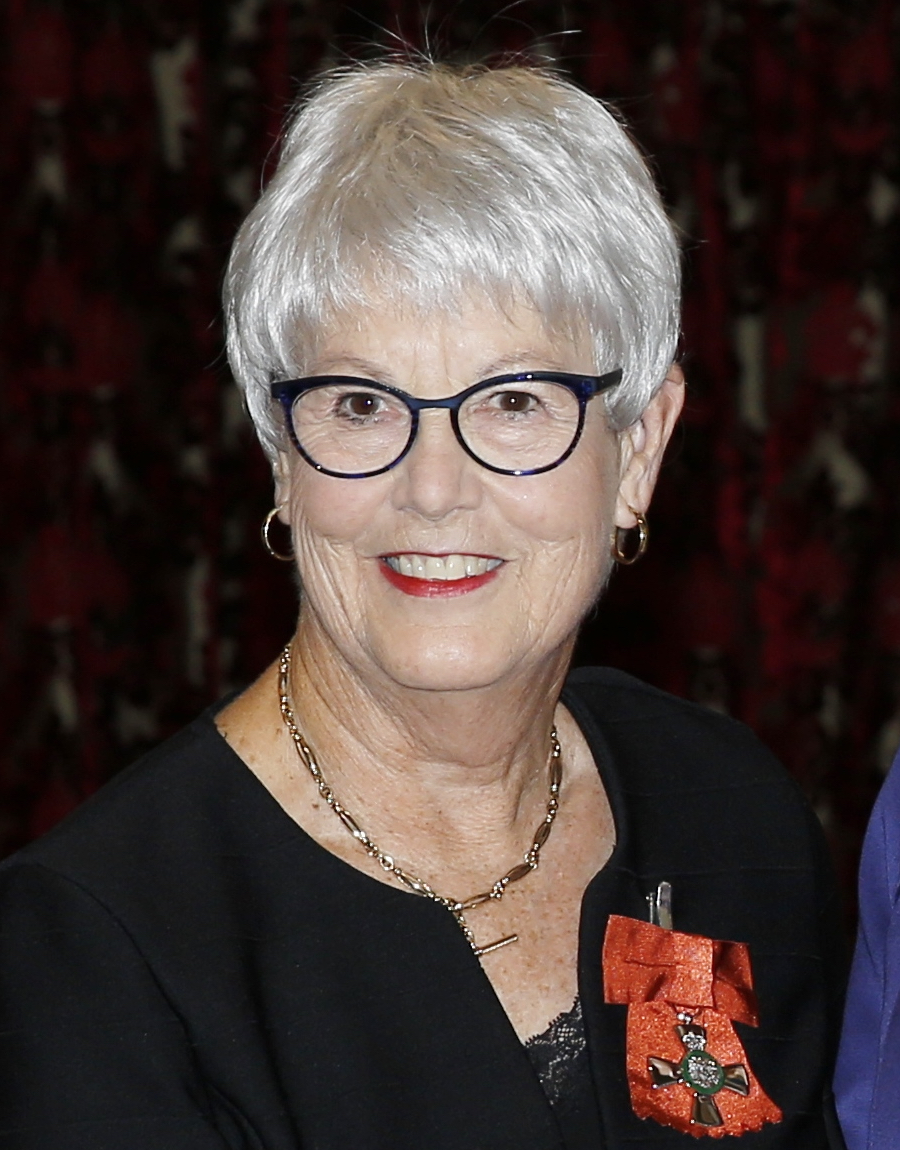
Jenny Ellis

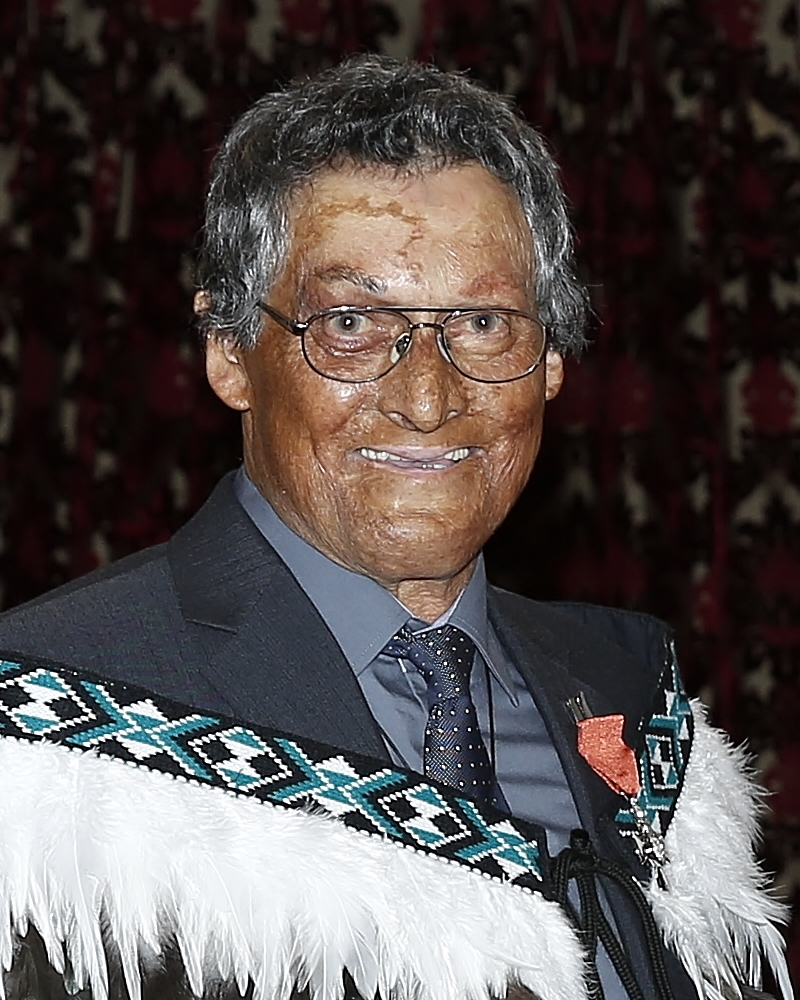
Denis Hartley

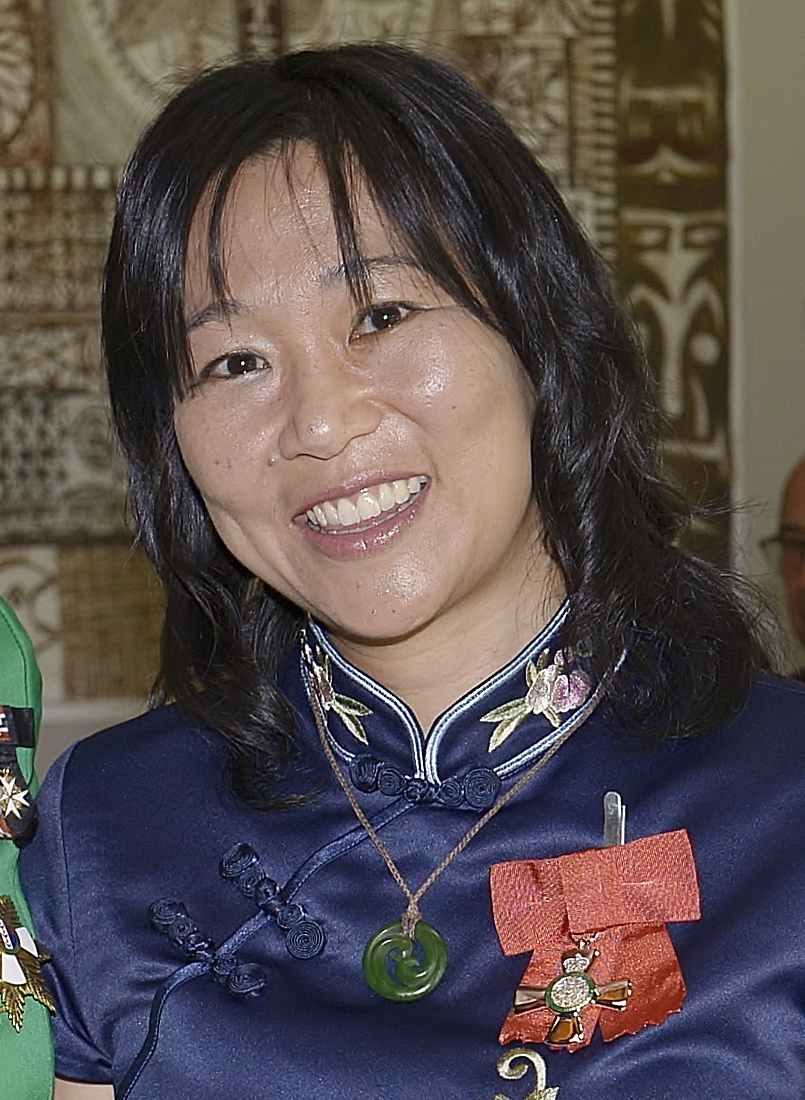
Renee Liang

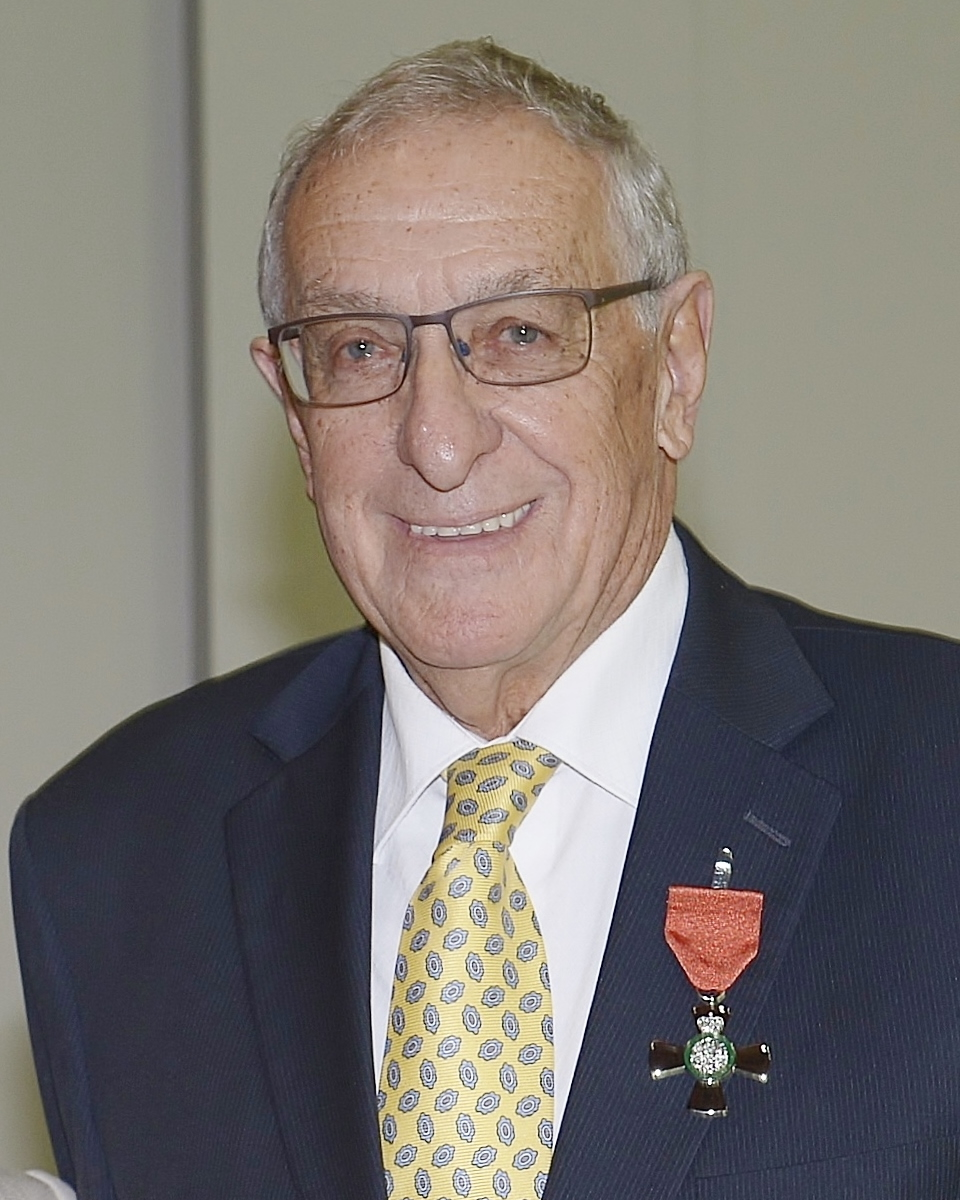
John Mace

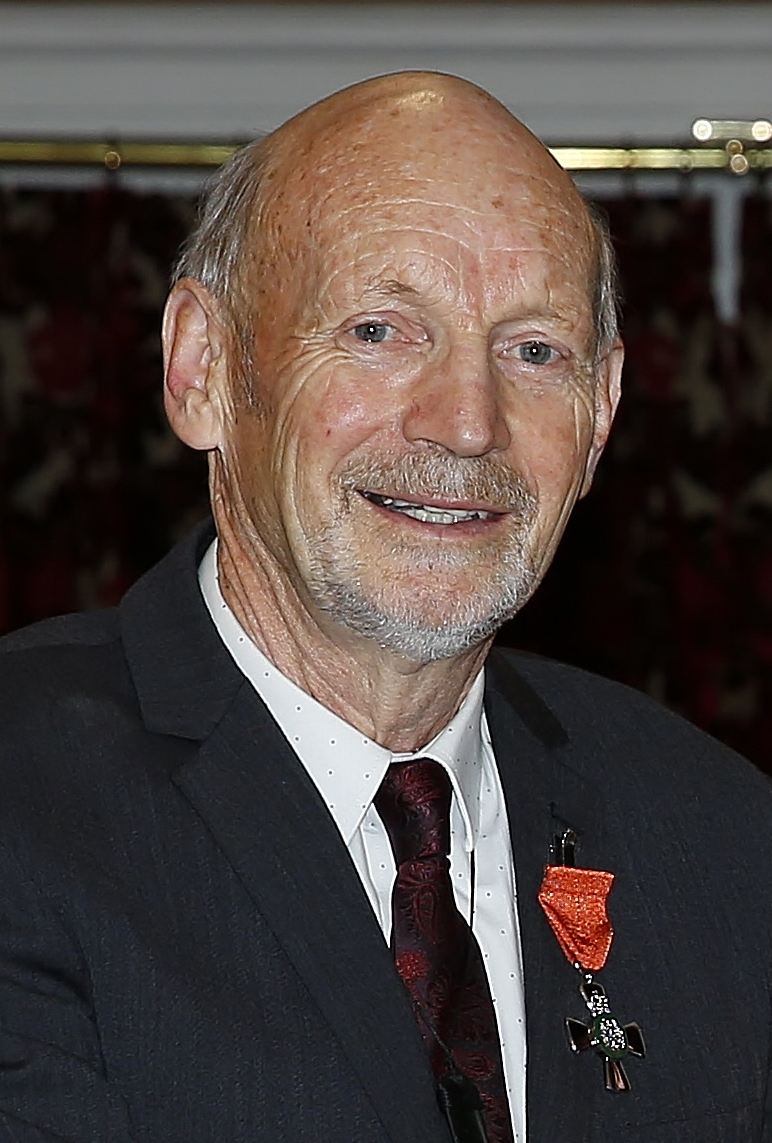
Neville Peat

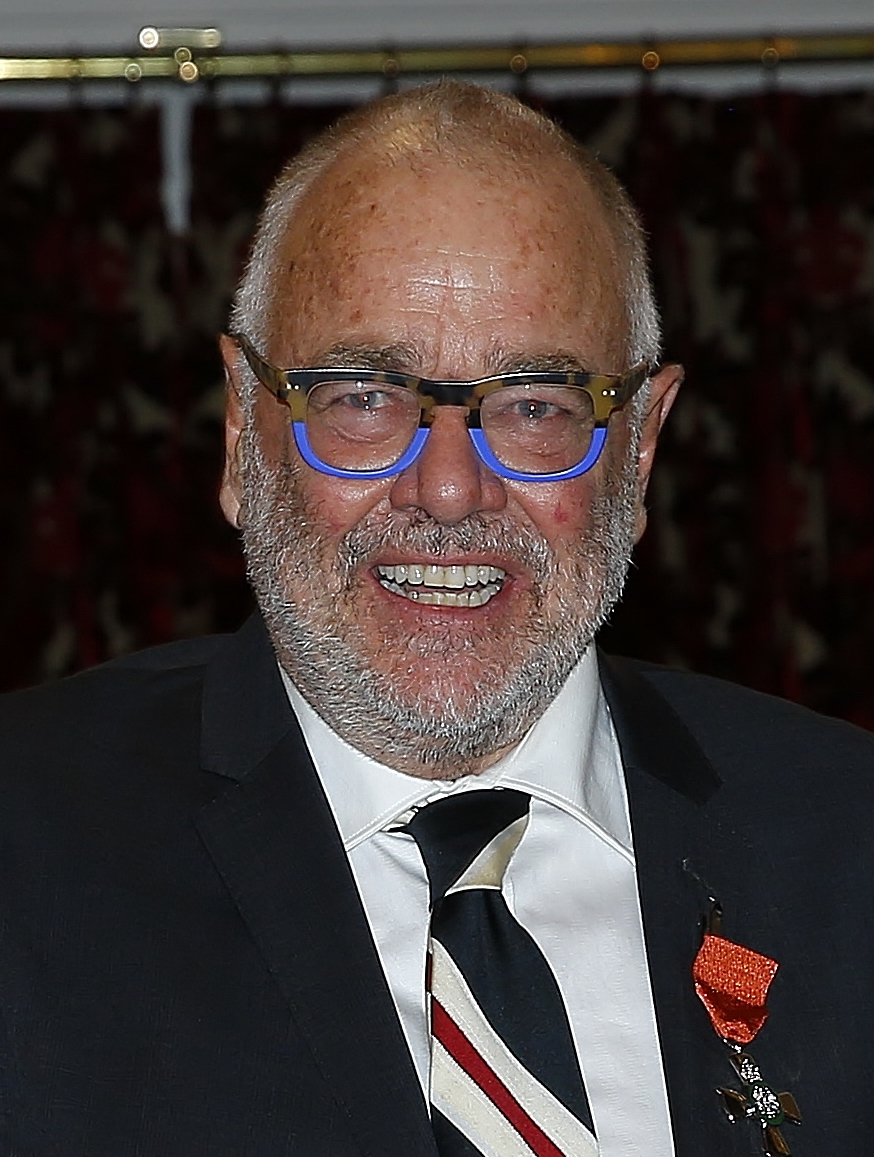
Bruce "Pic" Picot

Lisa Reihana

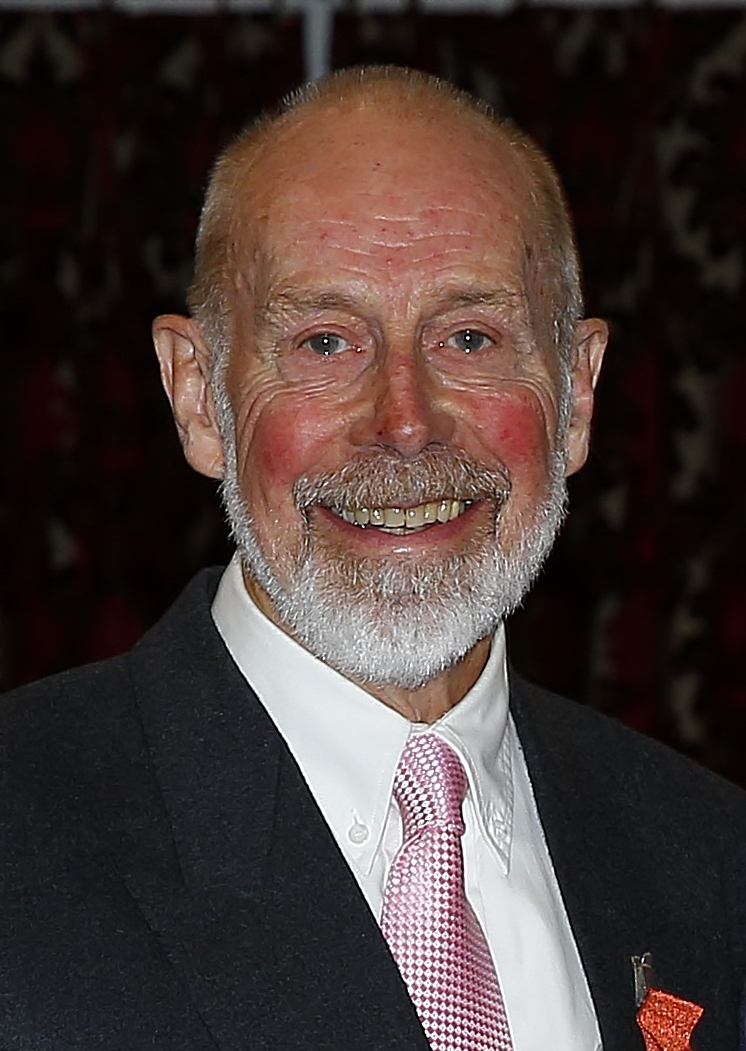
Lloyd Scott

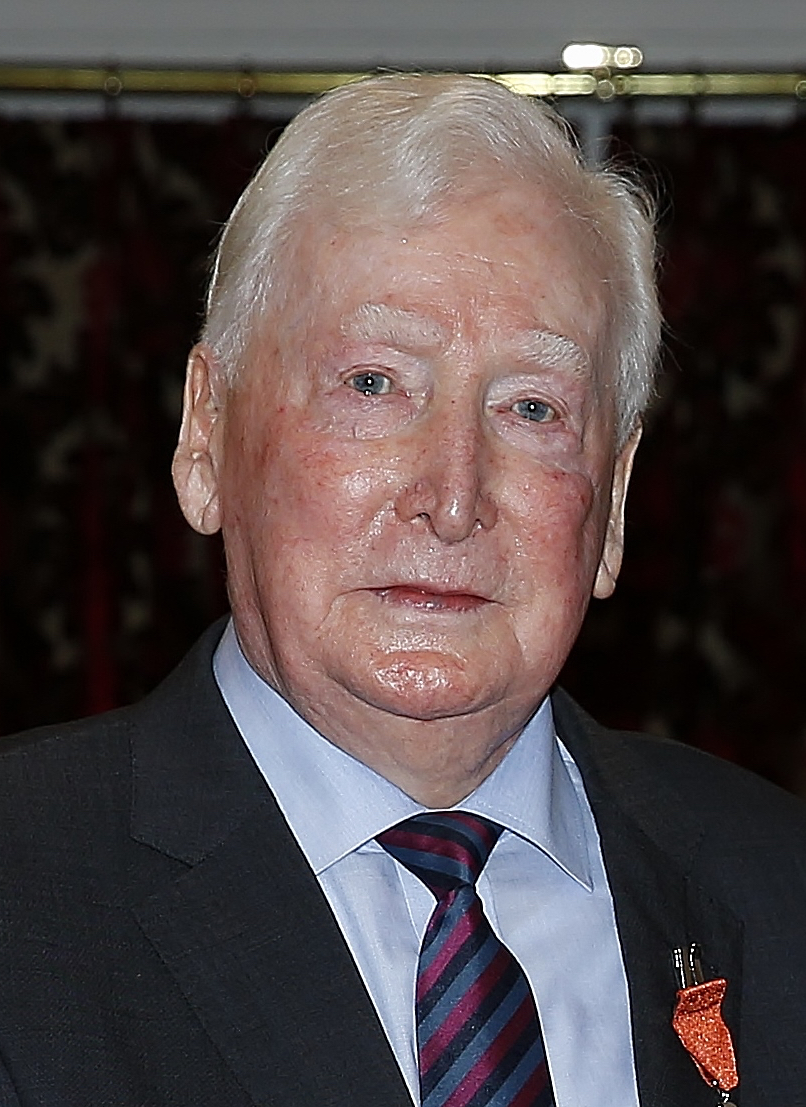
Philip Sherry

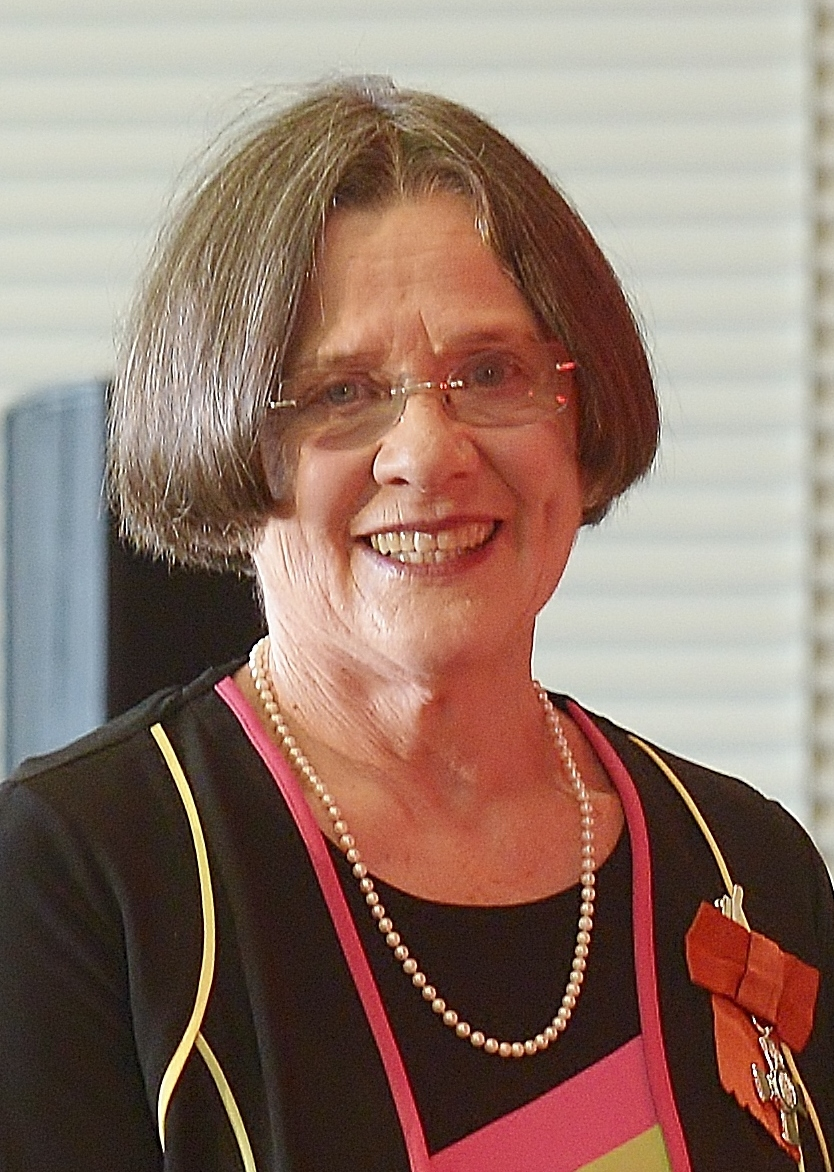
Maureen Truman

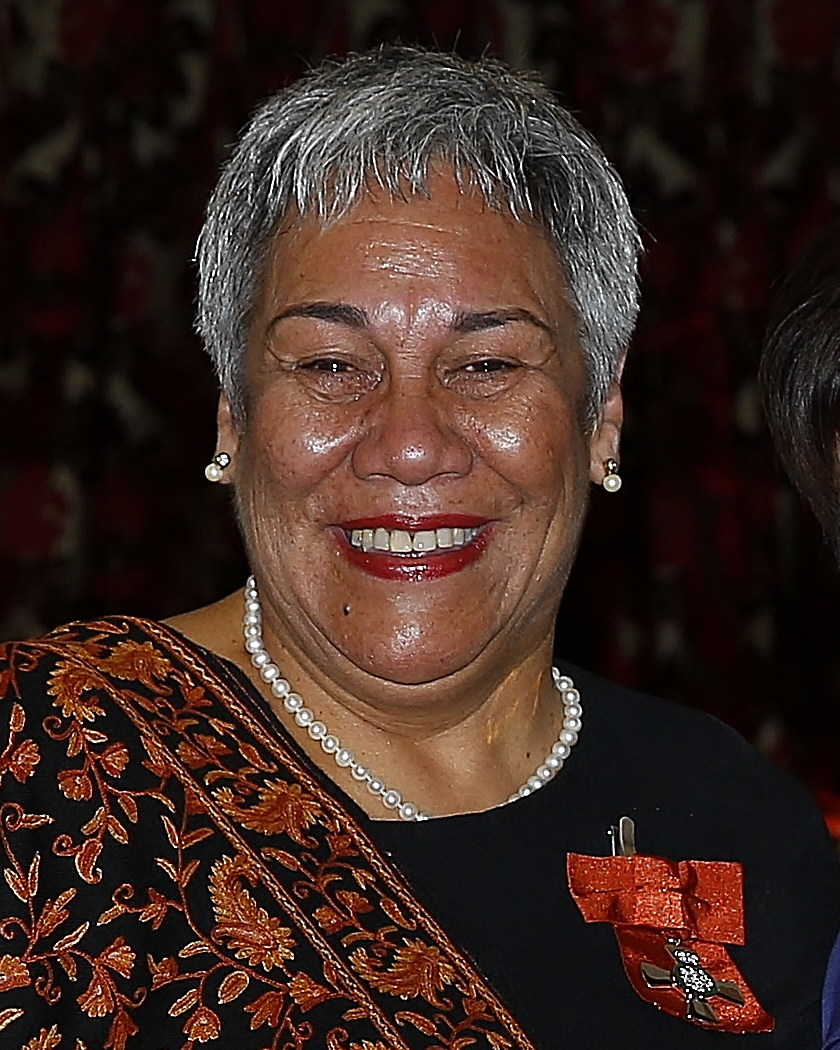
Pania Tyson-Nathan

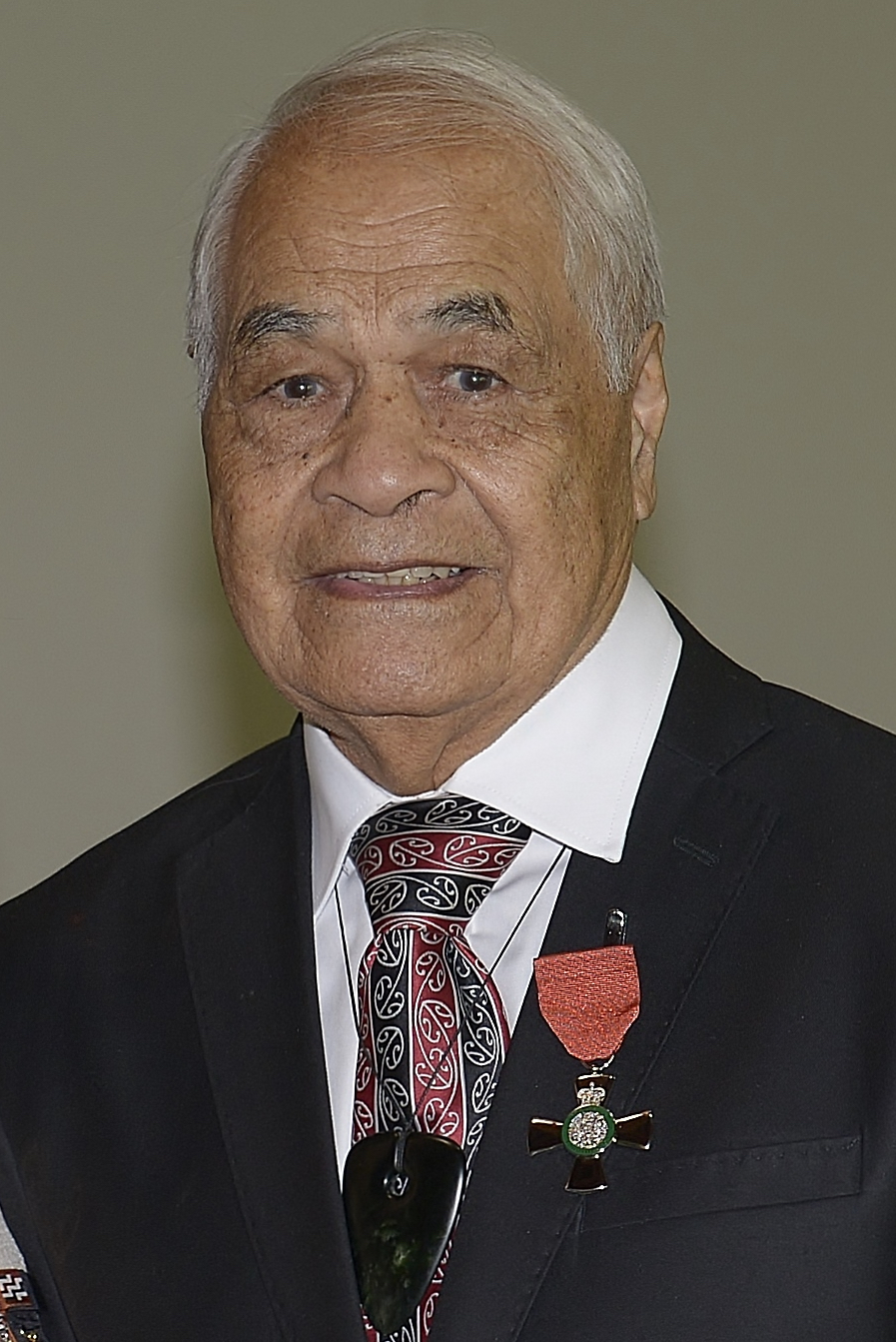
Haare Williams

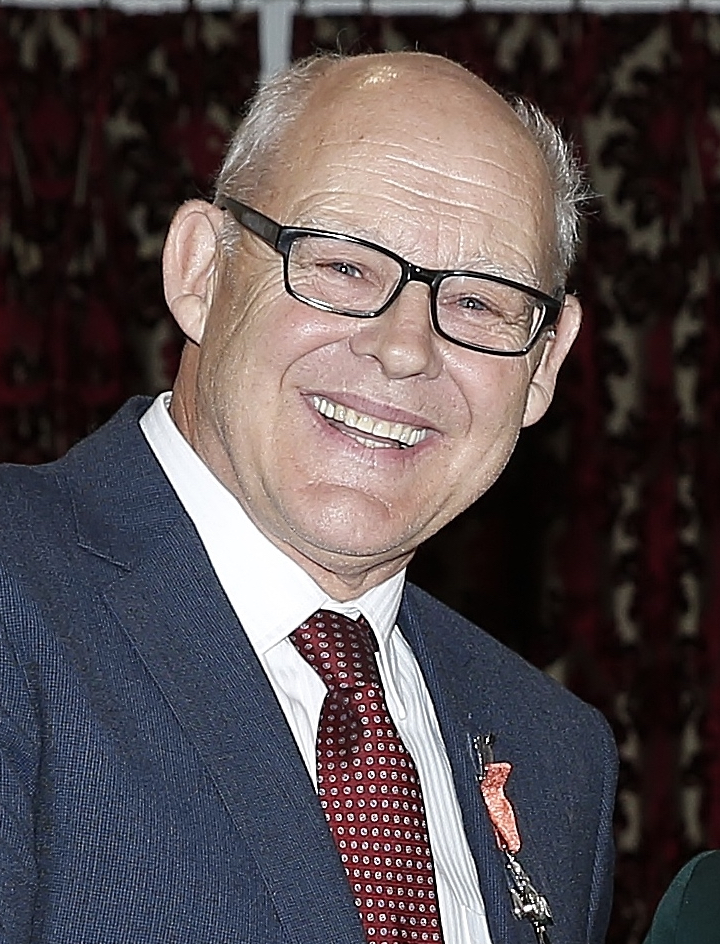
Ruud Kleinpaste

== Companion of the Queen's Service Order (QSO) ==
- The Honourable Kerry James Borrows – of Hāwera. For services as a member of Parliament.
- Michael Joseph Brown – of Lower Hutt. For services to governance.
- The Honourable David Richard Cunliffe – of Auckland. For services as a member of Parliament.
- Jane Louise Drumm – of Auckland. For services to victims of domestic violence.
- Robert John Fowler – of Auckland. For services to the community.
- Raewyn Christine Fox – of Porirua. For services to family budgeting services and the community.
- The Right Honourable The Lord Geidt GCB GCVO OBE PC – of London, United Kingdom. For services as private secretary to The Queen of New Zealand.
- David Smol – of Wellington. For services to the State.
- William Lindsay Tisch JP – of Matamata. For services as a member of Parliament.
- Evelyn Marion Weir – of Hamilton. For services to seniors and the community.
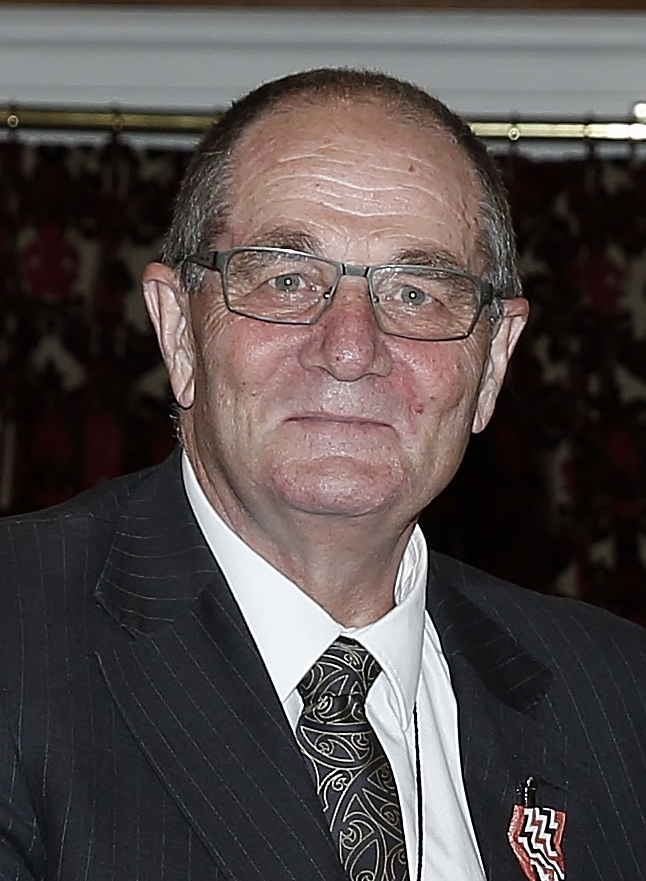
Chester Borrows

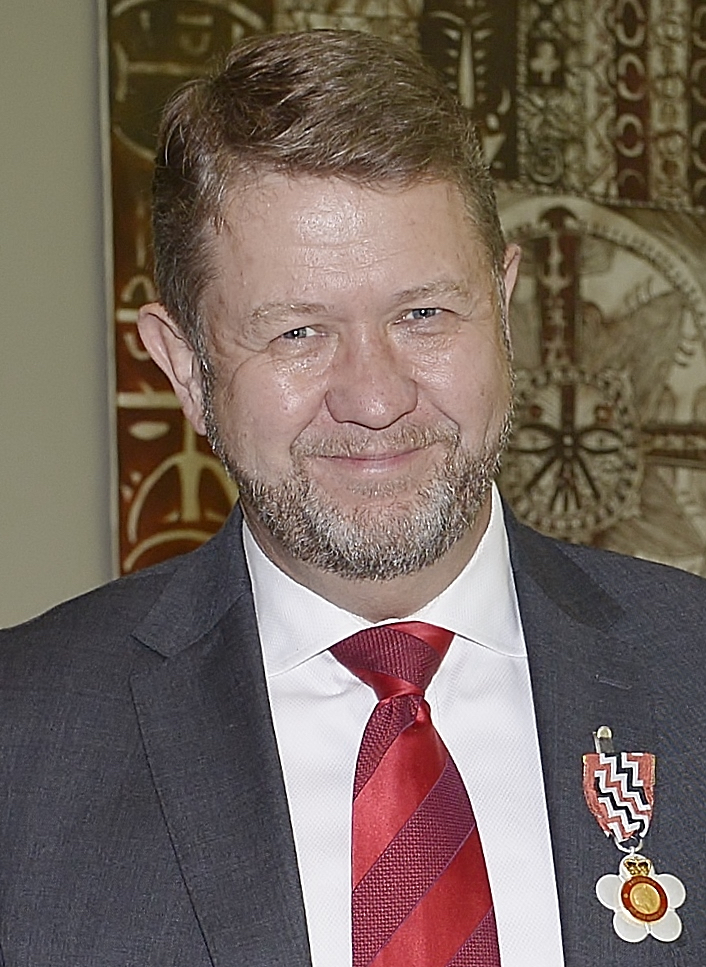
David Cunliffe

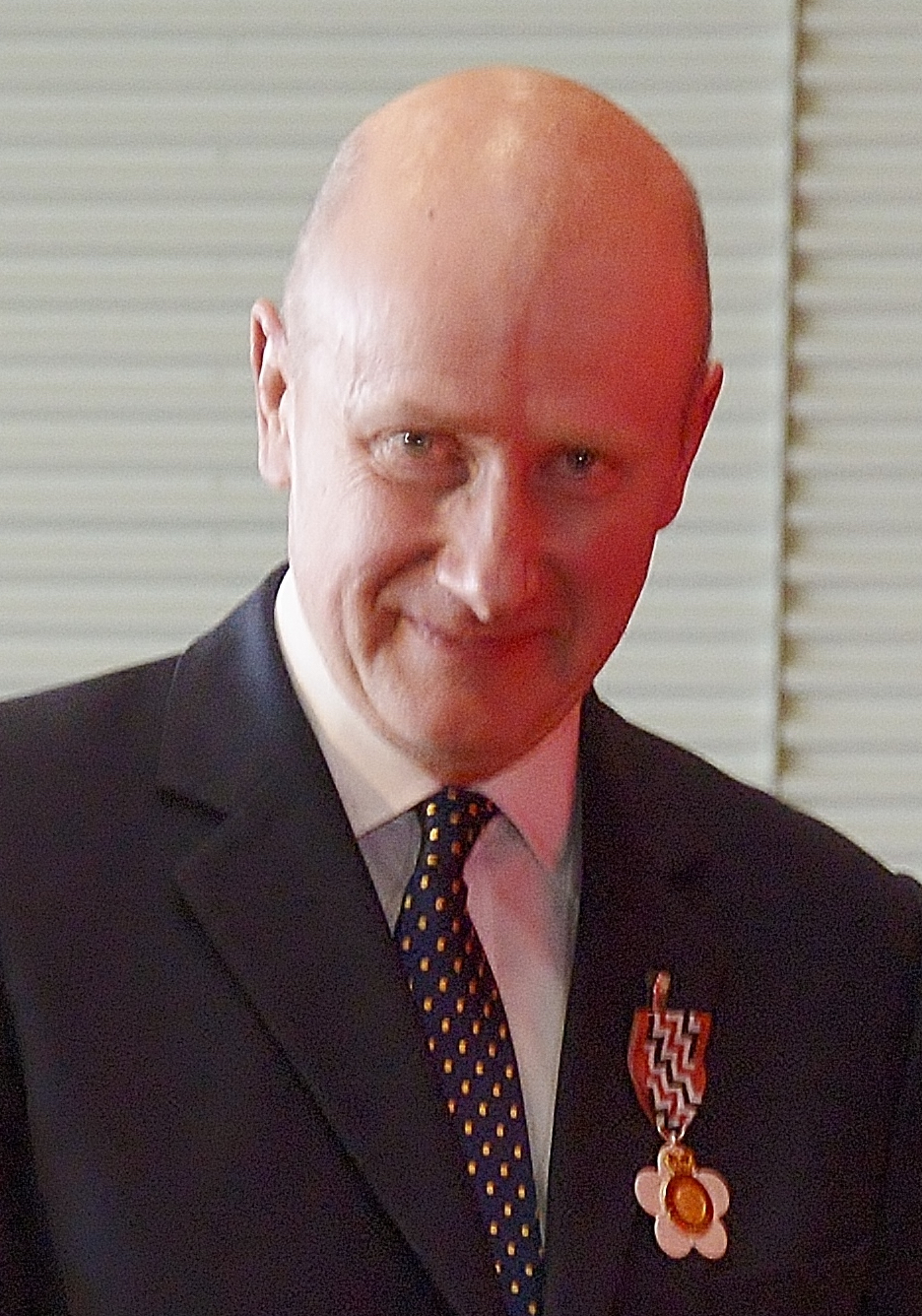
The Lord Geidt

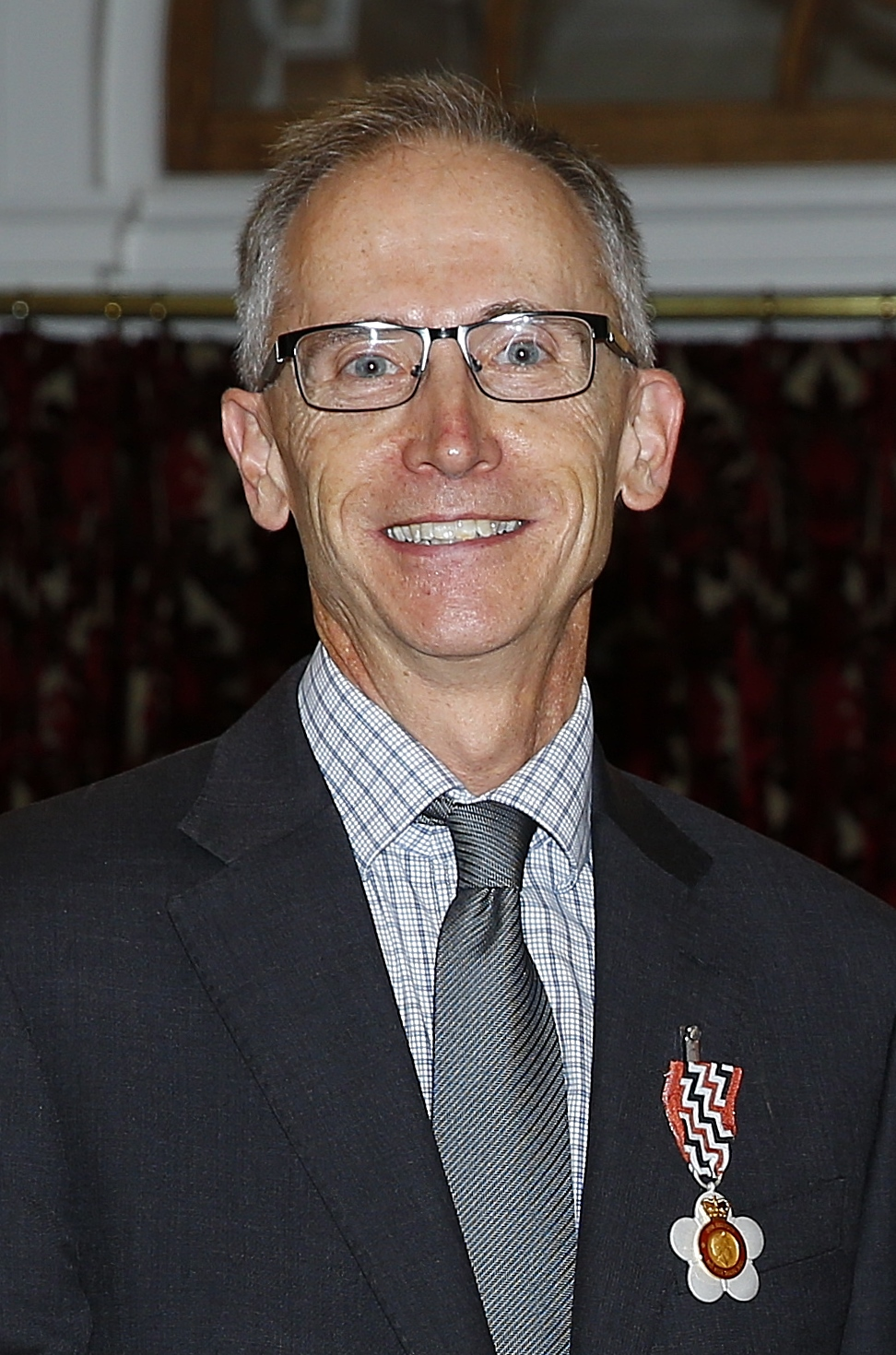
David Smol

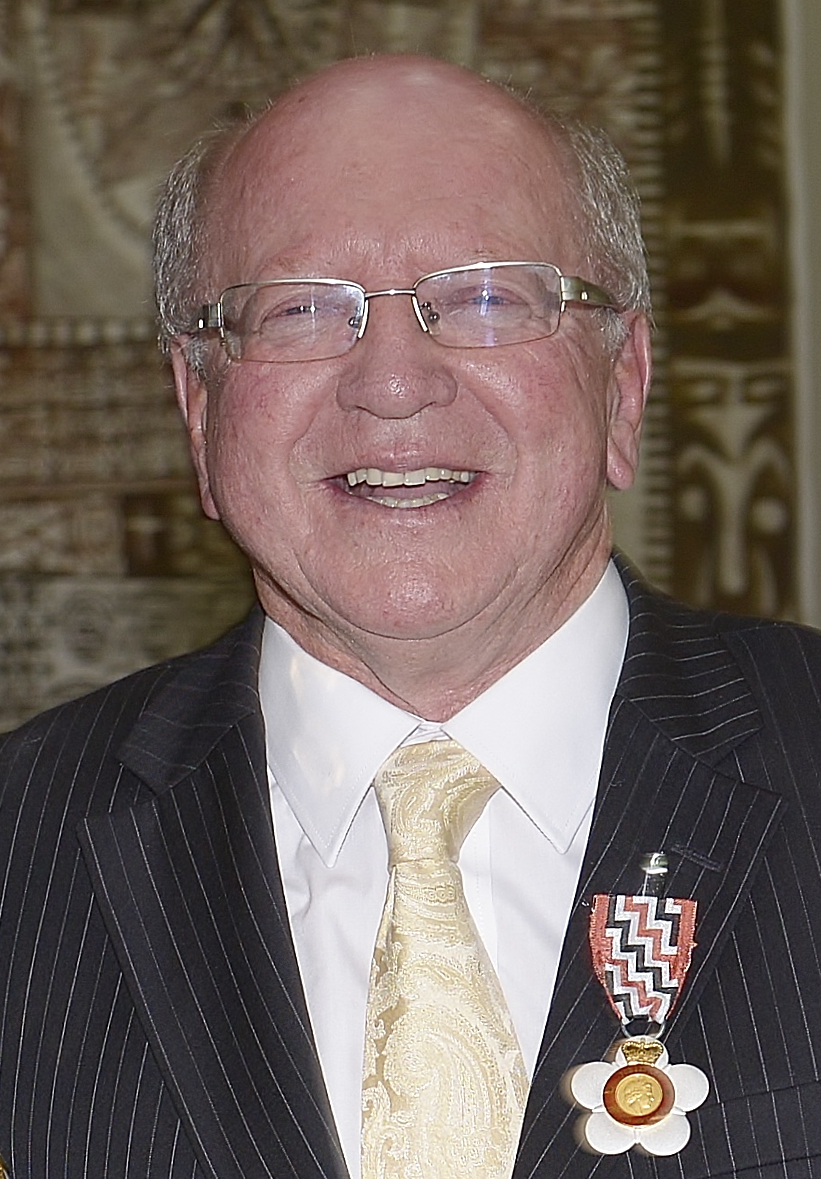
Lindsay Tisch

== Queen's Service Medal (QSM) ==
- Foumana Alene-Tumataiki – of Auckland. For services to the Niue community and education.
- Ian Rodney Anderson JP – of Luggate. For services to Fire and Emergency New Zealand and the community.
- Shona Evelyn Andrell – of Christchurch. For services to the stroke community.
- Ray Raman Annamalai JP – of Auckland. For services to the community and Tamil culture.
- Ian Hector Argyle – of Palmerston North. For services to outdoor recreation and conservation.
- Anne Elizabeth Ellen Darby Barnett – of Christchurch. For services to health education.
- Aidan Bennett – of Auckland. For services to the community.
- Raewyn Teresa Bhana JP – of Drury. For services to the community.
- Diane Margaret Brown – of Ngāruawāhia. For services to the community and sport.
- Carrol Eileen Browne – of Fox Glacier. For services to the community.
- John Alban Bull – of Coromandel. For services to Fire and Emergency New Zealand.
- Donald Harvey Cameron – of Christchurch. For services to Fire and Emergency New Zealand and the community.
- Daniel Christopher Clinton Corry – of Leeston. For services to the community.
- Philip John Craigie – of Dunedin. For services to music.
- Ian Morrice Dick JP – of Napier. For services to the community and local government.
- Frances Ina Diver – of Alexandra. For services to the community.
- Elizabeth Medwin Eastman – of Parapara. For services to the arts and the community.
- The Reverend Matiu Nohokau Eru – of Hastings. For services to Māori and education.
- Neil Murray Falconer JP – of Rangiora. For services to the community and broadcasting.
- Roderick George Farrow – of Whakatāne. For services to Fire and Emergency New Zealand and the forestry industry.
- Kathleen Patricia Fletcher – of Waipukurau. For services to music, science education, and the community.
- Lynnette Flowers – of Hamilton. For services to the community.
- Bruce Arrol Gordon – of Ngatea. For services to local government and the community.
- Lesley Elizabeth Gordon OStJ – of Ngatea. For services to the community.
- Parshotam Govind – of Auckland. For services to the Indian community.
- Leslie John Graham – of Masterton. For services to brass bands.
- Kathleen Isobel Greenwood – of Wellsford. For services to the community.
- Alfred Warwick Grimmer – of Dunedin. For services as a charity auctioneer and to the community.
- Dr Jean Morag Hardy – of Auckland. For services to paediatrics and the community.
- Joan Colwyn Howse – of Whangārei. For services to women and the community.
- Melissa Genevieve Compton Jebson – of Darfield. For services to agriculture and the community.
- Michael John Mason Keefe JP – of Rotorua. For services to the community.
- Graham Arthur Keep – of Oamaru. For services to Scouting and the community.
- Myra Larcombe – of Opua. For services to swimming.
- Brian Robert Le Prou – of Ōpunake. For services to Fire and Emergency New Zealand.
- Lorraine Melville Logan – of Christchurch. For services to music.
- Filipo Lui – of Lower Hutt. For services to the Tokelauan community.
- Thelma Margaret Luxton – of Waitara. For services to the community and cricket.
- Daniel Walmar Lyders – of Outram. For services to conservation and forestry.
- Hinekakaho Averill Manuel-Kohn – of Wairoa. For services to the community and Māori.
- Margaret Ann Miles JP – of Auckland. For services to local government and the community.
- Margaret Emily Morrish – of Lincoln. For services to heritage preservation.
- Hardie Gary Murdoch – of Dargaville. For services to Fire and Emergency New Zealand and the community.
- James William Nicholas – of Blenheim. For services to sport and the community.
- Diane Patricia Nutsford – of Timaru. For services to people with Alzheimer's and dementia.
- Inga Nu'u JP – of Auckland. For services to the community.
- Teresea Olsen – of Lower Hutt. For services to Māori and health.
- Sepal Channa Ranasinghe – of Wellington. For services to the Sri Lankan community.
- Philip Ian Smith – of Tongariro National Park. For services to Fire and Emergency New Zealand and the community.
- Arthur James Snedden – of Waiuku. For services to Fire and Emergency New Zealand.
- Patricia Mary Stafford-Bush JP – of Auckland. For services to the community.
- Julie Patricia Syme – of Kaikōura. For services to the community.
- Ross Murray Thorby – of Auckland. For services to the community.
- Mii Hinarere I Te Poerava Tupangaia JP – of Lower Hutt. For services to the Cook Islands community.
- Alan George Turner – of Tauranga. For services to the game of bridge.
- Jillian Marie Walker – of Rotorua. For services to art and children.
- Cynthia Ruth Ward – of Hamilton. For services to nursing and children's health.
- The Reverend Rereamanu Patana Wihapi – of Te Puke. For services to Māori.
- Richard Francis Williams – of Lower Hutt. For services to the State.
- Lyndsay Stanton Wright – of Greytown. For services to swimming.

Honorary

- Sereana Comeke Phillipps – of Masterton. For services to the Fijian community.
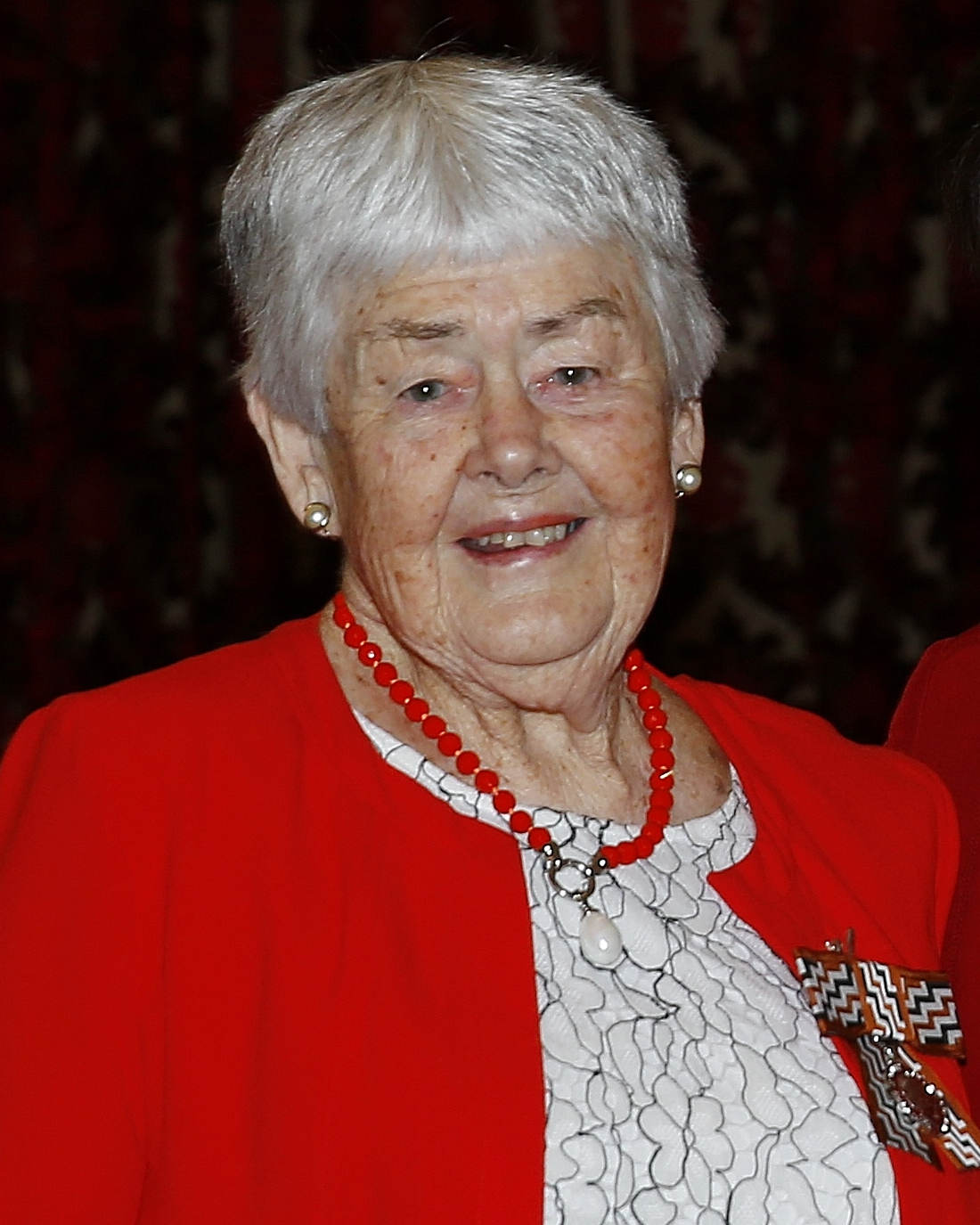
Shona Andrell

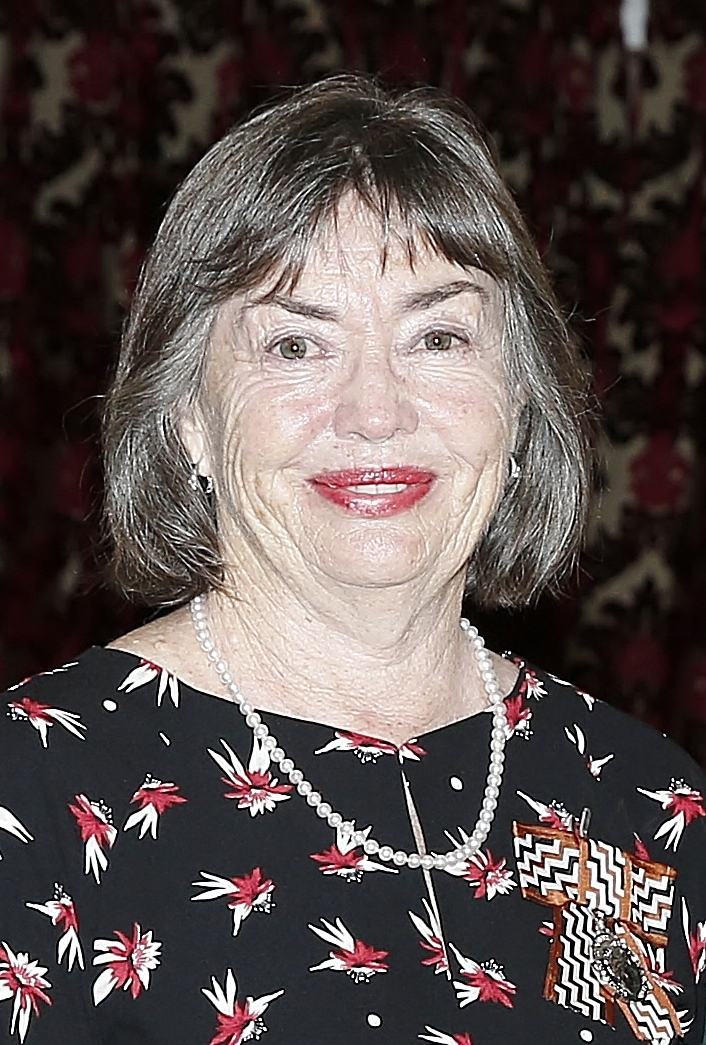
Carrol Browne

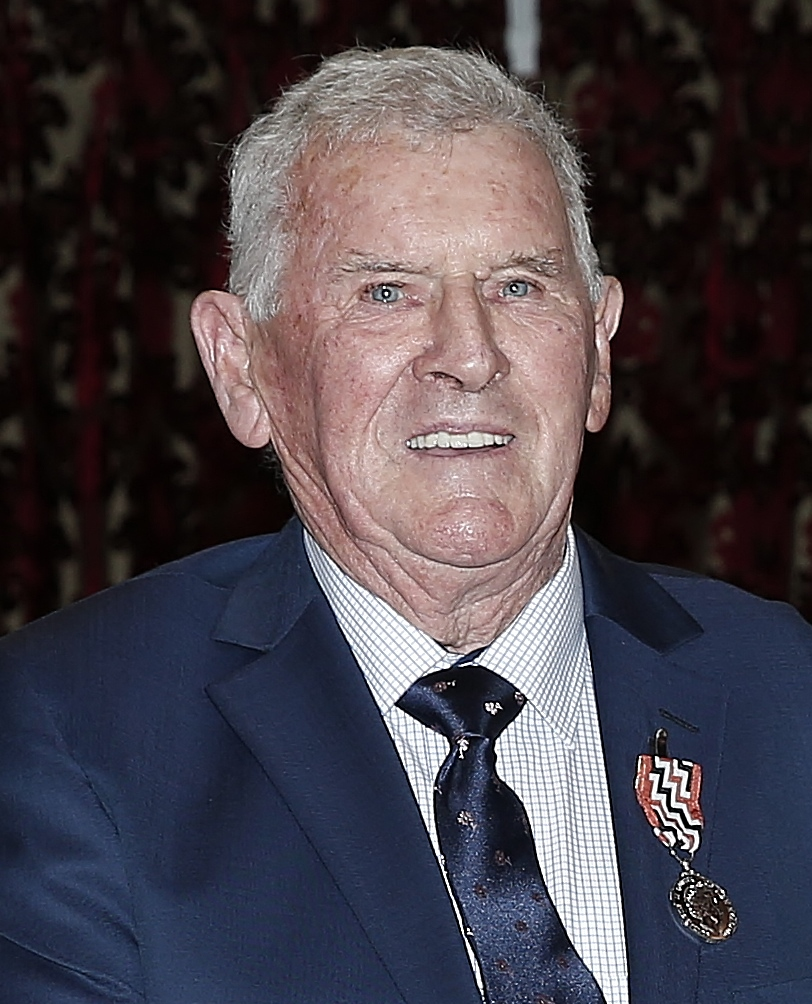
Ian Dick

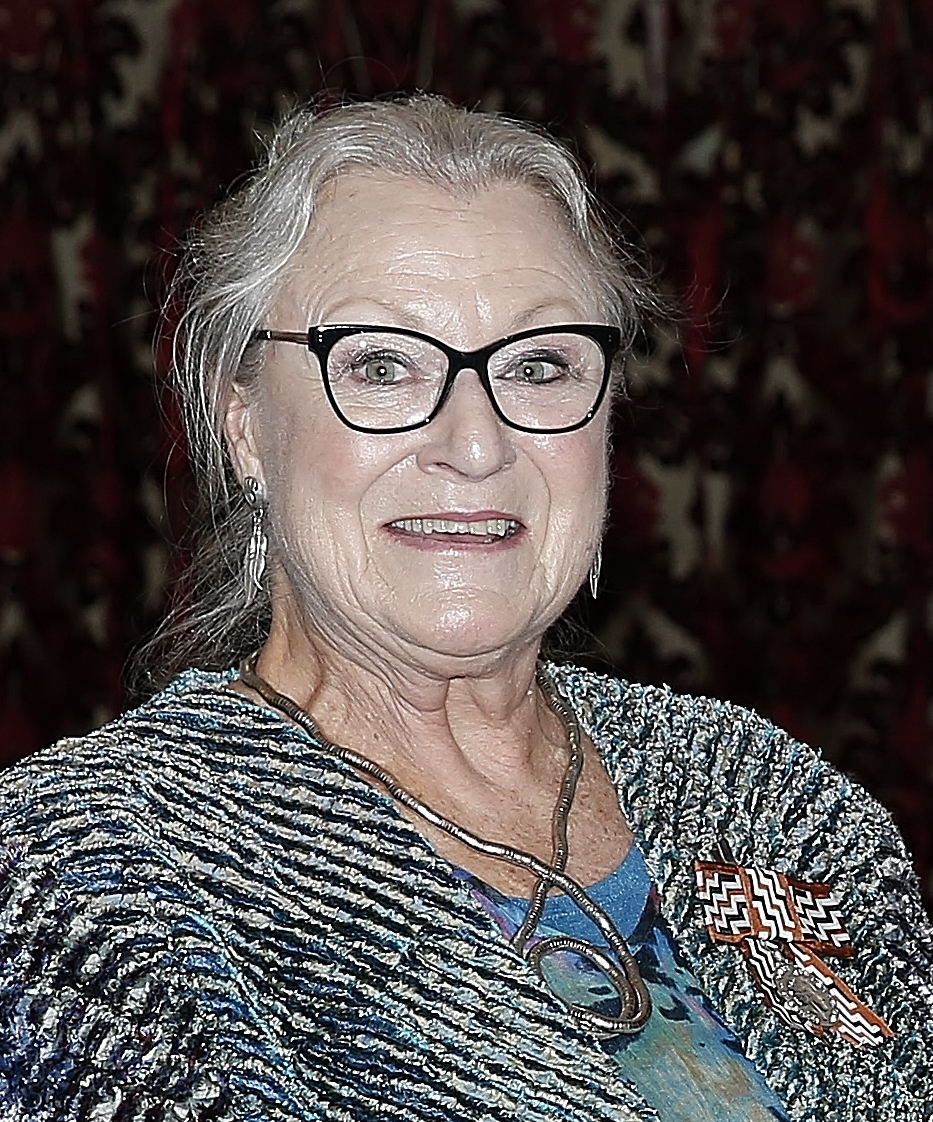
Liza Eastman

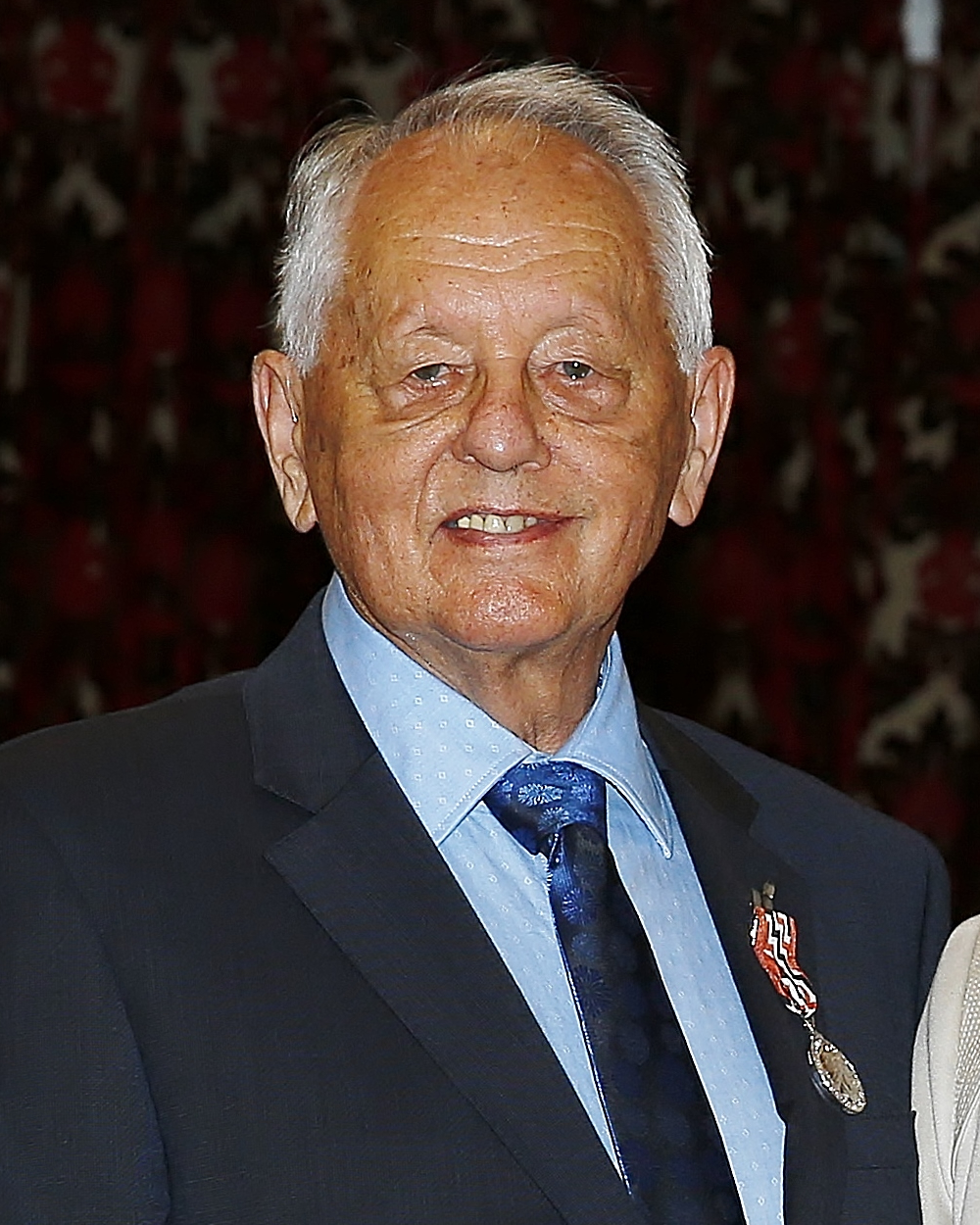
Rod Farrow

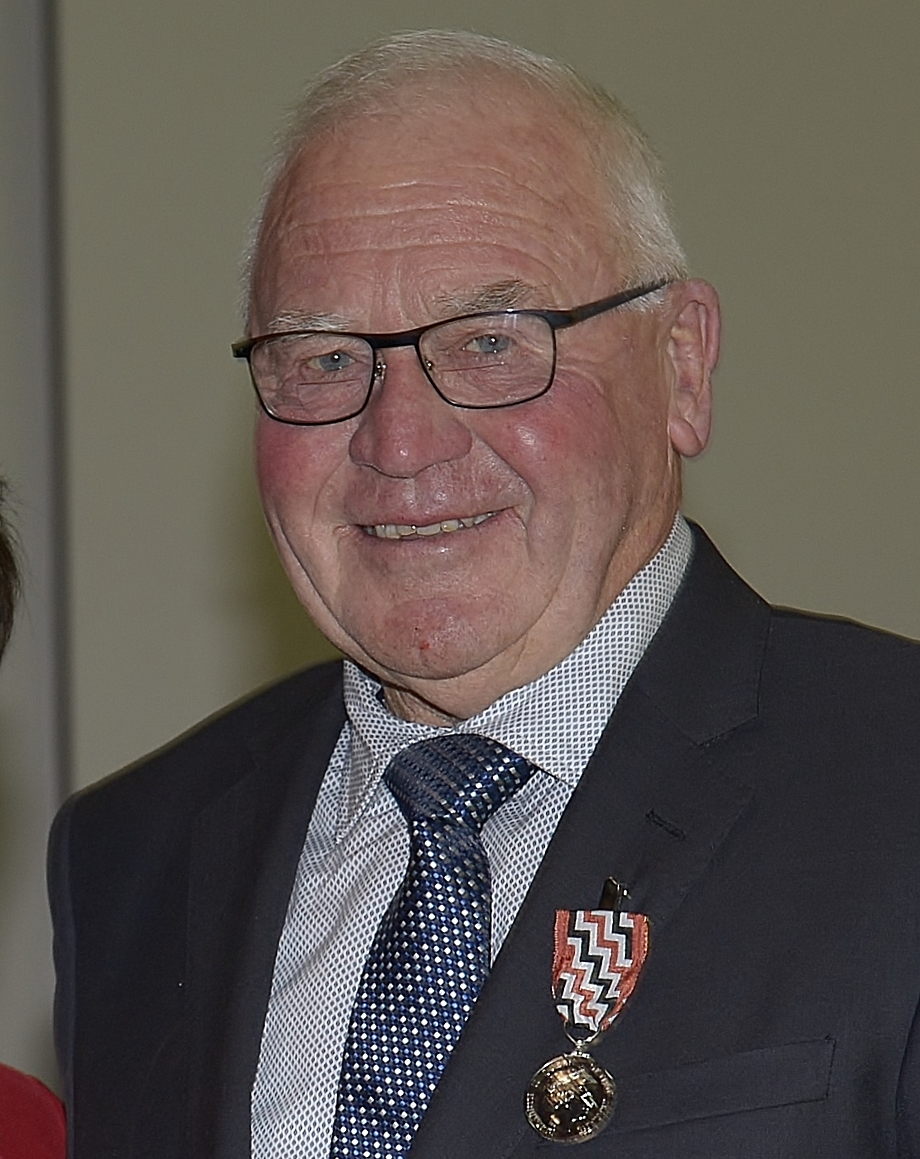
Bruce Gordon

Lesley Gordon

Graham Keep

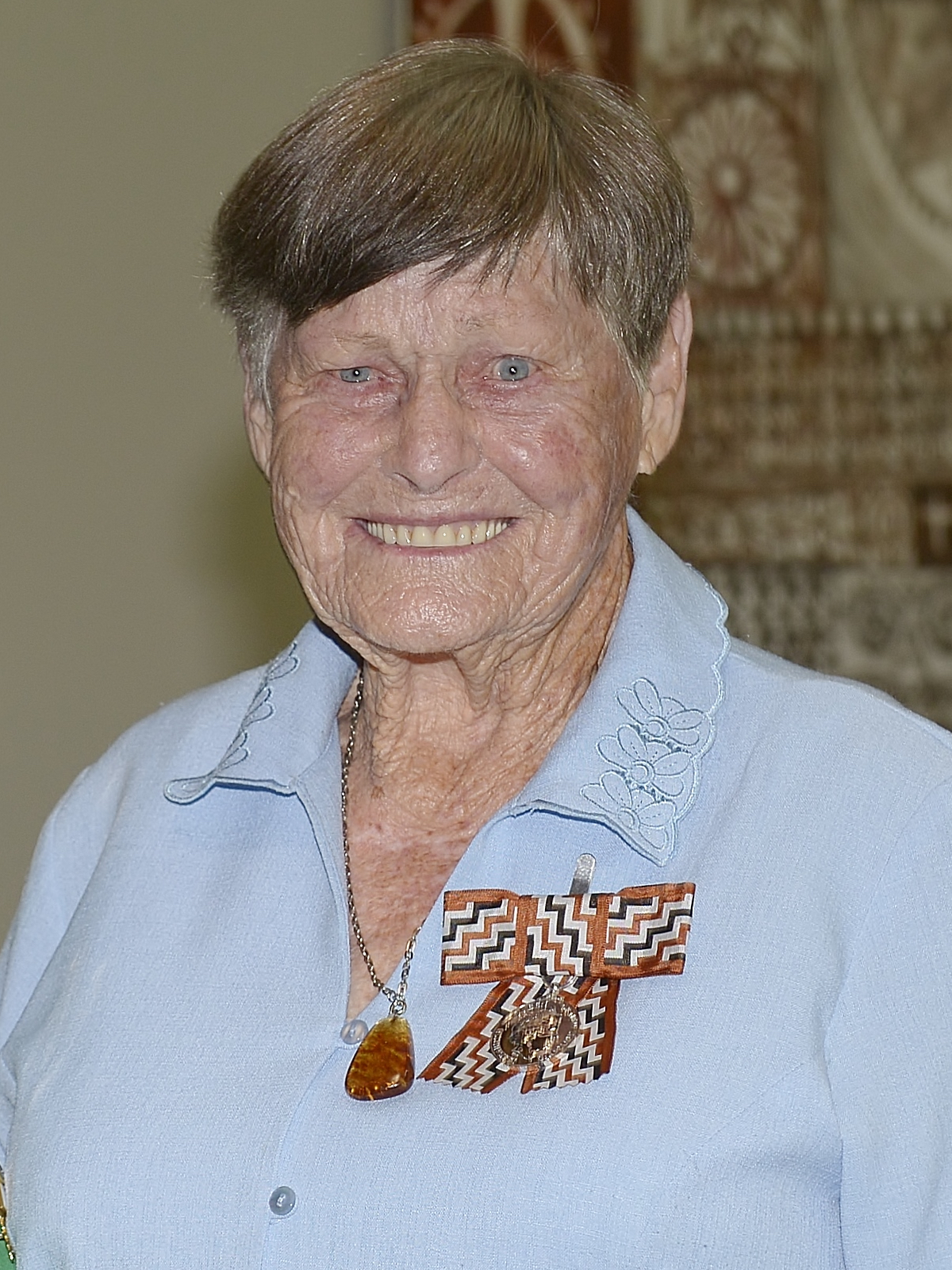
Myra Larcombe

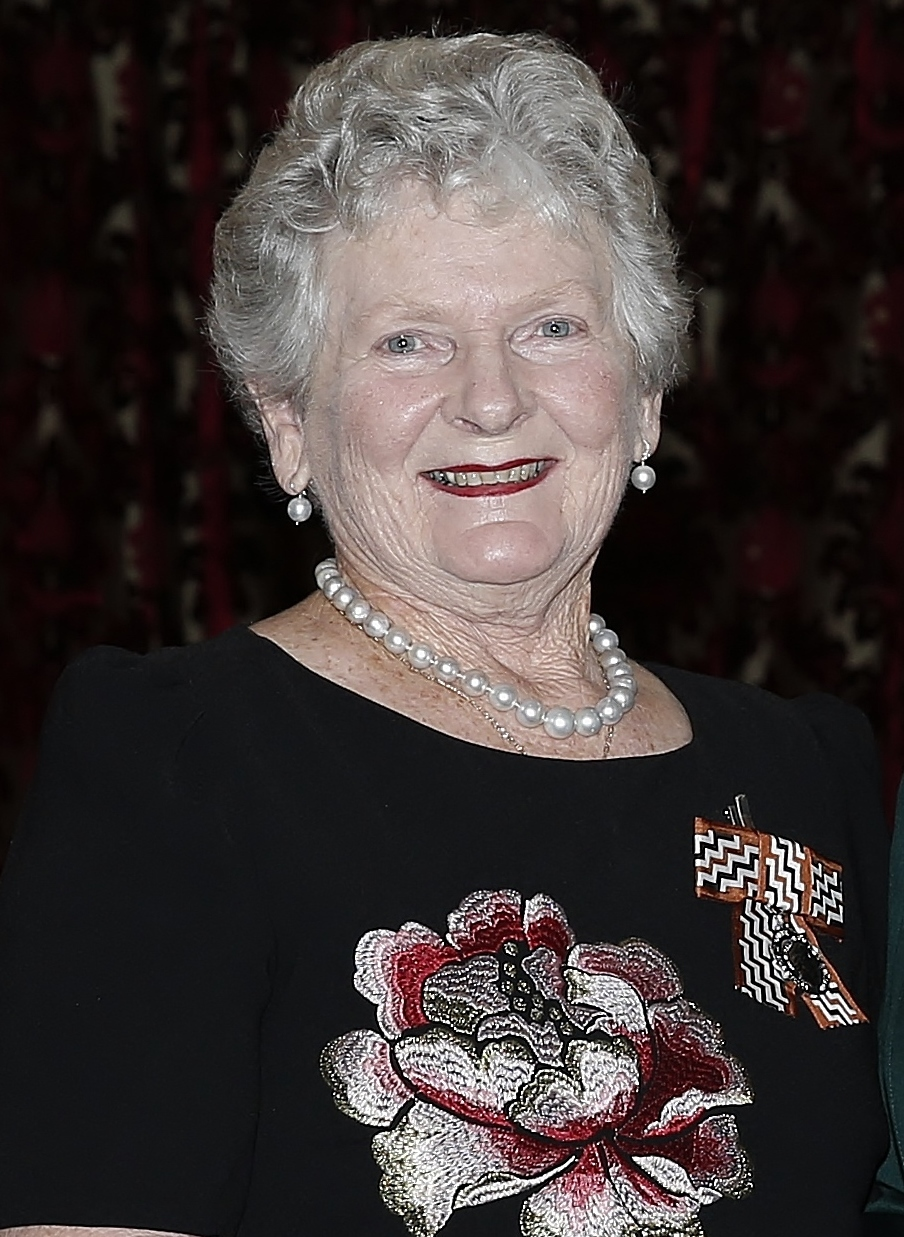
Julie Syme

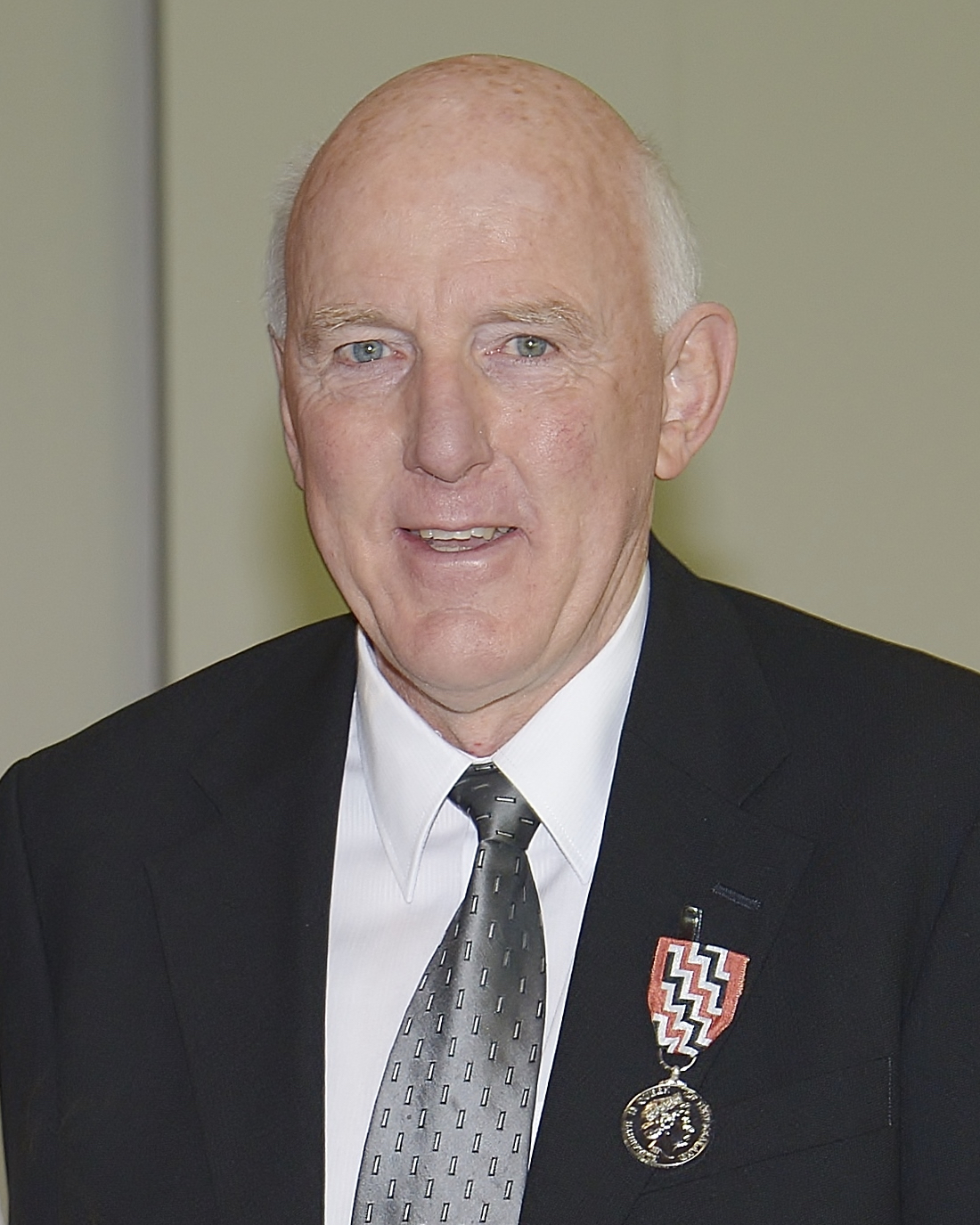
Alan Turner

== New Zealand Distinguished Service Decoration (DSD) ==
- Squadron Leader Rhys Lloyd Evans – of Auckland. For services to the New Zealand Defence Force.
