= Bronwen Connor =

New Zealand neuroscientist

Bronwen Connor MNZM
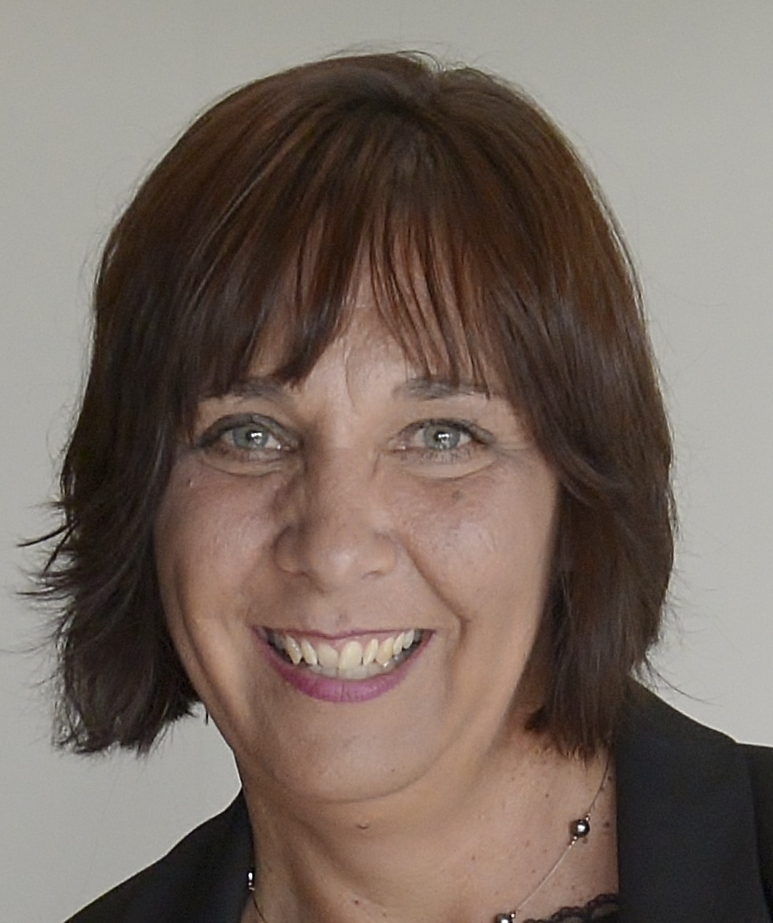
- Connor in 2018
- Education: University of Auckland
- Awards: NEXT (2013); Member of the New Zealand Order of Merit (2018)
- Scientific career
- Fields: Neuropharmacology
- Workplaces: University of Auckland
- Thesis: The role of neurotrophic factors in neurodegenerative disorders of the human brain (1997)
- Doctoral advisor: Richard Faull; Mike Dragunow
- Website: University profile

Bronwen Jane Connor MNZM is a New Zealand academic. She is a professor of pharmacology at the University of Auckland, where she is head of the Neural Reprogramming and Repair Lab.

== Academic career ==
Connor's father has degrees in engineering and physics, and so she "grew up in a house with science". She had originally planned to major in exercise science at university, due to her love of rowing, but became hooked on neurology. Connor completed a Bachelor of Science in pharmacology and physiology in 1994. She followed this with a PhD titled The role of neurotrophic factors in neurodegenerative disorders of the human brain at the University of Auckland. Connor then undertook postdoctoral research at Northwestern University in Chicago, where she investigated gene therapy for Parkinson's disease. She joined the faculty at the University of Auckland in 2000, rising to full professor in 2019.

Connor researches neurological diseases such as Parkinson's disease, Huntington's disease, multiple sclerosis, stroke and depression. Her work focuses on identifying the pathways through which the diseases develop, and trying to identify therapeutic targets for stem cell therapy or gene therapy. Connor's work has pioneered the transformation of a patient's own adult skin cells into neural stem cells, which can then be used in treatment without the risk of immune rejection.

== Honours and awards ==
In 2013, Connor was awarded the NEXT Woman of the Year Health and Science Award.

In the 2018 Queen's Birthday Honours, Connor was appointed a Member of the New Zealand Order of Merit, for services to the treatment of neurological disorders.

== Selected works ==
- B Connor; M Dragunow (1 June 1998), The role of neuronal growth factors in neurodegenerative disorders of the human brain, vol. 27, pp. 1–39, doi:10.1016/s0165-0173(98)00004-6, PMID 9639663, Wikidata Q74697359
- Bronwen Connor; Young D; Yan Q; Faull RL; Synek B; Dragunow M (1 October 1997). "Brain-derived neurotrophic factor is reduced in Alzheimer's disease". Molecular Brain Research. 49 (1–2): 71–81. doi:10.1016/s0169-328x(97)00125-3. ISSN 0169-328X. PMID 9387865. Wikidata Q48591280.
- Maurice Curtis; Ellen B Penney; Andree G Pearson; Willeke M C van Roon-Mom; Niqi J Butterworth; Michael Dragunow; Bronwen Connor; Richard Faull (9 July 2003). "Increased cell proliferation and neurogenesis in the adult human Huntington's disease brain". Proceedings of the National Academy of Sciences of the United States of America. 100 (15): 9023–9027. Bibcode:2003PNAS..100.9023C. doi:10.1073/pnas.1532244100. ISSN 0027-8424. PMC 166431. PMID 12853570. Wikidata Q35171498.
- M Walton; B Connor; P Lawlor; Deborah Young; E Sirimanne; P Gluckman; G Cole; M Dragunow (1 April 1999), Neuronal death and survival in two models of hypoxic-ischemic brain damage, vol. 29, pp. 137–168, doi:10.1016/s0165-0173(98)00053-8, PMID 10209230, Wikidata Q77343222
- Jane Evans; Yuhui Sun; Ailsa McGregor; Bronwen Connor (23 August 2012). "Allopregnanolone regulates neurogenesis and depressive/anxiety-like behaviour in a social isolation rodent model of chronic stress". Neuropharmacology. 63 (8): 1315–1326. doi:10.1016/j.neuropharm.2012.08.012. ISSN 0028-3908. PMID 22939998. Wikidata Q48134202.s
