= Chuard =

Chuard is a surname. Notable people with the surname include:

- Alain Chuard (fl. from 1994), Swiss entrepreneur and snowboarder
- Ernest Chuard (1857–1942), Swiss politician
- Léo Chuard (born 1998), Swiss ice hockey player
