= Ream Al-Hasani =

British neuroscientist and pharmacologist

- Born: United Kingdom
- Education: University of Portsmouth; University of Surrey
- Known for: Kappa opioid signalling in the negative affect associated with pain
- Awards: INRC Young Investigator Awards, Young Investigators Grants from the Brain and Behavior Research Foundation, "Pathway to Independence Award" from NIDA
- Scientific career
- Fields: Neuroscience, pharmacology
- Workplaces: Washington University in St. Louis

Ream Al-Hasani is a British neuroscientist and pharmacologist as well as an associate professor of anesthesiology at Washington University School of Medicine. Al-Hasani studies the endogenous opioid system to understand how to target it therapeutically to treat addiction, affective disorders, and chronic pain.

== Early life and education ==
Al-Hasani's family moved from Iraq to the UK before she was born, and Al-Hasani grew up in the United Kingdom. She was the only Muslim girl in her school, and though there were not many Middle Eastern role models in science, she became fascinated by the effects of drugs on the brain and decided to pursue a career in academia.

Al-Hasani graduated with an undergraduate degree in Pharmacology from the University of Portsmouth in the UK. She then held an internship at GlaxoSmithKline where she studied neurodegenerative diseases and neuroinflammation.

== Graduate work ==
Funded by the Medical Research Council, Al-Hasani pursued graduate studies at the University of Surrey in England. She was interested in exploring the interactions between adenosine and dopamine receptors in morphine addiction for her PhD, and sought co-mentorship from Ian Kitchen, Professor of Neuropharmacology, and Susanna Hourani, Professor of Pharmacology.

=== Endogenous opioids ===
In 2010, Al-Hasani and her colleagues in the Kitchen lab published a paper in the European Journal of Neuroscience exploring the influence of genetic variability on heroin addiction. When they compared a strain of highly inbred mice to typical control mice, they found that highly inbred mice had much higher sensitivity to the rewarding properties of heroin yet inbred did not display increased location upon administration of heroin unlike control mice. Heroin decreased mu opioid receptor (MOP-r) density in controls but not in the inbred mice, MOP-r stimulated binding was twofold higher in controls compared to inbreds, and heroin increased expression of dopamine transporters in inbred mice but not in controls.

=== Adenosingeric and Dopaminergic Signalling ===
In 2011, she published a paper in Neuroscience exploring the interaction between dopamine signalling and adenosine signalling in the ventral tegmental area (VTA). Since adenosine A(2A) receptors have been known to modulate neurotransmitter systems and modulate neural activity in the striatum, she sought to see if this was also true in the VTA. When Al-Hasani knocked out A(2A) receptors and looked the dopamine receptor 2 (D2) mediated inhibition in the VTA, she found that A(2A) knockouts had D2 receptor desensitization leading to reduced maximal inhibition. A follow up was published in Neuropharmacology in 2013 looking at the ability of A(2A) receptors to modulate cholinergic signalling through interactions with nicotinic acetylcholine receptors.

=== Postdoctoral work ===
Al-Hasani moved to America for postdoctoral work, joining the lab of Michael Bruchas in the Department of Anesthesiology at Washington University School of Medicine in St. Louis. Under his mentorship, she explored the kappa opioid system and associated neural circuitry to understand its role in driving motivated behaviors. Al-Hasani wrote a review paper in 2011 discussing the opioid system in the brain and how opioid receptors not only mediate intracellular signal transduction pathways to modulate molecular and cellular responses as well as their role in behaviors associated with analgesia, reward, depression, and anxiety. In 2013, she published a paper in Neuropsychopharmacology examining the interactions between noradrenergic (NA) and dynorphin/kappa opioid systems in the forebrain. She found that the kappa opioid receptor(KOR)-induced reinstatement of cocaine CPP was potentiated when beta-adrenergic signaling was blocked, and that the interactions between adrenergic signalling and KOR signaling occur external to the locus coeruleus. The interaction between the KORs and the NA system had not been previously known, and she established its role in the reinstatement of cocaine drug seeking behavior. Also in 2013, she published a paper exploring the effects of stress on the kappa opioid system in the context of drug relapse. She found that various stressors cause dysregulation of kappa opioid circuitry, but that mild stressors cause adaptive changes in the kappa opioid circuitry that might be protective against drug relapse.

In 2015, her group helped elucidate the mechanisms by which the locus coeruleus noradrenergic (LC-NE) system generates stress-induced anxiety in rodents. They found that activation of the LC-NE neurons increases stress-induced anxiety and aversion and that inhibition attenuates these behaviors. They also found that specifically the corticotropin-releasing hormone positive neurons in the LC that receive inputs from the central amygdala are the neural subpopulation within the LC responsible for mediating the anxiety-like behaviors. Later in 2015, she published a paper in Neuron describing distinct functions of two subregions of the nucleus accumbens (NAc) that are mediated by dynorphin-kappa opioid receptor (KOR) signalling. Specifically, she found that stimulating dynorphinergic cells in the ventral shell of the NAc elicits aversive responses via KOR activation while stimulating dynorphinergic cells in the dorsal shell of the NAc elicits appetitive behaviors mediated by KOR signalling. Her work in the Bruchas Lab led to her winning an NIH Pathway to Independence Award (K99/R00) which provided her the funding to start her own lab.

==== Tool Development ====
Al-Hasani helped create novel technologies in the Bruchas Lab with which to probe neural circuits. She optimized wireless optogenetic technologies that allow for neural circuit modulation without animal movement being constrained by tethering. she also merged wireless optogenetics with pharmacology such that various compounds can be administered to the brain while certain neural circuits are being activated or inhibited to explore the effects of these compounds on neural circuit function and behavioral output. In 2018, she published a method to detect endogenously released peptides from active neural circuits in vivo. She combined in vivo optogenetics with microdialysis to stimulate genetically identified neurons and also detect the peptides that are released that might be mediating neural circuit changes and behavioral outputs.

== Career and research ==
In 2017, Al-Hasani was recruited to stay at Washington University School of Medicine, along with her husband Jordan McCall, as an assistant professor in the Department of Pharmaceutical and Administrative Sciences at the St. Louis College of Pharmacy with an adjunct appointment. Al-Hasani and McCall were the first two researchers to be appointed positions at the new Center for Clinical Pharmacology, formed by a merging of the St. Louis College of Pharmacy and WUSM. Al-Hasani's lab focuses on understanding the neural circuitry involved in addiction, stress, and chronic pain by specifically focusing on the opioid system to elucidate targets for future therapies. By building and using innovative tools for in vivo neural circuit dissection, Al-Hasani and her team study the role of the kappa opioid system in the generation of negative affective states that might accompany chronic pain, withdrawal, and preclude nicotine cessation. In April 2020, Al-Hasani was awarded the Young Investigator Grant from the Brain and Behavior Research Foundation to support her research.

=== Role of Kappa Opioid System in Affective Component of Pain ===
In 2019, Al-Hasani helped dissect physical pain from its emotional affective counterpart in a study published in Neuron. Al-Hasani and her colleagues targeted their investigation to the ventral shell of the nucleus accumbens (NAc), which Al-Hasani had previously shown to be involved in negative affective states. They found that pain recruits the dynorphin-kappa opioid system in the NAc, and that the dynorphinergic cells are more active during inflammatory pain due to a decrease in inhibitory inputs onto these cells. By blocking dynorphinergic kappa opioid receptor signalling in the shell of the NAc, they are able to alleviate the decrease in motivation that results from the experience of pain. These findings show that the kappa opioid system modulates the emotional aspects of the experience of pain and could serve as a less addictive target for pain treatment compared to opiates.

=== Outreach ===
Al-Hasani has helped to mentor the younger generation of scientists and create a space for them to enter the pipeline from a young age. Al-Hasani and McCall recently created a program for undergraduates to explore research opportunities and advance current research at Washington University. They have both hosted undergraduates in their labs and sent them to conferences to present their findings to the broader scientific community.

== Awards and honors ==
- 2020: International Narcotics Research Conference Young Investigator Award
- 2020: Young Investigators Grants from the Brain and Behavior Research Foundation
- "Pathway to Independence Award" from NIDA

== Selected works and publications ==
- Al-Hasani R, Bruchas MR. Molecular mechanisms of opioid receptor-dependent signaling and behavior. Anesthesiology: The Journal of the American Society of Anesthesiologists. 2011 Dec 1;115(6):1363-81. Cited 608 times according to Google Scholar
- McCall JG, Al-Hasani R, Siuda ER, Hong DY, Norris AJ, Ford CP, Bruchas MR. CRH engagement of the locus coeruleus noradrenergic system mediates stress-induced anxiety. Neuron. 2015 Aug 5;87(3):605-20. Cited 200 times according to Google Scholar
- Al-Hasani R, McCall JG, Shin G, Gomez AM, Schmitz GP, Bernardi JM, Pyo CO, Park SI, Marcinkiewcz CM, Crowley NA, Krashes MJ. Distinct subpopulations of nucleus accumbens dynorphin neurons drive aversion and reward. Neuron. 2015 Sep 2;87(5):1063-77. Cited 145 times according to Google Scholar
- Trang T, Al-Hasani R, Salvemini D, Salter MW, Gutstein H, Cahill CM. Pain and poppies: the good, the bad, and the ugly of opioid analgesics. Journal of Neuroscience. 2015 Oct 14;35(41):13879-88. Cited 122 times according to Google Scholar
