= Valintine =

Valintine is a surname. Notable people with the surname include:

- Frances Valintine, New Zealand educator
- Thomas Valintine (1865–1945), New Zealand medical doctor
