= Wendy Pye =

New Zealand publisher

Dame Wendy Pye DNZM MBE
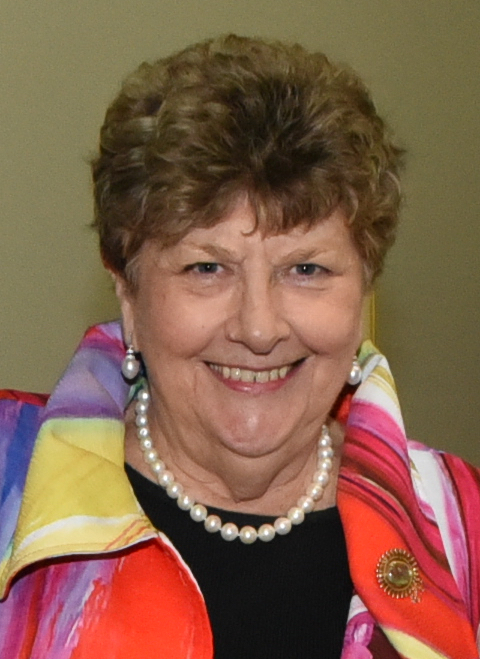
- Pye in 2019
- Born: 1943 (age 82–83); Cookernup, Western Australia
- Occupation: Publisher
- Known for: Educational publishing
- Spouse: Donald Norman Pye

Dame Wendy Edith Pye DNZM MBE (born 1943) is a publisher from New Zealand. Her company, Wendy Pye Group, is considered one of the world's most successful educational export companies.

Pye was born in Cookernup, in rural Western Australia, the youngest of four daughters. After finishing high school, she studied at secretarial school, but left to take a position as a copywriter at a radio station in Perth when she was 17 years old. Four years later she moved to New Zealand and joined the New Zealand News group. She progressed through the company, holding positions managing its magazine and trade publication divisions, and selling its children's books in the United States. In 1985 Brierly Investments bought and restructured the company and she was made redundant at the age of 42.

She decided to move into educational publishing and established Sunshine Books, specialising in early reading and mathematics books, and concentrated on selling in the United States. In 1994 her United States business was bought out and she began to develop new markets in Australia and Asia. By 2010 her firm had eight offices worldwide, and Pye was one of the richest women in New Zealand. The company was one of the first to use digital and CD-Rom technology to develop multi-media educational materials, such as computer-animated numeracy and literacy resources.

== Awards and recognition ==
In 1993, Pye was awarded the New Zealand Suffrage Centennial Medal.

In the 1994 New Year Honours, Pye was appointed a Member of the Order of the British Empire, for services to export.

In 2004, Pye was inducted into the New Zealand Business Hall of Fame: she was the first living woman to be so recognised.

In the 2013 New Year Honours, Pye was appointed a Dame Companion of the New Zealand Order of Merit for services to business and education. In 2014, she won the Business Entrepreneur category at the New Zealand Women of Influence Awards. In 2017, she won the NEXT Woman of the Year award in the Education category.
