= Waitara High School =

Coordinates: 38.9970°S 174.2446°E

Location
- Princess St, Waitara, New Zealand

Information
- Type: State Co-ed Secondary (Year 9–13)
- Motto: Latin: Ulterius Tende (Keep on Striving)
- Established: 1947
- Ministry of Education Institution no.: 170
- Principal: Daryl Warburton
- Enrolment: 440 (July 2026)
- Socio-economic decile: 3G
- Website: waitarahs.school.nz

Waitara High School is a state secondary school in Waitara, Taranaki, New Zealand, founded in 1947.

== History ==
On 1 December 1944, the Taranaki Education Board wrote to the Education Department seeking approval to open a high school. The department in reply asked the board to submit a report on the matter of acquisition of a site, construction of buildings and inauguration of a system of conveyance. On 18 January, eight acres were selected, partly of the Bayly Estate and owned by Mrs O.H. Taylor, as the most suitable site. On 8 June the board forwarded the plans and estimates to the Education Department.

On 28 November 1946 contributing schools were notified that Mr Massey had been appointed headmaster from 1 February 1947 and the school opened on that date with a roll of 120 third, fourth and fifth form pupils in five classrooms, a laboratory, a general purpose room and subsidiary accommodation. A further three classrooms and a library were approved in principle in July 1947 and in December of the same year the board was authorised to call tenders for a new manual building comprising a cookery room and woodwork room with a metalwork bay.

=== The badge ===
The two shades of blue were decided upon by the founding advisory committee. They chose Cambridge blue (light blue) and Oxford blue (dark blue). It was decided that a heraldic style badge was not appropriate for a new school of the era. Instead it was decided to simply use a shield with interlocking letters. The initial WDHS (Waitara District High School) was later replaced with the present WHS. The founding principal, Mr Massey, looked for a motto in Maori which would say – Strive on or Fight on. Mr Rangi Makawe (a member of the committee) was also in favour of this as the school was stood on an old battlefield. Many word combinations were suggested and rejected so finally the words "Whawhai Tonu" were settled on. This was sent to a Maori scholar for his opinion and there concern as the phrase could be interpreted as "Slaughter on". Eventually Mr Massey requested a Latin translation from Victoria University. The university provided a quotation from Virgil containing the words "Ulterius Tende" meaning to "strive on".

=== The bell ===
The school bell was presented to the school from the London County Council in 1946. It is from the Avonmore School at Fulham which was destroyed during the air raids of 1940.

== Principals ==
- 1947 - 1962 EWP Massey
- 1962 - 1970 JF Sharkey
- 1970 - 1973 DF Audley
- 1974 - 1987 RJ Kivell
- 1987 - 1994 Nevill Jessep
- 1995 - 2006 H Cast
- 2006 - 2014 Jenny Gellen
- 2014 – 2016 Graeme Hood
- 2017 – present Daryl Warburton

== Notable alumni ==
- Aaron Bailey-Nowell – basketball player
- Colin Cooper – rugby union player and coach
- Richard Faull – neurologist
- Tony Kemp – rugby league player and coach
- Peter Lucas – rower
- John Major – rugby union player, All Black (1963–67)
- Darcy Nicholas – artist, writer and art administrator.
- Howie Tamati – rugby league player and coach, sports executive, politician

== Sport ==
The school has two sports exchanges annually, one with Forest View High School in Tokoroa and another with Taumarunui High School in Taumarunui.
