= Brain Research =

- Discipline: Neuroscience
- Language: English
- Edited by: Matthew J. LaVoie

Publication details
- History: 1966–present
- Publisher: Elsevier
- Frequency: 60/year
- Open access: no
- Impact factor: 3.252 (2020)

Standard abbreviations
- ISO 4: Brain Res.

Indexing
- Brain Res.
- ISSN: 0006-8993
- OCLC no.: 19645042
- Brain Res. Rev.
- ISSN: 0165-0173

Links
- Journal homepage; Online access; Brain Research Reviews 1979–2011 archive

Brain Research is a peer-reviewed scientific journal focusing on several aspects of neuroscience. It publishes research reports and "minireviews". The editor-in-chief is Matthew J. LaVoie (University of Florida).

Until 2011, full reviews were published in Brain Research Reviews, which is now integrated into the main section, albeit with independent volume numbering. In 2006, four other previously established semi-independent journal sections (Cognitive Brain Research, Developmental Brain Research, Molecular Brain Research, and Brain Research Protocols) were merged with Brain Research.

The journal has nine main subsections:

- Cellular and Molecular Systems
- Nervous System Development, Regeneration and Aging
- Neurophysiology, Neuropharmacology and other forms of Intercellular Communication
- Structural Organization of the Brain
- Sensory and Motor Systems
- Regulatory Systems
- Cognitive and Behavioral Neuroscience
- Disease-Related Neuroscience
- Computational and Theoretical Neuroscience

According to the Journal Citation Reports, the journal's 2020 impact factor is 3.252.

== Abstracting and indexing ==
Brain Research is abstracted and indexed in:

- BIOSIS
- Chemical Abstracts
- Current Contents/Life Sciences
- EMBASE
- Elsevier BIOBASE
- MEDLINE
- PASCAL
- PsycINFO
- Scopus
