= Catherine Mohr =

Mechanical Engineer and Medical Doctor

- Born: 1968 (age 57–58); Dunedin, New Zealand
- Education: Massachusetts Institute of Technology (BS & MS); Stanford University School of Medicine (MD)
- Scientific career
- Fields: telemanipulator robotics; sustainable architecture
- Thesis: The Design of a Compact Actuator System for a Robotic Wrist/Hand (1992)
- Website: https://www.catherinemohr.com/

Catherine Jane Mohr (née Anderson, b. 1968) is a medical researcher from New Zealand, residing in the United States, who specializes in developing telemanipulator robotics for making surgery less invasive, and therefore providing faster recovery for patients. She had also designed fuel cells for land vehicles and high-altitude airplanes and studied sustainable architecture. Mohr is on the faculty of Stanford Medical School and is currently President of the Intuitive Foundation, the corporate foundation of Intuitive Surgical.

== Family ==
Mohr was born Catherine Jane Anderson, in Dunedin, New Zealand. Her mother was a biostatistician and her father was a biochemist. When she was a preschooler her family moved to the United States so her father could pursue postdoctoral research. While her parents always intended to return to New Zealand, they never could find employment in the same place, so Mohr grew up in the US. She did keep her New Zealand citizenship, however.

Mohr's relationship with her spouse, Paul Mohr, started when she broke her pelvis in the year 2000 during a horseback riding incident. Immobilized for six weeks, her friends took care of her and had gatherings at her home, which is how their relationship got off the ground. They have a daughter, Natalie.

== Education ==
An avid tinker and bicycle racer, Mohr worked as a bicycle mechanic near Boston while in high school. When Mohr matriculated at the Massachusetts Institute of Technology, she was planning to study chemistry. Then, during her Sophomore year, joined a friend in founding a solar car racing team. During her first year on the team, of which she remained a member through her Senior year, Mohr realized that tinkering was what she loved and switcher her major to mechanical engineering. While on the solar car racing team, Mohr not only helped race in the US, but also worked on a car for Switzerland's Tour de Sol and in 1987 she raced in Australia's first World Solar Challenge, from Darwin to Adelaide. Her design work on wheels for solar cars, done in collaboration with James D. Worden, was recognized by a second place in the MIT Admiral Luis de Florez award. Also on her team was Megan Smith, who later became the Chief Technology Officer of the United States under President Barack Obama.

After completing her B.S. in mechanical engineering, Mohr continued with graduate school in the same field, also at MIT. Mohr graduated in 1992; her Masters' Thesis was entitled: "The Design of a Compact Actuator System for a Robotic Wrist/Hand." Although she was originally working towards a Ph.D., Mohr decided to leave school and work on electric cars.

In 1999, Mohr began fulfilling premed requirements through UCLA's extension school, and then matriculated at Stanford University School of Medicine. She earned her Doctor of Medicine in 2006, but elected not to move on to a residence program.

== Career ==
From her bike mechanic days in high school, Mohr remained busy.

At MIT she held a number of teaching assistantships and research positions: under Dr. David Gordon Wilson, Mohr helped with a light for a bicycle that was powered by a crank generator; she worked on orthotic knee braces under Dr. Will Durfee; and was a Teaching assistant for undergraduate design courses. She also worked for the Howe Lab at Massachusetts Eye and Ear Infirmary, as an Applications Engineer for Premise, Inc., and from 1989 to 1992 she undertook various consulting jobs for Anderson Consulting.

When Mohr left school to work on electric cars, she became Rod Millen's program manager in California. She quickly moved on to be a mechanical engineer at AeroVironment, in Monrovia, California, working under Dr. Paul MacCready on fuel cells and hybrid batteries for land vehicles as well as high-altitude aircraft. She founded a laboratory focusing on creating fuel cell systems for aircraft designed to stay aloft for months at a time.

After about five years of this work, Mohr reconsidered how she wanted to move forward. She once told the New York Times that her interest in engineering is "about improving the human condition, and also, not incidentally, making the science better for when we and our loved ones need it." So, although she was doing research in partnerships with the major US car companies, the fact that in the mid-1990s there was no sign of hybrid or electric cars would be sold to consumers became an issue for her. As she contemplated her career path, she observed the testing of experimental medical devices during surgeries at Massachusetts General Hospital. When the technology did not work, Mohr started contemplating the engineering challenges of designing technology without a deep knowledge of the working of the human body. Eventually, Mohr decided to attend medical school.

Mohr once noted that during her five years of med school, taking an extra year for conducting research, the idea of applying robotics to surgery really started to take hold in the medical community. From investigating minimally invasive surgical tools to assisting on laparoscopic surgeries, as well as working as a teaching assistant, Mohr delved into interdisciplinary studies. With Dr. Myriam Curet, she co-developed a laparoscopic Roux-enY gastric bypass. It became part of the da Vinci Surgical System, developed by Intuitive Surgical, where she would later spend much of her career.

While in medical school, Mohr also founded medical device start-up Veresure to market the LapCap, a tool she invented that made laparoscopic surgery safer. During laparoscopic surgery, it is necessary to lift the abdominal wall away from the abdominal cavity, or else surgeons risk harming the intestines or a large blood vessel. At the time, the common way to lift the area was to use towel clips on either side of the navel. Mohr invented a bell-shaped device that creates a vacuum, thereby lifting the abdominal wall and creating an air pocket in the abdomen. She sold it to Aragon Surgical in 2006.

Since 2006, Mohr has also been an associate professor at the Stanford Medical School and studying methods for using simulations in surgical medical training. Additionally, she has been on the medical faculty at Singularity University, located at Moffet Field, since 2009.

By 2001, her spouse was already working for Intuitive Surgical, developer of the da Vinci surgical robot. Since she was interested in the potential for robotics lessening the force exerted on the body during surgery, she suggested some of her mentors at med school try the da Vinci. She began consulting for Intuitive, and eventually went to work for them full time.

Over several years she was Director of Medical Research, and then Senior Director and Vice President of the same department. Initially she continued work on techniques for minimizing pressure on the body during surgery. Over time, she looked at applications for new surgical technologies, including focal therapy for destroying tumors and infrared vision markers. She then spent about three years as Intuitive Surgical's Vice President of Strategy, before creating their Intuitive Foundation in 2018.

She also advises startups in the U.K., the U.S., and New Zealand.

Mohr is a member of Sigma Xi and the Institute for the Advancement of Engineering.

=== Patents ===
Mohr is listed as the inventor on approximately forty patents for medical devices.

=== Awards and honors ===
- USA Science and Engineering Festival One of the “Nifty Fifty” noted science mentors (2012)
- “Flying Kiwi” New Zealand Hi-Tech Hall of Fame (2014) - First woman to be inducted.
- World Class New Zealander (2014)
- Hood Fellowship, The Lion Foundation (2014)
- NEXT Woman of the year, Health and Sciences Category (2015)
- Silicon Valley Business Journal Women of Influence (2020) - recognized for work to get personal protective equipment for medical personnel in the early months of the COVID-19 pandemic.

== Hobbies and professional sidelines ==
Mohr was an avid motorcyclist before she drove automobiles regularly.

Mohr scuba dives and enjoys traveling and cooking. During medical school she invented a chocolate coin stamping machine, although it never went anywhere. In 2011, Mohr began playing cello; she told the Mercury News a few years later that she did so because "one should always be a beginner at something."

In addition to her main career path, she got very interested in green architecture and developed a certain level of expertise in the area.

She has given TED Talks on robotic surgery, green architecture, and a diving accident involving a sea urchin that just predated her horseback riding accident in which she broke her pelvis.
