= Aaron Bailey-Nowell =

New Zealand basketball player (born 1981)

Personal information
- Born: 10 July 1981 (age 45)
- Listed height: 196 cm (6 ft 5 in)
- Listed weight: 105 kg (231 lb)

Career information
- High school: Waitara (Waitara, New Zealand)
- Playing career: 2002–2022
- Position: Forward

Career history
- 2002–2003: Wellington Saints
- 2004–2005: Taranaki Mountainairs
- 2006–2007: Manawatu Jets
- 2008–2017; 2019: Taranaki Mountainairs
- 2020: Auckland Huskies
- 2021–2022: Taranaki Mountainairs/Airs

Career highlights
- NBL champion (2003); FIBA Oceania Pacific Championship MVP (2013)
Medals
Men's basketball
Representing New Zealand
FIBA Oceania Pacific Championship
Gold medal – first place	2013 Porirua	Team competition

Aaron Bailey-Nowell (born 10 July 1981) is a New Zealand former basketball player. He debuted in the National Basketball League (NBL) in 2002 with the Wellington Saints and won a championship with them the following year. He played for the Taranaki Airs for the first time in 2004, his first of four stints. He played two seasons for the Manawatu Jets from 2006 and a season with the Auckland Huskies in 2020. In 2013, he helped the NZ Maori team win the FIBA Oceania Pacific Championship while earning the tournament's most valuable player award. He represented New Zealand at FIBA 3x3 tournaments in 2017, 2018 and 2019.

== Early life ==
Bailey-Nowell attended Waitara High School in Waitara, New Zealand, and played junior basketball at Taranaki Basketball Association.

== NBL career ==
Bailey-Nowell debuted in the National Basketball League (NBL) in 2002 with the Wellington Saints and won a championship with the Saints in 2003. He joined the Taranaki Mountainairs in 2004 and continued on with them in 2005. He moved to the Manawatu Jets for the 2006 season and played a second season in 2007.

After spending the 2007–08 Australian NBL season as a training player with the West Sydney Razorbacks, Bailey-Nowell returned to Taranaki in 2008 and played for the Mountainairs every year until 2017. After missing the 2018 season, he re-joined the Mountainairs in 2019.

Bailey-Nowell was set to play for the Mountainairs in 2020 prior to COVID-19. In July 2020, he joined the Auckland Huskies for the rest of the 2020 NBL Showdown as an injury replacement for Taine Murray.

Bailey-Nowell re-joined Taranaki for the 2021 season. In May 2021, he played his 300th NBL game. He re-joined Taranaki, now known as the Airs, for the 2022 season. He retired from the NBL in August 2022.

== National team career ==
In 2006, Bailey-Nowell had a Tall Blacks trial.

In 2013, Bailey-Nowell played for the NZ Maori team in the FIBA Oceania Pacific Championship in Porirua. His two-pointer on the buzzer in the semi-final lifted the team to a 77–75 win over Guam. He finished the match with 25 points and 16 rebounds. In the final, he had 12 points and nine rebounds as the team beat Australia 71–66 to win the tournament. He was subsequently named MVP of the tournament.

In June 2017, Bailey-Nowell travelled to France with the New Zealand 3x3 National Team to compete in the FIBA 3x3 World Cup. He played for the New Zealand 3x3 National Team at the FIBA Asia 3x3 Cup and FIBA 3x3 World Cup in 2018. He competed at the FIBA 3x3 Asia Cup again in 2019.

== Personal life ==
Bailey-Nowell and his wife Melissa have two children.

As of 2021, Bailey-Nowell is a teacher-aid and basketball coach at Waitara High School.
