= Victoria Ransom =

New Zealand entrepreneur

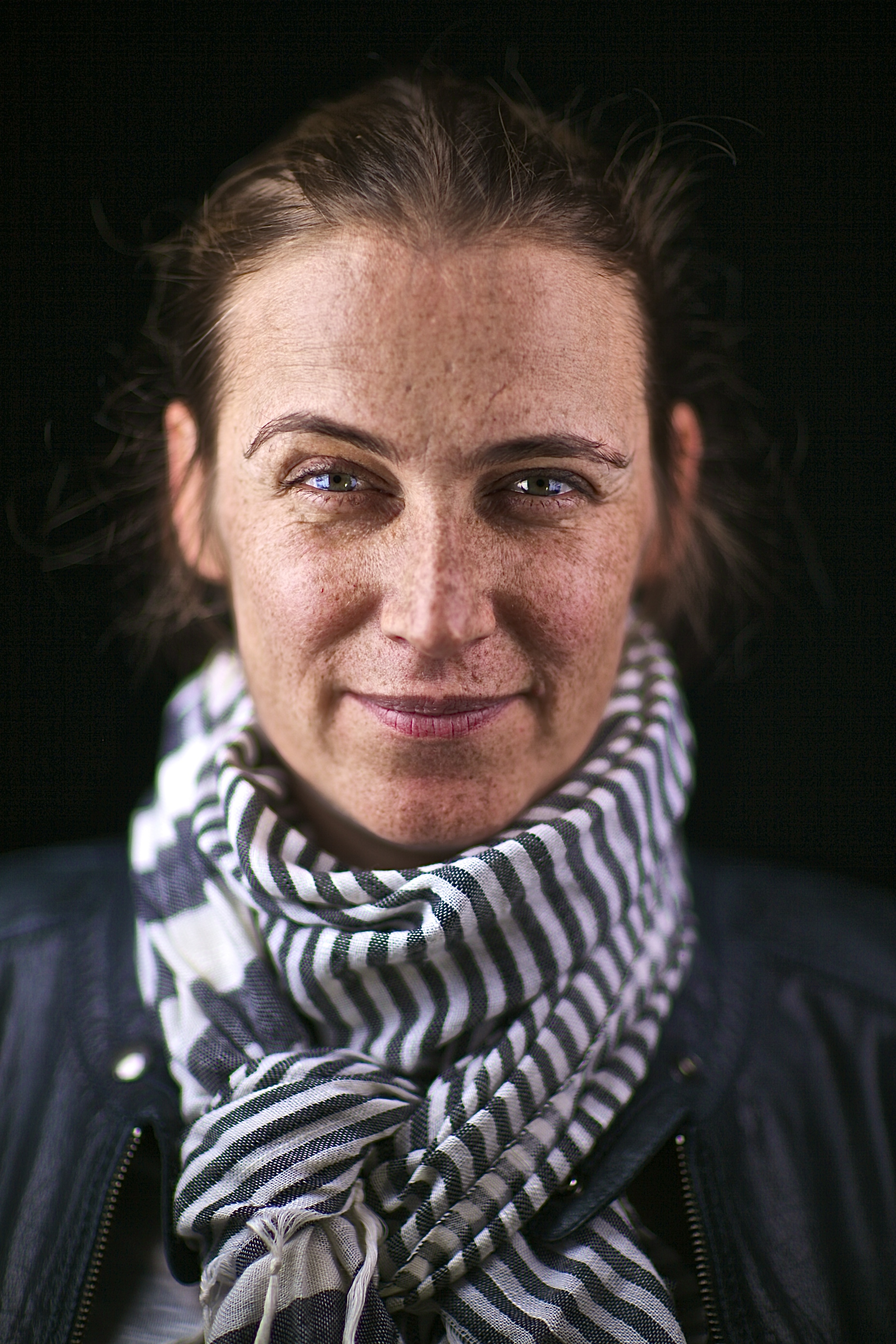
- Education: Bachelor of Arts, Master of Business Administration
- Alma mater: United World College, Macalester College, Harvard Business School
- Occupation: Entrepreneur
- Known for: Co-founder and CEO of Wildfire Interactive
- Partner: Alain Chuard

Victoria Ransom is a serial entrepreneur from New Zealand. She has developed three companies including Wildfire Interactive, a social marketing SaaS company, where Ransom was chief executive officer until it was sold to Google in 2012. Ransom currently resides in Palo Alto.

Ransom was listed as one of Fortune's Most Powerful Women Entrepreneurs as well as one of their 40 under 40 in 2012. In 2015, she was named a Young Global Leader by the World Economic Forum.

== Education ==
Ransom was raised on an asparagus farm in Scotts Ferry, near Bulls, New Zealand. In her final year at Whanganui Girls' College, she won a scholarship to attend international high school United World College in New Mexico. She then attended Macalester College, where she earned her BA in psychology and graduated summa cum laude in 1999. Ransom received her MBA from Harvard Business School in 2008.

== Career ==
After graduating from Macalester, Ransom moved to London where she worked as a business consultant. Later, she moved to New York City and worked for investment banking firm Morgan Stanley. She left the company in 2001 and founded Access Trips, an adventure travel company in New Zealand. Ransom co-ran Access Trips for five years before returning to the US to attend business school. While at Harvard Business School, Ransom co-developed a distributed booking system for small and medium size travel companies, resulting in a summer at Highland Capital Partners as an Entrepreneur in Residence.

In 2008, Ransom founded Wildfire Interactive, a social marketing software company initially developed to help promote Access Trips. Ransom ran Wildfire as chief executive officer and grew the company to 400 employees in four years. In 2010, she sold Access Trips. In 2012, Google bought Wildfire for a reported $450 million and Ransom became the Director of Product at Google.

She was named Ernst & Young Entrepreneur of the Year Award for New Zealand in 2011. In 2013, she was invited to the White House by Barack Obama to receive a "Champion of Change" award recognizing her contributions as an immigrant entrepreneur. In 2015, she was awarded the World Class New Zealander award along with former New Zealand Prime Minister, Helen Clark. In 2016, she was NEXT Woman of the Year in the Business and Innovation category.

In 2020, Ransom co-founded Prisma, a remote education startup.

== Personal life ==
In college she met Alain Chuard, also a Macalester student and Ransom's future business partner. The two married in March 2013 and had a daughter in 2014.
