= Mai Chen =

New Zealand constitutional lawyer

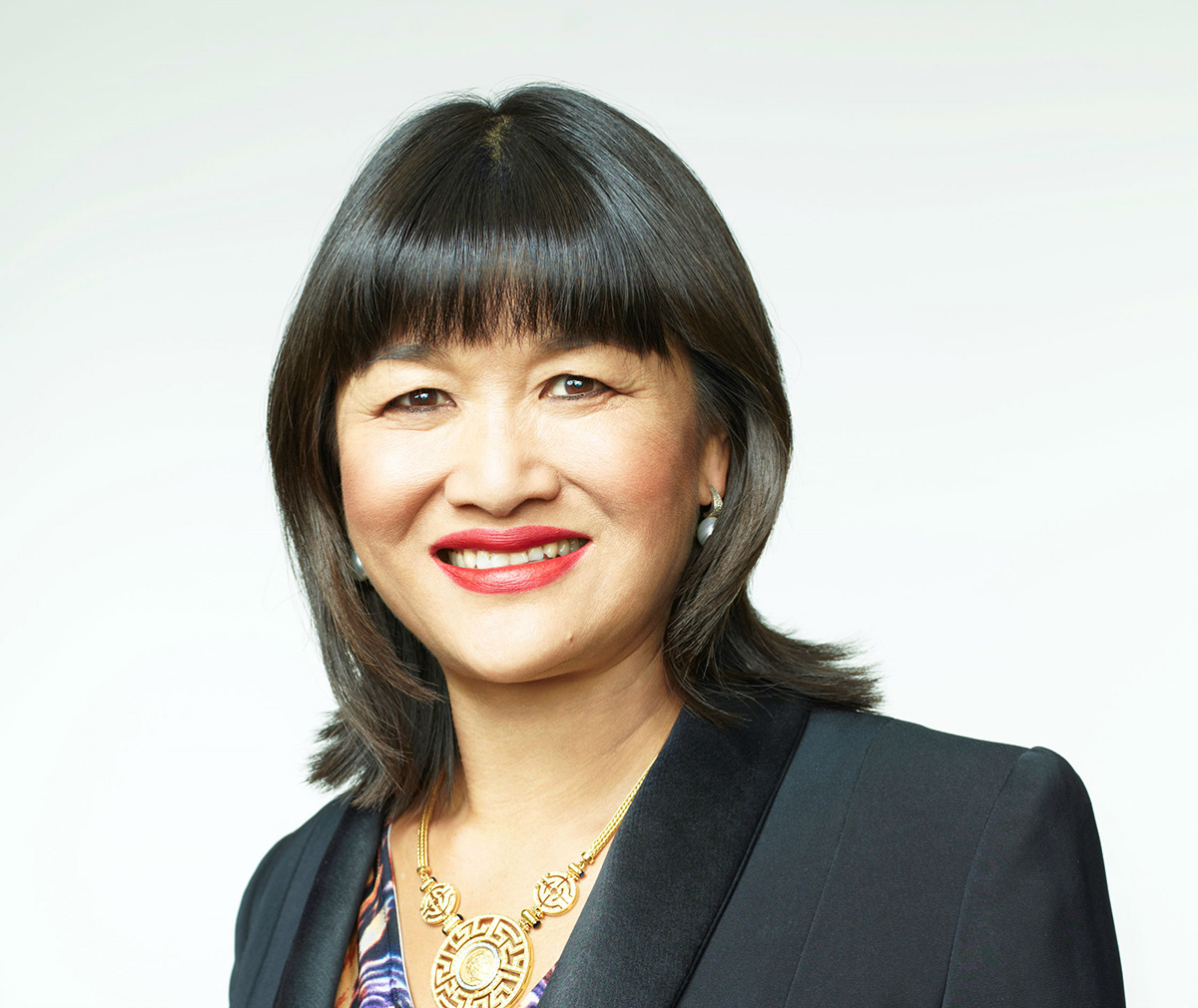
- Mai Chen in 2023

Personal details
- Born: Taipei, Taiwan
- Spouse: Dr John Sinclair
- Children: 1
- Occupation: Lawyer, Managing Law Partner and Non-Executive Director.

Mai Chen is a New Zealand lawyer with a professional and specialist focus in constitutional and administrative law, Waitangi Tribunal and courts, human rights, white collar fraud and regulatory defence, judicial review, regulatory issues, education law, and public policy and law reform. She was educated at Otago University and Harvard University. She is an adjunct professor at the University of Auckland School of Law.

Chen has featured in Forbes magazine, TEDx talks and the National Business Review (NBR) and was a finalist for the New Zealander of the year award.

== Early life ==
Born in Taipei, Taiwan, Chen immigrated to New Zealand with her family at the age of six in 1970, and did not speak English. The family immigrated so her father, an Olympic gymnastics coach, could train the national team. She attended Otago Girls' High School, where she became a head girl and dux.

== Education ==
Chen attended the University of Otago (New Zealand) and graduated with a Bachelor of Laws Honours degree (first class) in 1986. She graduated with a Master of Laws from Harvard Law School in 1988 and won a prize for the best Human Rights thesis. Otago University awarded Chen an Honorary Doctor of Laws degree in December 2023 and she delivered the graduation address.

== Career ==
Chen interned at the United Nations' International Labour Office in Geneva in 1988. In 1989, she returned to New Zealand to become a lecturer at the law school at Victoria University of Wellington. That year she wrote her first book on the discrimination against women under the UN Convention on the Elimination of Discrimination against Women.

In 1993, she co-authored Public Law in New Zealand with former Prime Minister Sir Geoffrey Palmer, which was published by Oxford University Press. In 1994, Chen became a lawyer at Russell McVeagh.

In 1995, Chen co-found specialist public law firm Chen Palmer alongside former Palmer. Chen bought out Palmer when he left to head the Law Commission in 2006. Chen Palmer won best boutique law firm in 2010, and best public law firm in the New Zealand Law Awards from 2007 to 2011, and 2013. In 2022, Chen left her role as senior partner of Chen Palmer to go to the Bar.

In 2015, Chen became an adjunct professor at the Faculty of Law at the University of Auckland.

== Voluntary work ==
Chen is founder and chair of the Superdiversity Institute, and was the founder and previous chair of New Zealand Asian Leaders, that connects Asian NZ lawyers, CEOs and emerging leaders with New Zealand companies doing business in Asia. She helped to establish the Pacifica Leadership Academy at BEST Pacific Institute of Education, formerly led by Beatrice Faumuina. Chen is also the founder and President of New Zealand Asian Lawyers. Chen is the inaugural chair of Global Women, which is a not for profit charitable organisation for top women leaders in the public, private and not for profit sectors which mentors emerging leaders.

Chen, as part of her pro-bono work, organises and hosts a number of seminars and events across Auckland to bring together the New Zealand's top legal specialists. Chen has done a wide range of pro bono work, including for the Auckland Zoo, New Zealand Endometriosis Foundation and He Huarahi Tamariki (the school for Teenage Parents in Tawa). Chen has also provided pro bono advice to the Bilingual Leo Pacific Coalition.

Chen was President of the Harvard Law School Alumni Association (New Zealand) for ten years, and was a trustee of the Royal New Zealand Ballet Board for four and a half years.

From 1982 to 1986 Chen did voluntary work with street kids referred by the Department of Social Welfare, including the establishment of a Modern Dance Group for girls.

Chen has previously sat on the Yvonne Smith Scholarship Committee which awards scholarships to women, including those who want to study post-graduate law. She also was a member of the selection panel for the New Zealander of the Year award in 2019.

In 2024, Chen established the Mai Chen Legal Innovation Award, to be granted annually to the Otago University law student who produces the most innovative piece of legal writing.

== Honours and prizes ==
2022	NZL Most Influential Lawyer 2022
2017	Zonta Woman of the Biennium Award for 2016-2018
2016	Global Diversity List Top 50 Diversity Figures in Public Life
2013	Awarded the Business Entrepreneur New Zealand Women of Influence Award
2012	Awarded the Supreme Judges Panel Award and Professional Excellence Award at the New Zealand Chinese Business Elite Awards
2011	Awarded Next Magazine's Business Woman of the Year
2000	Fellow of the New Zealand Institute of Management
1988	Irving Oberman Memorial Award: Best Human Rights thesis at Harvard Law School. Topic: Treaty of Waitangi and Māori rights

== Books and publications ==
- Culturally, ethnically and linguistically diverse parties in the Courts: a Chinese case study, Superdiversity Institute of Law, Policy and Business, 2019.
- National Culture and its Impact on Workplace Health and Safety and Injury Prevention for Employers and Workers, Superdiversity Institute of Law, Policy and Business, 2019.
- Health and safety regulators in a superdiverse context: Review of challenges and lessons from United Kingdom, Canada and Australia, Superdiversity Institute of Law, Policy and Business, 2018.
- Diverse Thinking Capability Audit of New Zealand Boardrooms 2018, Superdiversity Institute of Law, Policy and Business, 2018.
- Superdiversity Stocktake: Implications for Business, Government and New Zealand, Superdiversity Institute for Law, Policy and Business, 2015.
- Superdiversity, Democracy & New Zealand’s Electoral & Referenda Laws, Superdiversity Institute for Law, Policy and Business, 2015.
- Public Law Toolbox (2 edition) Lexis Nexis, December 2014.
- Transforming Auckland: The Creation of Auckland Council LexisNexis, April 2013.
- Public Law Toolbox LexisNexis, March 2012.
- Women and Discrimination: New Zealand and the UN Convention (Institute of Policy Studies, Wellington, 1989).

== Major articles and papers ==
- Susan Glazebrook J & Mai Chen “Tikanga and Culture in the Supreme Court: Ellis and Deng” Amicus Curiae Journal Vol 4, No. 2 (2023): Series 2, published on 6 March 2023.
- David Goddard J & Mai Chen “Article: Putting a Social and Cultural Framework on the Evidence Act” Amicus Curiae Journal Vol. 4 No. 1 (2022): Series 2, published on 2 November 2022.
- “The Supreme Court, Confucianism and Western values and the impact on the law”, LawTalk, Issue 946, June 2021.
- “Lawyers need to do more to ensure CALD clients get equal access to justice in courts”, LawTalk, Issue 935, December 2020.
- “CALD parties before the Employment Relations Authority”, LawTalk, Issue 939, May 2020.
- “Judicial leadership on equal access to justice for Culturally and Linguistically Diverse Parties in Courts”, LawTalk, Issue 938, April 2020.
- “Unique issues and challenges faced by culturally, ethnically and linguistically diverse parties in court” [2019] New Zealand Law Journal 393.
- “Ensuring ethnically diverse workers do not suffer greater injury and illness”, LawTalk, Issue 925, February 2019.
- “The Importance of Diverse Thinking for the Legal Profession”, LawTalk, Issue 922, October 2018.
- “Multiple Ground Discrimination: A 21st century necessity” LawTalk, Issue 902, 2 December 2016.
