= Julie Chapman =

Founder and CEO of charity KidsCan

Dame Julie Chapman DNZM
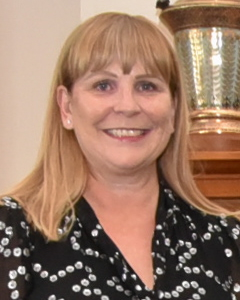
- Chapman in 2020
- Born: 1971 or 1972 (age 53–54)
- Awards: NEXT Woman of the Year supreme award (2013)

Dame Julie Clare Chapman DNZM (née Helson; born 1971 or 1972) is a New Zealand charity founder. She founded the KidsCan Charitable Trust in 2005, and Pet Refuge New Zealand in 2017. In December 2024, she was appointed a Dame Companion of the New Zealand Order of Merit, for services to children and the community.

== Life ==
Born in 1971 or 1972 into a middle-class family, Chapman grew up on Auckland's North Shore and in Henderson. Her father, Kenneth Helson, was the manager of a demolition company, and her mother was active in a local church. Chapman initially planned to become a police officer, but worked for an office supply company, moving into marketing. After experiencing a violent relationship, Chapman began working for the charity Victim Support. Chapman has worked with other charities including Women's Refuge, The First Tee, Victim Support and Westpac Rescue Helicopter. She also worked as the marketing officer for Child Flight Air Ambulance.

Chapman was inspired to found KidsCan after learning of children staying away from school because they didn't have raincoats. Initially, when she heard of the problem she thought there might be a few hundred children impacted nationally, but in a rough survey of 80 low-decile schools she found that there were thousands of children impacted. In 2005, she founded the KidsCan Charitable Trust, which provides physical and nutritional support to New Zealand children living in poverty. Chapman began running the charity out of her garage, with a grant of $40,000. By 2022, the charity had grown to an annual revenue of more than $20 million.

Chapman is the founder and a trustee of Pet Refuge New Zealand, a charity that provides temporary shelter for family pets affected by domestic violence at its purpose-built shelter, until they can be reunited with their owners. Chapman said "I absolutely love animals, so knowing they are often used as a tool to control family members, as part of that [domestic] violence – I just really hate that."

In 2024, KidsCan announced that it had record levels of need, with 10,000 children needing help.

== Honours and awards ==
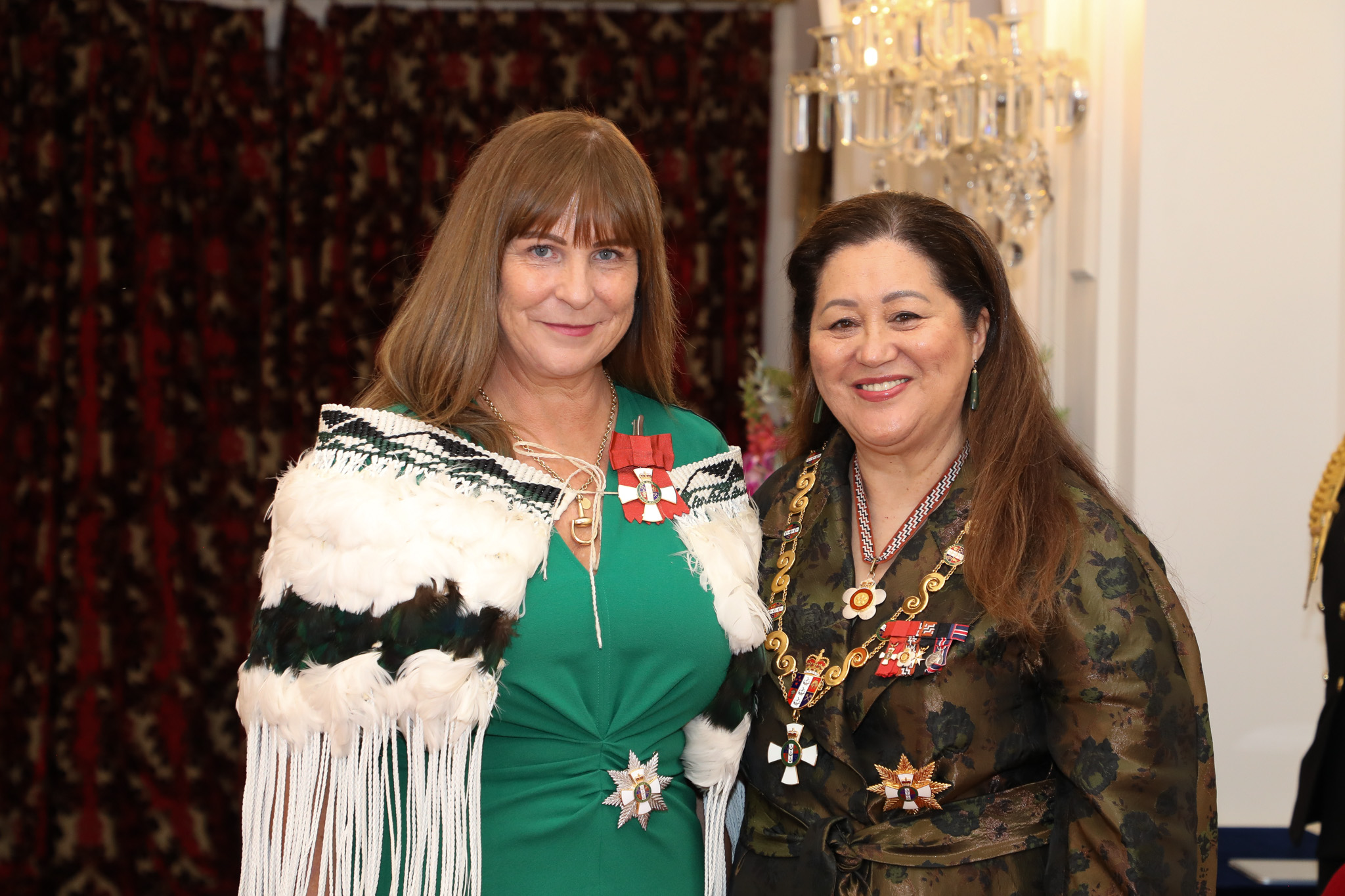
Chapman (left), after her investiture as a Dame Companion of the New Zealand Order of Merit by the governor-general, Dame Cindy Kiro, at Government House, Wellington, on 16 September 2025

In 2008, Chapman was awarded a Sir Peter Blake Leadership Award. In 2013, she was the supreme winner of the NEXT Woman of the Year Awards. In 2015, Chapman was a finalist for New Zealander of the Year.

In the 2025 New Year Honours, Chapman was appointed a Dame Companion of the New Zealand Order of Merit, for services to children and the community. On receiving the honour, Chapman said that "It brought up mixed emotions … I feel really proud to receive this honour, but I'm acutely aware that it's for work that shouldn't need to be done."

Chapman is a finalist for the 2026 New Zealander of the Year awards.
