= Hip Hop-eration =

New Zealand documentary film

- Film poster
- Directed by: Bryn Evans
- Written by: Bryn Evans
- Produced by: Alex Lee; Paula Jones
- Starring: Billie Jordan; Maynie Thompson; Kara Nelson
- Cinematography: Bevan Crothers
- Edited by: Pieter Roberts
- Music by: Tom Fox; Marshall Smith; The Sound Room
- Production company: New Zealand Film Commission
- Distributed by: Rialto cinemas
- Release date: September 2014
- Running time: 93 minutes
- Country: New Zealand
- Language: English
- Budget: 350,000 NZ

Hip Hop-eration is a New Zealand documentary film about a dance troupe managed by communications consultant turned flash mob choreographer Billie Jordan on Waiheke Island in New Zealand. The dance troupe (called Hip Op-eration), with an average age of nearly 80 among its members, decided to apply for the special exhibition category in the Las Vegas Hip Hop International championships of August 2013. The documentary documents their journey through time, space and doctor's visits. It opened theatrically in Auckland on 22 September 2014.

== Cast ==
- Kara "Bang Bang" Nelson (94, with cane)
- Maynie "Quicksilver" Thompson (95)
- Terri "2-cents" Wool-Moore Goodwin (94)
- Eileen "Diva mystic" Evans (84)
- Rosemary "Missy Ro-Yo" McKenzie (74)
- Billie "Billie J Buzz" Jordan (44)

== Reviews ==
The film was as well received as their act itself, and the movie included some appreciative footage of goodwill from young New Zealand Hip Hop talents Dziah and Krash, two Hip Hop dance troupes that also competed in Las Vegas in 2013. The film went on to receive best documentary, best director and best cinematographer awards at the New Zealand Film Awards in December and after international release won the Audience Choice Award at the Santa Barbara International Film Festival.
