= Jill Marshall =

British writer

Jill Marshall is a British writer. She emigrated to New Zealand in 2003 but returned to England in December 2012. Her works include the Jane Blonde and Doghead series of children's novels, as well as several novels for women termed 'chick lit'.

== Biography ==
Jill Marshall received a Masters' in History from Cambridge in 1987. She worked in commerce and in HR for a large telecoms company for 14 years. She then quit her job to pursue a Masters' in Writing for Children at Winchester University, which she received in 2002.

Jill Marshall migrated from the United Kingdom to New Zealand in 2003, where she ran a manuscript assessment service called Write Good Stuff.

In 2011, Marshall published and promoted the picture book Curly from Shirley: The Christchurch Dog from which a percentage of the profits were to go to New Zealand Red Cross charity in the wake of the 2011 Christchurch earthquake, which also led to the formation of her publishing company Pear Jam Books. Following these efforts she was named by New Zealand's Next Magazine as its Woman of the Year 2011 in arts and culture for her contribution to the local literary scene. Jill later went on to publish works by seven local authors under her publishing company Pear Jam Books before launching an on-line training programme which included the signed up authors having their selected work in progress published and marketed with Pear Jam Books.

Marshall left New Zealand and returned to the United Kingdom in December 2012, later closing Pear Jam Books and leaving multiple publishing contracts with local authors in limbo. After rights to their work was reverted, many authors went on to sign publishing contracts with mainstream publishers, or successfully self-published.

She has one daughter, Katie.

== Bibliography ==
=== Children's books ===
==== Jane Blonde ====
- Jane Blonde: Sensational Spylet 2006
- Jane Blonde: Spies Trouble 2006
- Jane Blonde: Twice the Spylet (2007)
- Jane Blonde: Spylet on Ice (2007)
- Jane Blonde: Goldenspy (2008)
- Jane Blonde: Spy in the Sky (2008)
- Jane Blonde: The Perfect Spylet (2008)
- Jane Blonde: Spylets are Forever (2009)

==== Doghead ====
- Doghead (2009) – also published as Jack BC and the Curse of Anubis
- Doghead Bites Back (2010)

==== Other ====
- Kave-Tina Rox (2009) – picture book
- Matilda Peppercorn: Switch (2013) – also published as Matilda Peppercorn: Manx

=== Novels for adults ===
- The Two Miss Parsons (2008)
- As It Is On Telly (2009)
- The Most Beautiful Man in the World (2010)
- Fanmail (2015)
- Pineapple (2015)
