= Sally Merry =

New Zealand child psychiatry academic

- Born: Sally Nicola Merry
- Scientific career
- Fields: Child psychiatry
- Institutions: University of Auckland
- Thesis: Population-based approaches to reducing depression in adolescents in New Zealand (2006)

Sally Nicola Merry is a New Zealand child psychiatry academic. She is currently a full professor at the University of Auckland and holds the Cure Kids Duke Family Chair in Child and Adolescent Mental Health.

Merry obtained her PhD from the University of Auckland. The title of her 2006 doctoral thesis was Population-based approaches to reducing depression in adolescents in New Zealand.

Merry rose to full professor in 2015, and has been involved in the development and evaluation of the SPARX video game for young persons with mild to moderate depression, stress or anxiety. In 2014, Merry was named as the NEXT Woman of the Year in the Health & Science category.

== Selected works ==
- Merry, Sally N., Karolina Stasiak, Matthew Shepherd, Chris Frampton, Theresa Fleming, and Mathijs FG Lucassen. "The effectiveness of SPARX, a computerised self help intervention for adolescents seeking help for depression: randomised controlled non-inferiority trial." BMJ 344 (2012): e2598.
- Merry, Sally, H. McDowell, Sarah Hetrick, J. Bir, and N. Muller. "Psychological and/or educational interventions for the prevention of depression in children and adolescents." Cochrane Database Syst Rev 1, no. 1 (2004).
- Cochrane Review: Psychological and educational interventions for preventing depression in children and adolescents
- Merry, Sally, Heather McDowell, Chris J. Wild, Julliet Bir, and Rachel Cunliffe. "A randomized placebo-controlled trial of a school-based depression prevention program." Journal of the American Academy of Child & Adolescent Psychiatry 43, no. 5 (2004): 538–547.
- Hetrick, S., S. Merry, J. McKenzie, P. Sindahl, and M. Proctor. "Selective serotonin reuptake inhibitors (SSRIs) for depressive disorders in children and adolescents." Cochrane Database Syst Rev 3 (2007).
- Merry, Sally N., and Leah K. Andrews. "Psychiatric status of sexually abused children 12 months after disclosure of abuse." Journal of the American Academy of Child & Adolescent Psychiatry 33, no. 7 (1994): 939–944.
