= Jane Blonde =

Series of young adult novels

Jane Blonde is the eponymous heroine of the Jane Blonde series of young adult novels by Jill Marshall. Jane Blonde is a James Bondesque spy, who is sent on missions and equipped with (often disguised) gadgets. Reviewers have praised Marshall's action sequences and pacing, but several have also expressed confusion stemming from the number of characters, a number of whom assume multiple names, and some of the plot twists.

Jane Blonde has been identified as both a parody of the James Bond books/films and a girl power instance of the spy adventure genre epitomized by the James Bond franchise (rather than a parody proper).

On May 11, 2010, Jill Marshall announced that Sensational Spylet, the first book in the series, had been optioned by Bridge to Terabithia co-producer Tim Coddington.

== Plot ==
Janey Brown was originally a normal and boring student. Then one day, G-Mamma appeared at her school and told her that her mother was being held hostage on the roof of her uncle's bank. Janey Brown's life was turned upside down, and she now has two identities: Jane Blonde the spylet and Janey Brown the normal school girl.

Jane Blonde, a spylet for Solomon's Polificational Investigations, might fight the evil Sinerlesse Group. G-Mamma, her SPI:KE (SPI: Kid Educator), helps her with advice and by providing gadgets, the most important of which is the Wower, a shower-like transformation machine. Jane meets multiple other spylets, some of whom help her, some of whom betray her. She also finds out that there is no such person as Solomon Brown. He is actually her father, who she has never before seen in her life. It is found out that her best friend Ariel (who she knows as Freddie,) is the leader of the Sinerlesse Group. It is her teacher who writes those bad notes.

== Characters ==
- Janey Brown (code named Jane Blonde) - The eponymous spylet working for SPI and the main character of the series. Janey is initially introduced as a socially awkward and bullied adolescent, though she gains confidence with her new powers as a spylet and the friendship of Alfie.
- Rosie Biggenham ("G-Mamma") – Jane's SPI:KE (SPI: Kid Educator) and godmother (though, due to her false memories of her past, Jean doesn't remember Rosie, creating problems early in the series), G-Mamma serves as Jane's trainer and handler.
- Jean Brown (née Geneva Delacroix, codenamed Gina Bellarina) - Janey Brown's mother and a former spy.
- Bowood "Boz Brilliance" Brown (Boz professionally uses the identity of his brother Solomon Brown, as well as Abe Rownigan) – Janey Brown's father, step-father (as Abe Rownigan), and the founder of SPI. Boz is largely shrouded in mystery throughout the series, leading to several misunderstandings, though he communicates with his daughter during his absence through coded messages disguised as puzzles.
- Alfie Halliday (code named Al Halo) – best friend of Janey Brown, son of headmistress (Maisie Halliday) class superstar, fellow spylet.
- Maisie Halliday aka Halo – Mother of Al Halo and Spi
- Copernicus (revealed to be Al Halo's father) – sworn enemy (and brother as of Spylets are Forever) of Bowood Brown.
- The Sinnerlesse Group – a spy group, originally a group of field scientists of SPI, the primary antagonists in the first book.
- Solomon's Polificational Investigations (SPI) – a group of government approved spies.
- Trouble – Boz and Janey's spy cat.
- Titian Ambition aka Tish – another member of SPI.
- Magenta – SPI:KE of Titian Ambition.
- Leaf – a spylet, once a spy for Copernicus.
- Blackbird – a spylet, once a spy for Copernicus.
- Rook – twin of Blackbird, loyal to Boz.
- Uncle James aka Jakobi Delacroix aka James Bond - brother of Jean Brown, uncle of Janey Brown, friend of Solomon Brown. James initially appears to be a somewhat dull and humourless banker in the first book. He is introduced with two daughters, of whom he shares custody with his ex-wife.
- Chloe - Janey's identical twin, a non-spy (clone)
- Bert-Newbie spy in Australia (spi name:Dubbo Seven)
- Maddy-Bert's spy sheep

== Books ==
- Jane Blonde: Sensational Spylet (2006)
- Jane Blonde: Spies Trouble (2006)
- Jane Blonde: Twice the Spylet (2007)
- Jane Blonde: Spylet on Ice (2007)
- Jane Blonde: Goldenspy (2008)
- Jane Blonde: Spy in the Sky (2008)
- Jane Blonde: The Perfect Spylet (2008)(world book day special)
- Jane Blonde: Spylets are Forever (2009)
