= Ranjna Patel =

Founder of Gandhi Nivas family violence prevention programme

Dame Ranjna Patel DNZM QSM JP
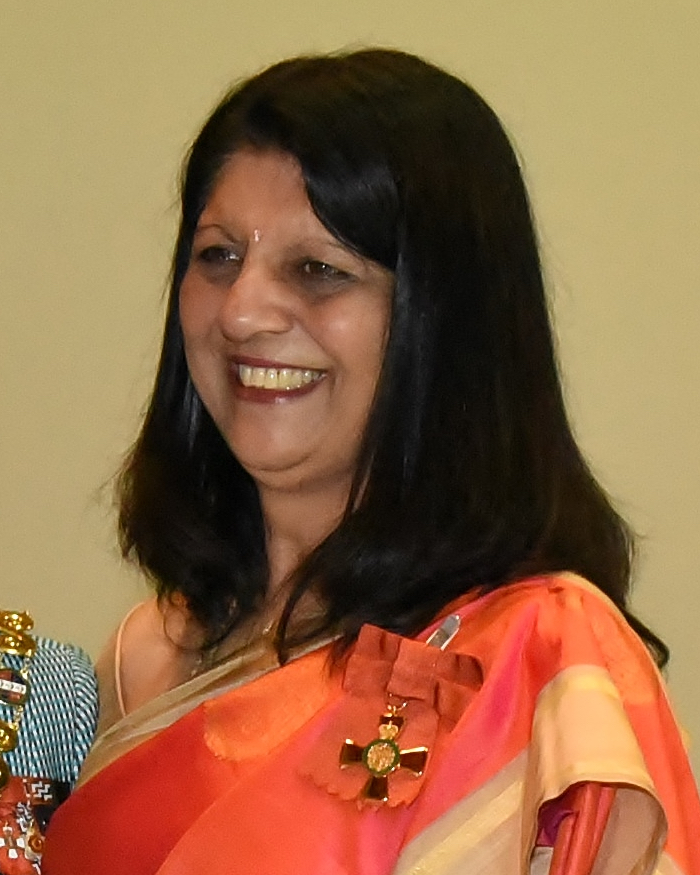
- Patel in 2017
- Known for: Founding Gandhi Nivas family violence prevention service

Dame Ranjna Patel is the founder of the Gandhi Nivas family violence prevention programme in New Zealand.

== Work ==
Patel founded the Gandhi Nivas family violence prevention programme in 2014. The programme partners with Counties Manukau Police and Sahaayta Counseling and Social Support to deliver services to New Zealand men considered at risk of committing domestic violence, to support them to change their behaviour. The "ground-breaking" programme removes men from the family home and places them in specially-run homes in order to support them to understand and change their behaviour. In nearly 60% of cases, men who have completed the programme do not go on to re-offend.

Patel is also a co-founder and director of Tamaki Health, a primary healthcare group.

Patel sits on a number of advisory boards, including New Zealand Police's National Ethnic Forum, the Mental Health Foundation and Diversity Works, New Zealand's national body for workplace diversity and inclusion.

== Honours and awards ==
In the 2009 New Year Honours, Patel was awarded the Queen's Service Medal, for services to the Indian community. In the 2017 New Year Honours, she was appointed an Officer of the New Zealand Order of Merit, for services to health and the Indian community. Also in 2017, Patel was the NEXT Woman of the Year in the Business & Innovation category.

In 2020, Patel received a Community Hero award at the New Zealand Women of Influence Awards, for her work reducing family violence. In 2021, she was awarded Innovator of the Year in the New Zealander of the Year Awards.

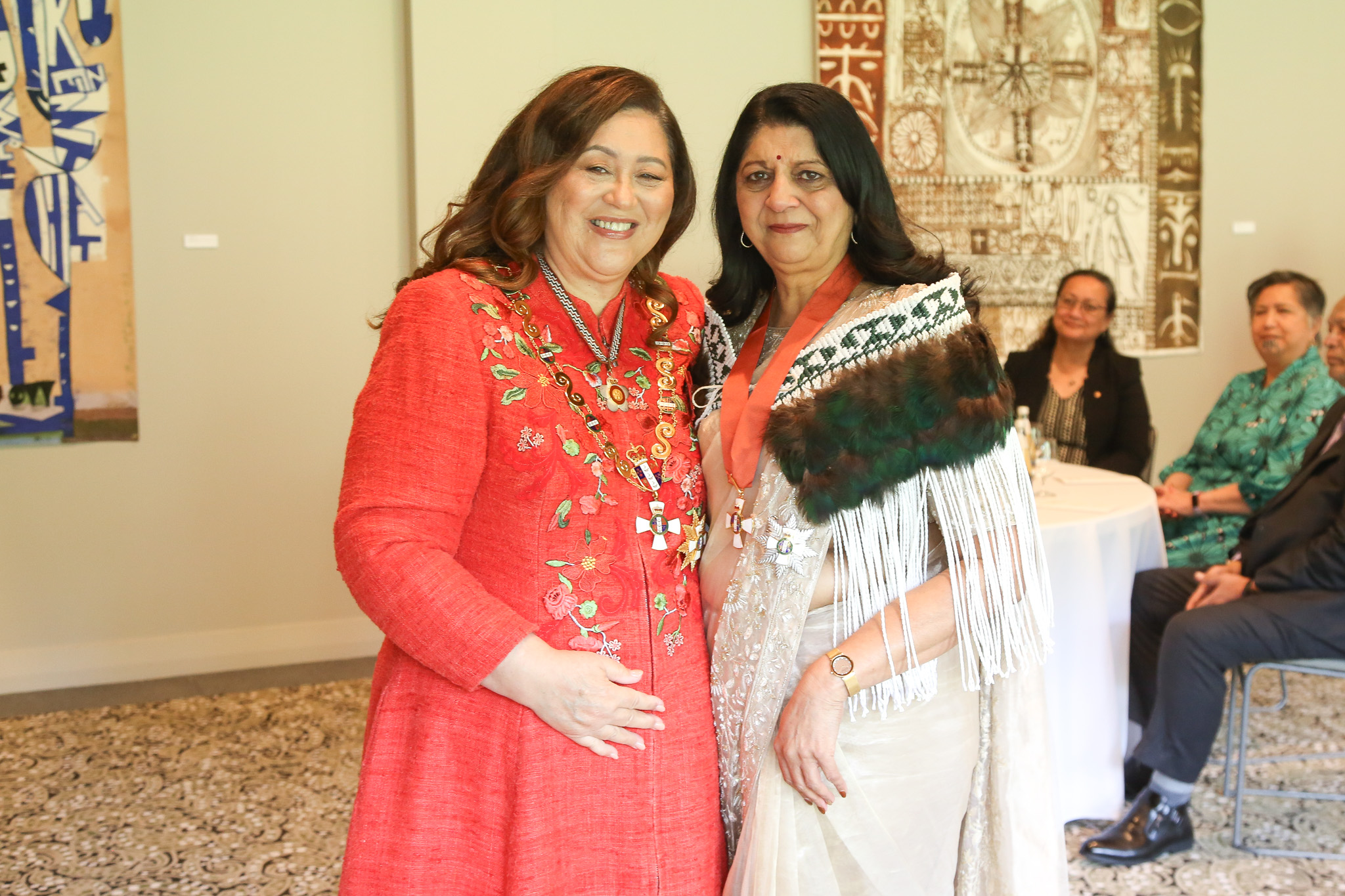
Patel (right), after her investiture as a Dame Companion of the New Zealand Order of Merit by the governor-general, Dame Cindy Kiro, at Government House, Auckland, on 30 September 2025

In the 2025 King’s Birthday Honours, Patel was promoted to Dame Companion of the New Zealand Order of Merit, for services to ethnic communities, health and family violence prevention.
