= The Mind Lab =

New Zealand Private Training Establishment

Coordinates: 36.8649169°S 174.7643042°E

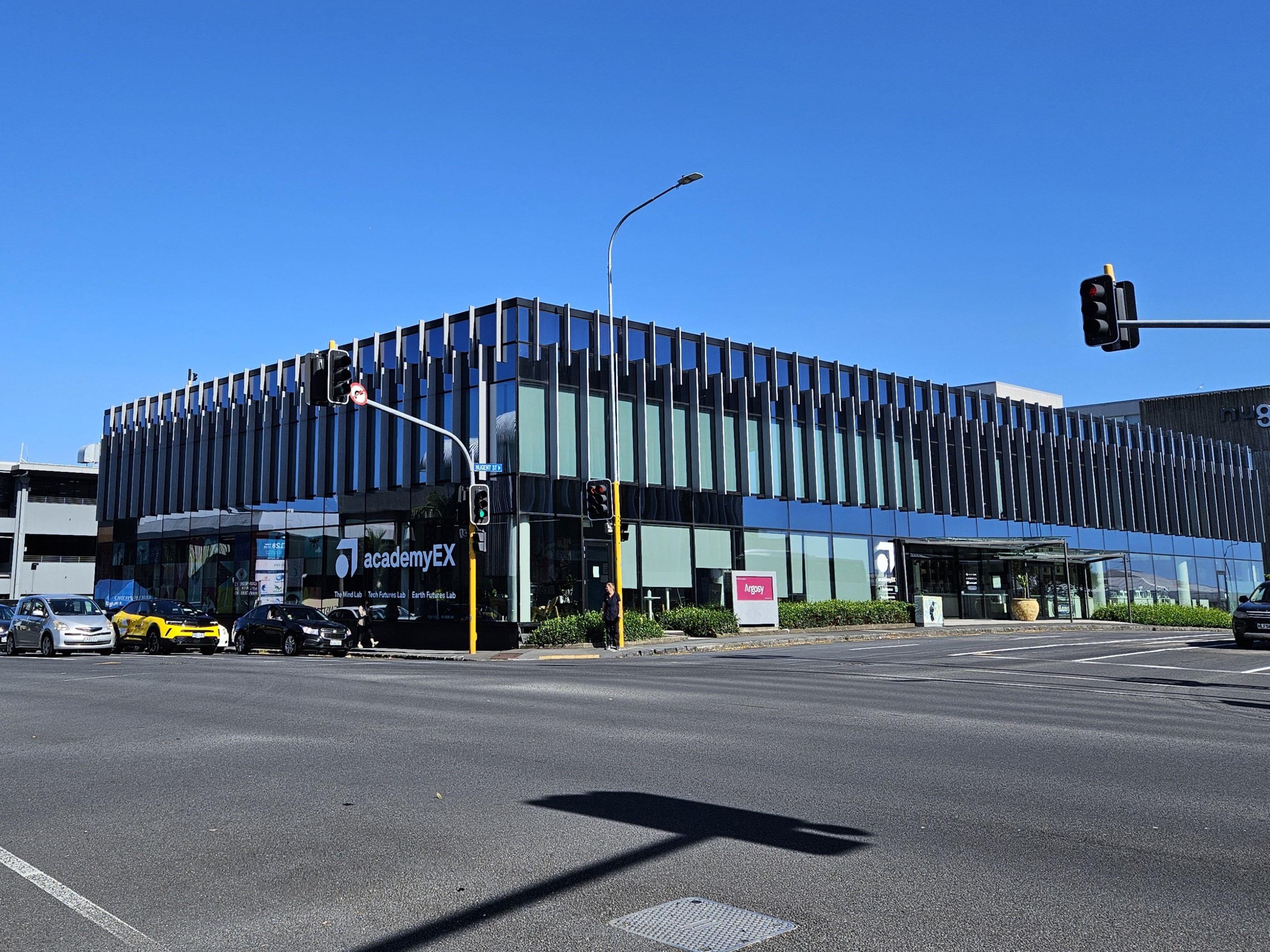
AcademyEX campus on Khyber Pass Road, Auckland

The Mind Lab is a New Zealand private training establishment (PTE) that has degree-awarding powers through the New Zealand Qualifications Authority (NZQA), identified as The Mind Lab Limited Partnership. It is based in Auckland.

== Origins ==
The Mind Lab was originally established by Frances Valintine in 2013 as a space where school-aged children could learn about science, technology and creative media. Unlike traditional education spaces, it was designed so that students could be given a problem and asked to collaborate to figure out solutions. At one point there were labs in Auckland, Wellington, Christchurch and Gisborne. However, as the organization moved into the tertiary education space, this part of the business was gradually wound down, and in Auckland was subsumed into the educational activities of MOTAT. Online learning resources for children have, however, continued in the form of the Mind Lab Kids website, supported through a partnership with Genesis Energy

== Partnership with Unitec ==
In 2014, The Mind Lab established a partnership with Unitec Institute of Technology to deliver a Postgraduate Certificate in Applied Practice with a specialization in digital and collaborative learning. In this partnership it was known as The Mind Lab by Unitec. Between 2015 and 2018, The NEXT Foundation provided fees scholarships for in-service teachers to enroll in the postgraduate certificate programme. They also funded the NEXT Foundation Expert Teacher Award for the highest performing graduates.

Further qualifications were subsequently added to the Unitec partnership portfolio; the Master of Technological Futures (through The Mind Lab's sister organization Tech Futures Lab) and the Master of Teaching and Educational Leadership, alongside Teach First NZ / Ako Mātātutpu.

== The Mind Lab as a Private Training Establishment ==
The partnership with Unitec came to an end in 2018 when The Mind Lab became an independent PTE, and dropped "by Unitec" from its name. It has subsequently added several more academic programmes to its prospectus.

In 2020, The Mind Lab launched one of the first micro-credentials in New Zealand at level 7 of the NZ qualifications framework. This micro-credential, Digital Skills for the Workplace, was offered free in 2020 in response to the COVID-19 pandemic.

In 2021 The Mind Lab was rated category 1 by NZQA following an external evaluation and review.
