= Helen Robinson (businesswoman) =

New Zealand businesswoman

- Born: 1965 (age 60–61); New Zealand
- Occupation: Businesswoman
- Known for: Founder of social enterprise Organic Initiative

Helen Robinson is a New Zealand businesswoman and company director from New Zealand.

== Life ==
Robinson was born in Christchurch, New Zealand. She moved to Auckland as a child, where she attended Carmel College. Her first job was in a bank, followed by a position as data processing manager at an importing and distribution company. She worked in a number of technology-related roles, including chief executive of Microsoft New Zealand, a position she left in 2007.

In 2008 she helped launched the TZ1 Registry which became the largest environmental asset registry worldwide within four months of its establishment. She also sits on a number of boards, including Auckland Tourism, Events and Economic Development and the government-owned Network for Learning, a company that helps schools around the country access reliable, fast and safe internet connections with uncapped data. She is also a member of the board of The Open Polytechnic of New Zealand, the New Zealand Business Excellence Foundation and Sir Ray Avery’s Mondiale Technologies.

With business partner Bridget Healy, Robinson founded Organic Initiative, or "Oi", a company producing affordable. biodegradable menstrual products.

=== Recognition ===
In 2016 Robinson received the Board and Management Award, as well as the Supreme Award, at the New Zealand Women of Influence Awards.

In 2019, Robinson was the NEXT Woman of the Year in the Business and Innovation category.

in 2018 Robinson was made a New Zealand Officer of Merit in the Queens Honours awards for services to technology and business.
