= Richard Faull =

New Zealand neuroscientist and academic

Sir Richard Faull
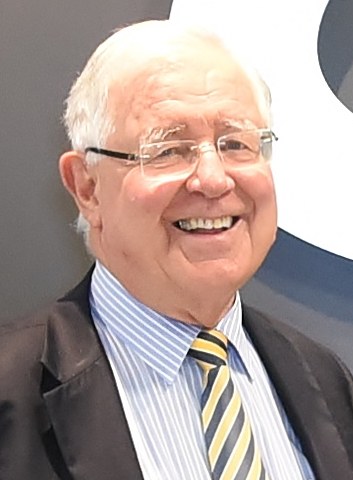
- Faull in 2017
- Born: Richard Lewis Maxwell Faull; 21 October 1945 (age 81)
- Alma mater: University of Otago (BMedSc 1967; MB ChB 1970); University of Auckland (PhD 1975; DSc 1994)
- Known for: Research on the human brain in neurodegenerative disease; Neurological Foundation Human Brain Bank; Evidence of neurogenesis in the adult human brain
- Awards: Liley Medal (2005); Rutherford Medal (2007); Knight Companion of the New Zealand Order of Merit (2017)
- Scientific career
- Fields: Neuroscience; neuroanatomy
- Workplaces: University of Auckland
- Doctoral advisor: J. B. Carman

Sir Richard Lewis Maxwell Faull KNZM FRSNZ (born 21 October 1945) is a New Zealand neuroscientist and academic who specialises in human neurodegenerative diseases. He is a Distinguished Professor at the University of Auckland, where he established the Neurological Foundation Human Brain Bank and was the founding director of the Centre for Brain Research. His research on donated human brains has centred on Huntington's disease, and extends to Alzheimer's disease, Parkinson's disease, epilepsy, motor neuron disease and schizophrenia.

== Early life and education ==
Faull is of Ngāti Rāhiri and Te Āti Awa descent, and a fifth-generation descendant of both a Māori whānau and a Cornish tin-mining family that emigrated to New Plymouth in 1841. He grew up with four brothers in Tikorangi, Taranaki, where his parents, Phyllis Thelma Faull (née Rogers) and Wilfred Lewis Faull, had a general store. In 1962 he was dux of Waitara High School and the inaugural recipient of the Sir Peter Buck (Te Rangi Hīroa) Memorial Medal; he attended New Plymouth Boys' High School in 1963 and studied at the University of Auckland from 1964, supported by a Taranaki Scholarship (1964–70).

He studied at the University of Otago Medical School from 1965 to 1970. As a third-year student he won the AFJ Mickle Scholarship in medicine and spent a year in the Department of Anatomy researching the basal ganglia of the rat brain, discovering a new pathway related to Parkinson's disease, and he completed a Bachelor of Medical Science in 1967. He earned his Bachelor of Medicine and Surgery (MB ChB) in 1970 and spent a year as a house surgeon with the Auckland Hospital Board.

With a Medical Research Council training fellowship he joined the University of Auckland's Department of Anatomy in 1972, and he completed a PhD in neuroanatomy in 1975 under J. B. Carman, on the connections of the cerebellum and basal ganglia. He was the first PhD graduate in neuroscience at the University of Auckland School of Medicine. He later received a Doctor of Science in neuroscience from Auckland (1994). Faull and his wife, Diana, have five children and 11 grandchildren.

== Career ==
=== Early career ===
From 1975 to 1978 Faull held a Harkness Fellowship of the Commonwealth Fund of New York and an overseas research fellowship of the Medical Research Council of New Zealand, working in the United States with W. R. Mehler at NASA's Ames Research Center and W. J. H. Nauta at the Massachusetts Institute of Technology. The Medical Research Council fellowship also funded visits to brain research institutes in Europe and the United Kingdom. He returned to the University of Auckland as a senior lecturer in anatomy in 1978 and was promoted to associate professor in 1987. He was preclinical sub-dean in 1987–88 and Head of the Department of Anatomy (with Radiology) from 1988 to 2000, and in 1989 held a Wellcome–MRC research travel fellowship at the Babraham Institute in Cambridge. He was awarded a Personal Chair in Anatomy in 1993 and, in 2012, was appointed a University Distinguished Professor.

=== The Human Brain Bank ===
In 1981 Faull started receiving postmortem human brains from families of people with suspected Huntington's disease who wanted the diagnosis confirmed. The families donated their loved ones' brains for research, and this began his research on human brain diseases, including Huntington's disease, Parkinson's disease, Alzheimer's disease, motor neurone disease, epilepsy and schizophrenia. In 1994 the Neurological Foundation of New Zealand began funding the expanding human brain bank, which Faull named the Neurological Foundation Human Brain Bank at the University of Auckland. Built in partnership with the community and with families affected by brain disease, the bank has been described by the Neurological Foundation as one of the best in the world because the families not only donate the brain of their loved one but also provide the life story of their loved one's clinical journey and give permission to access all medical records. The bank underpins much of his research and that of overseas collaborators, and holds more than 1,000 brains.

=== Research team ===
Around the brain bank he developed an expanding multidisciplinary collaborative research team that was anchored by neuropsychologist Lynette Tippett, neuropharmacologist Mike Dragunow, geneticist Russell Snell and neuroscientist Maurice Curtis. Faull's human brain research programme received continuous Health Research Council funding for over 30 years.

=== Centre for Brain Research ===
In 2009 Faull established the University of Auckland's Centre for Brain Research (CBR), to facilitate collaborative interactions among the different brain research groups across the University and clinicians in the Auckland Hospitals, and to promote the development of new treatments for brain disease. The centre brings together over 90 research groups and more than 500 researchers across the university, with more than 40 clinicians in the Auckland hospitals and more than 20 community neurological organisations. It has worked with Māori communities across Aotearoa, including marae visits and research and care clinics on marae in Northland, Tāmaki Makaurau and Taranaki. In its first 15 years the centre raised more than NZ$80 million in philanthropic funding to support new research initiatives. Faull was its foundation director for 16 years and in 2025, at the age of 80, moved to a part-time role.

=== Brain Research New Zealand ===
In 2014 the Tertiary Education Commission appointed Faull and Cliff Abraham of the University of Otago co-directors of the Centre of Research Excellence "Brain Research New Zealand – Rangahau Roro Aotearoa". It received NZ$29.8 million over six years from 2015 for collaborative research on the ageing brain involving 68 research groups at four universities, and Faull was co-director until 2018.

=== University and national service ===
Faull sat on the University of Auckland's Senate and, from 2001 to 2009, on its Council as the representative of academic staff, and he was a member of the committee that selected the university's vice-chancellor in 2003–04. He chaired the New Zealand Harkness Fellowships Trust from 2000 to 2016, and is a past president of the International Basal Ganglia Society.

== Research ==
=== Huntington's disease ===
Faull's work on Huntington's disease draws on brains donated by Huntington's families in New Zealand. His group reported loss of cannabinoid receptors in the substantia nigra (1993), regional and cellular changes in gene expression (2006), cell loss in the motor and cingulate cortex that correlates with symptoms (2010), and cerebellar degeneration that correlates with motor symptoms (2019). With groups in Australia, the United States and the United Kingdom, it also helped establish the first transgenic sheep model of Huntington's disease (2010), later used to study metabolic changes in the disease.

=== Neurogenesis ===
Faull's group's research on neurogenesis in the adult human brain began with a 2003 paper in the Proceedings of the National Academy of Sciences reporting increased cell proliferation and neurogenesis in the brains of people with Huntington's disease. Coverage of the work in 2007 described it as showing that the brain can repair itself by generating new cells. A 2007 paper in Science by Curtis, Faull and collaborators in Sweden reported that neuroblasts migrate to the olfactory bulb via a lateral ventricular extension in the human brain, and it was featured on the journal's front cover. Faull has described his team as the first to show that the adult human brain generates new cells. The paper drew a published comment in Science, to which Curtis, Faull and colleagues replied.

=== Alzheimer's and Parkinson's diseases ===
In Alzheimer's disease, Faull's group showed that brain-derived neurotrophic factor is reduced (1997), and later studies examined changes in GABAergic signalling and, with Curtis and others, inflammatory cytokines in the cortex in normal ageing, motor neurone disease and Alzheimer's disease (2021). In Parkinson's disease the group contributed to the localisation of LRRK2 in the brain (2006).

=== Epilepsy and motor neuron disease ===
Studies of resected human tissue in epilepsy have examined glutamate transporters (1999), doublecortin expression (2008) and microglia in mesial temporal lobe epilepsy (2022). In motor neuron disease, work with Emma Scotter and colleagues found that leakage of the blood–spinal cord barrier is independent of motor neuron pathology in ALS (2021).

=== X-linked dystonia-parkinsonism ===
In October 2017 Faull travelled to Manila to give a lecture series at Makati Medical Center, advising neuropathologists and clinicians on postmortem brain tissue analysis in support of research on X-linked dystonia-parkinsonism, a disease that mainly affects people of Filipino descent. His group has since contributed to studies of striatal degeneration in the disease and of banking brain tissue from it.

=== Publications ===
According to his CV, Faull has published more than 460 research papers, and as of 29 October 2026 Google Scholar listed more than 51,000 citations of his work, with an h-index of 118.

== Honours and awards ==
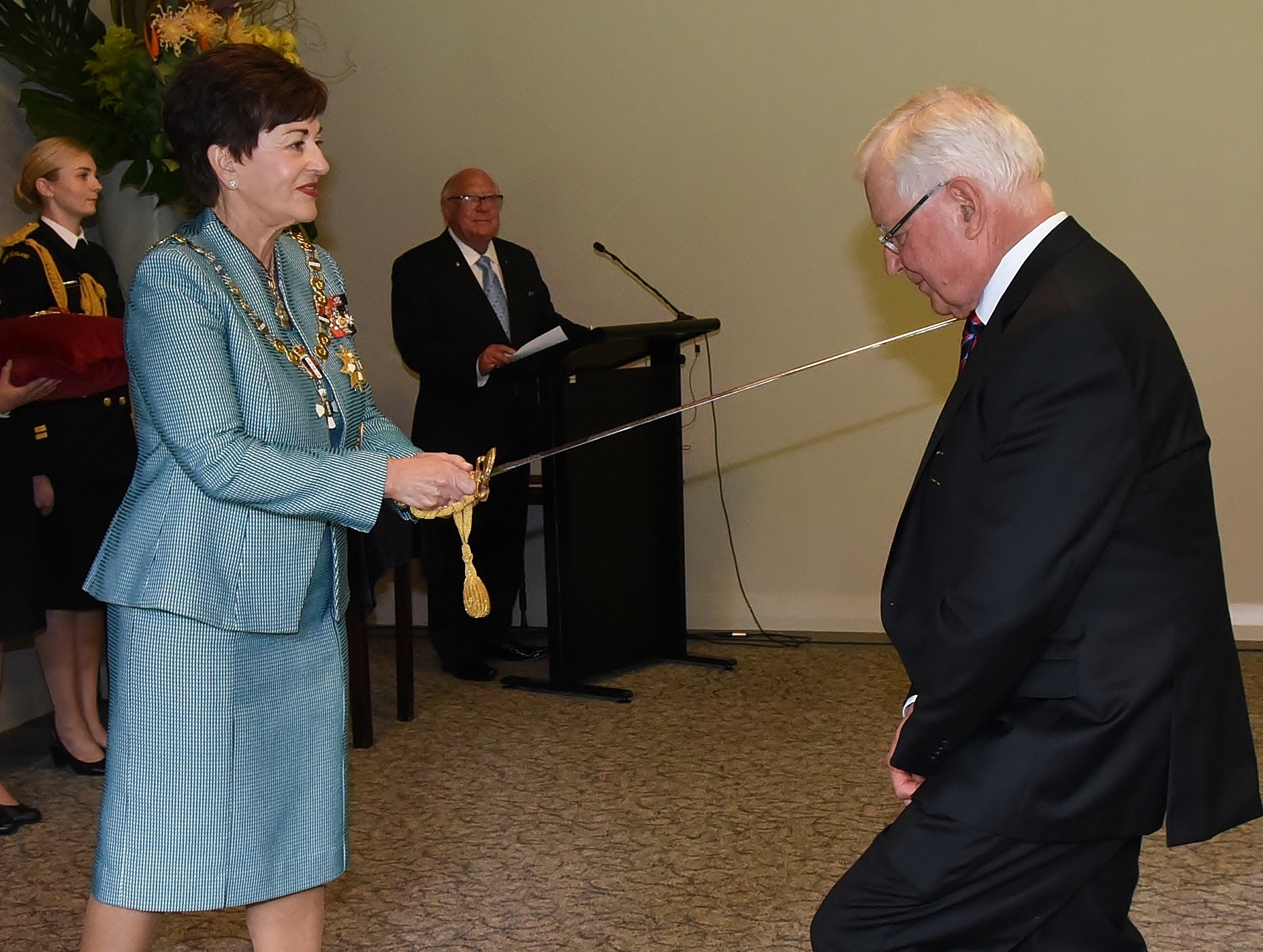
Faull's investiture as a Knight Companion of the New Zealand Order of Merit by the Governor-General, Dame Patsy Reddy, on 26 April 2017

- 1998: Fellow of the Royal Society of New Zealand
- 2001: University of Auckland Distinguished Teaching Award
- 2002: inaugural Peter Gluckman Medal, and Distinguished Faculty International Lecturer, University of Auckland
- 2003 and 2007: nominated New Zealander of the Year by The New Zealand Herald
- 2005: Liley Medal of the Health Research Council of New Zealand
- 2005: Officer of the New Zealand Order of Merit (ONZM), for services to medical research
- 2007: Rutherford Medal of the Royal Society of New Zealand
- 2009: New Zealand Scientist of the Year, North & South
- 2010: Supreme Award at the World Class New Zealand Awards, presented by New Zealand Trade and Enterprise and Kea New Zealand
- 2016: Health Research Council 25th Anniversary Senior Research Excellence Award; University of Auckland John Hood Fellowship
- 2017: Knight Companion of the New Zealand Order of Merit (KNZM), for services to medical research
- 2023: kōrowai (cloak) and tokotoko (carved stick) bestowed at Waipapa Marae, in recognition of his work establishing links between the Māori community and neuroscience
- 2024: Honorary Doctor of Science, University of Otago
- 2026: finalist, New Zealander of the Year Awards

== Patronage ==
Faull is patron of Alzheimers New Zealand, the Auckland Huntington's Disease Association, and the Motor Neurone Disease Association of New Zealand, among other organisations, and in 2025 became the inaugural patron of the Mātai Medical Research Institute in Gisborne.
