= Wildfire Interactive =

American software company

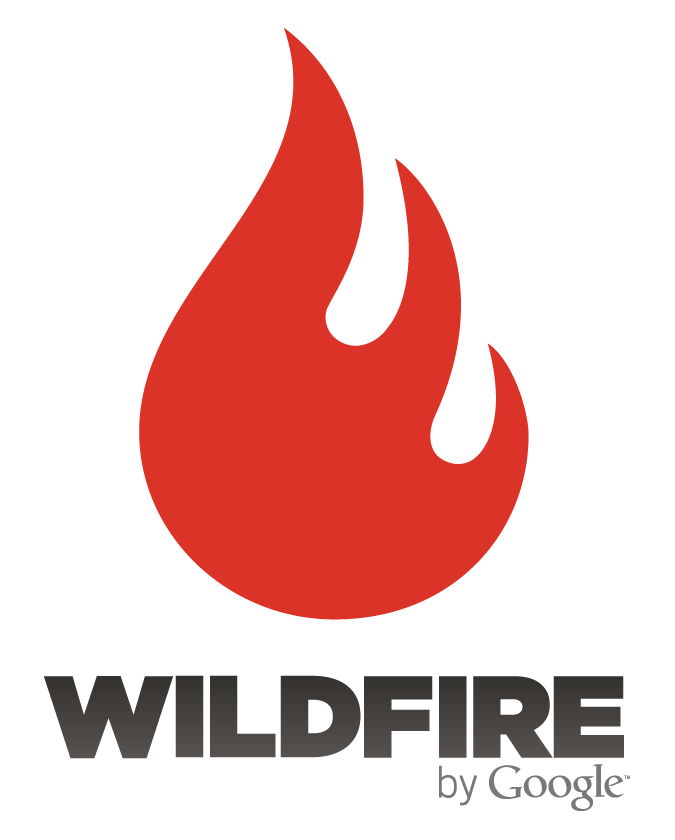
- Industry: Social marketing SaaS
- Founded: 2008
- Founders: Alain Chuard, Victoria Ransom
- Fate: Acquired by Google, 2012

Wildfire Interactive Inc, or Wildfire, was a startup software company based in Redwood City that developed a social marketing application that enabled businesses to create, optimize and measure their presence on social networks such as Facebook, Twitter, Pinterest and YouTube. It was founded in 2008 by Victoria Ransom and Alain Chuard.

Google acquired Wildfire in 2012 for a reported $450 million. In 2014, Wildfire announced it would be integrated into Google's general adtech platform DoubleClick.

== Company history ==
Wildfire was founded by Victoria Ransom and Alain Chuard who needed to develop their own social-marketing campaign for their adventure-travel company Access Trips. The tool was originally called Promotion Builder and focused on developing social media marketing campaigns including sweepstakes, user-generated contests, quizzes and coupons. In the summer of 2009, the expanded platform was officially launched.

In 2008, Ransom and Chuard applied for the Facebook Fund and received a $250,000 grant. Wildfire generated $100,000 in revenue within the first month of public launch. They raised a Series A round of $4 million in May 2010 and a second round of funding of $10 million in 2012. Investors included Summit Partners, Facebook, Accel Partners and the Founder's Fund. From 2008–2012, Wildfire grew to include 400 employees. The company was named one of the top 10 places to work in the Bay Area in 2011 and 2012.

Google purchased Wildfire in July 2012 for a reported $450 million. In 2014, Google announced that Wildfire's social analytics would be supported through integration into Google's general ad technology platform DoubleClick. Further investments into development would be limited and the application would not be adding features or signing new clients.

== Overview ==
Wildfire allowed clients to engage and monetize customers through Facebook, Twitter, Pinterest, LinkedIn and Google+. The app's components included Pages, Promotions, Ads, Messages, and Monitoring. Users could schedule content deployment to multiple properties with campaigns able to be customized depending on the size and the needs of the business.
