= Alain Chuard =

Swiss entrepreneur and snowboarder

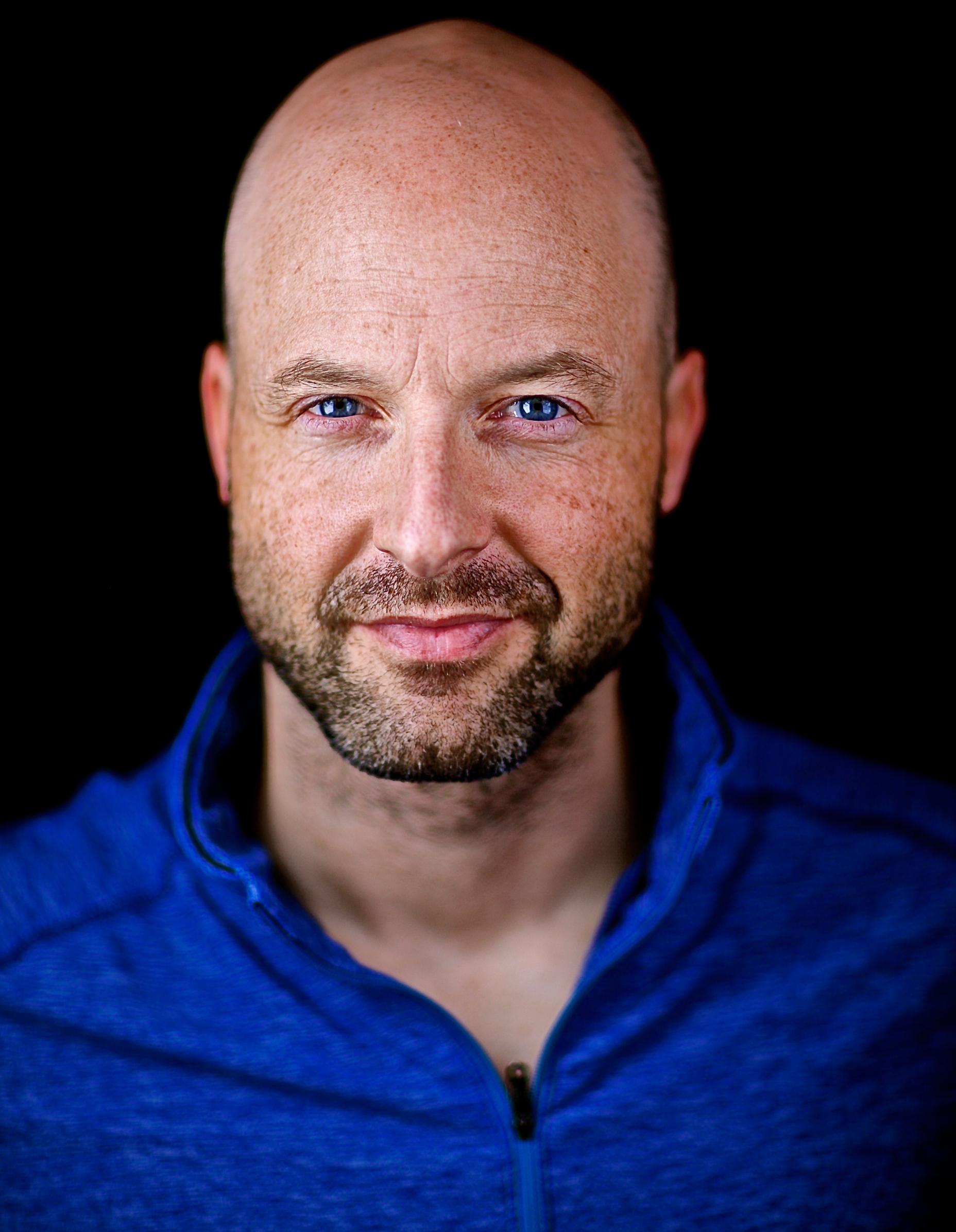
- Born: Alain Marc Chuard; Bern, Switzerland
- Education: Macalester College; Stanford Graduate School of Business
- Occupations: Entrepreneur; Former professional snowboarder
- Spouse: Victoria Ransom (m. 2013)
- Children: 3
- Website: www.alainchuard.com

Alain Chuard is a Swiss entrepreneur and former professional snowboarder living in Palo Alto, California. He is best known as the founder and Chief product officer of Wildfire Interactive, the social media marketing technology company acquired by Google in July 2012.

== Early life and education ==
Chuard was born in Bern and raised in the Swiss town of Bolligen. His father and uncle were both entrepreneurs.

Chuard competed on the snowboard World-Cup Pro Tour while in high school. From 1994-96, he was ranked in the top 4 snowboarders in Switzerland. Chuard was sponsored by Burton Snowboards and has appeared in various snowboarding publications including the cover of Transworld Snowboarding.

Chuard left Switzerland at the age of 20 after completing his high school matura. Chuard studied mathematics and economics at Macalester College. He has an MBA from Stanford Graduate School of Business.

== Career ==
After graduating from Macalester College, he spent two years working as a financial analyst for Salomon Smith Barney in New York City. He then left Wall Street to start the adventure travel company, Access Trips, in 2001. While getting his MBA, he also built an online booking and CRM software called IncFuel Corp. In the summer of 2007, he was an Entrepreneur in Residence at Highland Capital Partners in Boston.

In 2008, Chuard developed the software Promotion Builder as an online marketing tool used for promoting Access Trips through social media. Promotion Builder became Wildfire Interactive and within four years, Wildfire grew to a company with 400 employees. In 2010, Chuard sold Access Trips in order to focus on Wildfire. In July 2012, Google purchased Wildfire for a reported $450 million. Following Wildfire's incorporation, Chuard became Head of Product of Google My Business until his and Ransom's departure in 2015. He is a Henry Crown Fellow of the Aspen Institute.

In 2016, Chuard, together with Christian Hirsig as host, set up the non-profit organization Swisspreneur, Switzerland’s biggest business podcast publisher, which encourages entrepreneurship in Switzerland through interviews with Swiss start-up founders.

In August 2020, it was reported that the self−funded edtech startup Prisma, created by Chuard and his wife Victoria Ransom, would launch on 8 September 2020, for 40 U.S. students. In July 2021, Chuard was named as the Founder and CEO of Prisma.

== Personal life ==
Chuard married Victoria Ransom in March 2013 and is the father of three children. They met in December 1999 while studying at Macalester College. He speaks four languages and is one of the 300 wealthiest people in Switzerland.

== Publications ==
- Podcast: The Founder’s Playbook – Swisspreneur EP #200 – November 11, 2021
