= Molecular Brain Research =

- Discipline: Molecular neuroscience
- Language: English

Publication details
- History: 1989–2005 (merged with Brain Research)
- Publisher: Elsevier

Standard abbreviations
- ISO 4: Mol. Brain Res.

Indexing
- ISSN: 0169-328X

Links
- Journal homepage

Molecular Brain Research was a peer-reviewed scientific journal of molecular neuroscience. It was established in 1989 and was merged with Brain Research in 2006.
