= KidsCan =

Charitable trust in New Zealand

KidsCan Charitable Trust
- Founded: 2005
- Founder: Dame Julie Chapman (nee Helson)
- Type: Charitable trust
- Location: Auckland, New Zealand
- Region served: New Zealand
- Method: Delivering targeted programmes which remove the physical barriers preventing children in low decile schools from getting the most out of their education.
- Key people: Dame Julie Chapman: Founder and CEO.
- Revenue: NZ$4.9 million (year ended December 2012)

The KidsCan Charitable Trust (trading as KidsCan) is a New Zealand based charitable trust. It was founded in 2005 in Greenhithe, Auckland, New Zealand by Julie Chapman and works to help address New Zealand kids living in poverty (defined as living at 60% or less of the median wage, or one in four New Zealand children) through a variety of programmes.

== Origin and funding ==
=== Julie Chapman ===
Born in about 1972 into a middle-class family, Chapman was inspired to found KidsCan after learning of children staying away from school because they didn't have raincoats. Initially, when she heard of the problem she thought there might be a few hundred children impacted nationally, but in a rough survey of 80 low-decile schools she found that there were thousands of children impacted. In recognition of her work and for services to children and the community, Chapman was made a Dame Companion of the New Zealand Order of Merit in the 2025 New Year Honours (New Zealand).

=== Initial organisation ===
KidsCan was founded by Julie Chapman in 2005 with a NZ$40,000 grant from Guardian Trust. She initially worked out of her garage.

In 2018 it provided support to over 171,000 kids in nearly 709 New Zealand low-decile schools nationwide. KidsCan is funded mainly by campaign income (donations), which make up around 30% of their revenue. 18% comes from business sponsorship while a further 6% comes from government support (mainly via the Ministry of Social Development, philanthropic trusts, and gaming revenue. Around 43% of revenue is made up of in kind gifts and donated goods.

== Aid programmes ==
The Charity runs a number of aid programmes: In Our Own Backyard, Food for Kids, Shoes for Kids, Raincoats for Kids, Warm Kids Cool Kids, and Health for Kids). In 2012 they provided food, socks, shoes, and raincoats to over 46,000 disadvantaged children. By 2018 this number had grown to 171,000 children in 709 schools across the country – mostly 1-4 decile schools.

=== Food for Kids ===
Providing nutritious and targeted food for 10,585 financially disadvantaged children across New Zealand every school day, either as a complete meal or to supplement what they have at home. 2.6 million items of food were provided for children with food insecurity in 2012. In 2019 the New Zealand government rolled out the Ka Ora, Ka Ako programme, a free school lunch programme in high needs areas. As this meant KidsCan no longer needed to provide school lunches they changed the focus of their programme to help at other times of the day.

=== Shoes for Kids ===
Providing a free pair of shoes and two pairs of socks for children coming to school in winter without footwear or with footwear that is in bad condition. Over 8,000 pairs of shoes and 16,000 pairs of socks were distributed in 2012.

=== Raincoats for Kids ===
Providing free fleece-lined, waterproof raincoats for kids whose families, struggling to make ends meet, often relegate as a lower-priority item. Schools recycle the raincoats every year and KidsCan tops them up as needed. 15,620 raincoats were distributed in 2013, in partnership with the New Zealand Warriors.

=== Warm Kids Cool Kids ===
Providing thermal tops and beanies during the winter months and sunhats during summer in partnership with The Warehouse. Over 17,000 hand-knitted beanies and 10,000 sunhats were handed out in 2012.

=== Health for Kids ===
A new initiative for 2013 providing nit treatment, nit combs, hand sanitiser, band-aids and tissues for KidsCan partner schools. Over 2000 children were supported when the programme launched in Kaitaia - over 1000 basic hygiene items and 290 prescription medicines were provided. KidsCan has also partnered with Lumino the Dentists to provide Lumino dental hygiene kits and free dental care to families of children at KidsCan partner schools on Lumino Day.

=== In Our Own Backyard ===
A child sponsorship programme which provides warm clothing, clothes, shoes, food, basic stationery and hygiene items for a child for a year. It costs NZ$15 a month, or NZ$180 a year. So far, about 4600 people have signed up to sponsor a child.

=== COVID-19 response ===
In response to the New Zealand government's Covid-19 lockdowns and their impact on poorer families KidsCan launched an urgent appeal to get food parcels to 2500 families in Auckland and Wellington.
