= Frances Valintine =

New Zealand businessperson and futurist

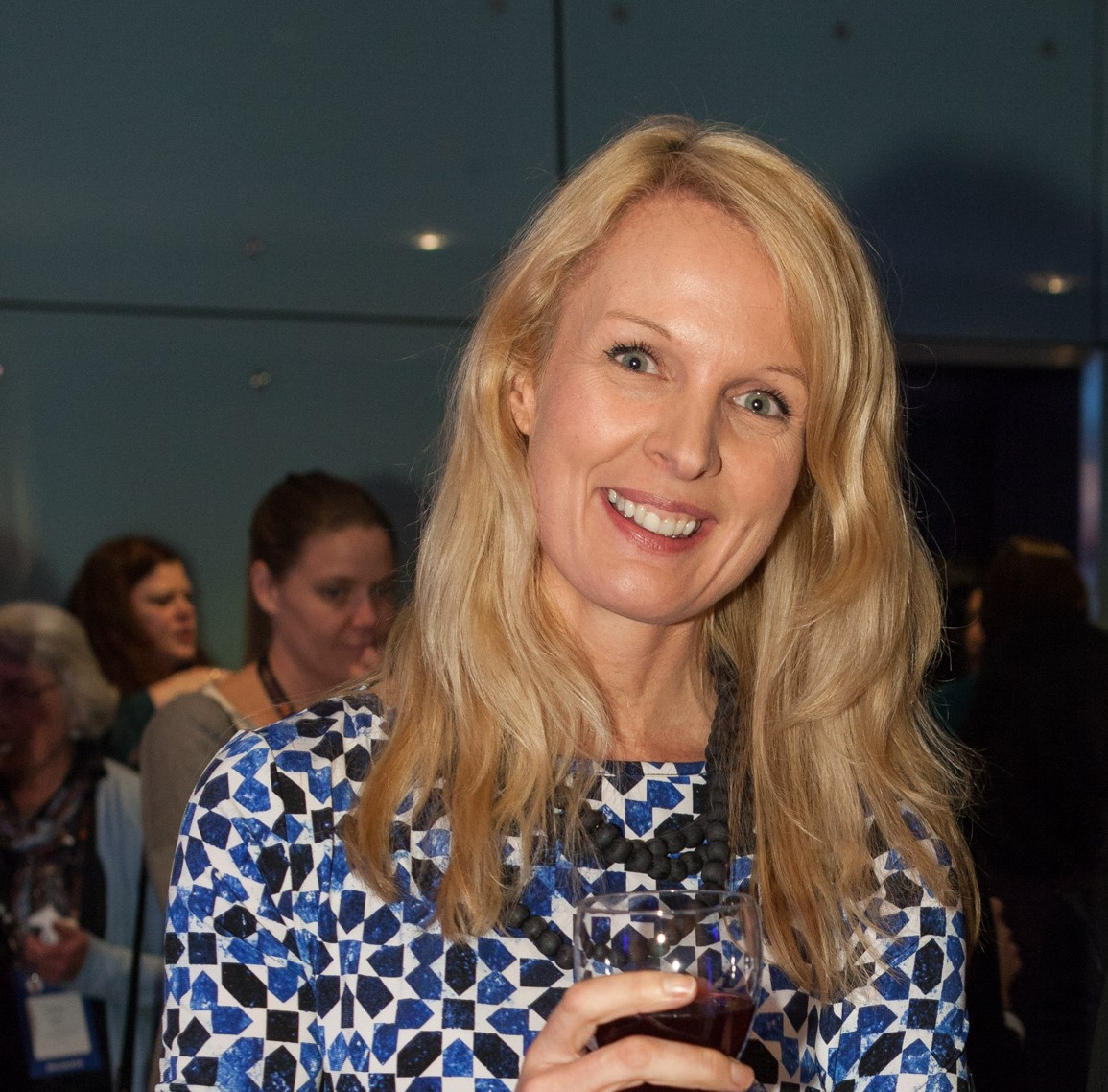
- Frances Valintine on 10 September 2014
- Born: Hāwera, New Zealand
- Education: University of Melbourne
- Occupation: Education futurist
- Known for: Founder of The Mind Lab & Tech Futures Lab

Frances Valintine CNZM is an education futurist from New Zealand. She has won numerous awards for her educational programmes and is the founder and Chair of The Mind Lab and Tech Futures Lab. and Tech Futures Lab. Frances is known for her commitment to working to improve the outcomes for the next generation through contextualising education delivery and content in the 21st century.

== Early life and education ==
Valintine was raised on a farm in Hāwera, Taranaki, and moved to Auckland's North Shore when she was about fourteen years old. She attended four different high schools.

When she was 17, she moved to London and then to Turkey before returning to New Zealand. After returning to New Zealand she initially worked bringing students from South-East Asia to study in New Zealand. In 2013 she studied part-time at the University of Melbourne for a master's degree in tertiary education management.

In 2016 Valintine attended Singularity University.

== Career ==
From 1998 to 2013 Valintine was at Media Design School, a private tertiary provider of creative and digital technology training. In 2011 it was bought by Laureate International Universities. Valintine continued in the role of CEO until 2013.

In 2013 Valintine opened The Mind Lab in Newmarket, Auckland. It aimed to provide students with different ways of learning and exploring, particularly using collaborative learning techniques, and with a focus on science, creative and technology programmes. While running the programmes, Valintine realised that teachers lacked training in this area, and in July 2014 The Mind Lab launched a postgraduate programme in digital and collaborative learning. The organisation expanded into other centres to meet demand for its programmes, opening centres in Gisborne, Wellington, Christchurch and satellite centres in 16 other regional centres including Whangarei, Rotorua, Ruatoria, Whanganui, Whakatane, Tauranga, Masterton, Balclutha, Invercargill, Dunedin, Rolleston, New Plymouth and Hamilton.

In January 2016 Valintine launched Tech Futures Lab to help business executives prepare for the future with a focus on business disruption, the impact of technological advances especially in the fields of automation & robotics, machine learning & artificial intelligence and data science.

Valintine sits on the board of Callaghan Innovation, KEA, Talentnomics (WashingtonDC). She was previously on the boards of Education New Zealand, NZTech and the New Zealand Game Developers Association, Santa Fe University of Art and Design, Auckland Screen & Digital Content and a member of the Small Business Development Group.

Frances is a member of Global Women.

== Awards ==
In 2014 The Mind Lab won Best Engagement of Youth in ICT at the NZ CIO Awards and Best Start-Up in Asia Pacific judged by Richard Branson and Steve Wozniak. The same year, it won the Excellence in Social Innovation Award at the New Zealand Innovators Awards.

In 2015, Valintine was named NEXT Woman of the Year in education, she was named one of the Top 10 most influential women by Idealog and also received the New Zealand Women of Influence Award in innovation.

In 2016, Valintine received a Blake Leader Award from the Sir Peter Blake Trust. and she was named one of the Top 50 EdTech Educators in the world alongside people such as Salmon Khan and Satya Nitta. Frances also won the New Zealand Walk the Talk Award and the NZ Diversity Awards.

In 2016 her business The Mind Lab won the NZ CIO Award for best Engagement of Youth in ICT for the second time in three years.

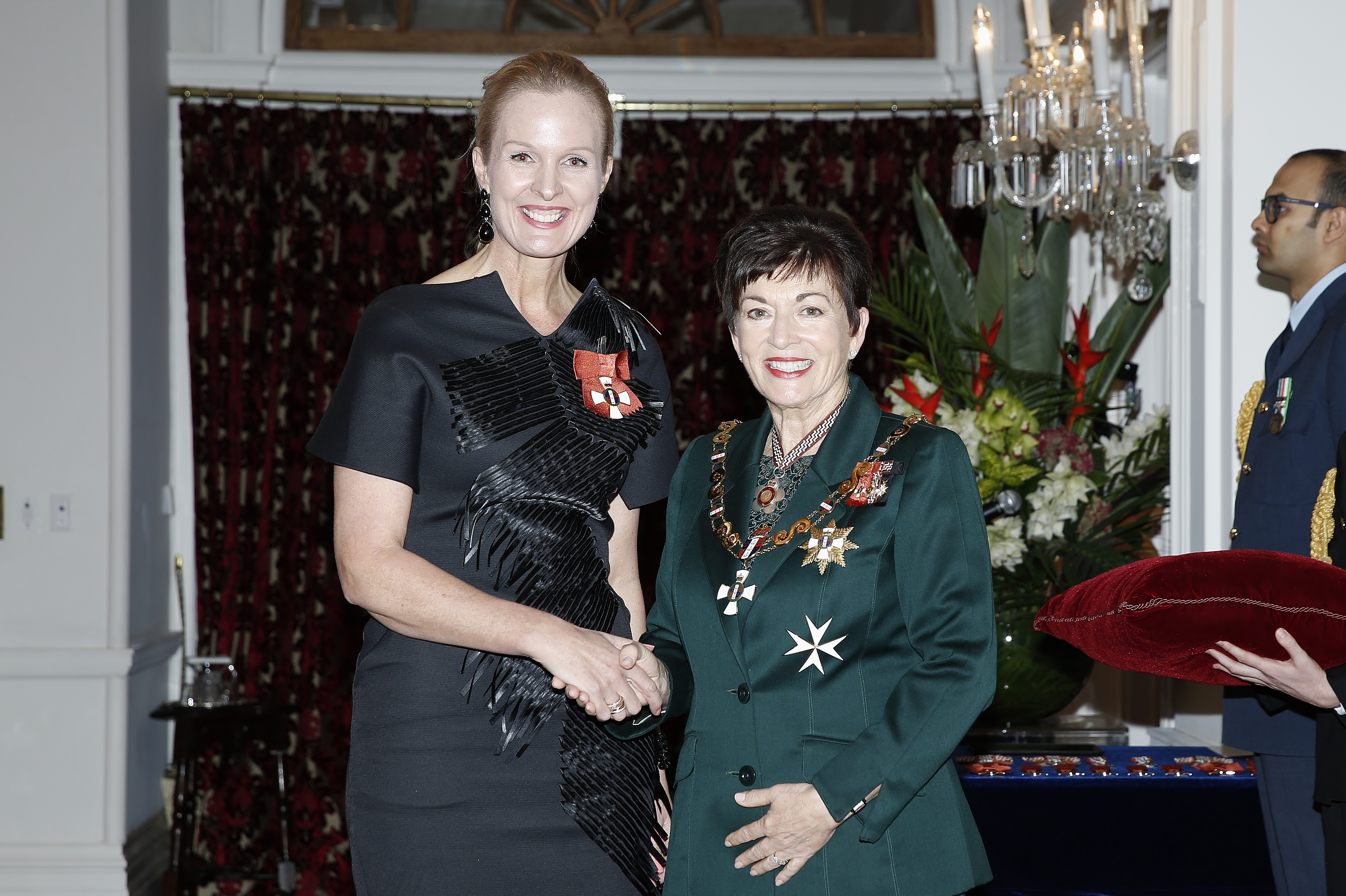
Valintine (left) in 2018, after her investiture as a Companion of the New Zealand Order of Merit by the governor-general, Dame Patsy Reddy

In the 2018 New Year Honours, Valintine was appointed a Companion of the New Zealand Order of Merit, for services to education and the technology sector.
