= Hip Op-eration =

New Zealand Hip Hop dance troupe with average age of 80

- Origin: Waiheke Island, New Zealand
- Genres: Hip-hop, voguing, waacking, house dance, popping, dancehall, lyrical hip hop, krumping
- Years active: 2012–present
- Members: Kara “Bang Bang” Nelson (94, with cane); Maynie "Quicksilver" Thompson (95); Terri "2-cents" Wool-Moore Goodwin (94); Eileen "Diva mystic" Evans (84); Rosemary "Missy Ro-Yo" McKenzie (74)
- Website: www.hipop-eration.com

Hip Op-eration Dance Crew (also known as Hip Op-eration) is a hip-hop dance crew from Waiheke Island, New Zealand. Hip Op-eration were formed in 2012, with originally over forty members. They are managed by their coach and caregiver Billie Jordan. In 2013, Hip Op-eration performed at the World Hip Hop Dance Championships (HHI) in Las Vegas. In their debut year, they had a documentary crew filming them and were interviewed by The Wall Street Journal and the BBC.

== Background ==
Billie Jordan achieved her first success when her "Hip Op-eration" troupe's flash mob video went viral in 2012. Encouraged by positive reviews, they decided to enter a Hip-Hop contest as a way of promoting fitness and Hip Hop while bridging the generation gap. Of the 40+ troupe members, over 20 eventually travelled to the Hip Hop International championships in Las Vegas in 2013, where they performed in the special exhibition category as "The World's Oldest Dance Crew". No mention is made in the film of the other winners and medallists of the Las Vegas championships, though there were 4 medal-winning dance crews from New Zealand that year.

In 2014 a documentary was released about them called Hip Hop-eration.

Awards and achievements
Preceded by (France) Les Twins	World Hip Hop Dance Championships; Special Performance; 2013	Succeeded by (New Zealand) Royal Family
