= Neuropharmacology (journal) =

Peer-reviewed scientific journal

- Discipline: Neuroscience
- Language: English
- Edited by: Jared W. Young

Publication details
- Former name(s): International Journal of Neuropharmacology
- History: 1962–present
- Publisher: Elsevier
- Frequency: 16/year
- Impact factor: 4.6 (2024)

Standard abbreviations
- ISO 4: Neuropharmacology

Indexing
- CODEN: NEPHBW
- ISSN: 0028-3908 (print); 1873-7064 (web)
- OCLC no.: 01796748

Links
- Journal homepage; Online archive

Neuropharmacology is a peer-reviewed scientific journal in the field of neuroscience. Its focus is on research investigating how chemical agents—both naturally occurring and synthetic—affect neurobiological processes, primarily in mammals.

It was established in 1962 as the International Journal of Neuropharmacology and obtained its current name in 1970. The editor-in-chief is Jared W. Young (University of California, San Diego) who succeeded Bruno Frenguelli (University of Warwick). According to the Journal Citation Reports, the journal has a 2024 impact factor of 4.6.
