= My Kitchen Rules NZ =

- Also known as: My Kitchen Rules New Zealand
- Genre: Cooking
- Judges: Ben Bayly (2014–2015); Gareth Stewart (2014–2015); Pete Evans (2017-2018); Manu Feildel (2017-2024); Colin Fassnidge (2023-2024)
- Country of origin: New Zealand
- Original language: English
- No. of series: 5
- No. of episodes: 59

Production
- Running time: 60-120 minutes per episode
- Production companies: Seven Network (2017); ScreenTime New Zealand (2023)

Original release
- Network: TVNZ
- Release: 24 August 2014 – present

Related
- My Kitchen Rules; My Kitchen Rules SA

My Kitchen Rules NZ is a New Zealand reality show based on the popular Australian reality television series My Kitchen Rules. The show premiered in New Zealand on TV1 on 24 August 2014.

Season 2 premiered on TV2 on 12 October 2015. On 29 September 2016, Pete Evans and Manu Feildel, hosts of the Australian MKR, were announced as the hosts for the third season of My Kitchen Rules NZ, which began airing on 25 September 2017. Evans and Feildel also judged season 4, which aired in 2018.

In November 2022, the series was renewed for a fifth season, four years after the previous, which will see Manu Feildel returning as host alongside new host and judge Colin Fassnidge, set to air in 2023 on TVNZ 2. The winning team receives NZ$100,000 prize money.

The series was then renewed for a sixth season with Feildel and Fassinidge returning as hosts. The sixth season is set to air April 2024 on TVNZ 2.

== Format ==
=== Contestants ===
The New Zealand version of the show initially had teams of two contestants with pre-existing relationships —competing against each other to transform an ordinary home into an instant restaurant complete with theme and table decorations for one pressure-cooker night.

Number of teams participated per series
Region		Series				
Region		One	Two	Three	Four	Five
Auckland	AUK	3	4	2	1	
Bay of Plenty	BOP	1	-	-	-	1
Tauranga	TGA	-	-	-	1	1
Whakatāne	WHK	-	-	-	1	
Rotorua	ROT	-	-	1	-	
Canterbury	CAN	2	1	-	-	
Christchurch	CHC	-	-	1	-	
Hawkes Bay	HKB	1	1	-	-	
Manawatū	MWT	1	2	-	-	
Otago	OTA	1	1	-	-	
Wānaka	WKA	-	-	1	-	
Taranaki	TKI	-	1	-	-	
Waikato	WKO	1	1	-	-	
Wellington	WGN	3	1	1	-	
New Plymouth	NPL	-	-	-	1	
Dunedin	DUN	-	-	-	1	
Total		13	12	6	6	

=== Judging panel ===
The current judging panel consists of celebrity chefs and hosts Pete Evans and Manu Feildel. Filling four spots in the Kitchen HQ judging table are local celebrity chef and former Masterchef NZ Winner, Nadia Lim; former Masterchef NZ judge, Ray McVinnie; 2016 Metropolitan Chef of the Year, Tom Hishon; and acclaimed restaurateur, Sean Connolly.

Judges	Series			
Judges	One	Two	Three	Four
Current
Manu Feildel			Host/Main	Host/Main
Former
Ray McVinnie			Guest	
Tom Hishon			Guest	
Sean Connolly	Guest		Guest	
Nadia Lim	Guest	Guest	Guest	
Robert Oliver	Guest	Guest		
Liz Egan		Guest		
Grace Ramirez	Guest	Guest		
Pete Evans			Host/Main	
Ben Bayly	Host/Main	Host/Main		
Gareth Stewart	Host/Main	Host/Main		

=== Previous format ===
==== Instant restaurant round ====
Grouped into two, the teams initially are to compete in an instant restaurant round. Each episode focuses on one team's day of cooking, setting up their instant restaurant and serving a three-course dinner—entrée, main, and dessert—for the judges and their opposing teams. Teams could only start cooking three hours before the other teams and judges arrive at their house. After the team served all three meals to the judges and their opposition, each opposing team must rate the total meal out of ten, then each main judge must rate each of the three courses separately out of ten. The lowest scoring team will be then at risk of elimination.

Contestants do not necessarily cook in their own homes. In most cases when this happened it is the home of a family member or friend or a holiday home of one or both members of the team.

Team progress and eliminations:

There were variations on format in team progress and elimination process in this round.

- During the first series of the show, the lowest scoring teams (fifth place) of each instant restaurant round were eliminated immediately from the competition. Meanwhile, top two scoring teams on both rounds advanced through to quarterfinals round. Teams placing third and fourth on both instant restaurant rounds have to compete in a Kitchen Cook-off, where two losing teams will be eliminated, and the other two will proceed through to quarterfinals.

==== Pre-finals round ====
After the instant restaurant, the remaining teams compete in a four-round format and went from People's Choice directly to Sudden Death.

- People's Choice Challenge – During this offsite challenge, teams would all have an hour and a half to prepare their dish relevant to a theme or event. The team with the most number of guest votes (sometimes, the best-selling dish if all are tasked to sell their meal) is declared as the People's Choice and will be safe for the rest of the round (For series 5, some winning teams were given an advantage for the next Food truck challenge as an even number of teams were required to compete). A team with the worst dish will be chosen by the judges and will proceed straight through the Sudden Death round.
- Rapid Cook-off – In Kitchen Headquarters, teams are challenged to create a dish using a key ingredient in 30 minutes. All teams will be reviewed by the judges with certain number of teams who will be safe from elimination, and who will be competing in a following showdown.
- Showdown – Teams with the worst dishes during rapid cook-off compete in this round by cooking a meal using a core ingredient in 60 minutes. A team with the worst dish, again, will be chosen by the judges and will proceed straight through the Sudden Death round.
- Sudden Death – Two losing teams from People's Choice Challenge and Showdown will battle it out producing a three-course meal for Pete and Manu, as well as for the four guest judges. Both teams must prepare their dishes for a total of three hours—90 minutes prior to serving entrée, 60 minutes for main course, and 30 minutes for the dessert. Each judge will score the total meal out of ten and the lowest scoring team will be eliminated from the competition. As of the fourth series, blind tastings were introduced and the guest judges will critique the dish without the knowledge who cooked it.

==== Finals round ====
Finals round consists of three rounds: two sets of semifinals, and a grand final. All follow a sudden death cook-off format where in teams will produce a three-course meal for the main judges and for the four guest judges. Teams will be scored their total meal out of ten by the judges and the lower scoring team will be eliminated.

===== Semifinals =====
Prior to grand final round, four remaining teams compete in a semifinal round. Teams going head-to-head in this round is determined variously in different series. The final four were divided into two semifinal match-ups based on their rankings in the Final 5 round. Like last time, #1 cooked against #4, and #2 cooked against #3.

===== Grand final =====
Winners of each semifinal will go straight through the grand final round, the last stage of the competition. Each team will be scored and the higher scoring team will be declared the My Kitchen Rules champions.

==== Series 3 Format Change ====
For Series 3, airing in 2017, a significant change was made to the format, in which the Kitchen HQ rounds were dropped. After the initial instant restaurant round, one team was eliminated. A series of sudden death rounds follow.

== Series overview ==
To date, three series have been broadcast, as summarised below.

Colour legend:
– Winner
– Runner-up

Series	Premiere date	Finale date	Number of teams	Competing teams					Host & Main Judges	Guest Judges
One	24 August 2014	29 October 2014	13	AUK	Josh & Aaron	Sam & Dan	Tracey & Niel		Ben Bayly; Gareth Stewart	Nadia Lim; Grace Ramirez; Robert Oliver; Sean Connolly
One	24 August 2014	29 October 2014	13	BOP	June & Steph				Ben Bayly; Gareth Stewart	Nadia Lim; Grace Ramirez; Robert Oliver; Sean Connolly
One	24 August 2014	29 October 2014	13	CAN	Jessie & Ricki	Theresa & Joelle			Ben Bayly; Gareth Stewart	Nadia Lim; Grace Ramirez; Robert Oliver; Sean Connolly
One	24 August 2014	29 October 2014	13	HKB	Kelly & Megan				Ben Bayly; Gareth Stewart	Nadia Lim; Grace Ramirez; Robert Oliver; Sean Connolly
One	24 August 2014	29 October 2014	13	MWT	Aaron & Heather				Ben Bayly; Gareth Stewart	Nadia Lim; Grace Ramirez; Robert Oliver; Sean Connolly
One	24 August 2014	29 October 2014	13	OTA	Dan & Christie				Ben Bayly; Gareth Stewart	Nadia Lim; Grace Ramirez; Robert Oliver; Sean Connolly
One	24 August 2014	29 October 2014	13	WKO	Neena & Belinda				Ben Bayly; Gareth Stewart	Nadia Lim; Grace Ramirez; Robert Oliver; Sean Connolly
One	24 August 2014	29 October 2014	13	WGN	Ian & Sandle	Dal & Dai	Steve & Maura		Ben Bayly; Gareth Stewart	Nadia Lim; Grace Ramirez; Robert Oliver; Sean Connolly
Two	12 October 2015	15 December 2015	12	AUK	Hannah & Cathy	Katarina & Natasha	William & Zoe	Ben & Regan	Ben Bayly; Gareth Stewart	Nadia Lim; Grace Ramirez; Robert Oliver; Liz Egan
Two	12 October 2015	15 December 2015	12	CAN	Ruth & Cheryl				Ben Bayly; Gareth Stewart	Nadia Lim; Grace Ramirez; Robert Oliver; Liz Egan
Two	12 October 2015	15 December 2015	12	HKB	Monique & Henry				Ben Bayly; Gareth Stewart	Nadia Lim; Grace Ramirez; Robert Oliver; Liz Egan
Two	12 October 2015	15 December 2015	12	MWT	Kimberly & Brooke	Lauren & Simon			Ben Bayly; Gareth Stewart	Nadia Lim; Grace Ramirez; Robert Oliver; Liz Egan
Two	12 October 2015	15 December 2015	12	OTA	Travis & Jeremy				Ben Bayly; Gareth Stewart	Nadia Lim; Grace Ramirez; Robert Oliver; Liz Egan
Two	12 October 2015	15 December 2015	12	TKI	Laurance & Paul				Ben Bayly; Gareth Stewart	Nadia Lim; Grace Ramirez; Robert Oliver; Liz Egan
Two	12 October 2015	15 December 2015	12	WKO	Jay & Sarah				Ben Bayly; Gareth Stewart	Nadia Lim; Grace Ramirez; Robert Oliver; Liz Egan
Two	12 October 2015	15 December 2015	12	WGN	Jess & Stella				Ben Bayly; Gareth Stewart	Nadia Lim; Grace Ramirez; Robert Oliver; Liz Egan
Three	25 September 2017	27 November 2017	6	AUK	Jaryd & Ben	Charlotte & Maddie			Manu Feildel; Pete Evans	Nadia Lim; Sean Connolly; Ray McVinnie; Tom Hishon
Three	25 September 2017	27 November 2017	6	ROT	Tash & Hera				Manu Feildel; Pete Evans	Nadia Lim; Sean Connolly; Ray McVinnie; Tom Hishon
Three	25 September 2017	27 November 2017	6	WKA	Chris & Bex				Manu Feildel; Pete Evans	Nadia Lim; Sean Connolly; Ray McVinnie; Tom Hishon
Three	25 September 2017	27 November 2017	6	CHC	Heather & Mitch				Manu Feildel; Pete Evans	Nadia Lim; Sean Connolly; Ray McVinnie; Tom Hishon
Three	25 September 2017	27 November 2017	6	WGN	Teal & Sophie				Manu Feildel; Pete Evans	Nadia Lim; Sean Connolly; Ray McVinnie; Tom Hishon

== International broadcast ==
Country	Network	Current broadcaster?	Source(s)
Australia	Channel Seven	Yes	
Canada	Gusto TV	Yes	
United Kingdom	Sky Living	Yes	
