= My Kitchen Rules NZ series 3 =

My Kitchen Rules NZ
- Series 3
- No. of episodes: 10

Release
- Original network: TVNZ 2
- Original release: 25 September – 27 November 2017

Series chronology
- ← Previous; Series 2 (2015) Next → Series 4 (2018)

My Kitchen Rules NZ series 3 is a reality television cooking programme which aired on TVNZ 2.

It premiered September 25, with new hosts and judges, Pete Evans and Manu Feildel. Unlike previous seasons, and specific only to the NZ edition, only 6 teams went head-to-head in a single round instant restaurants (and no second round of double dish for each course), before competing in a series of elimination challenges, shortening the season by half.

== Format Changes ==
- Teams – Only 6 teams were involved in the competition. In the past, at least 12 teams have competed in the competition.
- Special Guest Judges – Special celebrity guest judges have appeared alongside the main judging panel and competing teams for the Sudden Death Cook-offs.

== Teams ==
Region		Members	Relationship	Status
Wanaka	WKA	Chris & Bex Wright	Wanaka Newlyweds	Winners 27 November 2017 (Round 5 - Grand Final)
Christchurch	CHC	Heather Andersen & Mitch MacDonald	Christchurch Foodie Friends	Runners-up 27 November 2017 (Round 5 - Grand Final)
Wellington	WGN	Teal & Sophie Mau	Wellington Hairdressers	Eliminated 20 November 2017 (Round 4 - Semi-Final)
Auckland	AUK	Jaryd Gray & Ben Cliffe	Auckland Childhood Mates	Eliminated 13 November 2017 (Round 3 - Sudden death)
Rotorua	ROT	Tash Whitewood & Hera Waitai	Rotorua Soulmates	Eliminated 6 November 2017 (Round 2 - Sudden death)
Auckland	AUK	Charlotte Brown & Maddie Hunt	Auckland Students	Eliminated 30 October 2017 (Round 1 - Instant restaurant)

== Elimination History ==
Teams' Competition Progress
Round:	1	2	3	4	5
Round:	Instant Restaurants	Sudden Death		Semi-Final	Grand Final
Teams:	Progress				
Chris & Bex	3rd (70)	SD (76)	—N/a	1st= (18)	Winners (52)
Heather & Mitch	2nd (75)	—N/a	SD (61)	1st= (18)	Runners-up (47)
Teal & Sophie	1st (77)	Immune		2nd (14)	Eliminated (Episode 9)
Jaryd & Ben	5th (56)	—N/a	SD (43)	Eliminated (Episode 8)	
Tash & Hera	4th (67)	SD (74)	Eliminated (Episode 7)		
Charlotte & Maddie	6th (54)	Eliminated (Episode 6)			

Cell descriptions
	Team won the challenge or received the highest score for the round.
Safe	Team became safe from elimination after winning/passing the challenge.
SD	Team won the Sudden Death cook-off and is safe from elimination.
SD	Team was eliminated after losing the Sudden Death cook-off or round.
Immune	From winning the previous challenge, team was immune from elimination and was not required to participate.
—N/a	Results do not apply as the team was not allocated to this challenge or round.

== Competition Details ==
=== Instant Restaurants ===
- Episodes 1 to 6
- Airdate – 25 Sept to 30 Oct 2017
- Description – Teams were to transform their homes into an 'Instant Restaurant', serving opposing teams and judges a three course meal (Entrée, Main and Dessert). All teams are judged and scored by the other teams, and also by Pete and Manu.

Instant Restaurant Summary
Instant Restaurant Round
Team and Episode Details		Guest scores						Pete's Scores			Manu's Scores			Total (out of 110)	Rank	Result
Team and Episode Details		T&H	J&B	T&S	C&M	C&B	H&M	Entrée	Main	Dessert	Entrée	Main	Dessert	Total (out of 110)	Rank	Result
ROT	Tash & Hera	-	7	6	7	7	5	7	9	2	6	9	3	67	4th	Safe
Ep 1	25 September 2017	Makue														Safe
Dishes	Entrée	Paua														Safe
Dishes	Main	Seared Lamb Rack on Smoky Kumara Puree with Spiced Dukkah and an Apple & Onion Marmalade														Safe
Dishes	Dessert	Mini Pavs with Kiwi Kawakawa Cream														Safe
AUK	Jaryd & Ben	3	-	6	6	4	6	5	6	5	5	5	5	56	5th	Safe
Ep 2	2 October 2017	Manhattan 661														Safe
Dishes	Entrée	Beet Cured Salmon with Pickled Cucumber and Herbs														Safe
Dishes	Main	Fillet of Beef with Cherry Salsa and Seasonal Vegetables														Safe
Dishes	Dessert	Chocolate Brownie with Homemade Coconut Ice Cream and Tempered Chocolate														Safe
WGN	Teal & Sophie	5	7	-	7	7	7	8	4	10	8	5	9	77	1st	Through to Semi-Final
Ep 3	9 October 2017	Saigon Salon														Through to Semi-Final
Dishes	Entrée	Banh Xeo (Vietnamese Pancake)														Through to Semi-Final
Dishes	Main	Beef Pho														Through to Semi-Final
Dishes	Dessert	Tapioca Delight with Cassava and Banana														Through to Semi-Final
AUK	Charlotte & Maddie	4	5	5	-	6	6	3	4	7	3	5	6	54	6th	Eliminated
Ep 4	16 October 2017	Fresh														Eliminated
Dishes	Entrée	Coconut Shrimp with Mango Chilli Dressing														Eliminated
Dishes	Main	Macadamia Crusted Snapper with Crab Stuffing, Coconut Rice and Broccoli														Eliminated
Dishes	Dessert	Green Tea Panna Cotta with Bacon Crumb, Chocolate Dirt, Raspberry Coulis & Pineapple Sauce														Eliminated
WKA	Chris & Bex	6	7	4	3	-	5	10	3	9	10	4	9	70	3rd	Safe
Ep 5	23 October 2017	Aspiring Fare														Safe
Dishes	Entrée	Chicken Liver Parfait with Caramelised Onions and Beer Bread														Safe
Dishes	Main	Lamb Ragu with Kumara Gnocchi and a Fig & Aubergine Salad														Safe
Dishes	Dessert	Plum & Almond Tart with Cardrona Rose Rabbit Ice Cream														Safe
CHC	Heather & Mitch	8	8	4	5	7	-	8	10	4	7	9	5	75	2nd	Safe
Ep 6	30 October 2017	Smoke & Mirrors														Safe
Dishes	Entrée	Pork Three Ways Pickled Pork Tongue, Cider Braised Pig Cheek and Crispy Tail														Safe
Dishes	Main	Wild Venison with Manuka Smoked Beets, Broccolini & Jus														Safe
Dishes	Dessert	Bomb Alaska with Vanilla Berry Compote														Safe

=== Sudden Death ===
==== Sudden Death Cook-off 1 ====
- Episode 7
- Airdate – 6 Nov 2017
- Description – CB: Chris & Bex (WKA) VS (ROT) TH: Tash & Hera. Cooking simultaneously in the same commercial kitchen, they are to prepare a multi-course meal to the judges, remaining contestants and special guests: Present and former cast members of Shortland Street, with the losing team to be eliminated on the spot.

Sudden Death Cook-Off results
Sudden Death Cook-Off 1
Team		Guests' scores		Judges' scores						Total (out of 100)	Result
Team		Shortland Street cast	Guest Teams	Pete			Manu			Total (out of 100)	Result
ROT	TH: Tash & Hera	8	23	7	7	7	7	8	7	74	Eliminated
Dishes	Entrée	Sandy's Parengarenga; Crayfish Tails, Coriander, Garlic Butter with Sisters Secret Sauce and Tempura Karengo Tio (Seaweed Oysters)								74	Eliminated
Dishes	Main	Mum's Muriz Kai Snapper with Crispy Skin on Risotto								74	Eliminated
Dishes	Dessert	Bangin Mangan; Manuka Honey Herb Poached Pears with Crumb and Vanilla Mascarpone								74	Eliminated
WKA	CB: Chris & Bex	8	19	8	8	8	9	8	8	76	Safe (Through to Semi-Final)
Dishes	Entrée	Rabbit Roulade with Spicy Sausage, Pancetta, Cauliflower Puree, Carrot Chips and Pumpkin Sauce with Sweet Spices								76	Safe (Through to Semi-Final)
Dishes	Main	Aged Beef with Roasted Garlic Chips, Bone Marrow Sauce, Fondant Potatoes and Pea Puree								76	Safe (Through to Semi-Final)
Dishes	Dessert	Chocolate & Peanut Butter Mousse with Salted Peanut Honeycomb								76	Safe (Through to Semi-Final)

==== Sudden Death Cook-off 2 ====
- Episode 8
- Airdate – 13 Nov 2017
- Description – JB: Jaryd & Ben (AUK) VS (CHC) HM: Heather & Mitch. They are to prepare a multi-course meal to the judges, remaining contestants and special guests: New Zealand sports stars, with the losing team to be eliminated on the spot.

Sudden Death Cook-Off results
Sudden Death Cook-Off 2
Team		Guests' scores		Judges' scores						Total (out of 90)	Result
Team		Sporting Elites	Guest Teams	Pete			Manu			Total (out of 90)	Result
AUK	JB: Jaryd & Ben	5	12	5	5	3	5	5	3	43	Eliminated
Dishes	Entrée	Tuna Steak Ceviche								43	Eliminated
Dishes	Main	Roast Duck Breast with Gorgonzola Mousse & Seasonal Veges								43	Eliminated
Dishes	Dessert	Fable Berry Trifle with Coconut Sponge								43	Eliminated
CHC	HM: Heather & Mitch	8	13	6	7	7	7	7	6	61	Safe (Through to Semi-Final)
Dishes	Entrée	Crayfish Trifle								61	Safe (Through to Semi-Final)
Dishes	Main	Slowly Braised Beef Cheeks with Creamed Kumara Mash, Wilted Greens and Pancetta								61	Safe (Through to Semi-Final)
Dishes	Dessert	Dropped Lemon Meringue Pie with Curd Shards and Crumb								61	Safe (Through to Semi-Final)

=== Semi-final ===
- Episode 9
- Airdate – 20 Nov 2017
- Description – All three remaining teams compete. They are to prepare a three-course banquet in Orakei Bay to the judges, remaining contestants and 80 guests: Newly-weds and their families, with the losing team to be eliminated on the spot. The three courses are Canapé, Entrée and Main as the Dessert is provided by the bride's family, which includes the wedding cake.

Semi-Final Results
Semi-Final
Team		Judges' scores		Total (out of 20)	Result
Team		Pete	Manu	Total (out of 20)	Result
WKA	CB: Chris & Bex	9	9	18	Safe (Through to Grand Final)
Dishes	Canapé	Chorizo and Manchego Croquettes		18	Safe (Through to Grand Final)
Dishes	Entrée	Sous Vide Salmon Salad with Fennel, Apple & Beetroot with a Hazlenut & Sweet Bourbon Sauce		18	Safe (Through to Grand Final)
Dishes	Main	Confit Pork Belly with Asian Slaw & Red Cabbage Puree		18	Safe (Through to Grand Final)
CHC	HM: Heather & Mitch	9	9	18	Safe (Through to Grand Final)
Dishes	Canapé	Prosciutto & Porcini Arancini		18	Safe (Through to Grand Final)
Dishes	Entrée	Hapuka on Caprese Salad		18	Safe (Through to Grand Final)
Dishes	Main	Lamb Rack with Sumac Ricotta, Broad Beans & Peas		18	Safe (Through to Grand Final)
WGN	TS: Teal & Sophie	7	7	14	Eliminated
Dishes	Canapé	Lychee; Pickled Cucumber & Chinese Pork Sausage		14	Eliminated
Dishes	Entrée	Pan fried Scallops with Spring Onion Oil, Capers & Apple Asian Slaw		14	Eliminated
Dishes	Main	Lemongrass Beef Salad with Chinese Sausage, Fried Onions, Peanuts & Liquid Gold Dressing		14	Eliminated

=== Grand Final ===
- Episode 10
- Airdate – 27 Nov 2017
- Description – CB: Chris & Bex (WKA) VS (CHC) HM: Heather & Mitch. They are to prepare a four-course meal (Entrée, Fish Main, Meat Main and Dessert) in Gusto at The Grand to the judges, remaining contestants and special guests (totalling 20 guests):Luminaries of NZ Chefs and Food Critics, including Ray McVinnie, chef, gastronomy lecturer in AUT, and former judge of MasterChef NZ seasons 1-3, Nadia Lim, the winner of Master Chef NZ season 2, dietitian and founder of My Food Bag, Sean Connelly, the head chef of Gusto and The Grill, with the winning team being crowned My Kitchen Rules NZ 2017 champions.

Grand Final Results
Grand Final
Team		Judges' scores						Total (out of 60)	Result
Team		Sean	Nadia	Ray	Tom	Pete	Manu	Total (out of 60)	Result
WKA	CB: Chris & Bex	8	8	9	9	9	9	52	Winners
Dishes	Entrée	Duck, Walnut and Pickled Grape Salad						52	Winners
Dishes	Fish Main	Blue Cod, Butter Beans and Cauliflower						52	Winners
Dishes	Meat Main	Redemption Gnochhi with Oxtail Ragu						52	Winners
Dishes	Dessert	Rhubarb and Custard						52	Winners
CHC	HM: Heather & Mitch	8	7	8	8	8	8	47	Runners-up
Dishes	Entrée	Mussels and Saffron Soup						47	Runners-up
Dishes	Fish Main	John Dory, Coconut and Cauliflower Curry						47	Runners-up
Dishes	Meat Main	Beef Fillet, Barley, Creamed Spinach and Onions						47	Runners-up
Dishes	Dessert	L&P Cheesecake, Passionfruit Cream and Hokey Pokey						47	Runners-up

== Episodes ==
Colour Key:
– Elimination Episode
– Finals Week

Round	Episode		Original airdate	Timeslot
1	1	Instant Restaurant Round: TH: Tash & Hera (ROT)	25 September 2017	Monday 8:00pm
1	2	Instant Restaurant Round: JB: Jaryd & Ben (AUK)	2 October 2017	Monday 7:30pm
1	3	Instant Restaurant Round: TS: Teal & Sophie (WGN)	9 October 2017	Monday 7:30pm
1	4	Instant Restaurant Round: CM: Charlotte & Maddie (AUK)	16 October 2017	Monday 7:30pm
1	5	Instant Restaurant Round: CB: Chris & Bex (WKA)	23 October 2017	Monday 7:30pm
1	6	Instant Restaurant Round: HM: Heather & Mitch (CHC)	30 October 2017	Monday 7:30pm
2	7	Sudden Death Round: CB: Chris & Bex (WKA) VS (ROT) TH: Tash & Hera	6 November 2017	Monday 7:30pm
2	8	Sudden Death Round: JB: Jaryd & Ben (AUK) VS (CHC) HM: Heather & Mitch	13 November 2017	Monday 7:30pm
3	9	Semi-final: CB: Chris & Bex (WKA) VS HM: Heather & Mitch (CHC) VS TS: Teal & Sophie (WGN)	20 November 2017	Monday 7:30pm
4	10	Grand Final: CB: Chris & Bex (WKA) VS (CHC) HM: Heather & Mitch	27 November 2017	Monday 7:30pm
