= My Kitchen Rules NZ series 2 =

My Kitchen Rules NZ
- Series 2
- No. of episodes: 20

Release
- Original network: TVNZ
- Original release: 12 October – 15 December 2015

Series chronology
- ← Previous; Series 1 (2014) Next → Series 3 (2017)

My Kitchen Rules NZ series 2 is a reality television cooking programme which airs on the TVNZ TV2.

For 2015, TVNZ switched My Kitchen Rules NZ from TV One to TV2 and in the revamped series duos will go head-to-head with teams from other regions around New Zealand. It premiered on 12 October 2015 and ended on 15 December 2015. The winning team, Jess and Stella, won the $100,000 prize money.

== Teams ==
Group	Team		Members	Relationship	Status
1	TKI	Taranaki	Laurance & Paul	Taranaki Mates	Eliminated on 26 October 2015 (Round 1 – Instant restaurant)
2	AUK	Auckland	Katarina & Natasha	Auckland Sisters	Eliminated on 10 November 2015 (Round 2 – Instant restaurant)
1	AUK	Auckland	Hannah & Cathy	Auckland Workmates	Eliminated on 16 November 2015 (People's Choice 1: BBQ Challenge)
2	MWT	Manawatu	Kimberley & Brooke	Manawatu Sisters	Eliminated on 23 November 2015 (Round 3 – Sudden Death)
3	AUK	Auckland	Ben & Regan	Auckland Mates	Eliminated on 23 November 2015 (Round 3 – Sudden Death)
1	OTA	Otago	Travis & Jeremy	Otago Mates	Eliminated on 1 December 2015 (Round 4 – Sudden Death)
2	MWT	Manawatu	Lauren & Simon	Palmerston North Friends	Eliminated on 1 December 2015 (Round 4 – Sudden Death)
1	CAN	Canterbury	Cheryl & Ruth	Canterbury Mother and Daughter	Eliminated on 7 December 2015 (Round 5 – Sudden Death)
1	HKB	Hawkes Bay	Monique & Henry	Hawkes Bay Couple	Eliminated on 8 December 2015 (Round 6 – Semi-Final 1)
2	WKO	Waikato	Jay & Sarah	Waikato Couple	Eliminated on 14 December 2015 (Round 6 – Semi-Final 2)
2	AUK	Auckland	William & Zoe	Auckland Friends	Runners-Up
3	WGN	Wellington	Jess & Stella	Wellington Besties	WINNERS

== Elimination history ==
Round:		1	2	3	4	5	6		7
Round:		Instant Restaurant		Sudden Death			Semi-Finals		Grand Final
Team		Result							
WGN	Jess & Stella	N/A		SD (40)	SD (53)	3rd	N/A	1st (47)	WINNERS (20)
AUK	William & Zoe	N/A	1st (80)	People's; Choice	SD (50)	4th	1st (54)	N/A	Runners-Up (16)
WKO	Jay & Sarah	N/A	3rd (50)	SD (38)	RCO (Safe)	2nd	N/A	2nd (40)	Eliminated (Episode 19)
HKB	Monique & Henry	2nd (72)	N/A	RCO (Safe)	People's; Choice	People's; Choice	2nd (42)	Eliminated (Episode 18)	
CAN	Cheryl & Ruth	4th (65)	N/A	RCO (Safe)	RCO (Safe)	5th	Eliminated (Episode 17)		
MWT	Lauren & Simon	N/A	2nd (71)	RCO (Safe)	SD (38)	Eliminated (Episode 16)			
OTA	Travis & Jeremy	3rd (66)	N/A	Immune	SD (30)	Eliminated (Episode 16)			
AUK	Ben & Regan	N/A		SD (39)	Eliminated (Episode 13)				
MWT	Kimberley & Brooke	N/A	4th (49)	SD (17)	Eliminated (Episode 13)				
AUK	Hannah & Cathy	1st (81)	N/A	LOW	Eliminated (Episode 11)				
AUK	Katarina & Natasha	N/A	5th (28)	Eliminated (Episode 10)					
TKI	Laurance & Paul	5th (64)	Eliminated (Episode 5)						

Cell descriptions
	Team won the challenge, People's Choice or received the highest score for the round.
	Team lost a challenge, cooked the weakest dish or received a low score and must compete in an additional round or challenge.
Safe	Team became safe from elimination after winning/passing the challenge.
SD	Team won the Sudden Death cook-off and is safe from elimination. Scores are out of 60.
SD	Team was eliminated after losing the Sudden Death cook-off or round. Scores are out of 60.
Immune	From winning the previous challenge, team was immune from elimination and was not required to participate.
—N/a	Results do not apply as the team was not allocated to this challenge or round.

== Competition details ==
=== Instant restaurant round ===
==== Round 1 ====
- Episodes 1 to 5
- Airdate – 12 to 26 Oct 2015
- Description – Teams were to transform their homes into an 'Instant Restaurant', serving opposing teams and judges a three course meal (Entree, Main and Dessert). All teams are judged and scored by the other teams, and also by Ben and Gareth.

Ep.	Team		Airdate	Guest scores					Ben's Scores			Gareth's Scores			Total (out of 100)	Rank	Result
Ep.	Team		Airdate	HC	LP	MH	CR	TJ	Entrée	Main	Dessert	Entrée	Main	Dessert	Total (out of 100)	Rank	Result
1	AUK	HC: Hannah & Cathy	12 October 2015	–	8	8	7	8	8	10	7	7	10	8	81	1st	Safe
2	TKI	LP: Laurance & Paul	13 October 2015	6	–	6	6	6	8	6	6	8	6	6	64	5th	Eliminated
3	HKB	MH: Monique & Henry	19 October 2015	6	6	–	7	8	9	8	6	9	7	6	72	2nd	Safe
4	CAN	CR: Cheryl & Ruth	20 October 2015	7	6	6	–	6	7	8	6	6	8	5	65	4th	Safe
5	OTA	TJ: Travis & Jeremy	26 October 2015	7	7	7	7	–	5	7	8	5	7	6	66	3rd	Safe

==== Round 2 ====
- Episodes 6 to 10
- Airdate – 27 Oct to 10 November 2015
- Description – Teams were to transform their homes into an 'Instant Restaurant', serving opposing teams and judges a three course meal (Entree, Main and Dessert). All teams are judged and scored by the other teams, and also by Ben and Gareth.

Ep.	Team		Airdate	Guest scores					Ben			Gareth			Total (out of 100)	Rank	Result
Ep.	Team		Airdate	JS	LS	WZ	KB	KN	Entrée	Main	Dessert	Entrée	Main	Dessert	Total (out of 100)	Rank	Result
6	WKO	JS: Jay & Sarah	27 October 2015	–	7	6	7	7	8	7	7	7	7	6	69	3rd	Safe
7	MWT	LS: Lauren & Simon	2 November 2015	7	–	7	7	6	10	5	7	9	5	8	71	2nd	Safe
8	AUK	WZ: William & Zoe	3 November 2015	7	8	–	7	8	10	6	9	9	6	10	80	1st	Safe
9	MWT	KB: Kimberley & Brooke	9 November 2015	5	6	5	–	5	6	6	9	6	7	9	64	4th	Safe
10	AUK	KN: Katrina & Natasha	10 November 2015	6	6	6	5	–	7	4	8	7	4	7	60	5th	Eliminated

=== Sudden death – Round 3 ===
==== People's choice 1: Oxfam BBQ challenge ====
- Episode 11
- Airdate – 16 November 2015
- Description – Two teams of gatecrashers join – Ben & Reagan and Jess & Stella. The teams head into the first challenge to serve a dish. The crowd will vote by donating for their favourite dish and the 2 teams who raise the most donations will receive People's Choice, sending both teams safe from Rapid Cook-Off and Showdown. Judges Ben and Gareth eliminate the weakest team and sent the second weakest team directly into the first Sudden Death Cook-Off. All other surviving teams are through to next showdown.

People's Choice
Team		Dish		Result
AUK	HC: Hannah & Cathy	BOLITAS DE QUESO with Creme Fraiche, Yogurt and Lemon Zest		LOW: Eliminated
HKB	MH: Monique & Henry	SWEET & SAVOURY PANCAKES with Creme Fraiche, Banana and Bacon OR with Horseradish Cream and Smoked Salmon		IN: Through to Rapid Cook-off
CAN	CR: Cheryl & Ruth	TURKISH LAMB WRAPS with Yoghurt Garlic Sauce and Tomato Mint Sauce		IN: Through to Rapid Cook-off
OTA	TJ: Travis & Jeremy	LAMB KOFTA with Greek Dressing		HIGH: Top 2. Immune.
WKO	JS: Jay & Sarah	SALMON WRAPPED IN BACON with Beetroot Chutney and Green Salad		IN: Through to Rapid Cook-off
MWT	LS: Lauren & Simon	ASIAN STICKY MEATBALLS with Apple Slaw		IN: Through to Rapid Cook-off
AUK	WZ: William & Zoe	FRENCH TOAST with Caramel Apples, Berry Compote and Vanilla Mascarpone		WIN: People's Choice. Immune.
MWT	KB: Kimberley & Brooke	COURGETTE AND FETA FRITTERS with Tomato Chutney	COTTAGE CHEESE CAKES with Berry Compote and Honey Vanilla Syrup	IN: Through to Rapid Cook-off
AUK	BR: Ben & Reagan	BARBEQUE PORK BUNS with Hoisin Satay Sauce and Apple Slaw		LOW: Through to Sudden Death
WGN	JS: Jess & Stella	GRILLED LAMB KOFTA with Flatbread and Tzatziki		IN: Through to Rapid Cook-off

==== Rapid cook-off ====
===== 45min magic box challenge by Nosh =====
- Episode 12
- Airdate – 17 November 2015
- Description – Each box consist of a protein and two complementary ingredients. All teams are required to use all the ingredients in the box and make the protein the star of the dish.

===== Showdown – Catch of the day (Battle of the fishes) =====
- Description – The teams are paired with the catch of the day, Gurnard or Trevally. The team which produces the best Gurnard and Trevally Dish will be safe from Sudden Death. The losing teams will compete in the Double Elimination Sudden Death.

RAPID COOK-OFF – Magic Box Challenge				SHOWDOWN – Catch of the day	
Team		Dish	Result	Dish	Result
HKB	MH: Monique & Henry	Turkey and Bacon Meatballs with Peanut and Coconut Cream Sauce	IN: Through to Showdown	Gurnard Fish & Chips with Chargrilled Zucchini and Tomato Salsa	SAFE: Winners
CAN	CR: Cheryl & Ruth	Salt-Baked Beef Fillet with Celeriac Remoulade	SAFE: Winners	N/A (Immune)	
OTA	TJ: Travis & Jeremy	N/A (Immune)			
WKO	JS: Jay & Sarah	Venison Pie with Roast Broccoli and Cherry Chutney	LOW: Through to Sudden Death	N/A (Through to Sudden Death)	
MWT	LS: Lauren & Simon	Seared Lamb with Parsnip Puree, Beetroot and Feta Salad	IN: Through to Showdown	Oven-Baked Trevally with Creamy Leeks, Roast Potatoes and Tomato Sauce	SAFE: Winners
AUK	WZ: William & Zoe	N/A (Immune)			
MWT	KB: Kimberley & Brooke	Pan-fried Salmon with Poached Fennel and Horseradish Broth	IN: Through to Showdown	Asian-Style Trevally with Coconut Rice and Stir-Fried Vegetables	LOW: Through to Sudden Death
AUK	BR: Ben & Reagan	N/A (Through to Sudden Death)			
WGN	JS: Jess & Stella	Pan-Seared Duck Breast with Baby Carrots and Cauliflower Puree	IN: Through to Showdown	Pan-Fried Gurnard with Salsa Verde, Roast Beans and Crispy Potatoes	LOW: Through to Sudden Death

==== Sudden death ====
- Episode 13
- Airdate – 23 November 2015
- Description – In a double elimination, the teams compete in the first sudden death cook-off.

Sudden Death Cook-Off results
Team		Judges' scores						Total (out of 60)	Result
Team		Nadia	Grace	Robert	Liz	Ben	Gareth	Total (out of 60)	Result
WKO	JS: Jay & Sarah	6	6	7	6	7	6	38	SAFE
Dishes	Entree	Scallops with Pesto Zucchini						38	SAFE
Dishes	Main	Herb-Crusted Lamb Rack with Vegetables						38	SAFE
Dishes	Dessert	Choc Berry Todu Cheesecake with Hokey Pokey Crumb Biscuits Base						38	SAFE
MWT	KB: Kimberley & Brooke	6	4	6	5	6	6	33	Eliminated
Dishes	Entree	Rotollo of Silverbeet and Ricotta with Red Capsicum Sauce						33	Eliminated
Dishes	Main	Scotch Fillet with Mushroom Sauce, Parsnip Puree, Carrots and Brussels Sprouts						33	Eliminated
Dishes	Dessert	Lemon Meringue Tart with Citrus-Scented Cream						33	Eliminated
AUK	BR: Ben & Reagan	6	5	6	5	7	6	35	Eliminated
Dishes	Entree	Whisky Chicken Livers with Raw Beetroot Salad						35	Eliminated
Dishes	Main	Crusted Lamb Rack with Polenta Chips, Pea Puree and Red Pepper Sauce						35	Eliminated
Dishes	Dessert	Dropped Choc Top with Mandarin Basil Ice Cream and Honey Rosemary Tuile Cone						35	Eliminated
WGN	JS: Jess & Stella	7	6	7	6	7	7	40	SAFE
Dishes	Entree	Butternut Ravioli with Burnt Butter and Sage Sauce						40	SAFE
Dishes	Main	Venison with Pea Puree, Brussels Sprouts, Kumara and Potato Gratin						40	SAFE
Dishes	Dessert	Chocolate Fondant with Vanilla Bean Ice Cream						40	SAFE

=== Sudden death – Round 4 ===
==== People's choice 2: Training day challenge ====
- Episode 14
- Airdate – 24 November 2015
- Description – The teams headed into the Ponsonby Rugby Club field for their second challenge. The players will vote for their favourite dish and the team with the highest votes will receive People's Choice, sending the team safe from both the Rapid Cook-Off and Showdown. Judges Ben and Gareth send the weakest team directly into the second Sudden Death Cook-Off. All other surviving teams are through to next showdown.

People's Choice
Team		Juniors	Seniors	Result
HKB	MH: Monique & Henry	Spaghetti Bolognese	Puku Miti Pita Pocket with Marinated Steak and Salad	WIN: People's Choice. Immune.
CAN	CR: Cheryl & Ruth	Meatlover's Pizza	Lamp Chops with Israeli Couscous	IN: Through to Rapid Cook-off
OTA	TJ: Travis & Jeremy	Sticky Pork Fingers	Hunters Assaghai	IN: Through to Rapid Cook-off
WKO	JS: Jay & Sarah	Beef and Carrot Kebab with Teriyaki Sauce	Hearty Open Burger with Capsicum and Pineapple Relish	LOW: Through to Rapid Cook-off
MWT	LS: Lauren & Simon	Raw Energy Balls	Onion Bhaji with Mango Chutney	IN: Through to Rapid Cook-off
AUK	WZ: William & Zoe	Fish Fingers with Coleslaw and Aioli	Ultimate Steak Sandwich	IN: Through to Rapid Cook-off
WGN	JS: Jess & Stella	Satay Beef Kebab	Mushroom and Steak Sandwich	LOW: Through to Sudden Death

==== Kitchen cook off – TBD ====
- Episode 15
- Airdate – 30 November 2015
- Description – Meat eater and beer drinker paradise. Rapid cook off: teams must cook one Entree and one main, using their given cuts of beef and lamb. Bar snack: teams must cook one bar snack dish and twin this with a choice of one of four beers.

RAPID COOK-OFF – Beef and Lamb				SHOWDOWN – Bar Snack	
Team		Dish	Result	Dish	Result
HKB	MH: Monique & Henry	N/A (Immune)			
CAN	CR: Cheryl & Ruth	Entree: Thai Beef Salad; Main: Japanese Lamb Curry	SAFE: Winners	N/A (Immune)	
OTA	TJ: Travis & Jeremy	Entree: Coffee-crusted blade steak Main: Pistachio-crusted lamb rack	IN: Through to Showdown	Mountain Goat Balls with Tomato Sauce	LOW: Through to Sudden Death
WKO	JS: Jay & Sarah	Entree: Sticky Lamb Chops; Main: Thai Beef Salad	IN: Through to Showdown	Herb-crusted Fish with Vegetable Chips & Aioli	SAFE: Winners
MWT	LS: Lauren & Simon	Entree: Lamb Dumplings; Main: Beef Pot Pie	IN: Through to Showdown	Chickpea Kebabs with Beetroot Raita	LOW: Through to Sudden Death
AUK	WZ: William & Zoe	Entree: Chilli Con Carne; Main: Lamb rump Pappardelle	LOW: Through to Sudden Death	N/A (Through to Sudden Death)	
WGN	JS: Jess & Stella	N/A (Through to Sudden Death)			

==== Sudden death ====
- Episode 16
- Airdate – 1 December 2015
- Description – In a second double elimination, the teams compete in the second sudden death cook-off.

Sudden Death Cook-Off results
Team		Judge's scores						Total (out of 60)	Result
Team		Nadia	Grace	Robert	Liz	Ben	Gareth	Total (out of 60)	Result
OTA	TJ: Travis & Jeremy	5	5	5	6	5	4	30	Eliminated
Dishes	Entree	Scallops with Seafood Broth						30	Eliminated
Dishes	Main	Beef and Mushroom with Mashed Potato & Onion						30	Eliminated
Dishes	Dessert	Cheeky Jaffa						30	Eliminated
MWT	LS: Lauren & Simon	7	6	6	6	7	6	38	Eliminated
Dishes	Entree	Spinach & Ricotta Ravioli with Sage Butter Sauce						38	Eliminated
Dishes	Main	Butter Duck with Basmati Rice						38	Eliminated
Dishes	Dessert	White Chocolate Mousse with Ginger Crumb, Meringue Shards & Passionfruit Gel						38	Eliminated
AUK	WZ: William & Zoe	8	8	9	9	8	8	50	SAFE
Dishes	Entree	Seared Tuna with Avocado Wasabi Puree & Sesame Dressing						50	SAFE
Dishes	Main	Lamb Backstrap with Smoky Eggplant & Pearl Barley						50	SAFE
Dishes	Dessert	Bombe Alaska						50	SAFE
WGN	JS: Jess & Stella	9	9	8	9	9	9	53	SAFE
Dishes	Entree	Kingfish Ceviche with Cucumber & Radish						53	SAFE
Dishes	Main	Spice-rubbed Beef Fillet with Parsnip & Beetroot						53	SAFE
Dishes	Dessert	Salted Caramel Pear Tart with Cinnamon Ice Cream						53	SAFE

=== Sudden death – Round 5 ===
==== People's choice 3: School meal challenge ====
- Episode 17
- Airdate – 7 December 2015
- Description – The top five teams cook a five-course degustation dinner for students and guests at Auckland's Pakuranga College. The lowest scoring team is eliminated as the remaining four teams are ranked into the semifinals. The Winners of the challenge are paired with the fourth placed team for the first Semi-final cook-off while the remaining two teams will be competing in the second Semi-final.

People's Choice
Team		Dish	Result
HKB	MH: Monique & Henry	Spiced Pork Tenderloin with Potato Kumara Mash & Orange Cumin Sauce (1st Main)	WIN: People's Choice. 1st. Through to Semi-Final 1
CAN	CR: Cheryl & Ruth	Lamb Rump with Fennel Puree, Caramelised Shallots & Shiraz Syrup (2nd Main)	Eliminated
WKO	JS: Jay & Sarah	Tuna Tapawha with Fennel Slaw, Mushroom Emulsion & Kumara Crisps (2nd Entree)	IN: Safe. 2nd. Through to Semi-Final 2
AUK	WZ: William & Zoe	Steak Tartare with Matchstick Chips & Virgin Bloody Mary Gel (1st Entree)	IN: Safe. 4th. Through to Semi-Final 1
WGN	JS: Jess & Stella	Textures of Chocolate & Raspberry (Dessert)	IN: Safe. 3rd. Through to Semi-Final 2

=== Semi-finals ===
==== Semi-final 1 ====
- Episode 18
- Airdate – 8 December 2015
- Description – 2 Teams in the first Semi-Final Cook-Off. The lower scoring team is eliminated and the winner proceeds through to the Grand Final.

Semi-Final Cook-Off Results
Team		Judge's scores						Total (out of 60)	Result
Team		Nadia	Grace	Robert	Liz	Ben	Gareth	Total (out of 60)	Result
HKB	MH: Monique & Henry	7	7	7	7	7	7	42	Eliminated
Dishes	Entree	Seared Scallops in Pumpkin Soup						42	Eliminated
Dishes	Main	Beef Eye Fillet with Māori Potato Puree, Caramelised Sweetbreads, Madeira Sauce and Pikopiko						42	Eliminated
Dishes	Dessert	Crème Brûlée with Caramelised Apple						42	Eliminated
AUK	WZ: William & Zoe	9	9	9	9	9	9	54	IN: Through to Grand Final
Dishes	Entree	Beetroot and Goat's Cheese Lasagnette						54	IN: Through to Grand Final
Dishes	Main	Belly Pork, Parsnip and Rhubarb						54	IN: Through to Grand Final
Dishes	Dessert	Salted Caramel Tart with Ginger Ice Cream and Macadamia Brittle						54	IN: Through to Grand Final

==== Semi-final 2 ====
- Episode 19
- Airdate – 14 December 2015
- Description – 2 Teams in the second semi-final cook-off. The lower scoring team is eliminated and the other team becomes the second team to proceed into the grand final.

Semi-Final Cook-Off Results
Team		Judge's scores						Total (out of 60)	Result
Team		Nadia	Grace	Robert	Liz	Ben	Gareth	Total (out of 60)	Result
WKO	JS: Jay & Sarah	7	6	7	7	7	6	40	Eliminated
Dishes	Entree	Plum-Cured Salmon						40	Eliminated
Dishes	Main	Duck Breast with Truffle Cauliflower Mash, Spinach and Stuffing Crumb						40	Eliminated
Dishes	Dessert	Brandy Snap with White Chocolate and Lime Parfait						40	Eliminated
WGN	JS: Jess & Stella	8	8	8	7	8	8	47	IN: Through to Grand Final
Dishes	Entree	Beef Carpaccio						47	IN: Through to Grand Final
Dishes	Main	Lamb Loin with Carrot, Onion and Peas						47	IN: Through to Grand Final
Dishes	Dessert	Doughnuts with White Chocolate Mousse and Blueberry Ice Cream						47	IN: Through to Grand Final

=== Grand-finals ===
- Episode 20
- Airdate – 15 December 2015
- Description – In the final cook-off for the series, the top two teams face-off in the ultimate grand final. Teams each cook a five course degustation in the format of a cold entree, hot entree, seafood main, meat main and dessert. 20 plates of each course, totalling 100 plates per team were served to all eliminated teams, friends and family. Guest judges returned for the final verdict of awarding the $100,000 prize to the winners. Teams also wear chef attire and have their Instant Restaurant represented.

Grand Final Cook-Off Results
Team		Judge's scores						Total (out of 60)	Result
Team		Nadia	Grace	Robert	Liz	Ben	Gareth	Total (out of 60)	Result
AUK	WZ: William & Zoe	10	9	9	9	8	8	53	Runners-up
Dishes		POINT						53	Runners-up
1st course – Cold Entree		Scallops and Watermelon						53	Runners-up
2nd course – Hot Entree		Duck and Carrot						53	Runners-up
3rd course – Seafood Main		Salmon and Cauliflower						53	Runners-up
4th course – Meat Main		Venison with Tomato Tarte Tatin						53	Runners-up
5th course – Dessert		Coffee, Caramel and Hazelnut Entremet						53	Runners-up
WGN	JS: Jess & Stella	9	10	9	9	9	9	55	WINNERS
Dishes		NOM						55	WINNERS
1st course – Cold Entree		Crayfish with Champagne, Elderflower and Mango						55	WINNERS
2nd course – Hot Entree		Paua Tortellini						55	WINNERS
3rd course – Seafood Main		Beef Cheeks with Horseradish Mash						55	WINNERS
4th course – Meat Main		Smoked-Rubber Venison with Fennel Puree, Watercress Emulsion and Radishes						55	WINNERS
5th course – Dessert		Saffron-Poached Pear with Dark Chocolate Mousse and Ginger Crumb						55	WINNERS

== Episodes ==
Round	Episode		Original airdate	Timeslot
1	1	Instant Restaurant Round: HC: Hannah & Cathy (AUK)	12 October 2015	Monday 7:30pm
1	2	Instant Restaurant Round: LP: Laurance & Paul (TKI)	13 October 2015	Tuesday 7:30pm
1	3	Instant Restaurant Round: MH: Monique & Henry (HKB)	19 October 2015	Monday 7:30pm
1	4	Instant Restaurant Round: CR: Cheryl & Ruth (CAN)	20 October 2015	Tuesday 7:30pm
1	5	Instant Restaurant Round: TJ: Travis & Jeremy (OTA)	26 October 2015	Monday 7:30pm
2	6	Instant Restaurant Round: JS: Jay & Sarah (WKO)	27 October 2015	Tuesday 7:30pm
2	7	Instant Restaurant Round: LS: Lauren & Simon (MWT)	2 November 2015	Monday 7:30pm
2	8	Instant Restaurant Round: WZ: William & Zoe (AUK)	3 November 2015	Tuesday 7:30pm
2	9	Instant Restaurant Round: KB: Kimberley & Brooke (MWT)	9 November 2015	Monday 7:30pm
2	10	Instant Restaurant Round: KN: Katrina & Natasha (AUK)	10 November 2015	Tuesday 7:30pm
3	11	People's Choice Challenge:	16 November 2015	Monday 7:30pm
3	12	Rapid Cook-Off & Showdown:	17 November 2015	Tuesday 7:30pm
3	13	Sudden Death:	23 November 2015	Monday 7:30pm
4	14	People's Choice Challenge:	24 November 2015	Tuesday 7:30pm
4	15	Rapid Cook-Off & Showdown:	30 November 2015	Monday 7:30pm
4	16	Sudden Death:	1 December 2015	Tuesday 7:30pm
5	17	People's Choice Challenge:	7 December 2015	Monday 7:30pm
6	18	Semi-Final 1: MH: Monique & Henry (HKB) VS (AUK) WZ: William & Zoe	8 December 2015	Tuesday 7:30pm
6	19	Semi-Final 2: JS: Jay & Sarah (WKO) VS (WGN) JS: Jess & Stella	14 December 2015	Monday 8:30pm
7	20	Grand Final: WZ: William & Zoe (AUK) VS (WGN) JS: Jess & Stella	15 December 2015	Tuesday 8:30pm
