= My Kitchen Rules NZ series 1 =

My Kitchen Rules NZ
- Series 1
- No. of episodes: 30

Release
- Original network: TVNZ
- Original release: 24 August – 28 October 2014

Series chronology
- Next → Series 2 (2015)

My Kitchen Rules NZ series 1 is a reality television cooking programme which aired on the TVNZ TV ONE.

== Teams ==
The teams in this episode were:

Region		Group	Teams	Relationship	Status
Bay of Plenty	BOP	1	June Taragonish & Steph Lison	Bogan Besties	Eliminated on 2 September 2014 (Round 1 - Instant restaurant)
Hawkes Bay	HKB	2	Kelly & Megan Tarahase	Hawkes Bay Sisters	Eliminated on 15 September 2014 (Round 2 - Instant restaurant)
Auckland	AUK	1	Tracey Allan & Neil Gussey	Beauty & The Beast	Eliminated on 21 September 2014 (Round 3 - Instant restaurant)
Canterbury	CAN	3	Theresa Haynery & Joelle Soga	Sporty Mums	Eliminated on 21 September 2014 (Round 3 - Instant restaurant)
Otago	OTA	1	Dan & Christie Beck	Newlyweds	Eliminated on 1 October 2014 (Round 4 - Sudden Death)
Auckland	AUK	1	Sam & Dan Freeman	Social Media Buddies	Eliminated on 8 October 2014 (Round 5 - Sudden Death)
Wellington	WGN	2	Ian Wright & Sandie Wright	Fireman & His Flame	Eliminated on 8 October 2014 (Round 5 - Sudden Death)
Wellington	WGN	3	Steve Goodman & Maura Rigby	Wellington Foodies	Eliminated on 15 October 2014 (Round 6 - Sudden Death)
Canterbury	CAN	2	Jessie Smulders & Ricki-mae Paisley	Christchurch Cuties	Eliminated on 22 October 2014 (Round 7 - Sudden Death)
Auckland	AUK	2	Josh King & Aaron Gascoigne	Corporate Dads	Eliminated on 26 October 2014 (Round 8 - Semi-Final 1)
Wellington	WGN	3	Dai Sano & Dal Chayo	Sugar & Spice	Eliminated on 28 October 2014 (Round 8 - Semi-Final 2)
Manawatu	MWT	2	Aaron Freeman & Heather Freeman	Polynesian Cooks	Runner-up
Waikato	WKO	1	Neena Truscott & Belinda MacDonald	Modern Day Hippies	Winners

== Elimination history ==
Round:		1	2	3	4	5	6	7	8		9
Round:		Instant Restaurants			Sudden Death				Semi-Finals		Final
Team		Result									
WKO	Neena & Belinda	1st (71)	—N/a	—N/a	RCO (Safe)	People's; Choice	People's; Choice	SD (53)	—N/a	1st (55)	WINNERS (52)
MWT	Aaron & Heather	—N/a	1st (75)	—N/a	RCO (Safe)	RCO (Safe)	RCO (Safe)	RCO (Safe)	1st (54)	—N/a	Runners-up (51)
WGN	Dai & Dal	—N/a	—N/a	1st (79)	People's; Choice	SD (51)	RCO (Safe)	RCO (Safe)	—N/a	2nd (47)	Eliminated (Episode 29)
AUK	Josh & Aaron	—N/a	4th (68)	2nd (73)	People's; Choice	RCO (Safe)	RCO (Safe)	People's; Choice	2nd (50)	Eliminated (Episode 28)	
CAN	Jessie & Ricki	—N/a	2nd (70)	—N/a	RCO (Safe)	RCO (Safe)	SD (44)	SD (43)	Eliminated (Episode 27)		
WGN	Steve & Maura	—N/a	—N/a	3rd (69)	People's; Choice	SD (44)	SD (43)	Eliminated (Episode 24)			
WGN	Ian & Sandle	—N/a	3rd (69)	—N/a	RCO (Safe)	SD (41)	Eliminated (Episode 21)				
AUK	Sam & Dan	3rd (63)	—N/a	—N/a	SD (42)	SD (12)	Eliminated (Episode 21)				
OTA	Dan & Christie	2nd (64)	—N/a	—N/a	SD (35)	Eliminated (Episode 18)					
CAN	Theresa & Joelle	—N/a	—N/a	4th (68)	Eliminated (Episode 15)						
AUK	Tracey & Neil	4th (57)	—N/a	5th (57)	Eliminated (Episode 15)						
HKB	Kelly & Megan	—N/a	5th (53)	Eliminated (Episode 10)							
BOP	June & Steph	5th (47)	Eliminated (Episode 5)								

Cell descriptions
	Team won the challenge, People's Choice or received the highest score for the round.
	Team lost a challenge, cooked the weakest dish or received a low score and must compete in an additional round or challenge.
Safe	Team became safe from elimination after winning/passing the challenge.
SD	Team won the Sudden Death cook-off and is safe from elimination. Scores are out of 60.
SD	Team was eliminated after losing the Sudden Death cook-off or round. Scores are out of 60.
Immune	From winning the previous challenge, team was immune from elimination and was not required to participate.
—N/a	Results do not apply as the team was not allocated to this challenge or round.

== Competition details ==
=== Instant Restaurant Round ===
==== Round 1 - Scores ====
- Episodes 1 to 5
- Airdate – 24 Aug to 2 Sep 2014
- Description – Teams were to transform their homes into an 'Instant Restaurant', serving opposing teams and judges a three course meal (Entree, Main and Dessert). All teams are judged and scored by the other teams, and also by Ben and Gareth.

Ep.	Team		Airdate	Guest scores					Ben's Scores			Gareth's Scores			Total (out of 100)	Rank	Result
Ep.	Team		Airdate	NB	SD	JS	DC	TN	Entrée	Main	Dessert	Entrée	Main	Dessert	Total (out of 100)	Rank	Result
1	WKO	NB: Neena & Belinda	24 Aug2014	-	6	7	7	7	9	6	7	8	7	7	71	1st	Safe
2	AUK	SD: Sam & Dan	26 Aug 2014	4	-	6	6	8	5	7	8	5	7	7	63	3rd	Safe
3	BOP	JS: June & Steph	27 Aug 2014	4	3	-	5	5	4	5	6	5	4	6	47	5th	Eliminated
4	OTA	DC: Dan & Christie	31 Aug 2014	5	6	5	-	6	5	8	9	5	7	8	64	2nd	Safe
5	AUK	TN: Tracey & Neil	2 Sep 2014	7	5	5	6	-	4	9	4	4	8	5	57	4th	Through to Round 3

==== Round 1 - Dishes ====
Team Restaurant Name		Entrée	Main	Dessert
WKO	NB: Neena & Belinda	Pan-Seared Hapuka with Pumpkin and Horopito Puree, Wild Blackberries and Kawakawa Crisps	Sticky Hawthorn Berry Venison with Turmeric and Chilli Roasties, Green Beans and Hazelnuts	White Chocolate & Kahikatea Tart with Honey Pine Nut Crust and Hahikatea berries
AUK	SD: Sam & Dan	Caramelised Onion & Mushroom Tortellini with Burnt Butter and Sage Sauce	Eye Fillet with Triple Cooked Pom Frits, Hollandaise Sauce, Green Salad & Red Wine Jus	Raspberry Brownie with Toasted Almonds, Maruka Honey Yoghurt, Minted Raspberry Sorbet & Milk Chocolate Ganache
BOP	JS: June & Steph	Roasted Red Pepper & Tomato Soup with Parmesan Fried Bread	Slow cooked Lamb Shanks with Garlic Potato Mash, Baby Carrots & Beans with a Red Wine & Plum Jus	Apple & Cinnamon Pie with Nutty Vanilla Ice Cream & Macadamia Liqueur Sauce
OTA	DC: Dan & Christie	Snapper Ceviche	Spicy Pork Belly with Polenta Chips & Chipotle Mayonnaise	Chili Chocolate Pie with Margarita Cream
AUK	TN: Tracey & Neil	Spicy Walnut Encrusted Snapper with Orange & Parsley Salad	Tahini & Soy Infused Slow Roasted Pork Belly with Potato Galette & Red Cabbage	White Chocolate Mountain with Thai Ginger Infused Raspberry Coulis & Coconut Shavings

==== Round 2 ====
- Episodes 6 to 10
- Airdate – 3 Sep to 14 Sep 2014
- Description – Teams were to transform their homes into an 'Instant Restaurant', serving opposing teams and judges a three course meal (Entree, Main and Dessert). All teams are judged and scored by the other teams, and also by Ben and Gareth.

Ep.	Team		Airdate	Guest scores					Ben			Gareth			Total (out of 100)	Rank	Result
Ep.	Team		Airdate	AH	IS	JR	JA	KM	Entrée	Main	Dessert	Entrée	Main	Dessert	Total (out of 100)	Rank	Result
6	MWT	AH: Aaron & Heather	3 Sep 2014	-	8	8	8	7	6	7	9	6	7	9	75	1st	Safe
7	WGN	IS: Ian & Sandie	7 Sep 2014	6	-	6	6	7	7	6	9	8	5	9	69	3rd	Safe
8	CAN	JR: Jessie & Ricki	8 Sep 2014	6	7	-	6	6	10	7	6	9	6	7	70	2nd	Safe
9	AUK	JA: Josh & Aaron	10 Sep 2014	7	7	7	-	6	9	8	4	8	8	4	68	4th	Through to Round 3
10	HKB	KM: Kelly & Megan	14 Sep 2014	4	5	4	3	-	9	6	4	10	4	4	53	5th	Eliminated

Round 2 - Dishes

Team Restaurant Name		Entrée	Main	Dessert
MWT	AH: Aaron & Heather	Trio of Ceviche with Kumara Chips	Beef Eye Fillet with Watercress, Cauliflower Purée, Carrots, Gaufritte and Red Wine Jus	Boca Loca Chocolate Mousse with Cacao and Chilli, Berry Coulis and Strawberries
MWT	Tatou	Trio of Ceviche with Kumara Chips	Beef Eye Fillet with Watercress, Cauliflower Purée, Carrots, Gaufritte and Red Wine Jus	Boca Loca Chocolate Mousse with Cacao and Chilli, Berry Coulis and Strawberries
WGN	IS: Ian & Sandie	Pan Seared Fish on Potato Fondant with Beurre Noisette	Gorgonzola, Mushroom and Walnut Risotto with Chorizo Crumb	Vanilla Panna Cotta
WGN	Ignite	Pan Seared Fish on Potato Fondant with Beurre Noisette	Gorgonzola, Mushroom and Walnut Risotto with Chorizo Crumb	Vanilla Panna Cotta
CAN	JR: Jessie & Rickie	Spinach, Ricotta and Pine Nut Ravioli	Salmon Fillet with Zesty Lime & Mango Couscous Salad	Baked Chocolate Pudding
CAN	Liaise	Spinach, Ricotta and Pine Nut Ravioli	Salmon Fillet with Zesty Lime & Mango Couscous Salad	Baked Chocolate Pudding
AUK	JA: Josh & Aaron	Sesame Seed Encrusted Seared Yellow Fin Tuna with Wasabi Mayo, Spiced Vinaigrette and a Rocket Bale	Free Range Breast of Chicken with a Moa Noir Reduction, Duchess Potatoes and Asparagus	Pear and Ginger Fruit Crumble with Homemade Kiwifruit and Manuka Honey Ice Cream
AUK	Two Fat Cats	Sesame Seed Encrusted Seared Yellow Fin Tuna with Wasabi Mayo, Spiced Vinaigrette and a Rocket Bale	Free Range Breast of Chicken with a Moa Noir Reduction, Duchess Potatoes and Asparagus	Pear and Ginger Fruit Crumble with Homemade Kiwifruit and Manuka Honey Ice Cream
HKB	KM: Kelly & Megan	Grilled Crayfish with Winter Salad	Herb-Rubbed Venison Loin with Cauliflower Purée and Tamarillo Sauce	Pumpkin Pie and a Salted Caramel Sauce
HKB	The Whole Bowl	Grilled Crayfish with Winter Salad	Herb-Rubbed Venison Loin with Cauliflower Purée and Tamarillo Sauce	Pumpkin Pie and a Salted Caramel Sauce

==== Round 3 ====
- Episodes 11 to 12
- Airdate – 16 Sep to 24 Sep 2014
- Description – Teams which placed fourth in the first two Instant Restaurant are joined by three Gatecrashers and had to transform their homes into an 'Instant Restaurant', serving opposing teams and judges a three course meal (Entree, Main and Dessert). All teams are judged and scored by the other teams, and also by Ben and Gareth. Two teams with the lowest score will be eliminated.

Ep.	Team		Airdate	Guest scores					Ben			Gareth			Total (out of 100)	Rank	Result
Ep.	Team		Airdate	TJ	TN	JA	SM	DD	Entrée	Main	Dessert	Entrée	Main	Dessert	Total (out of 100)	Rank	Result
11	CAN	TJ: Theresa & Joelle	16 Sep 2014	-	7	5	7	8	5	8	8	68	4th	Eliminated			
12	AUK	TN: Tracy & Neil	17 Sep 2014	6	-	5	5	5	6	5	8	6	5	6	57	5th	Eliminated
13	AUK	JA: Josh & Aaron	21 Sep 2014	8	7	-	8	7	9	6	7	9	6	6	73	2nd	Safe
14	WGN	SM: Steve & Maura	23 Sep 2014	8	5	7	-	7	9	5	7	9	5	7	69	3rd	Safe
15	WGN	DD: Dai & Dal	24 Sep 2014	7	9	7	9	-	8	10	6	7	10	6	79	1st	Safe

=== Sudden Death - Round 4 ===
==== People's Choice 1: Ronald McDonald House's Challenge ====
- Episodes 16
- Airdate – 28 Sep 2014
- Description – Competing in a group of three, teams headed into the first challenge to serve a dish. Families will vote by donating for their favourite dish and the group who received the most votes will receive People's Choice, sending them safe from Rapid Cook-Off and Showdown. Judges Ben and Gareth sent the weakest team directly into the first Sudden Death Cook-Off. All other surviving teams are through to the next showdown.

People's Choice
Group	Team		Dish	Result
1 (Black)	WKO	NB: Neena & Belinda	Wild Weed Spanakopita Side: Potato Stacks	IN: Through to Rapid Cook-off
1 (Black)	AUK	SD: Sam & Dan	Crispy-Fried Free-Range Chicken with Citrus Alioli	LOW: Through to Sudden Death
1 (Black)	OTA	DC: Dan & Christie	Black Bean Chocolate Brownie	IN: Through to Rapid Cook-off
2 (White)	MWT	AH: Aaron & Heather	Beef Shin Osso Bucco with Israeli Couscous Side: Potato Gratin	IN: Through to Rapid Cook-off
2 (White)	WGN	IS: Ian & Sandie	Vegetable Balti with Flatbreads and Raita	IN: Through to Rapid Cook-off
2 (White)	CAN	JR: Jessie & Ricki	White Chocolate Ambrosia Cheesecake with Shortbread	IN: Through to Rapid Cook-off
3 (Red)	AUK	JA: Josh & Aaron	Chicken Tenders with Asian Slaw	WIN: People's Choice. Immune.
3 (Red)	WGN	SM: Steve & Maura	Triple Chocolate Cheesecake	WIN: People's Choice. Immune.
3 (Red)	WGN	DD: Dai & Dal	Fried Noodles Side: Spring Rolls	WIN: People's Choice. Immune.

==== Rapid Cook-Off ====
===== 45min Mystery Challenge =====
- Episodes 12
- Airdate – 17 Nov 2015
- Description – Each team must cook a two course romantic date night meal in 45 minutes.

===== Showdown - Whole Chicken =====
- Description – Teams were given a whole chicken and option to debone it themselves. The losing team will compete in the Elimination Sudden Death.

RAPID COOK-OFF - Savory Sweet				SHOWDOWN - Whole Chicken	
Team		Dish	Result	Dish	Result
WKO	NB: Neena & Belinda	Pork Fillet with Potato Mash and Apple Cider Sage Sauce	SAFE: Winners	N/A (Immune)	
AUK	SD: Sam & Dan	N/A (Through to Sudden Death)			
OTA	DC: Dan & Christie	Minted Rack of Lamb with Smashed Peas and Root Vegetable Chips	IN: Through to Showdown	Chicken Kiev with Green Beans	LOW: Through to Sudden Death
MWT	AH: Aaron & Heather	Beef Carpaccio with White Bean Purée, Toast and Petit Salad	IN: Through to Showdown	Quarter Roast Chicken with Potato Mash, Brussels Sprouts and Pan Jus	SAFE: High
WGN	IS: Ian & Sandie	Asian-Spiced Fish with Coconut Rice and Sesame Beans	IN: Through to Showdown	Lemon & Thyme Chicken Breast with Kumara Rosti, Broccoli and Jus	SAFE: High
CAN	JR: Jessie & Ricki	Coffee Pancakes with Chocolate Sauce and Vanilla Mascarpone	IN: Through to Showdown	Chicken Breast with Mushroom Sauce, Kumara Smash and Beans	SAFE: Winners
AUK	JA: Josh & Aaron	N/A (Immune)			
WGN	SM: Steve & Maura	N/A (Immune)			
WGN	DD: Dai & Dal	N/A (Immune)			

==== Sudden Death ====
- Episodes 18
- Airdate – 1 Oct 2014
- Description – Teams compete in the first Sudden Death Cook-Off.

Sudden Death Cook-Off Results
Team		Judge's scores						Total (out of 60)	Result
Team		Nadia	Grace	Robert	Sean	Ben	Gareth	Total (out of 60)	Result
AUK	SD: Sam & Dan	7	7	7	6	8	7	42	SAFE
Dishes	Entree	Baked Crusted Hapuka with Pomme Purée and Beurre Blanc						42	SAFE
Dishes	Main	Pork Belly with Scallops, Chorizo, Apple Compote and Vanilla Syrup						42	SAFE
Dishes	Dessert	Deconstructed Lemon & Raspberry Meringue Pie						42	SAFE
OTA	DC: Dan & Christie	6	5	6	6	6	6	35	Eliminated
Dishes	Entree	Hoki Cakes with Tomato Sauce						35	Eliminated
Dishes	Main	Pork and Fennel Pasta						35	Eliminated
Dishes	Dessert	Chocolate Fondant with Lavender Cream						35	Eliminated

=== Sudden Death - Round 5 ===
==== People's Choice 2: International Market Day Challenge ====
- Episodes 19
- Airdate – 5 Oct 2014
- Description – Each team must tackle a different cuisine and try to impress 150 guests who will vote by donating for their favourite dish and the team who received the most money will receive People's Choice, sending them safe from Rapid Cook-Off and Showdown. Judges Ben and Gareth sent two of the weakest teams directly into the second Sudden Death Cook-Off. All other surviving teams are through to the next showdown.

People's Choice
Team		Dish	Result
WKO	NB: Neena & Belinda	INDIAN Tomato and Tamarind Fish Curry with Coconut Chutney and Indian Flatbread	WIN: People's Choice. Immune.
AUK	SD: Sam & Dan	THAILAND Thai Green Chicken Curry with Roti	LOW: Through to Rapid Cook-off
MWT	AH: Aaron & Heather	KIWI L&P Glazed Sticky Ribs with Marinated Mussels and Fried Bread	IN: Through to Rapid Cook-off
WGN	IS: Ian & Sandie	MEXICO Soft Shell Fish Tacos with Spicy Salsa	LOW: Through to Sudden Death
CAN	JR: Jessie & Ricki	ITALY Mushroom and Goat’s Cheese Arancini with Tomato and Basil Sauce	LOW: Through to Rapid Cook-off
AUK	JA: Josh & Aaron	PACIFIC ISLAND Papillote Fish-o-Lolo	IN: Through to Rapid Cook-off
WGN	SM: Steve & Maura	CHINA Chicken and Prawn Crispy Pancakes with Dipping Sauce	LOW: Through to Sudden Death
WGN	DD: Dai & Dal	JAPAN Chicken Katsu with Chilli Mayonnaise and Teriyaki Sauce	IN: Through to Rapid Cook-off

==== Rapid Cook-Off ====
===== 45min Mince Challenge =====
- Episodes 20
- Airdate – 7 Oct 2015
- Description – Each team must use a minced protein and produce a dish in 45 minutes. The winning team will be safe from elimination and the losing team will compete in the Elimination Sudden Death.

===== Showdown - Mystery Crate =====
- Description – Teams were each given a mystery box to cook a dish for 4 guests. The losing team will compete in the Elimination Sudden Death.

RAPID COOK-OFF - tbd				SHOWDOWN - tbd	
Team		Dish	Result	Dish	Result
WKO	NB: Neena & Belinda	N/A (Immune)			
AUK	SD: Sam & Dan	Mozzarella-Stuffed Lamb Meatballs with Pea Purée	LOW: Through to Sudden Death	N/A (Through to Sudden Death)	
MWT	AH: Aaron & Heather	San Choy Bow Two Ways	SAFE: Winners	N/A (Immune)	
WGN	IS: Ian & Sandie	N/A (Through to Sudden Death)			
CAN	JR: Jessie & Ricki	Lasagne Cupcake	IN: Through to Showdown	Pan-Fried Salmon with Beetroot and Quinoa Salad	SAFE: Winners
AUK	JA: Josh & Aaron	Shepherd’s Pie with Winter Vegetables	IN: Through to Showdown	Duck Breast with Cauliflower Purée, Kumara Chips, Peach and Pineapple Jus	SAFE: High
WGN	SM: Steve & Maura	N/A (Through to Sudden Death)			
WGN	DD: Dai & Dal	Lao Sausage with Tomato Chutney and Cucumber Salad	IN: Through to Showdown	Lamb Rack with Parsnip Purée and Plum Chutney	LOW: Through to Sudden Death

==== Sudden Death ====
- Episodes 21
- Airdate – 8 Oct 2014
- Description – In a Double Elimination, the teams compete in the second Sudden Death Cook-Off.

Sudden Death Cook-Off Results
Team		Judge's scores						Total (out of 60)	Result
Team		Nadia	Grace	Robert	Sean	Ben	Gareth	Total (out of 60)	Result
AUK	SD: Sam & Dan	3	1	3	0	3	2	12	Eliminated
Dishes	Entree	Crispy Pulled Chicken Tacos with Guacamole and Tomato Salsa						12	Eliminated
Dishes	Main	Taco-Crusted Lamb Rack with Potato Bombas, Carrot Purée and Salsa Brava						12	Eliminated
Dishes	Dessert	Chocolate Gateau with Orange Syrup						12	Eliminated
WGN	IS: Ian & Sandie	7	7	7	6	7	7	41	Eliminated
Dishes	Entree	Pea and Pancetta Risotto						41	Eliminated
Dishes	Main	‘Grounded’ Beef Fillet with Root Vegetables						41	Eliminated
Dishes	Dessert	Tarte Au Citron						41	Eliminated
WGN	SM: Steve & Maura	8	8	7	7	7	7	44	SAFE
Dishes	Entree	Chicken Liver Parfait with Brown Butter Crumb, Plum Jelly, Balsamic Reduction						44	SAFE
Dishes	Main	Sous Vide Fillet Steak with Truffled Gnocchi, Peas and Watercress Purée, Madeira Jus						44	SAFE
Dishes	Dessert	Chocolate Delice with Espresso Crème Fraiche and Salted Caramel Sauce						44	SAFE
WGN	DD: Dai & Dal	8	9	8	8	9	9	51	SAFE
Dishes	Entree	Banh Cuon Vietnamese Rice Roll with Prawns						51	SAFE
Dishes	Main	Tom Khen Caramelised Pork Belly						51	SAFE
Dishes	Dessert	Pavlova with Passionfruit and Lychees						51	SAFE

=== Sudden Death - Round 6 ===
==== People's Choice 3: Lunch Platter Challenge ====
- Episodes 22
- Airdate – 12 Oct 2014
- Description – Teams headed into the third challenge to each serve two platters for ten diners. The team who impresses the most will be safe from elimination and the weakest team will be the first into the Sudden Death Cook-Off. All other surviving teams are through to the next challenge.

People's Choice
Team		Dish	Result
WKO	NB: Neena & Belinda	Ploughman’s Lunch Smoked Cheese Scones, Onion and Fig Jam, Fried Halloumi, Meats and Homemade Butter	WIN: People's Choice. Immune.
MWT	AH: Aaron & Heather	Beef Cheek Pies with Potato Topping, Caprese Salad, Buffalo Mozzarella and Croutons	IN: Through to Rapid Cook-off
CAN	JR: Jessie & Ricki	Cheesy Chicken Breast with Balsamic Roast Veges and Potato and Leek Smash	IN: Through to Rapid Cook-off
AUK	JA: Josh & Aaron	Beef Eye Fillet with Mushroom Sauce and Roast Vegetables	IN: Through to Rapid Cook-off
WGN	SM: Steve & Maura	Mexican Fiesta Soft Shell Pork and Prawn Tacos with Dirty Rice and Refried Beans	LOW: Through to Sudden Death
WGN	DD: Dai & Dal	BBQ Sticky Ribs with Potato and Corn Salad	IN: Through to Rapid Cook-off

==== Rapid Cook-Off ====
===== 45min Ultimate Breakfast Challenge =====
- Episodes 23
- Airdate – 14 Oct 2015
- Description – Each team must cook a breakfast dish in 45 minutes. The winning team will be safe from elimination. The other teams will cook again in the showdown. In a twist, after choosing their star, the teams moved clockwise and took the next team's choice.

===== Showdown - Cheese =====
- Description – The remaining three teams must cook a cheese dish in 45 minutes. The losing team will compete in the Elimination Sudden Death.

RAPID COOK-OFF - tbd				SHOWDOWN - tbd	
Team		Dish	Result	Dish	Result
WKO	NB: Neena & Belinda	N/A (Immune)			
MWT	AH: Aaron & Heather	Banana Pancakes with Berry Compote, Maple Syrup Mascarpone and Smoothie	IN: Through to Showdown	Macaroni Cheese with Roquefort Salad & Croque Monsieur	SAFE: High
CAN	JR: Jessie & Ricki	Chorizo Omelette with Tomato Bean Sauce	IN: Through to Showdown	Three Cheese Quesadilla with Guacamole	LOW: Through to Sudden Death
AUK	JA: Josh & Aaron	Bacon and Egg Pie with Spicy Relish	SAFE: High	N/A (Immune)	
WGN	SM: Steve & Maura	N/A (Through to Sudden Death)			
WGN	DD: Dai & Dal	Stuffed Mushrooms with Poached Egg	IN: Through to Showdown	Goat’s Cheese Ravioli with Blue Cheese Sauce	SAFE: Winners

==== Sudden Death ====
- Episodes 24
- Airdate – 15 Oct 2014
- Description – Teams compete in the third Sudden Death Cook-Off.

Sudden Death Cook-Off Results
Team		Judge's scores						Total (out of 60)	Result
Team		Nadia	Grace	Robert	Sean	Ben	Gareth	Total (out of 60)	Result
CAN	JR: Jessie & Ricki	7	7	7	7	8	8	44	SAFE
Dishes	Entree	Butternut Squash Ravioli with Sage Butter Sauce						44	SAFE
Dishes	Main	Lemon Chicken with Colourful Salad						44	SAFE
Dishes	Dessert	After Dinner Delight						44	SAFE
WGN	SM: Steve & Maura	8	7	8	7	7	6	43	Eliminated
Dishes	Entree	Yellowfin Tuna and Hapuka Sashimi with Wasabi and Avocado Mousse, Ponzu Caviar and Yuzu Lemon Air						43	Eliminated
Dishes	Main	Star Anise Braised Beef Short Rib with Asian Greens, Garlic Pomme Purée and Baby Carrots						43	Eliminated
Dishes	Dessert	Lime and Ginger Infused Crème Brûlée with Sesame Tuile, Yuzu Gel and Vanilla Cream Mousse						43	Eliminated

=== Sudden Death - Round 70 ===
==== People's Choice 4: Pizza Challenge ====
- Episodes 25
- Airdate – 19 Oct 2014
- Description – Teams headed into the fourth and final people’s choice challenge to serve a woodfired pizza. Diners will vote by donating for their favourite pizza and the group who received the most votes will receive People's Choice, making them safe from elimination and going straight to the semi finals. Judges Ben and Gareth sent the weakest team directly into the final Sudden Death Cook-Off. All other surviving teams are through to the next showdown.

People's Choice
Team		Pizza	Result
WKO	NB: Neena & Belinda	Indian Masala and Cashew with Raita	IN: Through to Rapid Cook-off
MWT	AH: Aaron & Heather	Prosciutto, Rocket and Parmesan and Margherita	LOW: Through to Rapid Cook-off
CAN	JR: Jessie & Ricki	Roasted Vegetables	LOW: Through to Sudden Death
AUK	JA: Josh & Aaron	Prosciutto, Mozzarella and Mushrooms	WIN: People's Choice. Immune.
WGN	DD: Dai & Dal	Prosciutto and Rocket	IN: Through to Rapid Cook-off

==== Rapid Cook-Off ====
===== Date Night Challenge =====
- Episodes 26
- Airdate – 21 Oct 2014
- Description – Each team must cook a romantic date night main dish with the winner going straight to the semi finals.

===== Showdown - Chocolate =====
- Description – Teams had to create two portions of their best chocolate dish. The losing team will compete in the Elimination Sudden Death.

RAPID COOK-OFF - tbd				SHOWDOWN - tbd	
Team		Dish	Result	Dish	Result
WKO	NB: Neena & Belinda	Eye Fillet with Bone Marrow Butter and Nettle Chimichurri	IN: Through to Showdown	Chocolate Tart with Boozy Date and Orange Salad	LOW: Through to Sudden Death
MWT	AH: Aaron & Heather	Hapuka Fillet with Oysters Two Ways and Melon Caviar	IN: Through to Showdown	Chocolate Cake with Mango Curd	SAFE: Winners
CAN	JR: Jessie & Ricki	N/A (Through to Sudden Death)			
AUK	JA: Josh & Aaron	N/A (Immune)			
WGN	DD: Dai & Dal	Duck Breast with Spiced Plum Sauce and Fondant Potatoes	SAFE: Winners	N/A (Immune)	

==== Sudden Death ====
- Episodes 27
- Airdate – 22 Oct 2014
- Description – Teams compete in the fourth and last Sudden Death Cook-Off.

Sudden Death Cook-Off Results
Team		Judge's scores						Total (out of 60)	Result
Team		Nadia	Grace	Robert	Sean	Ben	Gareth	Total (out of 60)	Result
WKO	NB: Neena & Belinda	9	9	9	9	9	8	53	SAFE
Dishes	Entree	Chilli Kelp Spiced Lamb with Smoky Eggplant Purée, Dried Figs and Chèvre						53	SAFE
Dishes	Main	Pan Fried Hapuka with Jewelled Couscous, Preserved Lemon Gremolata and Harissa Yoghurt						53	SAFE
Dishes	Dessert	Panna Cotta with Roasted Rhubarb and Orange and Salted Macadamia Crumb						53	SAFE
CAN	JR: Jessie & Ricki	7	7	7	8	7	7	43	Eliminated
Dishes	Entree	Cheese Tortellini in Broth						43	Eliminated
Dishes	Main	Eye Fillet with Herb Sauce						43	Eliminated
Dishes	Dessert	Coconut Panna Cotta with Mango Sauce						43	Eliminated

=== Semi-Finals ===
==== Semi-Final 1 ====
- Episodes 31
- Airdate – 26 Oct 2014
- Description – Two teams in the first Semi-Final Cook-Off. The lower scoring team is eliminated and the winner proceeds through to the Grand Final.

Semi-Final Cook-Off Results
Team		Judge's scores						Total (out of 60)	Result
Team		Nadia	Grace	Robert	Sean	Ben	Gareth	Total (out of 60)	Result
MWT	AH: Aaron & Heather	9	10	9	8	9	9	54	SAFE
Dishes	Entree	Yellowfin Tuna Tartare with Lime Moina Tai and Plantain Chip						54	SAFE
Dishes	Main	Duo of Short Beef Rib and Fillet with Celeriac Purée, Madeira Sauce, Pommes Frites, Crispy Shallot and Pak Choy						54	SAFE
Dishes	Dessert	Meika Poke, Panikeke and Chili Chocolate Ganache						54	SAFE
AUK	JA: Josh & Aaron	8	9	8	8	9	8	50	Eliminated
Dishes	Entree	West Coast Whitebait Fritters with Shaved Fennel Salad						50	Eliminated
Dishes	Main	Verjuice-Poached Crayfish Tails with Crayfish Tortellini and String Vegetables						50	Eliminated
Dishes	Dessert	Poached Wild Pear Crumble						50	Eliminated

==== Semi-Final 2 ====
- Episodes 32
- Airdate – 28 Oct 2014
- Description – Two teams in the second Semi-Final Cook-Off. The lower scoring team is eliminated and the other team becomes the second team to proceed into the Grand Final.

Semi-Final Cook-Off Results
Team		Judge's scores						Total (out of 60)	Result
Team		Nadia	Grace	Robert	Sean	Ben	Gareth	Total (out of 60)	Result
WKO	NB: Neena & Belinda	9	10	9	9	9	9	55	SAFE
Dishes	Entree	Sirloin and Prosciutto Wrapped Prawns with Chilli Jam, Smoked Yoghurt and Pickled Radish						55	SAFE
Dishes	Main	Sous-Vide Lamb Rack with Horopito Pumpkin Purée, Feta, Piko Piko and Caper-Lime Vinaigrette						55	SAFE
Dishes	Dessert	Lemon, Raspberry and Chocolate Cashew Cheesecake						55	SAFE
WGN	DD: Dai & Dal	8	8	7	8	8	8	47	Eliminated
Dishes	Entree	Seared Scallops with Pea Purée, Asian Vinaigrette and Pancetta Crisp						47	Eliminated
Dishes	Main	Sous-Vide Lamb with Spicy Papaya Salad and Rice						47	Eliminated
Dishes	Dessert	Chocolate Torte with Raspberry Sorbet and Tuile						47	Eliminated

=== Grand-Final ===
- Episodes 33
- Airdate – 29 Oct 2014
- Description – In the final cook-off for the series, the top two teams face-off in the ultimate Grand Final. Teams each cook a five course degustation menu in the format of a cold entree, hot entree, seafood main, meat main and dessert. Twenty plates of each course, totalling 100 plates per team were served to all eliminated teams, friends and family. Guest judges returned for the final verdict of awarding the $100,000 prize to the winners. Teams also wear chef attire and have their Instant Restaurant represented.

Grand-Final Cook-Off Results
Team		Judge's scores						Total (out of 60)	Result
Team		Nadia	Grace	Robert	Sean	Ben	Gareth	Total (out of 60)	Result
WKO	NB: Neena & Belinda	9	8	8	9	9	9	52	WINNERS
Dishes		DANDELION						52	WINNERS
1st course: cold entrée		Marinated Scallops with Crisp Celeriac Salad, Forest Ham and Pecorino						52	WINNERS
2nd course: hot entrée		Halloumi-Stuffed Zucchini Flowers with Peperonata						52	WINNERS
3rd course: seafood main		Manuka-Smoked Salmon with Samphire, Horseradish Crème Fraiche, Lemon Pickle and Oatcakes						52	WINNERS
4th course: meat main		Spiced Pomegranate Lamb with Heirloom Carrots, Sheep’s Labneh and Wild Weed Harissa						52	WINNERS
5th course: dessert		Passion on a Plate Passionfruit Three Ways						52	WINNERS
MWT	AH: Aaron & Heather	9	9	9	8	8	8	51	Runners-up
Dishes		TATOU						51	Runners-up
1st course: cold entrée		Oysters Three Ways with Upside-Down Ika Mata						51	Runners-up
2nd course: hot entrée		Seafood Risotto with Grissini						51	Runners-up
3rd course: seafood main		Boil Up						51	Runners-up
4th course: meat main		Sous-Vide Quarter Chicken with Polenta, Pickled Savoy Cabbage and Artichokes						51	Runners-up
5th course: dessert		Te Pai Remene Lemon Pie						51	Runners-up

== Episodes ==
Round	Episode		Original airdate	Timeslot
1	1	Instant Restaurant Round: NB: Neena & Belinda	24 August 2014	Sunday 7:30pm
1	2	Instant Restaurant Round: SD: Sam & Dan	26 August 2014	Wednesday 7:30pm
1	3	Instant Restaurant Round: JS: June & Steph	27 August 2014	Thursday 7:30pm
1	4	Instant Restaurant Round: DC: Dan & Christie	31 August 2014	Sunday 7:30pm
1	5	Instant Restaurant Round: TN: Tracey & Niel	2 September 2014	Wednesday 7:30pm
2	6	Instant Restaurant Round: AH: Aaron & Heather	3 September 2014	Thursday 7:30pm
2	7	Instant Restaurant Round: IS: Ian & Sandie	7 September 2014	Sunday 7:30pm
2	8	Instant Restaurant Round: JR: Jessie & Ricki	9 September 2014	Wednesday 7:30pm
2	9	Instant Restaurant Round: JA: Josh & Aaron	10 September 2014	Thursday 7:30pm
2	10	Instant Restaurant Round: KM: Kelly & Megan	14 September 2014	Sunday 7:30pm
3	11	Instant Restaurant Round: TJ: Theresa & Joelle	16 September 2014	Wednesday 7:30pm
3	12	Instant Restaurant Round: TN: Tracy & Niel	17 September 2014	Thursday 7:30pm
3	13	Instant Restaurant Round: JA: Josh & Aaron	21 September 2014	Sunday 7:30pm
3	14	Instant Restaurant Round: SM: Steve & Maura	23 September 2014	Wednesday 7:30pm
3	15	Instant Restaurant Round: DD: Dai & Dal	24 September 2014	Thursday 7:30pm
4	16	People's Choice Challenge :	28 September 2014	Sunday 7:30pm
4	17	Rapid Cook-Off & Showdown:	30 September 2014	Wednesday 7:30pm
4	18	Sudden Death:	1 October 2014	Thursday 7:30pm
5	19	People's Choice Challenge:	5 October 2014	Sunday 7:30pm
5	20	Rapid Cook-Off & Showdown:	7 October 2014	Wednesday 7:30pm
5	21	Sudden Death:	8 October 2014	Thursday 7:30pm
6	22	People's Choice Challenge:	12 October 2014	Sunday 7:30pm
6	23	Rapid Cook-Off & Showdown:	14 October 2014	Wednesday 7:30pm
6	24	Sudden Death:	15 October 2014	Thursday 7:30pm
7	25	People's Choice Challenge:	19 October 2014	Sunday 7:30pm
7	26	Rapid Cook-Off & Showdown:	21 October 2014	Wednesday 7:30pm
7	27	Sudden Death:	22 October 2014	Thursday 7:30pm
8	31	Semi-Final:	26 October 2014	Sunday 7:30pm
9	32	Semi-Final:	28 October 2014	Wednesday 7:30pm
10	33	Grand Final:	29 October 2014	Thursday 7:30pm
