= Cecilia Robinson =

Cecilia Robinson may refer to:

- Cecilia Robinson (cricketer)
- Cecilia Robinson (entrepreneur)
