= Cecilia Robinson (entrepreneur) =

Swedish-New Zealand entrepreneur

Cecilia Robinson ONZM
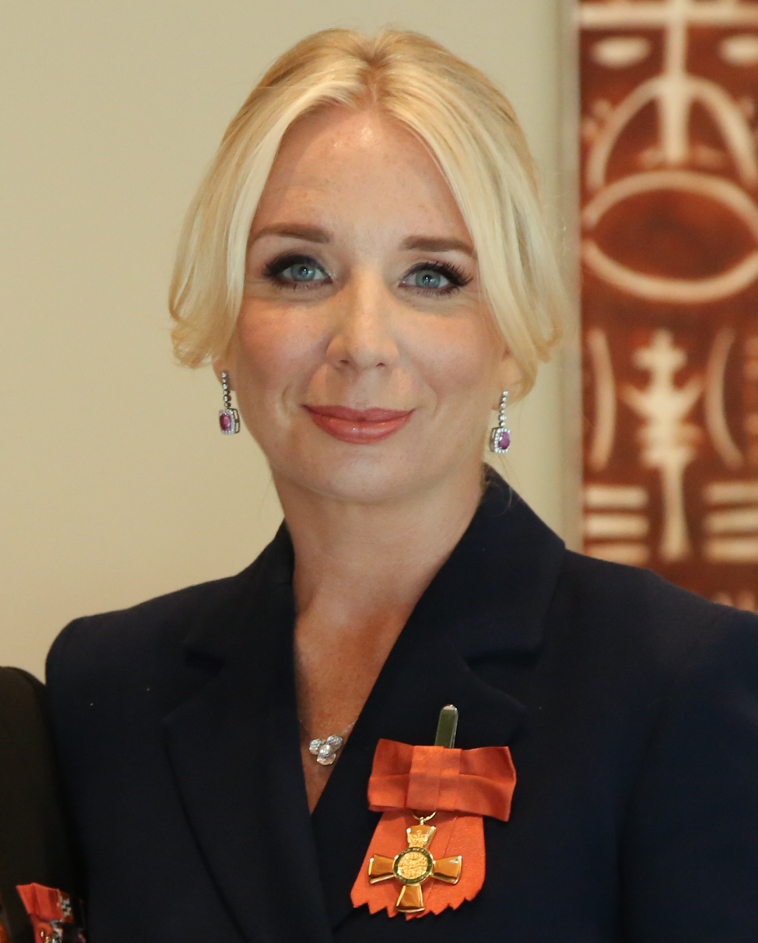
- Robinson in 2026
- Born: 1985 (age 40–41); Sweden
- Citizenship: New Zealand
- Occupation: Entrepreneur
- Known for: My Food Bag

Cecilia Charlotte Louise Robinson ONZM (born 1985), originally from Sweden, is a New Zealand entrepreneur and founder of the My Food Bag business.

== Biography ==
Robinson grew up in Sweden and moved to the United States to work as a nanny before making a trip to New Zealand to visit her brother, who was living there. She stayed and enrolled to study law at the University of Auckland, but dropped out to start an online nanny website, Au Pair Link. The business quickly grew to be the biggest au pair company in Australasia. Robinson sold the company in 2014.

In late 2012, Robinson and her husband James established My Food Bag in New Zealand with former Telecom CEO Theresa Gattung, celebrity chef Nadia Lim, and Lim's husband Carlos Bagrie. The business was launched in March 2013. The founding team sold 70% of the company to Waterman Capital in 2016 and appointed new CEO Kevin Bowler mid 2018. Robinson continues with the business as a director.

In 2020, Robinson founded Tend Health, a primary healthcare provider driven by digital-technology, with her husband James, Dr Mataroria Lyndon and Josh Robb.

== Honours and awards ==
In 2013, Robinson won the EY Young Entrepreneur of the Year Award. In 2014, Robinson was named NEXT Woman of the Year in the Business category. In 2017 she won the Business Enterprise Award and the Supreme Award at the New Zealand Women of Influence Awards.

In 2024, Robinson was awarded Innovator of the Year in the New Zealander of the Year Awards.

In the 2026 New Year Honours, Robinson was appointed an Officer of the New Zealand Order of Merit, for services to business and women.
