= My Food Bag =

New Zealand meal kit home delivery service

My Food Bag Group Limited
- My Food Bag logo
- Type: Public
- Traded as: NZX: MFB
- Industry: Retail e-commerce grocery delivery
- Founded: 11 December 2012; 13 years ago in Auckland, New Zealand
- Founders: Cecilia Robinson; James Robinson; Theresa Gattung; Nadia Lim; Carlos Bagrie
- Headquarters: Level 3, 56 Parnell Road, Parnell, Auckland, New Zealand
- Areas served: New Zealand
- Key people: Tony Carter (Independent Chair); Mark Winter (CEO)
- Number of employees: 200+ (2021)
- Website: www.myfoodbag.co.nz

My Food Bag is a New Zealand meal-kit home-delivery service providing customers with ingredients and recipes to cook meals. The company is publicly traded and was floated on the NZX and ASX on 5 March 2021.

== History ==
My Food Bag is New Zealand's longest-standing meal-kit provider. The business was co-founded by Cecilia Robinson and her husband James Robinson, together with celebrity chef and nutritionist Nadia Lim and her husband Carlos Bagrie, and Theresa Gattung.

My Food Bag was launched in Auckland, with first deliveries made in March 2013. My Food Bag expanded into the Wellington region in September 2013 and then into the South Island in November 2014.

In 2016, New Zealand private equity firm Waterman Capital invested in My Food Bag. In June 2018, co-CEOs Cecilia and James Robinson moved to non-executive director roles and Kevin Bowler was appointed as CEO.

My Food Bag was floated on the NZX and ASX on 5 March 2021 and Mark Winter has been CEO since 2022.

== Business ==
My Food Bag delivers its customers weekly boxes that contain recipes and the food ingredients needed to make their dinners for a week. Recipes are designed by My Food Bag's Development Kitchen team, and ingredients are predominantly sourced from local suppliers, with all meats and eggs being free range or free farmed.

My Food Bag has a broad range of recipes under the My Food Bag brand including Quick & Easy, Gluten Free, Vegetarian and Low Carb to cater for different tastes and preferences.

In mid-2016, My Food Bag expanded its offering with the launch of Bargain Box and in 2017 launched a new product range called Fresh Start designed specifically for people wanting to manage their weight. In 2019 My Food Bag entered the ready-made meal market.

In 2024, My Food Bag expanded beyond weeknight meals into the gifting market, with the launch of the My Food Bag Shop which offers foodie gifts and care packages for fast nationwide delivery.

My Food Bag launched a Diabetes Plan in 2025 in partnership with Diabetes NZ. In 2026, My Food Bag introduced a GLP-1 Support menu under its Fresh Start brand, coinciding with the broader availability of GLP-1 medications to consumers in New Zealand.

== Awards ==
- No.1 meal kit delivery service. (2025)
- 2 Degrees Supreme Employer of the Year Award (2024)
- HRNZ Organisational Change Winner (2023)
- Westpac Supreme Business Excellence Award (2017)
- TVNZ Marketing awards – Emerging Brand (2014)
- Deloitte Fast 50 – National Rising Star (2014)
- Westpac Excellence in Innovation Business Awards (2014)
