= My Kitchen Rules NZ series 4 =

My Kitchen Rules NZ (series 4)
- Series 4

Release
- Original network: TVNZ 2
- Original release: October 7, 2018

Series chronology
- ← Previous; Series 3 (2017) Next → TBC

My Kitchen Rules NZ series 4 is a reality television cooking programme which airs on TVNZ 2. It follows last season's truncated format of only one instant restaurant round, however, after the first round, sudden elimination public challenges follows before one-on-one cookoffs semifinals off-sote rather than inside elimination houses. The series is sponsored by Harvey Norman.

The season premiered on 7 October.

== Teams ==
Region		Members	Relationship	Status
Tauranga (Papamoa)	TGA	Sindy & Roger	Tauranga Lovebirds	Eliminated 18 November
Auckland (Howick)	AUK	May & Enna	Auckland Cousins	Eliminated 25 November
New Plymouth	NPL	Liam & Eden	New Plymouth Dad & Daughter	Winner
Whakatane (Opotaki)	WHK	Pat & Wilz	Whakatane Relations （Cousins）	Eliminated 11 November
Auckland	AUK	Jacqui & Nic	Auckland Married Dentists	Eliminated 2 December
Dunedin	DUN	Jess & Cindy	Dunedin Formidable Friends	Runner-up

== Competition details ==
=== Instant restaurants ===
- Episodes 1 to 6
- Airdate – 7 Oct to 11 Nov 2018
- Description – Teams were to transform their homes into an 'Instant Restaurant', serving opposing teams and judges a three course meal (Entrée, Main and Dessert). All teams are judged and scored by the other teams, and also by Pete and Manu.

Instant Restaurant Summary
Instant Restaurant Round
Team and Episode Details		Guest scores						Pete's Scores			Manu's Scores			Total (out of 110)	Rank	Result
Team and Episode Details		SR	ME	LE	PW	JN	JC	Entrée	Main	Dessert	Entrée	Main	Dessert	Total (out of 110)	Rank	Result
TGA	SR: Sindy & Roger	-	6	6	6	5	4	6	9	3	7	8	3	63	5th	5th Eliminated 18 November
Ep 1	7 October 2018	The Calabash														5th Eliminated 18 November
Dishes	Entrée	Ceviche and Tortillas														5th Eliminated 18 November
Dishes	Main	Grilled Ostrich with Potato Gratin, Cranberry and Red Wine Jus														5th Eliminated 18 November
Dishes	Dessert	Rooibos Tea-Infused Crème Caramel with Crunchie Twist														5th Eliminated 18 November
AUK	ME: May & Enna	5	-	7	7	8	7	9	9	10	10	6	10	88	1st	4th Eliminated 25 November
Ep 2	14 October 2018	Mei Mei (Little Sisters)														4th Eliminated 25 November
Dishes	Entrée	Pork and Vegetable Dumpling with Chilli Broth Oil														4th Eliminated 25 November
Dishes	Main	Crispy Pork belly with Kumara Purée														4th Eliminated 25 November
Dishes	Dessert	Fried Nai Wong Bao (Milk and egg yolk buns) with Matcha Ice Cream														4th Eliminated 25 November
NPL	LE: Liam & Eden	3	7	-	6	6	5	4	7	10	5	7	10	70	4th	Winner
Ep 3	21 October 2018	The Hunter & The Gatherer														Winner
Dishes	Entrée	Ravioli with Tomato and Basil														Winner
Dishes	Main	Wild Venison with Kumara Stack, Sourberry and Pikopiko (hen & chicken fern)														Winner
Dishes	Dessert	Raspberry and Rose Water Cheesecake														Winner
WHK	PW: Pat & Wilz	3	5	4	-	4	4	1	7	3	1	7	3	42	6th (Bottom)	6th Eliminated 11 November
Ep 4	28 October 2018	KaiRua (Nourishing Spiritual Food)														6th Eliminated 11 November
Dishes	Entrée	Smoked Kahawai (Arripus trutta) with Crostini and Chunky Tomato Salad														6th Eliminated 11 November
Dishes	Main	Pan-fried Snapper with Stir-fried Vegetables and Seared Scallops														6th Eliminated 11 November
Dishes	Dessert	Chocolate Mousse with Hot Chocolate Shot														6th Eliminated 11 November
AUK	JN: Jacqui & Nic	6	6	7	8	-	7	9	7	7	9	7	8	81	3rd (Safe)	3rd
Ep 5	4 November 2018	Al Dente														3rd
Dishes	Entrée	Scallops with Sweet Corn Purée and Black Pudding														3rd
Dishes	Main	Duck Cooked Two Ways (Breast and Legs) with Potato and Cauliflower Purée, Baby Vegetables and Spiced Sauce														3rd
Dishes	Dessert	Mini Croquembouche														3rd
DUN	JC: Jess & Cindy	NR (Not Revealed)	NR	NR	NR	-	35	8	9	9	7	8	10	86	2nd (Safe)	2nd
Ep 6	11 November 2018	Grit and Grace														2nd
Dishes	Entrée	Beetroot Ravioli with Mint and Walnut Pesto														2nd
Dishes	Main	Sous Vide Pork Tenderloins														2nd
Dishes	Dessert	Mirror Glaze Mousse														2nd

=== Sudden Death ===
==== Sudden Death People's Choice Challenge ====
- Episode 7
- Airdate – 18 Nov 2018
- Description – The remaining guest set up pop-up stores in Auckland Viaduct Basin where they serve 2 dishes barbecue dishes for the public and sailors in the Volvo Ocean Race in a 1.5-hour service after 1.5 hours prep time. The team the earns the most votes gains People's Choice. As winners of the instant restaurant round, ME: May & Enna immediately advances to the semi-finals, have free pass to try other contestant's foods, but have no judging rights.
- JN: Jacqui & Nic (AUK) - Whitebait fritters, Harissa Spiced Lamb with Smoked eggplant Baba ghanoush JC: Jess & Cindy (DUN) - Fish Taco tortellas, Mexican Beef salad LE: Liam & Eden (NPL) - Prawn caprese skewers, Lamb feta meatball with zoodles (zucchini noodles) (People's Choice) SR: Sindy & Roger (TGA) - Salt n' Pepper Squid with Chilli lime dressing, Mediterranean Lamb Kofta with Tahini Sauce on Pita bread (Eliminated)

==== Sudden Death Semi-Finals 1 ====
- Episode 8
- Airdate – 25 Nov 2018
- Description – ME: May & Enna vs. LE: Liam & Eden. Seeding determined by placings in the Instant Restaurant Round. Cooking simultaneously in the same commercial kitchen in Allely Estate, Kumeu, Auckland, they are to prepare a multi-course meal to the judges, with the entrée to be served in 2 hours, remaining contestants and special guests: Sam Wallace, Toni Street and friends for Sam's birthday bash, with the losing team to be eliminated on the spot.

Sudden Death Cook-Off results
Sudden Death Cook-Off 1
Team		Guests' scores		Judges' scores						Total (out of 90)	Result
Team		Sam Wallace and Friends (out of 10)	Guest Teams (out of 20)	Pete			Manu			Total (out of 90)	Result
AUK	ME: May & Enna (1)	5	10	6	7	7	6	6	7	54	Eliminated
Dishes	Entrée	Pork Congee with Youtiao (Chinese Fried bread)								54	Eliminated
Dishes	Main	Chinese Braised Lamb with Potatoes and Rice								54	Eliminated
Dishes	Dessert	Lychee sorbet with meringue and pistachio								54	Eliminated
NPL	LE: Liam & Eden (4)	7	15	9	8	7	10	7	7	70	Safe (Through to Final)
Dishes	Entrée	Eggplant Involtini								70	Safe (Through to Final)
Dishes	Main	Goat Curry with Cauliflower rice and Tzatziki								70	Safe (Through to Final)
Dishes	Dessert	Vegan Cacao Caramel Popcorn								70	Safe (Through to Final)

==== Sudden Death Semi-Finals 2 ====
- Episode 9
- Airdate – 2 December 2018
- Description – JC: Jess and Cindy (2) vs. JN: Jacqui and Nic (3). Cooking simultaneously in the same commercial kitchen, they are to prepare a multi-course meal to the judges, with the entrée to be served in 2 hours, remaining contestants and special guests: KidsCan organiser, benefactor and various radio DJ's for a KidsCan charity lunch, with the losing team to be eliminated on the spot. As LE: Liam & Eden is the only guest team left, the scores only total to 80 points.

Sudden Death Cook-Off results
Sudden Death Cook-Off 2
Team		Guests' scores	Judges' scores		Total (out of 80)	Result
Team		Guests and LE (out of 20)	Pete	Manu	Total (out of 80)	Result
DUN	JC: Jess and Cindy (2)					Safe (Through to Final)
Dishes	Entrée					Safe (Through to Final)
Dishes	Main					Safe (Through to Final)
Dishes	Dessert					Safe (Through to Final)
AUK	JN: Jacqui and Nic (3)					Eliminated
Dishes	Entrée					Eliminated
Dishes	Main					Eliminated
Dishes	Dessert					Eliminated

==== Final ====
- Episode 10
- Airdate – 9 December 2018
- Description – JC: Jess and Cindy (2) vs. LE: Liam & Eden (4). Cooking simultaneously in the same commercial kitchen in Sid At The French Cafe in Eden Terrace, Auckland, they are to prepare a multi-course meal to the judges, a panel of 4 professional chefs (Ray McVinnie, Nadia Lim), the other contestants and two members of family from each contestant, with the entrée to be served in 2 hours. Unlike previous rounds, the returning competitors and family members have no scoring rights. Pete and Manu, like the chef's panel, only score once for the meal overall.

Colour Key:
– Elimination Episode
– Finals Week

Round	Episode		Original Airdate	Timeslot
1	1	Instant Restaurant Round: SR: Sindy & Roger (TGA)	7 October 2018	Sunday 7:30pm
1	2	Instant Restaurant Round: ME: May & Enna (AUK)	14 October 2018	Sunday 7:30pm
1	3	Instant Restaurant Round: LE: Liam & Eden (NPL)	21 October 2018	Sunday 7:30pm
1	4	Instant Restaurant Round: PW: Pat & Wilz (WHK)	28 October 2018	Sunday 7:30pm
1	5	Instant Restaurant Round: JN: Jacqui & Nic (AUK)	4 November 2018	Sunday 7:30pm
1	6	Instant Restaurant Round: JC: Jess & Cindy (DUN)	11 November 2018	Sunday 7:30pm
2	7	Sudden Death Round: Pop-up Stall Challenge	18 November 2018	Sunday 7:30pm
2	8	Sudden Death Round: Sam Wallace's birthday bash ME: May & Enna (1) vs. LE: Liam & Eden (4)	25 November 2018	Sunday 7:30pm
3	9	Semi-final: KidsCan Charity Lunch JC: Jess and Cindy (2) vs. JN: Jacqui and Nic (3)	2 December 2018	Sunday 7:30pm
4	10	Grand Final: JC: Jess and Cindy (2) vs. LE: Liam & Eden (4)	9 December 2018	Sunday 7:30pm
