= Theresa Gattung =

New Zealand businesswoman

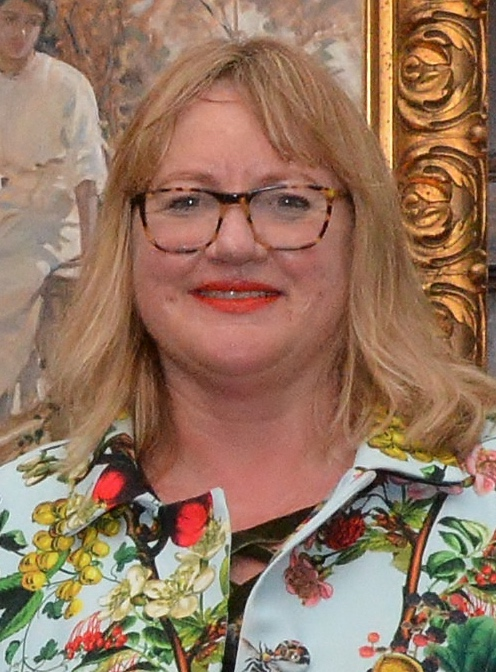
Gattung in 2017

Dame Theresa Elizabeth Gattung DNZM (born 1962) is a New Zealand businessperson and the former chief executive of Telecom New Zealand (1993–2007).

== Early life ==
Gattung was born in Wellington in 1962, the eldest of four daughters. She was educated at McKillop College, Rotorua, the University of Waikato (graduating with a Bachelor of Management Studies in marketing) and Victoria University of Wellington (graduating with a Bachelor of Laws).

== Career ==
Gattung worked in senior marketing roles at National Mutual and at the Bank of New Zealand before taking up a similar role at Telecom New Zealand. In April 1996, she became Telecom's Group General Manager Services. In October 1999, she took over from Rod Deane as Telecom's CEO of the telecommunications business with a $5 billion turnover operating in New Zealand and Australia and listed on the NZX, ASX and NYSE. Gattung was the first woman to run a large New Zealand public company. During her tenure as CEO Gattung led Telecom through world-changing technology developments and the evolution of the business from a traditional telco to the number one IT provider in New Zealand. Gattung resigned her position at Telecom in 2007.

From July 2008 to March 2011, Gattung was the inaugural chair of Wool Partners International, applying her leadership skills, international business experience, marketing and branding expertise to lead the company's drive to reinvigorate the international market for New Zealand's strong wools.

Following her passion for books and reading Gattung was also the chair of the New Zealand Advisory Group for the Frankfurt Book Fair 2012.

In 2013, Gattung, alongside Cecilia Robinson and Nadia Lim, co-founded food delivery business My Food Bag. Operating in New Zealand the company grew very quickly with turnover exceeding $150 million. Gattung chaired insurer AIA Australia 2010 - 2021 and was an Independent Director and Chair of AIA New Zealand's Board of Directors 2018 - 2025. She was a member of the National Advisory Board on the Employment of Women 2016 - 2025.

Gattung also currently chairs Tend, launched mid-2020 with a mission to put digital healthcare in the hands of all Kiwis, the online education content provider Telco Technology Services, Global Women.

In 2021, Gattung funded the Theresa Gattung Chair of Women in Entrepreneurship at the University of Auckland and also started the Gattung Foundation with her sister Angela Gattung as executive director of the fund.

In 2024, Gattung founded Compatico, a premium matchmaking service for singles 40+, which later changed to 30+. She sold Compatico in July 2025 to entrepreneur Elise Dalrymple-Keast.

Gattung has been involved with a number of not-for-profit and philanthropic interests, including being co-founder and trustee of the World Women Charitable Trust, the Eva Doucas Charitable Trust, Patron of the Cambodia Charitable Trust and Chair of the Wellington Board of the Society for the Prevention of Cruelty to Animals (SPCA) and then on the Royal New Zealand SPCA (RNZSPCA) National Board when all the regions joined to form a National body. She was NZ Lead for SheEO (now Coralus) 2017 - 2022, a radically redesigned ecosystem that supports, finances, and celebrates female innovators. The Arts Foundation of New Zealand partnered with Gattung in 2019 to add a $25,000 Arts Laureate prize of the Theresa Gattung Female Arts Practitioners Award.

In 2010, Gattung published an autobiography, Bird on a Wire.

== Awards and recognition ==
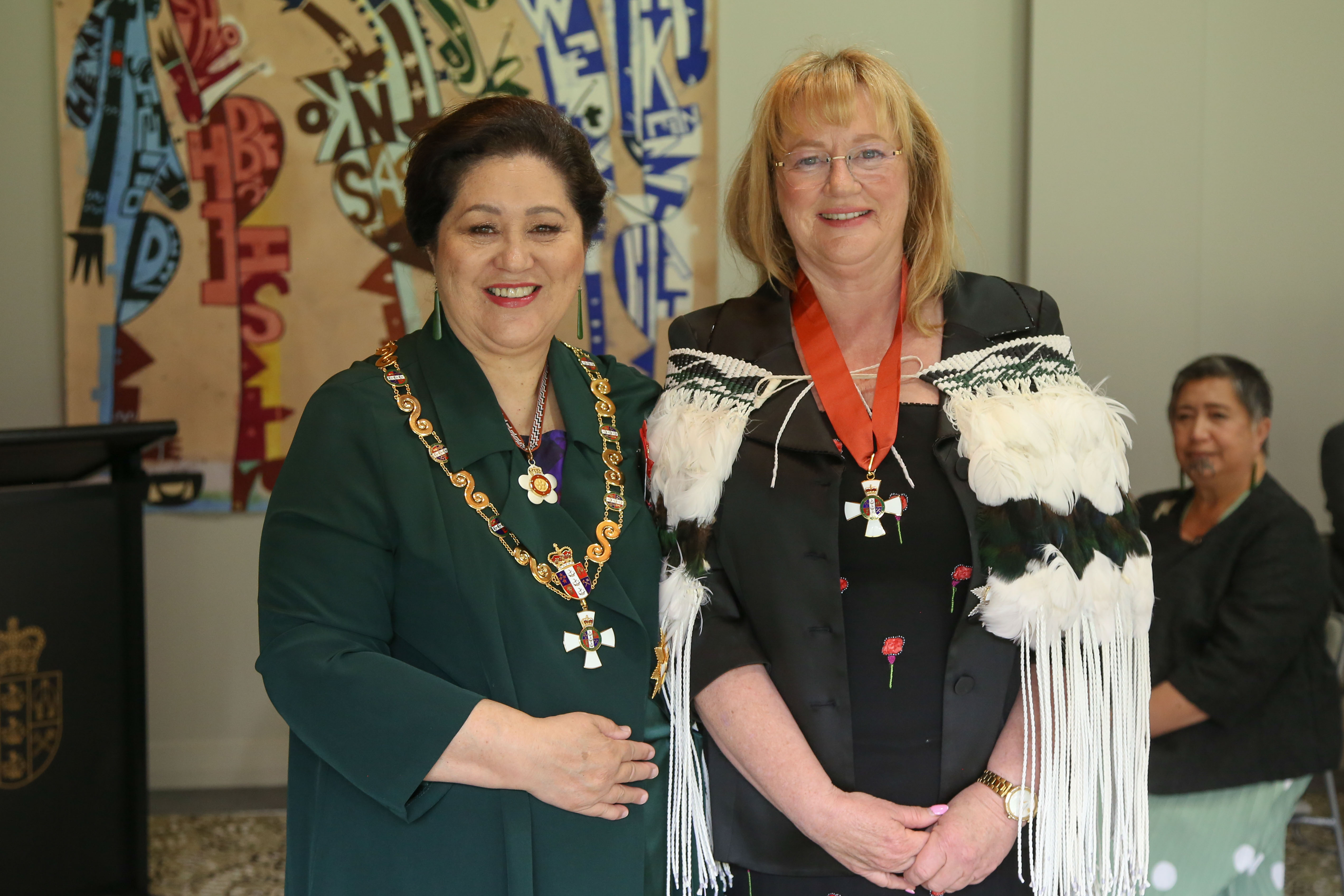
Gattung (right), after her investiture as a Dame Companion of the New Zealand Order of Merit by the governor-general, Dame Cindy Kiro, at Government House, Auckland, on 2 October 2024

In the 2015 New Year Honours, Gattung was appointed a Companion of the New Zealand Order of Merit, for services to business and philanthropy. In August 2015, she was inducted into the Marketing Hall of Fame at the 2015 TVNZ Marketing Awards. In 2017, she received the Lifetime Achievement award in the NEXT Woman of the Year awards. In September 2018, she was awarded the Lifetime Achievement award at the New Zealand Women of Influence Awards, and in February 2019 she was inducted into the RNZSPCA Hall of Fame. Gattung was inducted into the New Zealand Business Hall of Fame in 2023. In the 2024 King's Birthday Honours, Gattung was promoted to Dame Companion of the New Zealand Order of Merit, for services to women, governance and philanthropy.

Gattung has been named in Fortune magazine's list of the 50 most powerful women in international business several times, and in 2006 the Forbes list of "The World's 100 Most Powerful Women" ranked Gattung at number 49.
