= Ben Bayly =

New Zealand chef

Benjamin 'Ben' Bayly is a New Zealand chef. Bayly is known for judging My Kitchen Rules NZ alongside Gareth Stewart. He appeared as a VIP guest during a challenge in MasterChef New Zealand season seven, episode 16.

== Background ==
Ben Bayly grew up in Te Awamutu, his dad's side full of dairy farmers and his mum's full of Irish Catholics. He attended Te Awamutu College.

== Career ==
In September 2020 Bayly opened the restaurant Ahi, meaning fire in Māori, in Commercial Bay. A few weeks later Tip Top the restaurant sent a “cease and desist” letter for the restaurant's usage of the name Trumpet as a dessert.

== The Restaurant That Makes Mistakes ==
In 2023, Bayly, partnered by dementia expert Lynette Tippett, embarked on opening a pop-up fine dining restaurants staffed by eight volunteers all suffering from Parkinson's disease or dementia and Alzheimer's. In 2024, Bayly expanded the group to 10 working-age volunteers all with early onset dementia in his new restaurant - Origine Restaurant at InterContinental Hotel on 1 Queen Street, a walking distance from Ahi restaurant, Commercial Bay.

== Personal life ==
Bayly is married. He and his wife have children. He embarked on becoming an advocate for degenerative diseases after his maternal grandmother died in 2022 from dementia.
