= Robert Oliver (chef) =

New Zealand chef

Robert Oliver MNZM
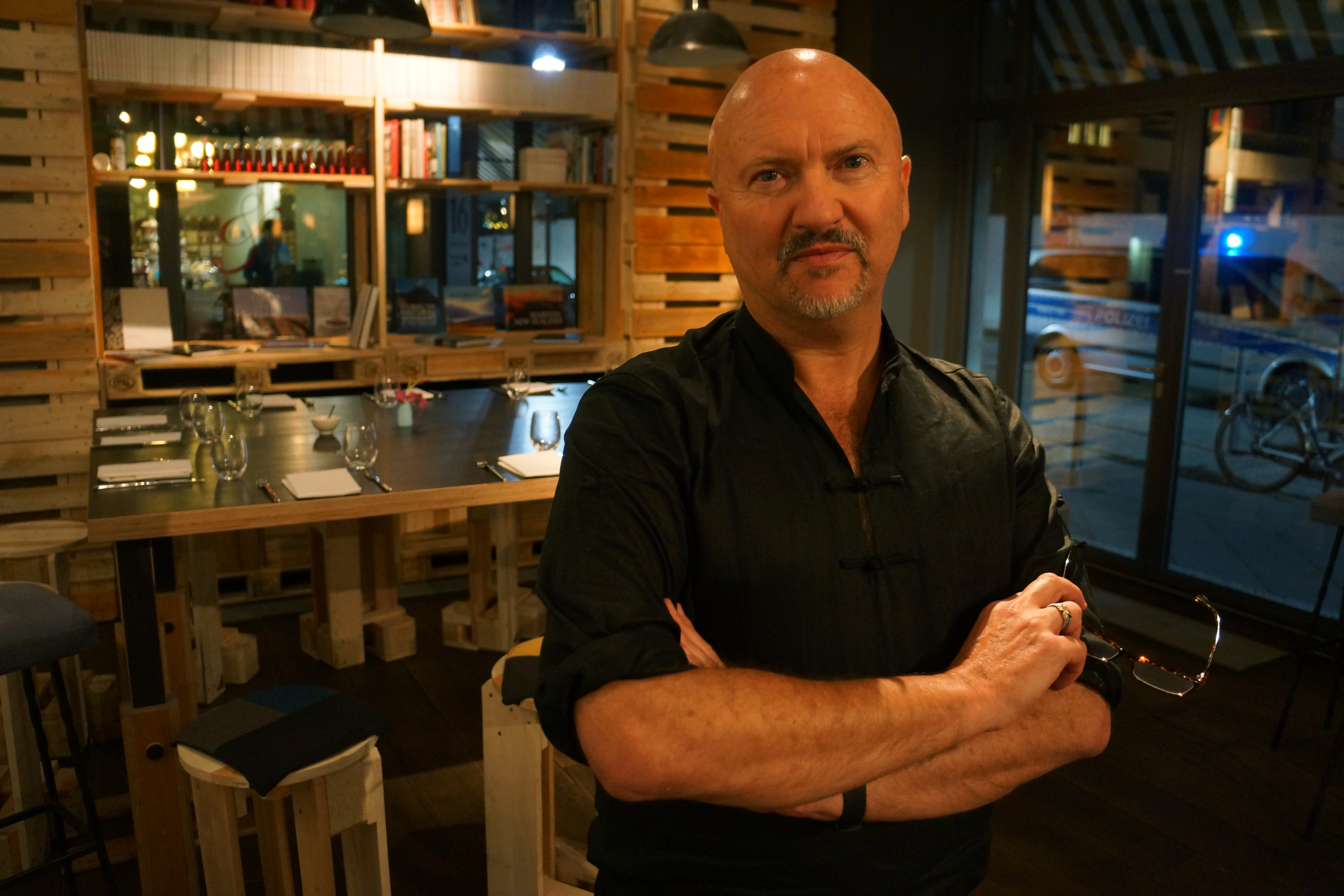
- Oliver in 2012
- Born: Robert Mark Oliver; Auckland, New Zealand
- Style: Fresh and Organic, Health food, Polynesian food, South Pacific
- Television: My Kitchen Rules New Zealand,
- Website: http://robertoliveronline.com/

Robert Mark Oliver MNZM is a New Zealand chef, author and TV presenter specialising in the cuisines of the South Pacific.

== TV shows ==
| Year | Programme | Description/Notes |
|---|---|---|
| 2019–Present | Pacific Island Food Revolution | Presenter/Part of the Tasting Panel. |
| 2014–2015 | My Kitchen Rules NZ | Part of the Tasting Panel. |
| 2013–2014 | Real Pasifik | Presenter |

== Books ==
- Me'a Kai: the Food and Flavors of the South Pacific, Random House; ISBN 9781869621759
- Mea'ai Samoa: Recipe and Stories from the Heart of Polynesia, Random House; ISBN 9781775534273

== Honours and awards ==
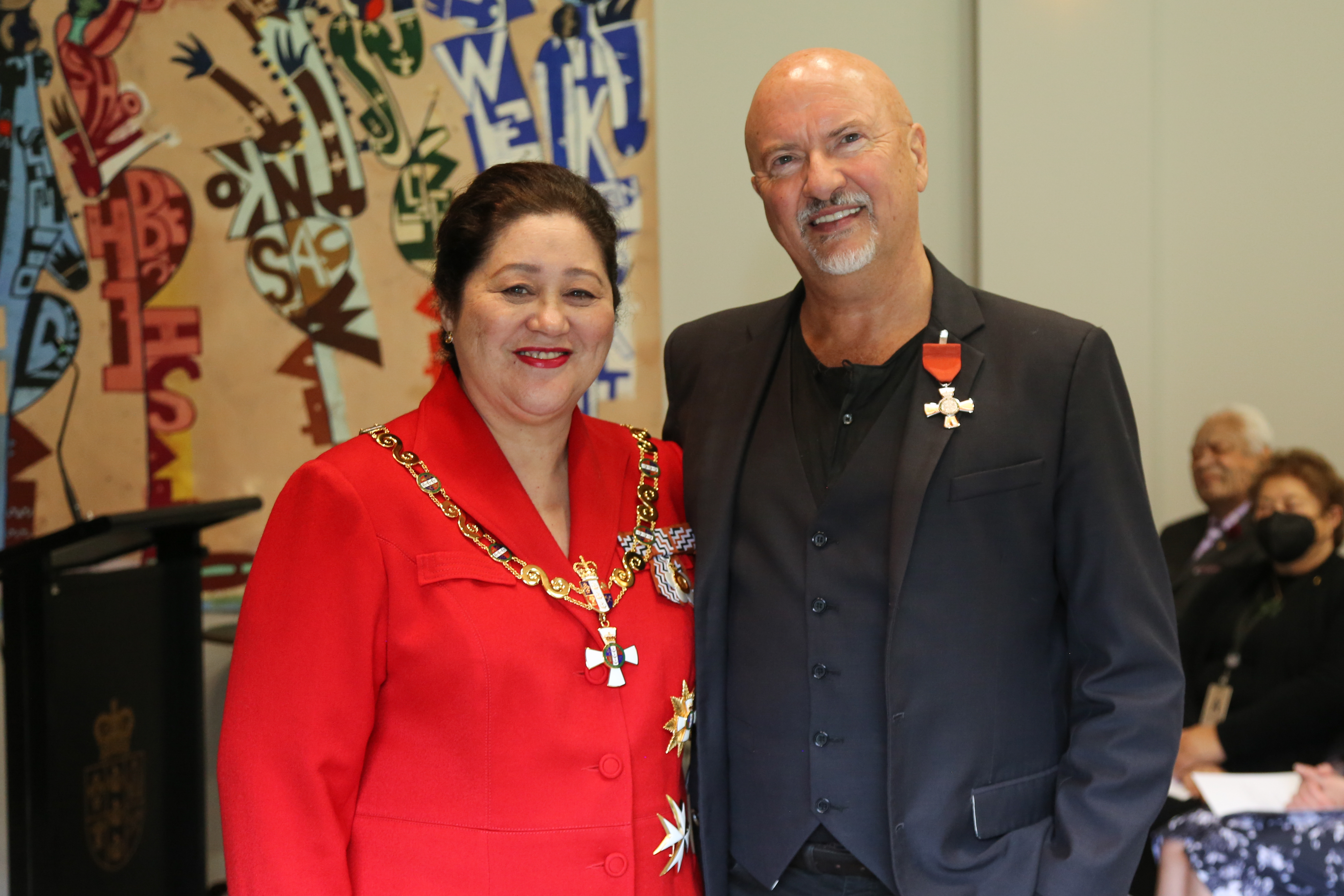
Oliver on 27 May 2022, after his investiture as a Member of the New Zealand Order of Merit by the governor-general, Dame Cindy Kiro, at Government House, Auckland

In the 2022 New Year Honours, Oliver was appointed a Member of the New Zealand Order of Merit, for services to the food industry and Pacific communities.
