= Nadia Lim =

New Zealand celebrity chef, entrepreneur, food writer and television personality

Nadia Lim ONZM
- Lim in 2014
- Born: Nadia Rui-chi Lim; 21 December 1985 (age 40); Auckland, New Zealand
- Education: University of Otago
- Occupations: Dietitian, chef
- Style: Fresh and organic, health food
- Television: New Zealand with Nadia Lim, My Kitchen Rules, MasterChef
- Spouse: Carlos Bagrie (m. 2012)
- Children: 3
- Website: nadialim.com

Nadia Rui-chi Lim (born 21 December 1985) is a New Zealand celebrity chef, entrepreneur, food writer and television personality. Lim is known as the self-proclaimed "Nude Cook" as an advocate of natural, unprocessed foods, and for creating healthy, nutritious recipes by putting a health focus behind food, which is influenced by her background as a clinical dietitian. In December 2024, Lim was appointed an Officer of the New Zealand Order of Merit, for services to the food industry.

== Early life and family ==
Lim is of New Zealand and Malaysian heritage and was born in Auckland to Julie and Ken Lim. At six years of age she moved to Kuala Lumpur where she lived for about six years. She has said that her experiences in two cultures influence her fusion cooking style of Asian and European cuisines.

Lim's father Ken died in 2014 from cancer. She is married to Carlos Bagrie and has three sons.

== Career ==
Lim graduated from the University of Otago in 2008 with a bachelor's degree in applied science in human nutrition and postgraduate diploma in dietetics. She worked from 2008 to 2011 for the Auckland District Health Board as a clinical dietitian, specialising in diabetes. She describes her recipes as healthy and focused on moderation. Lim believes that this is due in part to her background as a diabetes dietitian and understanding nutrition science.

=== Television ===
Lim won the second series of MasterChef New Zealand, airing on TV One on New Zealand in 2011; the United Kingdom in 2012 on UKTV; and in the Netherlands in 2013.

In 2014 the Asian Food Channel commissioned an eight-part television show, New Zealand with Nadia Lim, which was screened during primetime across 14 countries throughout Asia, to an audience of 130 million. The show was produced to increase awareness of New Zealand food and culture with Asian audiences. New Zealand with Nadia Lim was also aired by Sky TV's Food TV channel from August 2014 and TVNZ's TV One from November 2014.

Lim was a guest judge on the first series of My Kitchen Rules New Zealand, which broadcast on TV One in 2014 and on TV Two in 2015; she returned again in the reboot series on TV Two in 2017 and 2018.

Lim appeared on the eighth series of Dancing with the Stars in 2019 where she made it to the semifinals.

In 2020, Lim appeared on her own series, Nadia's Comfort Kitchen, in which she focused on cooking during the COVID-19 lockdown in New Zealand. Her two children appear in most episodes and her husband functioned as the cameraman. The recipes from the series were published in a cookbook, Nadia's Comfort Kitchen, which raised money for charity.

In 2022, Lim was one of three judges of the seventh series of MasterChef New Zealand.

In 2022, Lim and her husband participated in a multipart series, Nadia's Farm. In 2025, Lim appeared on her own series, Nadia's Farm Kitchen. The series also was released with her cookbook with the same name.

=== Cookbooks ===
Lim's first cookbook, Nadia's Kitchen, was released in 2012 by Random House and is focused on healthy original recipes.

In 2013, Lim released her second best-selling cookbook, Nadia Lim's Good Food Cookbook. This book received runner-up at the 2014 International Gourmand Cookbook of the Year awards (Best TV Chef category). Lim's cookbook, Vegful, also went onto receive a runner-up prize for the best vegetarian cookbook in the world in 2019.

Title	Published	ISBN
Nadia's Kitchen	2012	ISBN 9781869799113
Nadia Lim's Good Food Cookbook	2013	ISBN 9781775535065
Easy Week Night Meals	2014	ISBN 9781877505492
Fresh Start Cookbook	2015	ISBN 9781775537847
What's for Dinner?	2016	ISBN 9781877505652
Dinner Time Goodness	2017	ISBN 9780143770619
Let's Eat!	2017	ISBN 9780473400187
Family Favourites	2018	ISBN 9780143771890
Fresh Start, Feel Good	2018	ISBN 9780473445287
Vegful	2019	ISBN 9780473488529
Nadia's Comfort Kitchen	2020	ISBN 9780473527402
Marvellous Marvin	2020	ISBN 9781775437246
Nadia's Farm Kitchen	2025	ISBN 9780473752026

=== My Food Bag ===
Lim is a founder of My Food Bag, a New Zealand home delivery service that delivers recipes and fresh ingredients to customers' doors. The service was launched in 2013 by Cecilia and James Robinson, together with Lim and her husband, Carlos Bagrie, and ex-Telecom CEO Theresa Gattung.

An Australian division was launched in Sydney in August 2014. For the sixth series of MasterChef New Zealand, the winner would be employed to work for her as a chef/menu-planner as part of the prize package. She was also a guest judge on episode 12, where the winner of her "Mystery Bag – Match made in Heaven Challenge" can have their dish featured in the company's recipe, which also served as a job trial.

=== Charitable work ===
Lim has worked with a number of New Zealand charities, partnering with Diabetes New Zealand, the Heart Foundation, the Blind Foundation, the Cancer Society, the Hospice, KidsCan and Garden to Table to help encourage healthy eating and the Cambodia Charitable Trust to raise awareness of the poverty trap of underprivileged children in Cambodia. During the New Zealand COVID-19 lockdown, Lim filmed a television show shown on TV1 called Nadia's Comfort Kitchen. Following the success of the show, Lim released a cookbook where 100% of the profits were donated to two charities. In one week this raised $405,000 which was subsequently donated to Youthline and the Women's Refuge. During 2020, she released a children's book, Marvellous Marvin, with all author proceeds from the book being donated to no-kill animal shelter HUHA and food education charity Garden to Table.

=== Nadia: A Seasonal Journal ===
In December 2020, Lim launched a quarterly print publication in partnership with Lifestyle Magazine Group. Nadia: A Seasonal Journal celebrates growing, harvesting and cooking with fresh produce through the seasons. A portion of each sale goes to the Garden to Table charity, which teaches children the essential skills of gardening and cooking.

== Honours and awards ==
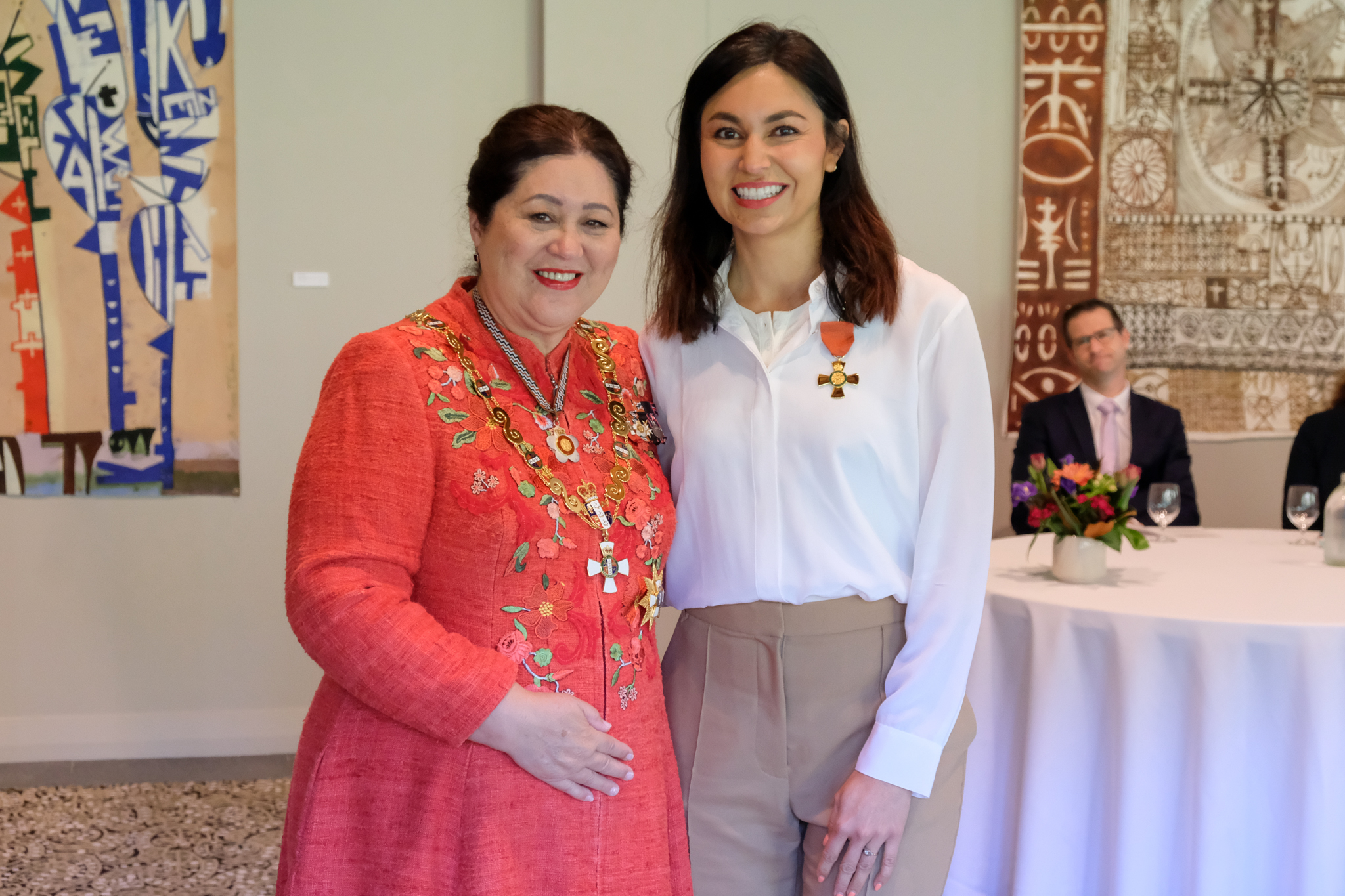
Lim (right), after her investiture as an Officer of the New Zealand Order of Merit by the governor-general, Dame Cindy Kiro, at Government House, Auckland, on 21 May 2025

In the 2025 New Year Honours, both Lim and her husband, Carlos Bagrie, were appointed Officers of the New Zealand Order of Merit; Lim for services to the food industry, and Bagrie for services to the food and rural industries.
