= Pinnell =

Pinnell is a surname. Notable people with the surname include:

- Archibald Pinnell (1870–1948), Scottish footballer
- Bernadette Pinnell, New Zealand businesswoman
- Gay Su Pinnell (born 1944), American educational theorist
- Henry Pinnell (1670 – before 18 April 1721), English politician
- Jeremy Pinnell, American country musician
- Louise R. Pinnell (1877–1966), American lawyer
- Matt Pinnell (born 1979), American politician
- Owen Pinnell (born 1947), New Zealand bobsledder
- Phillip Pinnell (born 1951), Australian footballer
- Sheldon Pinnell (c. 1937–2013), American dermatologist
