= New Zealand Women of Influence Awards =

Annual awards in ten categories

The New Zealand Women of Influence Awards are an annual set of awards which recognise women who make a difference to everyday New Zealanders' lives. The Awards were first made in 2013 and were initially sponsored by Westpac Bank. In 2016, Stuff NZ became a joint sponsor.

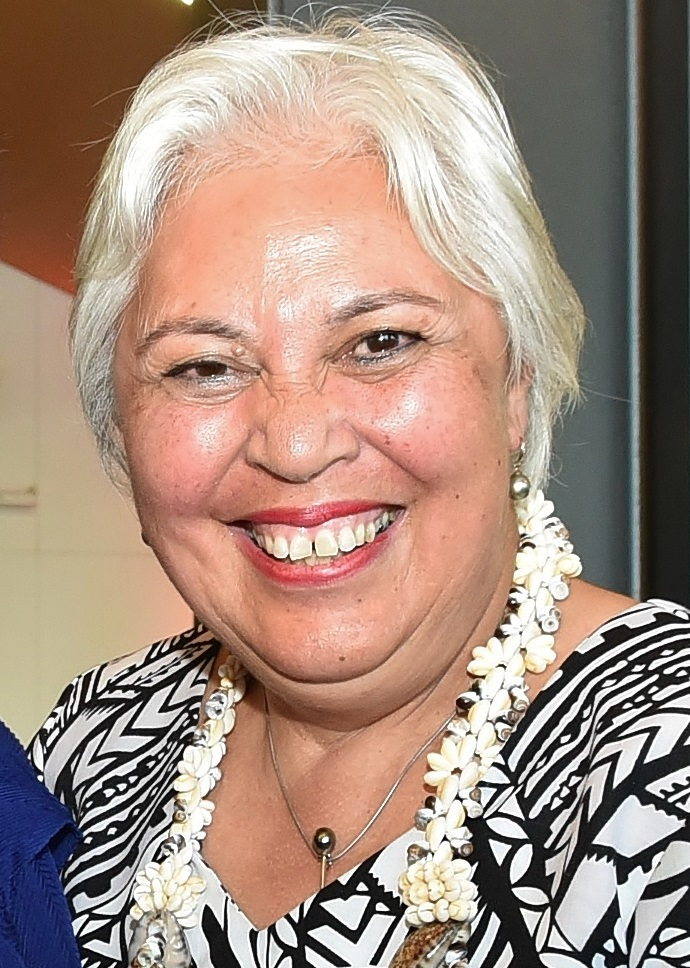
Luamanuvao Dame Winnie Laban, winner of the 2020 Women of Influence Lifetime Achievement Award

Nominations are invited from the public. A panel selects finalists in each category, who are invited to an awards dinner at the Aotea Centre in Auckland where the recipients are announced. In 2021 the awards dinner was not held due to the COVID-19 pandemic.

== Categories ==
The Awards were initially presented in seven categories; additional categories have since been introduced and as of 2020 the Awards are made in ten categories: Board and Management, Business Enterprise, Innovation and Science, Young Leader, Arts and Culture, Public Policy, Community and Not-for-profit, Diversity, Global and Rural. In addition, there is a Supreme Award, which is awarded each year, and a Lifetime Achievement Award, which has been awarded four times.

The category Innovation and Science was titled Science, Health and Innovation until 2019. In 2021 it was renamed Innovation, Science and Health. The category Young Leader was titled Emerging Leader in 2013 and 2014. The category Arts and Culture was titled Arts in 2013 and 2014. The category Community and Not-for-Profit was titled Community and Social in 2013, Community in 2014 and Community Hero in 2021.

The category Social Enterprise has been awarded once, in 2014. The category Local and Regional has been awarded twice, in 2013 and in 2014.

In 2021, the category Global was not awarded, a category Environment was added and the category Rural was renamed Primary Industries.

== Judges ==
Dame Silvia Cartwright is the head of the judging panel. On the 2020 panel with her were Sir John Kirwan, Vanisa Dhiru, Abbie Reynolds, Sinead Boucher and Gina Dellabarca. In 2021 Francene Wineti replaced Sir John Kirwan on the panel.

== Recipients ==
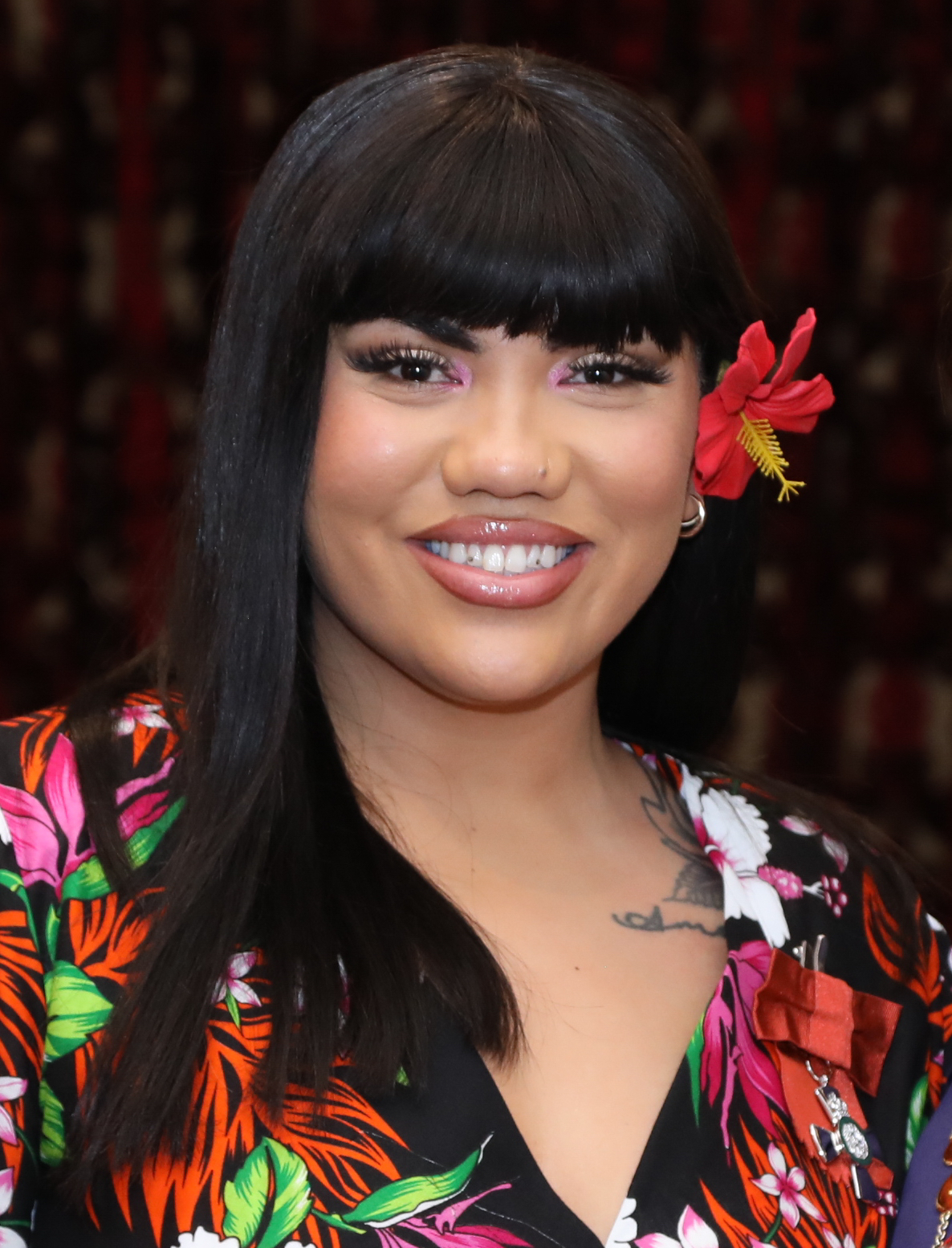
Parris Goebel, winner of the 2015 Young Leader Award and the 2020 Arts and Culture Award

Year	Category	Recipient	Notes
2021	Supreme Woman of Influence	Bronwyn Hayward, expert on sustainability, climate change and youth	
2021	Lifetime Achievement	Dame Silvia Cartwright, New Zealand's first female High Court judge and second female Governor-General	
2021	Board and Management	Cassandra Crowley, CEO of Te Arawa Management Limited	
2021	Business Enterprise	Jessie Wong, director of Yu Mei	
2021	Innovation, Science and Health	Bev Lawton, founder and director of Centre for Women's Health Research – Te Tātai Hauora o Hine	
2021	Young Leader	Kate Gatfield-Jeffries, co-founder of Young Women in Business and Law mentoring groups	
2021	Arts and Culture	Qiane Matata-Sipu, founder and creator of NUKU	
2021	Public Policy	Melanie Mark-Shadbolt, Deputy Secretary Māori Rights and Interests, Ministry for the Environment	
2021	Diversity	Dana Youngman, television executive	
2021	Community Hero	Bernadette Pinnell, founder of Compass Housing Services	
2021	Primary Industries	Tia Potae, Whānau Ora navigator at Tokomairiro Waiora	
2021	Environment	Bronwyn Hayward	

Year	Category	Recipient	Notes
2020	Supreme Woman of Influence	Siouxsie Wiles, microbiologist and leading COVID-19 commentator	
2020	Lifetime Achievement	Luamanuvao Dame Winnie Laban, New Zealand's first female MP of Pacific Island descent	
2020	Board and Management	Dame Alison Paterson, businesswoman and company director	
2020	Business Enterprise	Sonya Williams and Brooke Roberts, co-founders of Sharesies	
2020	Innovation and Science	Siouxsie Wiles	
2020	Young Leader	Aigagalefili Fepulea'i Tapua'i, climate change and social equality campaigner	
2020	Arts and Culture	Parris Goebel, choreographer and dancer	
2020	Public Policy	Una Jagose, New Zealand Solicitor-General	
2020	Community and Not-for-Profit	Ranjna Patel, domestic violence campaigner	
2020	Diversity	Tupe Solomon-Tanoa'i, diplomat	
2020	Global	Jane Kelsey, lawyer and political scientist	
2020	Rural	Trish Fraser, soil scientist	

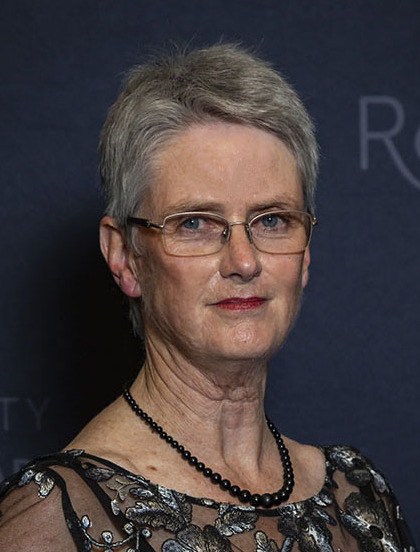
Dame Jane Harding, winner of the 2019 Supreme Woman of Influence Award

Year	Category	Recipient	Notes
2019	Supreme Woman of Influence	Dame Jane Harding, medical researcher	
2019	Board and Management	Abbie Reynolds, sustainable business leader	
2019	Business Enterprise	Brianne West, sustainable beauty entrepreneur and founder of Ethique	
2019	Innovation and Science	Dame Jane Harding	
2019	Young Leader	Annika Andresen, marine conservationist	
2019	Arts and Culture	Jennifer Ward-Lealand, actress	
2019	Public Policy	Debbie Sorensen, public health leader	
2019	Community and Not-for-Profit	Swanie Nelson, community organiser	
2019	Diversity	Tapu Misa, journalist	
2019	Global	Anne-Marie Brady, political scientist	
2019	Rural	Gina Mohi, environmental planner	

Year	Category	Recipient	Notes
2018	Supreme Woman of Influence	Jackie Clark, of The Aunties, a charity working with domestic violence survivors in South Auckland	
2018	Lifetime Achievement	Theresa Gattung, businesswoman and former chief executive of Telecom New Zealand	
2018	Board and Management	Farah Palmer, former captain of New Zealand's women's rugby union team, the Black Ferns	
2018	Business Enterprise	Angie Judge, technology entrepreneur	
2018	Science, Health and Innovation	Wendy Larner, president of the Royal Society Te Apārangi	
2018	Young Leader	Maddison McQueen-Davies, founder of Share a Pair NZ	
2018	Arts and Culture	Miranda Harcourt, actress	
2018	Public Policy	Charlotte Korte, for creating Mesh Down Under	
2018	Community and Not-for-Profit	Jackie Clark	
2018	Diversity	Sarah Lang, founder of Women's Infrastructure Network	
2018	Global	Sarah Vrede	
2018	Rural	Rebecca Keoghan	

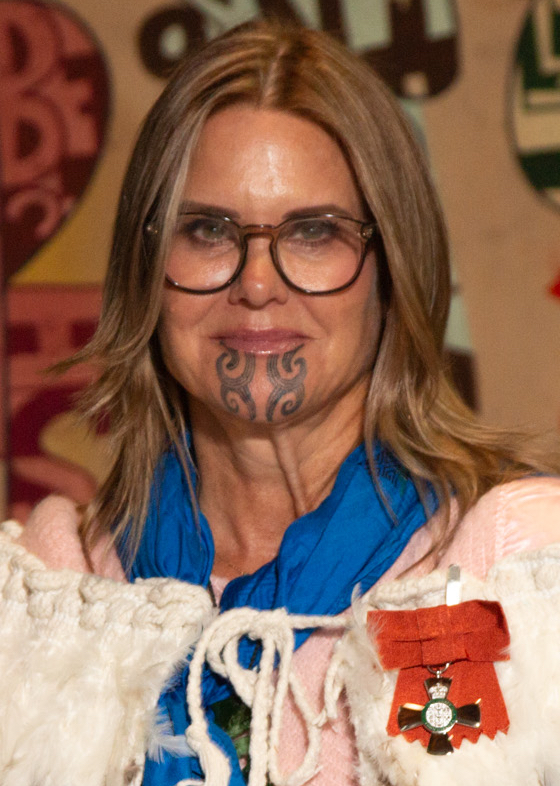
Hinemoa Elder, winner of the 2017 Science, Health and Innovation Award

Year	Category	Recipient	Notes
2017	Supreme Woman of Influence	Cecilia Robinson, founder of My Food Bag	
2017	Lifetime Achievement	Helen Clark, former Prime Minister of New Zealand	
2017	Board and Management	Anne-Maree O'Connor, investment banker	
2017	Business Enterprise	Cecilia Robinson	
2017	Science, Health and Innovation	Hinemoa Elder, youth forensic psychiatrist	
2017	Young Leader	Sharnay Cocup, founder of the Taupiri Youth Group Trust	
2017	Arts and Culture	Denise L'Estrange-Corbet, fashion designer	
2017	Public Policy	Rebecca Kitteridge, director of the New Zealand Security Intelligence Service	
2017	Community and Not-for-Profit	Lisa King, founder of school lunch provider Eat My Lunch	
2017	Diversity	Minnie Baragwanath, founder of Be. Accessible, a social change agency focusing on changing how New Zealanders view accessibility	
2017	Global	Siân Simpson	
2017	Rural	Nicola Shadbolt, agricultural businesswoman	

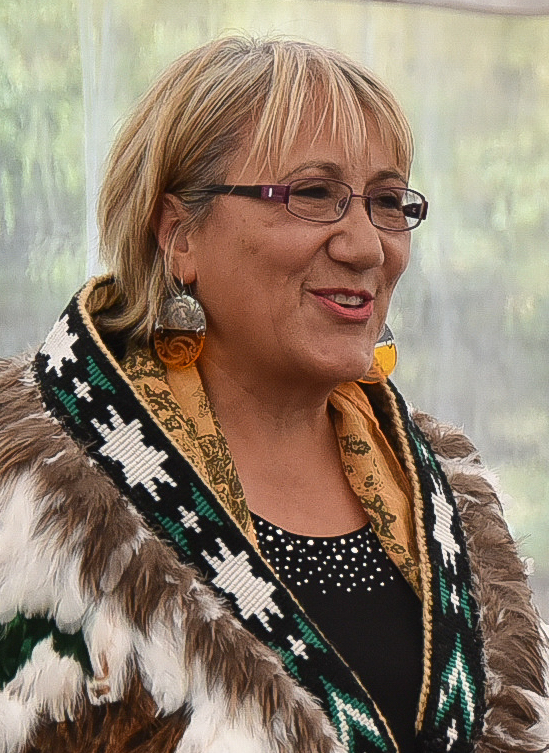
Mavis Mullins, winner of the 2016 Rural Award

Year	Category	Recipient	Notes
2016	Supreme Woman of Influence	Helen Robinson, businesswoman	
2016	Lifetime Achievement	Dame Rosanne Meo, businesswoman	
2016	Board and Management	Helen Robinson	
2016	Business Enterprise	Lisa King, founder of school lunch provider Eat My Lunch	
2016	Science, Health and Innovation	Michelle Dickinson, nanotechnologist and science educator	
2016	Young Leader	Alexia Hilbertidou, founder of GirlBoss NZ	
2016	Arts and Culture	Gaylene Preston, filmwriter, director and producer	
2016	Public Policy	Naomi Ferguson, Commissioner of Inland Revenue	
2016	Community and Not-for-Profit	Catriona Williams, founder of Catwalk Trust	
2016	Diversity	Sue Kedgley, Wellington politician	
2016	Global	Lyn Provost, Auditor-General of New Zealand	
2016	Rural	Mavis Mullins	

Year	Category	Recipient	Notes
2015	Supreme Woman of Influence	Joan Withers, for her work campaigning for more women on boards and in business	
2015	Board and Management	Joan Withers	
2015	Business Enterprise	Linda Jenkinson, entrepreneur	
2015	Science, Health and Innovation	Frances Valintine, education futurist	
2015	Young Leader	Parris Goebel, choreographer and dancer	
2015	Arts and Culture	Victoria Spackman, creative director and business executive	
2015	Public Policy	Vicky Robertson, Chief Executive of the Ministry for the Environment and Secretary for the Environment	
2015	Community and N	Stacey Shortall, volunteer lawyer in women's prisons	
2015	Diversity	Colonel Karyn Thompson, the most senior woman in the New Zealand Defence Force	
2015	Global	Dame Judith Mayhew Jonas, lawyer	
2015	Rural	Katie Milne, first woman president of Federated Farmers	

Year	Category	Recipient	Notes
2014	Supreme Woman of Influence	Lesley Elliott, for her work at the Sophie Elliott Foundation, which educates New Zealanders on healthy relationships	
2014	Board and Management	Traci Houpapa, company director	
2014	Business Enterprise	Dame Wendy Pye, publisher	
2014	Science, Health and Innovation	Dame Margaret Brimble, chemist	
2014	Emerging Leader	Parris Goebel, choreographer and dancer	
2014	Arts	Shona McCullagh, choreographer and founding director of the New Zealand Dance Company	
2014	Community	Lesley Elliott	
2014	Local and Regional	Kerry Prendergast, Wellington politician	
2014	Social Enterprise	Jo-anne Wilkinson and Anne Miles	

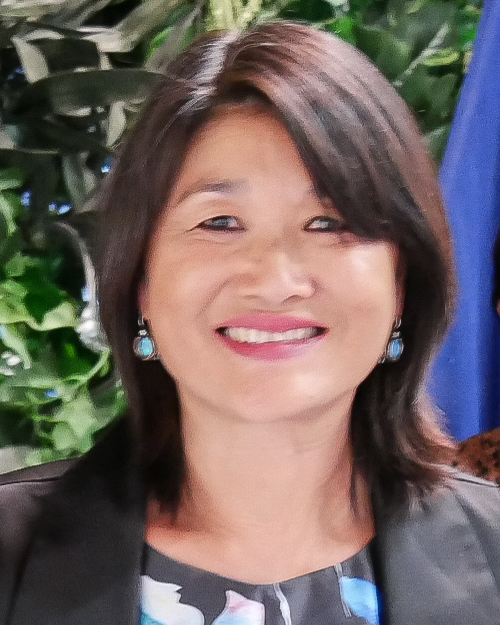
Mai Chen, winner of the 2013 Business Enterprise Award

Year	Category	Recipient	Notes
2013	Supreme Woman of Influence	Dame Therese Walsh, chief operating officer for the 2011 Rugby World Cup	
2013	Board and Management	Dame Therese Walsh	
2013	Business Enterprise	Mai Chen, constitutional and administrative lawyer	
2013	Science, Health and Innovation	Marilyn Waring, public policy scholar	
2013	Emerging Leader	Mahsa Mohaghegh, founder of women's networking group She Sharp	
2013	Arts	Victoria Spackman, creative director and business executive	
2013	Community and Social	Emeline Afeaki-Mafile'o, community leader	
2013	Local and Regional	Fran Wilde, Wellington politician	

== See also ==
- List of awards honoring women
