= Brooke Roberts (entrepreneur) =

New Zealand entrepreneur

- Born: Brooke Tania Anderson; Manurewa, Auckland, New Zealand
- Education: Victoria University of Wellington and Massey University
- Occupations: Entrepreneur and businesswoman
- Known for: Co-founder of Sharesies
- Partner: Leighton Roberts
- Children: 2

Brooke Tania Roberts (née Anderson) is a New Zealand entrepreneur and businesswoman. She is a co-founder of the micro-investing platform Sharesies. Roberts was the joint winner of the 2020 New Zealand Women of Influence Award in the Business Enterprise section.

== Early life and education ==
Roberts grew up in the Auckland suburb of Manurewa, in Mount Maunganui, and the United States, and attended high school at Woodford House in Havelock North. She completed a bachelor of commerce and administration at Victoria University and a master's in finance at Massey University.

== Career ==
She started her career in Wellington, working in finance, product, and marketing roles at AJ Park, Kiwibank and Xero.

In 2017, Roberts and six others co-founded Sharesies as an investment platform for New Zealanders.

== Recognition ==
In 2020, Roberts received a Distinguished Young Alumni Award from Massey University.
