= Shortall (name) =

Shortall is a surname. Notable people with the surname include:

- Brian Shortall, Laois footballer
- James Shortall (born 1979), New Zealand tennisman
- Mary Shortall (born 1958), Canadian politician
- Róisín Shortall (born 1954), Irish politician
- Stacey Shortall, New Zealand lawyer
- Andy Shortall, Dublin soccer player
