= Acorns (company) =

American financial technology company

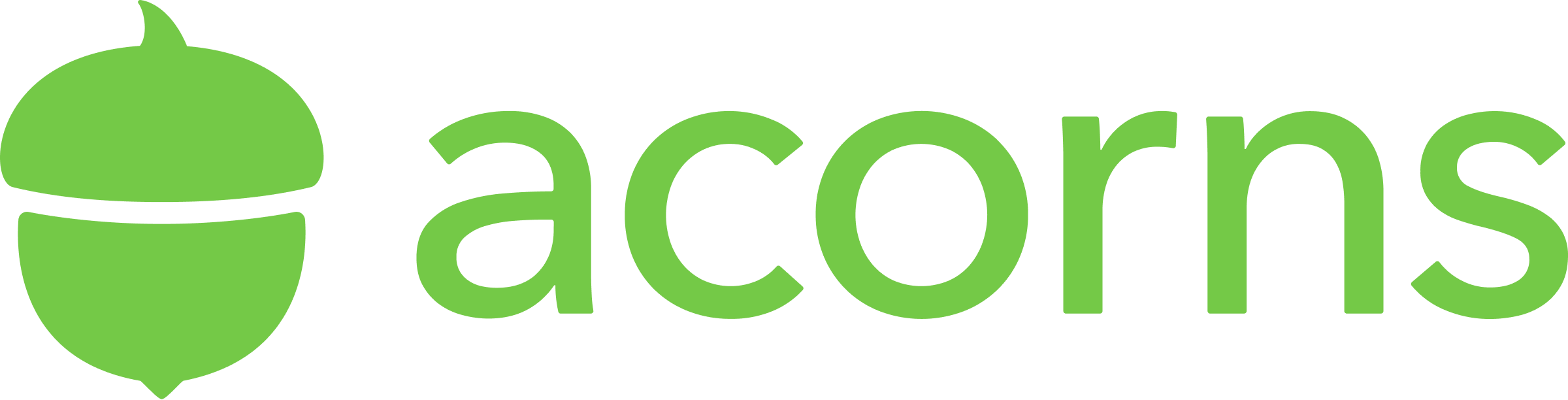
- Website type: Private
- Headquarters: Irvine, California
- Key people: Noah Kerner (CEO)
- Industry: Financial services
- Products: Investment management, investment portfolios, stock portfolios, stock trading
- Website: www.acorns.com
- Launched: 2012; 14 years ago

Acorns is an American financial technology and financial services company based in Irvine, California. It operates a micro-investing platform offering automated investment portfolios.

Founded in 2012, Acorns expanded beyond automated investing to include taxable investment accounts and individual retirement accounts (IRAs). In the early 2020s, the company further broadened its product offerings through acquisitions in retirement savings, debt management, and consumer finance.

According to Fortune's Impact 20 list, Acorns had 8.2 million customers in 2020. In 2022, the company's total assets under management exceeded $6.2 billion.

== History ==
The company was formed in 2012 by father and son duo Walter Wemple Cruttenden III and Jeffrey James Cruttenden to make investing easier and more accessible to new investors. The portfolio options a user can select from were designed in partnership with paid advisor Harry Markowitz, a Nobel laureate. Acorns launched in 2014 with an app for iOS and Android devices. That year, Noah Kerner, an early investor in the company and a three-time entrepreneur, became chief executive officer.

Since its inception, the platform has expanded to include checking account services and individual retirement account (IRA) products. This was made possible following an acquisition of Portland, Oregon fintech retirement startup, Vault.

Following Acorns’s acquisition of Portland, Oregon-based fintech startup Vault in late 2017, the platform expanded to include individual retirement account (IRA) products. Vault’s retirement savings technology supported the launch of Acorns’ IRA offering, branded Acorns Later.

In 2018, behavioral economist Shlomo Benartzi was appointed chair of a behavioral economics committee at Acorns, working on an initiative termed the Money Lab to conduct field experiments focused on consumer spending.

Since its founding, the company has raised approximately $100 million in venture capital funding. As of August 2019, notable investors in Acorns included Jennifer Lopez, Alex Rodriguez, Bono, Ashton Kutcher and Kevin Durant. PayPal, BlackRock, and NBCUniversal also have a stake in the company.

In 2021, Acorns planned to go public through a merger with a blank-check company Pioneer Merger Corp. These plans were canceled in January 2022, citing market conditions. The same year, the company acquired Harvest Platform, a debt-reduction fintech, and later Pillar, an AI start-up focused on student loan management.

In 2023, Acorns acquired GoHenry and its European subsidiary Pixpay, expanding its offering to financial education and debit cards.

== Products and services ==
Acorns’ investment portfolios are composed of passively managed exchange-traded funds (ETFs), primarily from large asset managers such as Vanguard and BlackRock, and are allocated according to users’ stated risk tolerance.

In 2021, Acorns expanded its investment offering by introducing customizable portfolio options, allowing users to add individual stocks or ETFs to their portfolios, marking a shift toward more active user engagement alongside its automated model.

The company’s subscription model and its impact on users with small account balances have been discussed within the financial advisory industry, with critics noting the potentially high effective cost for small investors and the company emphasizing the broader scope of its services.

== Regulatory action ==
In 2017, Acorns was censured and fined by the Financial Industry Regulatory Authority for failing to maintain proper customer records.

== See also ==
- Stash
