= Afeaki =

Afeaki is a Tongan surname. Notable people with the surname include:

- Ben Afeaki (born 1988), New Zealand rugby union player
- Inoke Afeaki (born 1973), Tongan rugby union player
- Stanley Afeaki (born 1978), New Zealand-born Tongan rugby union player

== See also ==
- Emeline Afeaki-Mafile'o, New Zealand activist
