= Francesco Giroldini =

Italian director

- Occupation(s): Director, Writer, Artist
- Known for: Receiving Young Director Award
- Notable work: The Monk and The Monkey, Animation Tag Attack

Francesco Giroldini is an Italian director, writer and artist working in the animation industry.

He is well known along with Brendan Carroll for his role as writer and director of the short films The Monk and The Monkey (2010) and Animation Tag Attack (2011).

His credits also include Ferdinand, Ice Age: Collision Course, Kung Fu Panda 2, Rio 2, Madagascar 3, The Peanuts Movie, Mr. Peabody and Sherman, Puss in Boots, Rise of the Guardians and Megamind, among others.

== Life and career ==
Giroldini was born in Milan, Italy and graduated Ringling College of Art and Design in 2010, majoring in Computer animation.

In 2010 he joined DreamWorks Animation and in 2013 he joined Blue Sky Studios.

Giroldini's first short film, The Monk and The Monkey, was released in 2010 and was featured at SIGGRAPH as well as Siggraph Asia. Giroldini's second short film, Animation Tag Attack, was released in 2011 and was featured at the Annecy Film Festival. Both short films received wide praise and critical acclaim.

In 2015 Giroldini joined the production for the animated short film Mila as a Lighting Supervisor.

In 2016 Mila was successfully crowd-funded, raising over $60,000 on Indiegogo.

== Filmography ==
- The Monk and The Monkey
- Animation Tag Attack
- Megamind
- Megamind: The Button of Doom
- Kung Fu Panda 2
- Night of the Living Carrots
- Puss in Boots
- Madagascar 3: Europe's Most Wanted
- Rise of the Guardians
- Mr. Peabody & Sherman
- Rio 2
- The Peanuts Movie
- Ice Age: Collision Course
- Mila
- Ferdinand
- Nimona

== Awards and achievements ==
Giroldini has received many awards and honors for his work, which was featured at SIGGRAPH, Siggraph Asia and Annecy alongside work from established studios such as Blizzard Entertainment, Passion Pictures, Digic Pictures and Platige Image.

His work has been featured on some of the top CG magazines in the world such as 3Dtotal, Stash, Cartoon Brew and CGW.

His awards include:

- The Film Skillet – Finalist, Animation Category – The Monk and the Monkey (2013)
- Annecy International Animation Film Festival – Official Selection – Animation Tag Attack (2013)
- Toronto Animation Arts Festival International – Official Selection – Animation Tag Attack (2013)
- Tokyo Anime Award – Winner, General Category – Animation Tag Attack (2013)
- International Festival of Contemporary Animation and Media Art LINOLEUM – Second Prize – Animation Tag Attack (2012)
- The Danish Animation Awards – Talent of the Year – Animation Tag Attack (2012)
- International Festival of Documentary and Short Film in Bilbao – The Golden MIKELDI – Animation Tag Attack (2012)
- Webcuts – Best Collaborative Project – Animation Tag Attack (2011)
- Malta Film Festival – Winner, Best Foreign Animation Category – The Monk and the Monkey (2011)
- Siggraph – Computer Animation Festival Highlight – The Monk and the Monkey (2010)
- Soul 4 Reel – Best of Show – The Monk and the Monkey (2010)
- Siggraph Asia – Computer Animation Festival Highlight – The Monk and the Monkey (2010)
- Bang Awards – Winner, General Category – The Monk and the Monkey (2010)
- Motion TV – Winner, General Category – The Monk and the Monkey (2010)
