= Victoria Spackman =

New Zealand lawyer

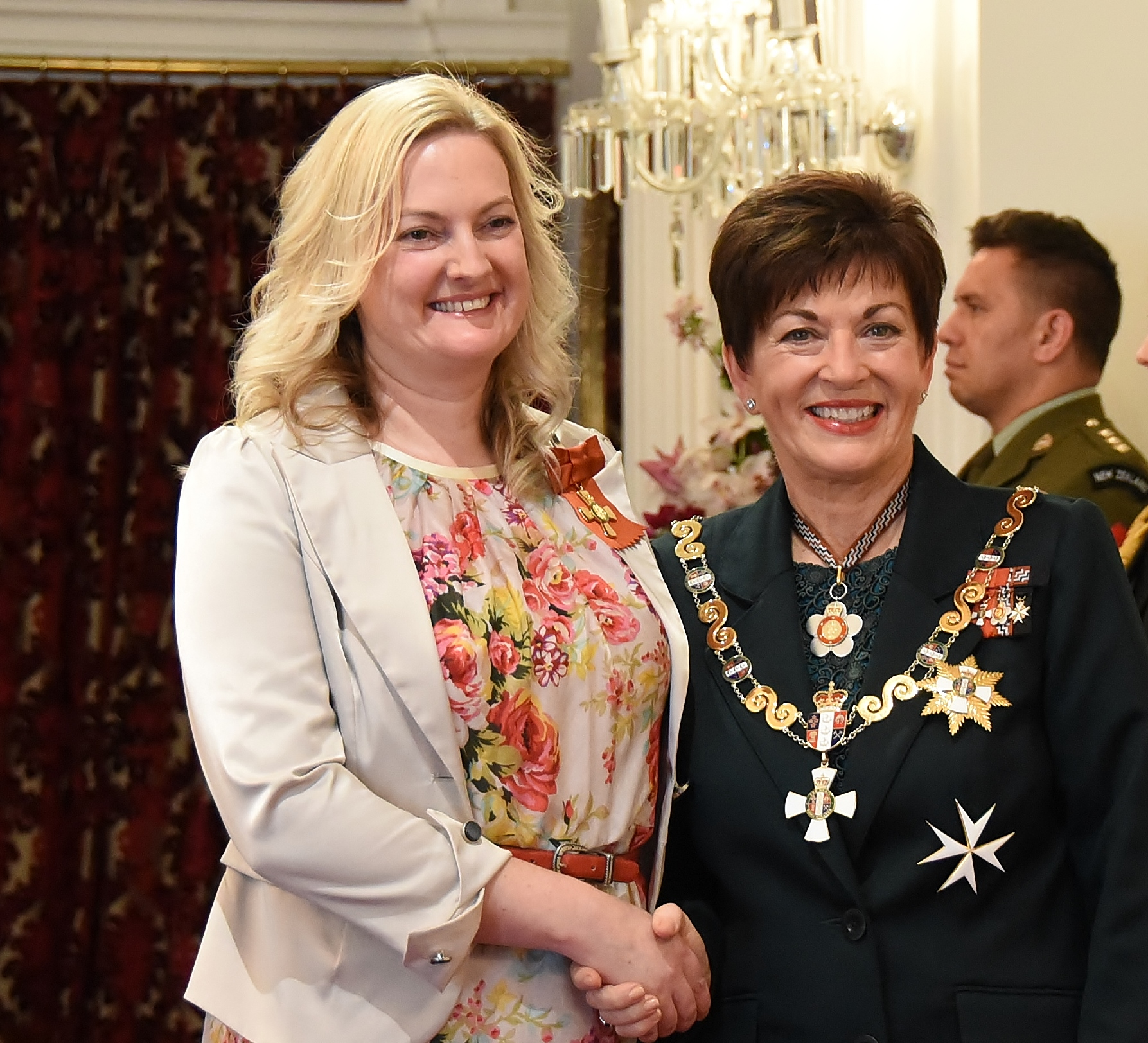
Spackman (left) in 2016, after her investiture as an Officer of the New Zealand Order of Merit by the governor-general, Dame Patsy Reddy

Victoria Ursula Spackman ONZM is a New Zealand creative director and business executive.

== Life ==
Spackman grew up in Wellington and London. She attended Victoria University of Wellington and graduated with degrees in law and arts, majoring in languages, film and theatre. In the late 1990s, she worked on numerous Fringe Festival plays as a producer and director, and in 2002 she became chair of the board of BATS Theatre. She held the position until 2014, during which time she led the theatre's renovation and expansion.

Following graduation, Spackman practiced employment and litigation law in Auckland and Wellington, including the firms Cullen Law and Buddle Findlay. In 2003 she joined South Pacific Pictures as their legal and business affairs manager. In 2006 she served as a business advisor for Kura Productions and Australia's SLP Productions, both joint ventures with South Pacific Pictures. The same year she took her first executive producer role, on the high-profile New Zealand Idol television show. Spackman moved to production company Gibson Group at the end of 2006 as legal and business affairs manager, and also held executive producer roles for a number of productions. In 2012 she was appointed chief executive of the Gibson Group, and the following year she and two colleagues bought the company from founder Dave Gibson.

In 2017 Spackman was appointed director creative at Te Auaha, a joint educational venture between Weltec and Whitireia Polytechnics in Wellington due to open in 2018.

Spackman is on the board of Education New Zealand and a director of Australian copyright organisation Screenrights. She has also served on the board of the New Zealand screen industry organization, SPADA.

=== Recognition ===
In 2012, Spackman received the LexisNexis Private Sector In-House Lawyer of the Year Award. In 2015 she was awarded the Arts and Culture award in the New Zealand Women of Influence Awards. In the 2016 Queen's Birthday Honours, Spackman was appointed an Officer of the New Zealand Order of Merit for services to theatre, film and television.
