= Tapu Misa =

Pasifika NZ journalist

Tapu Misa is a Samoan-born New Zealand journalist specialising in Pacific Islands affairs. She is considered New Zealand's first Pasifika woman journalist.

== Biography ==
Misa was born in Samoa and raised in Wellington. She studied journalism on a course taught by Gary Wilson at Waiariki Institute of Technology aimed specifically at encouraging Māori and Pacific people into journalism. She and Wilson later worked together to establish the course in Manukau, Auckland. She has written for The New Zealand Herald, magazines More (now Next), North & South and Mana. She has also worked in radio, for National Radio. She was a member of the New Zealand Broadcasting Standards Authority for eight years.

In 2015 Misa and Wilson co-founded e-Tangata, a weekly online magazine which publishes writing by Māori and Pasifika writers. In 2017, Bridget Williams Books published a book of writing from the site.

=== Publications ===
- Misa, T., & Wilson, G. (2017). The best of e-Tangata.

=== Recognition ===
In 2019, Misa won the New Zealand Women of Influence Award for Diversity.
