= Anne-Maree O'Connor =

New Zealand investment banker

Anne-Maree O'Connor is a New Zealand investment banker. She has been Head of Sustainable Investment for the New Zealand Superannuation Fund since 2006. In 2017 she was ranked eighth among the world's most influential responsible investment specialists.

== Education ==
O'Connor studied for a Bachelor of Science degree at Massey University, followed by a masters in science degree at the University College of Wales. She also holds an Investment Management Certificate.

== Career ==
O'Connor has worked in corporate responsibility and responsible investment for a number of international fund management firms. In 2006 she returned to New Zealand and was appointed Head of Responsible Investment for the New Zealand Superannuation Fund.

In 2015 O'Connor was involved with the establishment of a Corporate Governance Forum in Wellington, and its inaugural chair. She also a member of the board of the Responsible Investment Association of Australasia.

== Awards ==
In 2017 O'Connor received the Board and Management Award at the New Zealand Women of Influence Awards.
