= Joan Withers =

New Zealand businesswoman

Dame Joan Withers DNZM
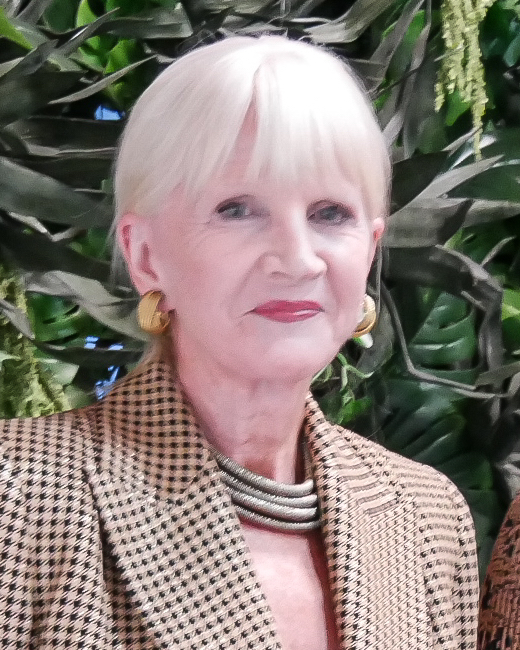
- Withers in 2020
- Born: Joan Blinkhorn; 1953 (age 72–73); Manchester, England
- Occupations: Business executive; professional director
- Spouse: Brian Withers
- Children: 1

Dame Joan Withers DNZM (née Blinkhorn; born 1953) is a New Zealand business executive and professional director. Currently the chair of the Warehouse Group, her previous roles include being deputy chair of the board of TVNZ, chair of Mercury Energy, and a member of the advisory board of the New Zealand Treasury. She has also been chief executive officer of Fairfax New Zealand and the Radio Network.

== Early life and family ==
Withers was born Joan Blinkhorn in Manchester, England, in 1953, the second of three daughters of Lilian and Jack Blinkhorn. The family moved to New Zealand in 1959, eventually settling in the Auckland suburb of Papatoetoe. A self-described rebellious teen, she left school aged 16, after gaining School Certificate, and found work at the Bank of New Zealand in Queen Street. When she was 19, she married Brian Withers, an electrician, whom she had met at a rugby club dance when she was 15 years old. The couple went on to have a son two years later. After marrying, Withers began writing restaurant reviews, "Out and About with Joan and Brian Withers", for her local newspaper, the South Auckland Gazette. Following the birth of her son, she worked from home, making jerseys on a knitting machine.

== Career ==
After her son started school, Withers returned to work outside the home, writing editorial copy and selling advertising at New Zealand News for nine years. In 1989, conscious that she had no tertiary qualifications, she undertook study for a Master of Business Administration degree at the University of Auckland. After graduating, she was appointed general manager of Radio i, and subsequently became the CEO of The Radio Network.

Withers left The Radio Network in 1997, becoming a professional director. She was appointed to the board of Auckland International Airport Limited in 1996. In August 2004, she was appointed to the Feltex board as its only female director just days before the company launched an IPO in New Zealand for its entire share capital. The $250 million issue was almost fully subscribed but the company failed after about two years with all share capital lost. Withers had resigned from the board in June 2005, after it first announced a profit forecast downgrade.

Between 2005 and 2009, Withers was CEO of Fairfax New Zealand. In August 2009, she was appointed to the board of state-owned energy company Mighty River Power, becoming chairwoman within weeks. In October 2009, she was appointed to the TVNZ board, being named deputy chairwoman in August 2010.

She has also been appointed to Sir Stephen Tindall's Tindall Foundation as a trustee.

== Honours and awards ==
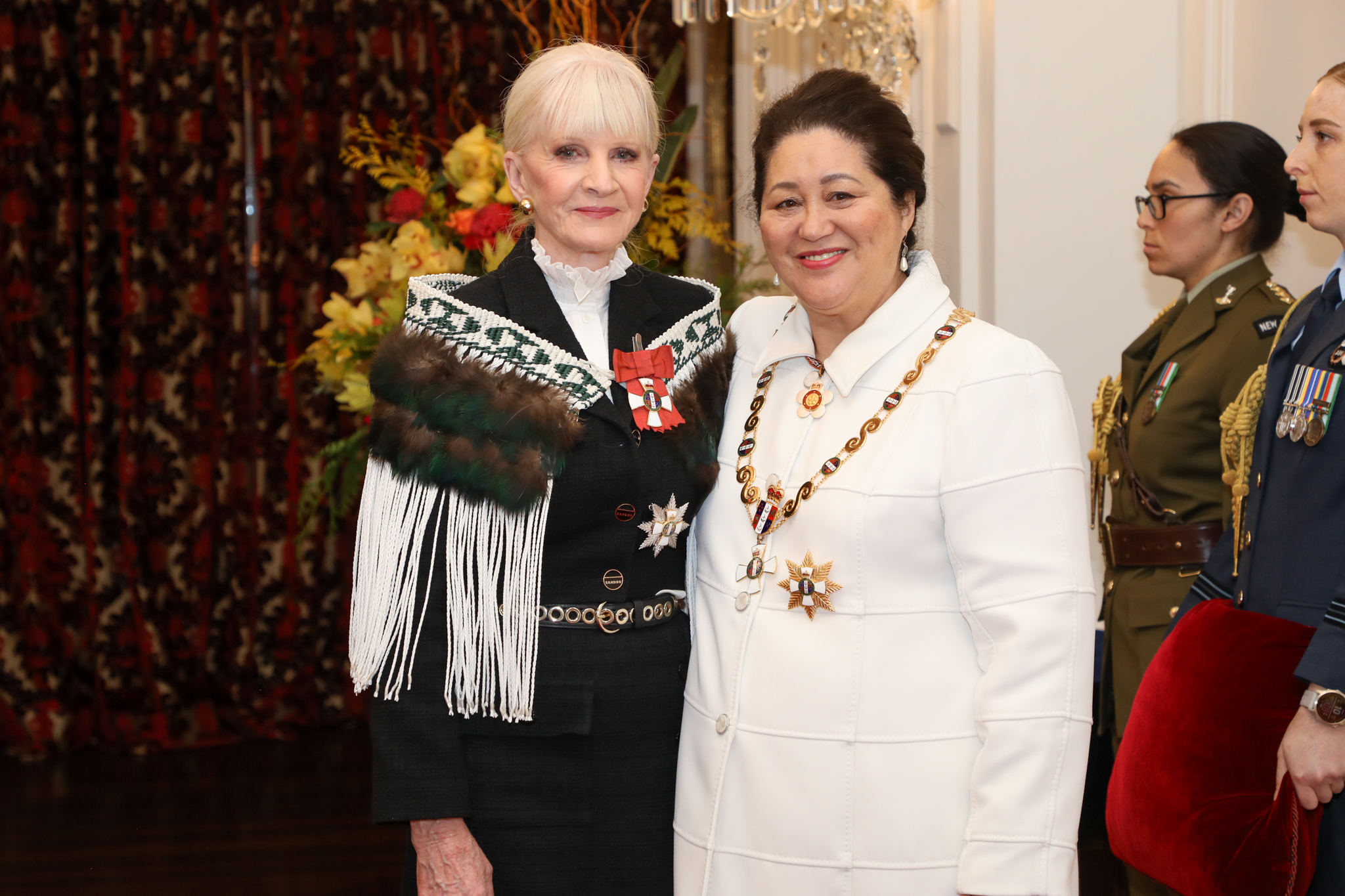
Withers (left), after her investiture as a Dame Companion of the New Zealand Order of Merit by the governor-general, Dame Cindy Kiro, at Government House, Wellington, on 4 September 2024

Withers has won a number of business awards, including being named the 2015 Supreme Woman of Influence in the New Zealand Women of Influence Awards, the New Zealand Shareholder Association's Beacon Award for 2014, and the University of Auckland Bright Lights Distinguished Alumni award in 2015.

In the 2024 King's Birthday Honours, Withers was appointed a Dame Companion of the New Zealand Order of Merit, for services to business, governance and women.

In 2025, Withers was inducted into the New Zealand Business Hall of Fame, in recognition of her contributions to business and governance.
