= Minnie Baragwanath =

New Zealand activist

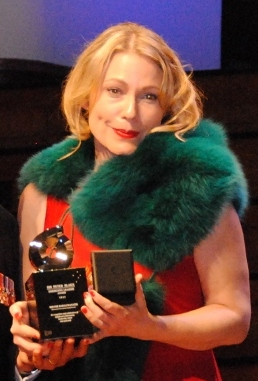
Baragwanath receiving the Blake Leader Award

Amanda Jane "Minnie" Baragwanath MNZM is a disability advocate from New Zealand. In 2011, she founded Be. Accessible, a social enterprise which aims to make New Zealand accessible and inclusive for all people with disabilities.

== Biography ==
Baragwanath grew up in Palmerston North. When she was 14 years old, she was diagnosed with Stargardt disease, an incurable disease of the eyes which caused her to lose her sight. Baragwanath studied at Massey University and completed a bachelor's degree in English literature, a bachelor of communication studies and a graduate diploma in economic development.

In 2011, Baragwanath founded Be. Accessible, and Be. Leadership as a subproject. Be. Leadership focused on providing leadership development programmes for disabled New Zealanders. In 2019 she renamed the organisation Be. Lab and established the Centre of Possibility at Auckland University of Technology (AUT). At the Centre of Possibility Baragwanath works with AUT researchers and academics in the field of possibility design and innovation.

=== Recognition ===
In 2013, Baragwanath received the Sir Peter Blake Leadership Award and in 2014 she was made a member of the New Zealand Order of Merit. In 2017 she received the New Zealand Women of Influence Award for Diversity. In 2019 she was named by Zonta International as one of 100 Women of Achievement in New Zealand for her leadership and advocacy for social change.
