= Sonya Williams =

New Zealand entrepreneur

- Born: Levin, New Zealand
- Education: Victoria University of Wellington
- Occupations: Entrepreneur and businesswoman
- Known for: Co-founder of Sharesies
- Partner: Ben Crotty

Sonya Williams is a New Zealand entrepreneur and businesswoman.

Williams is a co-founder of the micro-investing platform Sharesies and the company's chief executive for product and marketing. Williams was the joint winner of the 2020 New Zealand Women of Influence Award in the Business Enterprise section.

Williams is a graduate of Victoria University of Wellington.
