= Rebecca Keoghan =

New Zealand dairy farmer and professional company director

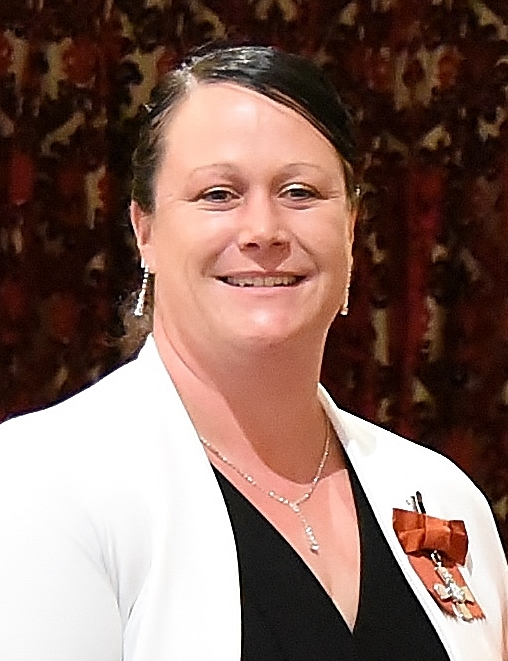
Keoghan in 2017

Rebecca Louise Keoghan MNZM is a New Zealand dairy farmer and professional company director.

== Biography ==
Keoghan completed a degree in Medical Laboratory Science from the University of Otago, and also holds diplomas in advanced business management and leadership. She has served on the boards of Fire and Emergency New Zealand, Future Focussed Animal Evaluation, Timaru District Holdings, Alpine Energy, Tai Poutini Polytechnic, Buller Holdings, Westland Milk Products, Judicial Control Authority, Forest Growth Holdings and Invercargill City Forests.

Keoghan began her career in medical science in Invercargill, then spent some time working in the UK, Australia before returning to New Zealand, shifting to the West Coast and commenced dairy farming with her husband. Keoghan left her combined careers in executive roles and governance to focus solely on adding value in the governance field in 2019.

=== Recognition ===
In 2016, Keoghan won Fonterra Dairy Woman of the Year. In the 2017 Queen's Birthday Honours, she was appointed a Member of the New Zealand Order of Merit, for services to business, particularly the dairy industry, and in 2018 she received the New Zealand Woman of Influence Award in the rural category.
