= Mahsa Mohaghegh =

Iranian-born New Zealand computer engineer

Mahsa McCauley (Mohaghegh)
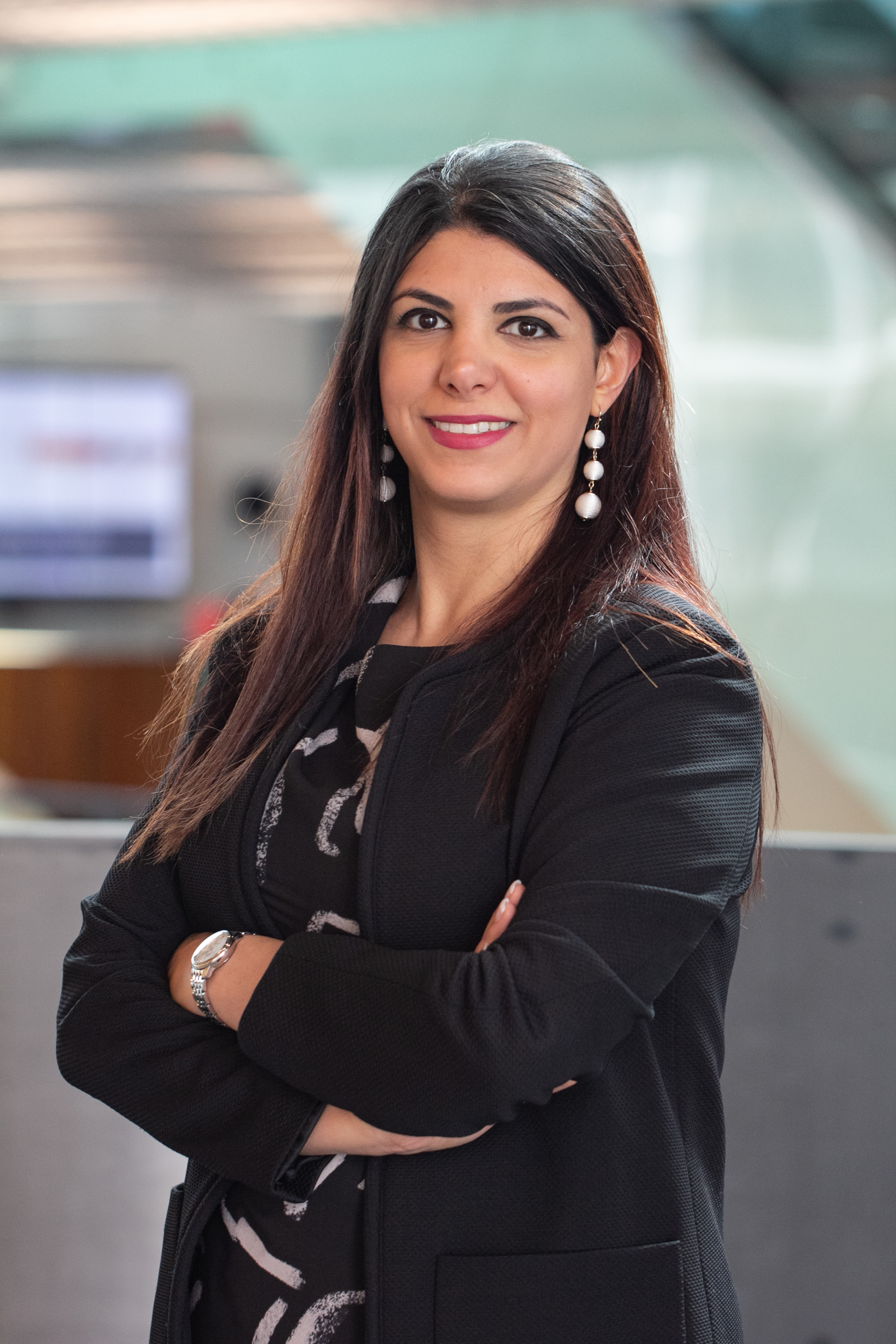
- Other name: McCauley
- Education: Massey University
- Occupations: Director, Engineer, Scientist at Auckland University of Technology
- Known for: Founder of She Sharp & Director of Women in Technology at AUT

Mahsa Mohaghegh (McCauley) is an Iranian-born New Zealand computer engineer specialising in artificial intelligence and natural language processing. She is a professor of information technology and software engineering at Auckland University of Technology.

== Biography ==
Mohaghegh grew up in Iran. She completed a bachelor of computer engineering, and a masters in computer architecture, and in 2013 she completed a doctorate in computer engineering at Massey University. In February 2017 she was appointed a lecturer at Auckland University of Technology.

Since 2013 she has been involved with Google’s Computer Science for High Schools programme and runs workshops in Auckland.

Mohaghegh founded a women's networking group called She# (She Sharp) to encourage girls and young women to engage with digital industries.

=== Awards ===
In 2013 Mohaghegh won the Emerging Leader category at the New Zealand Women of Influence Awards. In 2018 she was one of ten finalists for the New Zealander of the Year Award and also won the Auckland University Of Technology Vice-Chancellor Diversity Award for the Faculty of Design and Creative Technologies.
