= Tupe Solomon-Tanoa'i =

New Zealand civil servant

- Awards: Diversity award

Academic background
- Education: University of Auckland

Academic work
- Institutions: Ministry of Foreign Affairs and Trade of New Zealand

Tupe Solomon-Tanoa'i is a New Zealand public servant and media producer. She is a board member of the Asia New Zealand Foundation, Philanthropy New Zealand and the Broadcasting Standards Authority, and in 2020 was the winner of the diversity category at the Women of Influence Awards.

== Early life and education ==
Solomon-Tanoa'i is of Samoan and Fijian heritage, and grew up in Māngere Bridge in Auckland. Her parents, Arthur and Maretta Solomon, established a private training establishment and were both appointed Officers of the New Zealand Order of Merit in 2015 for services to education and the Pacific community. She was educated at Baradene College, and studied languages and law at the University of Auckland, graduating with Bachelor of Arts and Bachelor of Law (Hons) degrees in 2006.

== Career ==
After university, Solomon-Tanoa'i joined the Ministry of Foreign Affairs and Trade, and spent two periods representing New Zealand in Taipei.

Since 2020, Solomon-Tanoa'i is the Chief Philanthropic Officer at the Michael & Suzanne Borrin Foundation, which was set up from a bequest by Judge Ian Borrin to support legal research, education and scholarship. She is also a member of the Asia New Zealand Foundation board, the Deputy Chair of the Board of Philanthropy New Zealand, and has been on the board of the Broadcasting Standards Authority since 2021.

With her husband, Solomon-Tanoa'i set up Poporazzi Productions, and wrote and produced a six-part web series about the struggles of a young Pasifika woman against unconscious bais in the workplace.

== Honours and awards ==
Solomon-Tanoa'i was the winner of the diversity category of the 2020 Women of Influence Awards, for her work "helping finance criminal justice and family law research [and as a] campaigner for cultural recognition and inclusion". In 2020, the University of Auckland included Solomon-Tanoa'i as one of their '40 under 40', a list of inspirational young alumni.

Solomon-Tanoa'i's father is from the village of Malaemalu in Samoa. In 2024 the village awarded her the chiefly title of Pulotu.
