= Naomi Ferguson =

British and New Zealand public servant

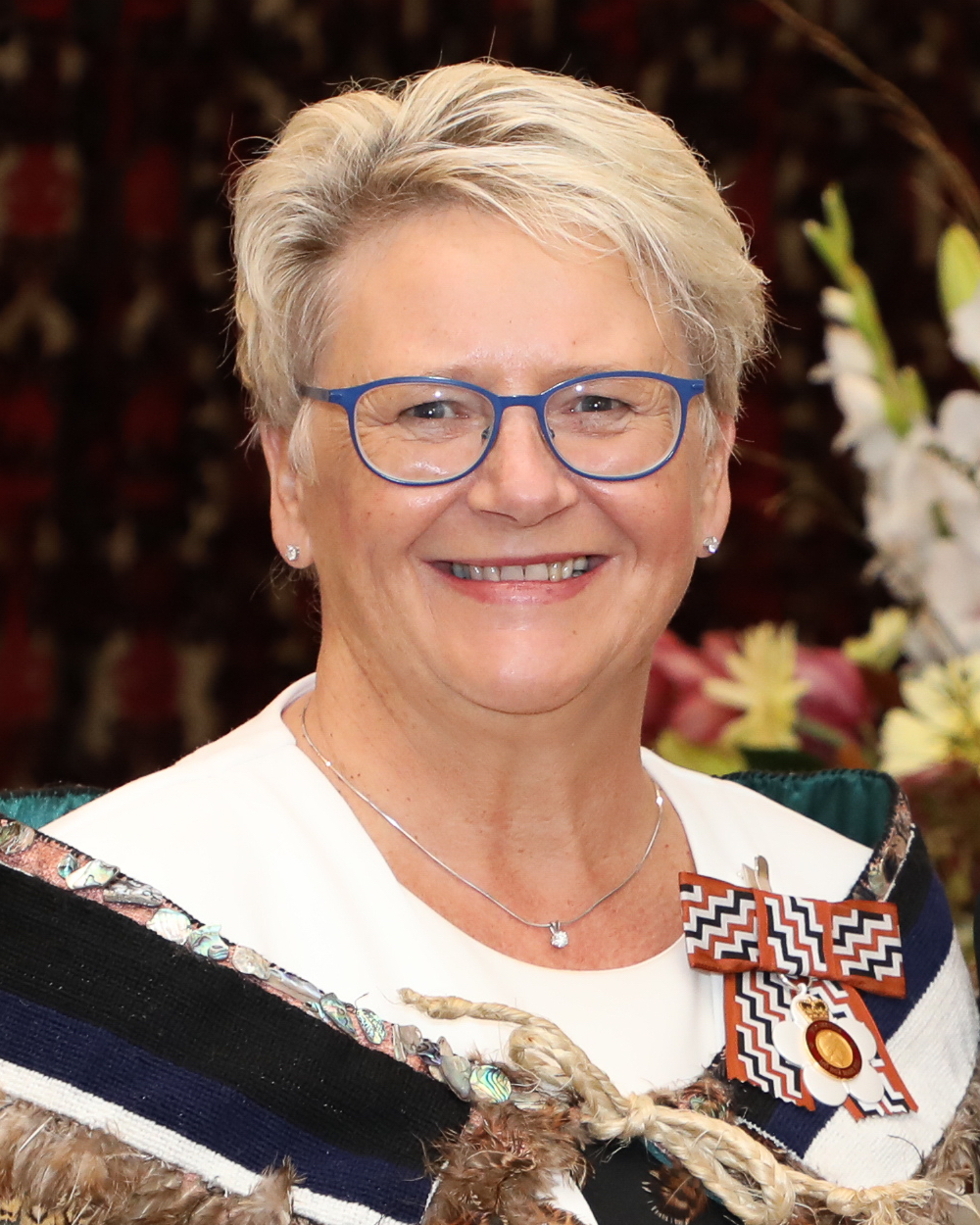
Ferguson in 2023

Naomi Patricia Ferguson QSO is a British and New Zealand public servant. She served as the commissioner and chief executive of the New Zealand Inland Revenue Department from 2012 to 2022.

== Early life ==
Ferguson was born in Belfast, Northern Ireland, and studied at the University of Glasgow, graduating with a Master of Arts in English Literature and Sociology.

== Career ==
On graduating, Ferguson joined Her Majesty's Revenue and Customs as a trainee tax inspector, followed by a short period working at Barclays Bank as the Human Resources, Restructuring and Development Director, and then returned to HMRC. She has also held the position of Regional Director for Inland Revenue in Northern Ireland.

In 2003, Ferguson was seconded to the New Zealand Inland Revenue Department as deputy commissioner for a period of three years. From 2006 to 2012 she was director, business customer and strategy for HMRC. In July 2012 she was appointed commissioner and chief executive of the New Zealand IRD, becoming the first woman to hold these positions. She left the roles in June 2022.

== Honours and awards ==
In 2016, Ferguson won the New Zealand Women of Influence Award in Public Policy. In the 2022 Queen's Birthday and Platinum Jubilee Honours, she was appointed a Companion of the Queen's Service Order, for services to the public service.
