= Dana Youngman =

New Zealand television executive

Dana Youngman is a New Zealand television and screen executive. A Samoan New Zealander, she won a 2021 New Zealand Women of Influence Awards.

== Biography ==
Youngman spent her early years in the Auckland suburb of Avondale. Her mother, Mata, had emigrated from Samoa to train as a nurse, and her Pākehā father, Brian, was a police officer. The family moved to Dannevirke in the Hawke's Bay region when she was at primary school. During high school, Youngman attended the National Youth Drama school and studied documentary-making with Bruno Lawrence and Chris Verberg. After leaving school she returned to Auckland to study television directing and production management at Unitec Institute of Technology.

While a tertiary student, Youngman had work experience placements at TVNZ, and on graduating was employed as a production co-ordinator. In 1997, she joined the morning television show Good Morning. She became one of New Zealand's youngest and first prime time television producers of Pasifika heritage in 2001 and in 2004, she was appointed head of the network's lifestyle unit and produced a number of drama, documentary and animated television shows until moving to Sky TV as an Entertainment Commissioner in 2019. After three years at Sky, Youngman was appointed strategic advisor to the chief executive at the New Zealand Film Commission.

Youngman has been nominated for television awards. In 2003, she was nominated with Lisa Pringle for the Best Lifestyle Series Award at the New Zealand Television Awards for Maggie's Garden Show. In 2019, she was nominated with Damon Fepulea'i for the Best Pasifika Programme Award and the Best Sports Programme Award for Life After Footy – Legends of the Pacific at the New Zealand Television Awards. Her commissioned series INSiDE won an International Emmy Award for Best Short-Form Series in 2021.

Youngman is one of three New Zealand members of the International Academy of Television Arts and Sciences. In 2021, she won the Diversity Award at the prestigious New Zealand Women of Influence Awards.

== Screenography ==
Year	Title	Role	Format
2023 2022	The Black Ferns, Wahine Toa	Network executive	Television
2023 2022	When Bob Came	Network executive	Television
2023 2022	Moko the World	Network executive	Television
2023 2022	The Casketeers	Network executive	Television
2023 2022	Caged, Kai Kara France	Network executive	Television
2023 2022	Family,Faith and Footy	Network executive	Television
2023 2022	Tagata Pasifika	Network executive	Television
2023 2022	A Living Hell, Apartment Disasters	Network executive	Television
2023 2022	Project Brave	Network executive	Television
2023 2022	Shepherdess	Network executive	Television
2023 2022	A Question of Justice	Network executive	Television
2023 2022	Raised by Refugees	Network executive	Television
2023 2022	The Food Crisis	Network executive	Television
2021	Teine Sā – The Ancient Ones	Network executive	Web series
2021	Inked	Network executive	Television
2021	JK's Japan	Network executive & Executive Producer	Television
2021	Designing Dreams	Network executive	Television
2021	A Mild Touch of Cancer	Network executive	Film
2020	Tales of the Moana	Creator, director and producer	Television
2020	SIS	Network executive	Television
2020	INSiDE	Network executive	Television
2020	This Could Go Anywhere	Executive producer	Television
2020	Living with the Boss	Writer	Television
2019	Legendary Polynesia	Creator, director and producer	Television
2018	Life After Footy: Legends of the Pacific	Creator and producer	Television
2016	Sidewalk Karaoke	Executive producer	Television
2015–2016	Kiwi Living	Director and producer	Television
2014–2017	Whānau Living	Creator and executive producer	Television
2014	The Art of the Architect	Creator and series producer	Television
2014	Real Pasifik	Producer	Television
2014	Fresh	Producer	Television
2010	Inside Nature's Giants – The Giant Squid	Line producer	Television
2010–2014	Annabel Langbein: The Free Range Cook	Creator, director and producer	Television
2008	Build Up To Beijing	Creator, director and producer	Television
2008	New Zealand's Got Talent	Writer, director and producer	Television
2007	A Taste of Home	Creator and producer	Television
2007	Are We There Yet?	Executive producer	Television
2006	New Zealand House and Garden	Creator, director and producer	Television
2006	New Zealand's Brainiest Kid	Development producer	Television
2005	Taste Takes Off – Beijing	Executive producer	Television
2005 and 2007	Dancing with the Stars	Executive producer	Television
2004 and 2007	Mucking In	Executive producer	Television
2004 and 2007	Good Morning	Executive producer	Television
2004	Ground Rules	Creator and executive producer	Television
2004	Tomb of the Unknown Warrior	Producer	Television
2004	Flipside	Executive producer	Television
2004	Hum	Producer	Television
2004	Country Calendar	Executive producer	Television
2004	Are We There Yet	Executive producer	Television
2004	HomeFront	Executive producer	Television
2004	Masterbuilder House of the Year	Executive producer	Television
2002	Angela D'Audney – A Tribute	Production manager	Television
2000	Maggie's Garden Show – Ellerslie Flower Show Special	Compilation director	Television
2000	United Travel Getaway	Associate producer	Television
1998–2003	Maggie's Garden Show	Director, producer and production manager	Television
