= Fonterra Dairy Woman of the Year =

Annual award in New Zealand

Fonterra Dairy Woman of the Year is an annual award presented by New Zealand dairy company Fonterra and not-for-profit organisation Dairy Women's Network to a woman who has made an outstanding contribution to the dairy industry. The selection panel is made up of five judges including representatives from Dairy Women's Network, Fonterra, Global Women, Ballance Agri-Nutrients and a previous recipient of the award.

== Recipients ==
Year	Recipient	Notes
2021	Belinda Price, Whanganui sharemilker	
2020	Ash-Leigh Campbell, technical farm manager at Ngāi Tahu Farming	
2019	Trish Rankin	
2018	Loshni Manikam	
2017	Jessie Chan-Dorman	
2016	Rebecca Keoghan	
2015	Katie Milne	
2014	Charmaine O'Shea	
2013	Justine Kidd	
2012	Barbara Kuriger	

== See also ==
- List of awards honoring women
