= Aigagalefili Fepulea'i Tapua'i =

Samoan-New Zealander climate change activist

Aigagalefili Fepulea'i Tapua'i (Samoan pronunciation: [aiŋaŋaˈlefili fepuˈleaʔi taˈpuaʔi]; born 2001 or 2002) is a Samoan-New Zealander poet, indigenous, and climate change activist. She is the daughter of former Samoan MP Seminare Fepulea’i.

== Biography ==
Fepulea'i Tapua'i was born in South Auckland in 2000 or 2001. She is the daughter of former Samoan MP Seminare Fepulea’i. She was educated at Aorere College, where she was head girl. In 2019 she organised Pasefika climate change group 4 Tha Kulture and participated in the 2019 climate strikes. The story of her climate activism is documented in the film High Tide Don’t Hide. In March 2020 she was selected to represent New Zealand at the Global Young Leaders Conference in New York City.

During the COVID-19 pandemic Tapua'i spoke out about racial inequality in education and how the pandemic had forced Pasefika students to leave school to support their families. During the 2020 election campaign she was invited to participate in the leader's debate.

In 2024, Tapua'i's poem Love in All Lifetimes was featured in an exhibition at Britomart. Also in 2024, as youth ambassador to the Pacific Leadership Forum, she presented to a Select Committee on the Restoring Citizenship Removed By Citizenship (Western Samoa) Act Bill. She has written in opposition to deep sea mining in the Pacific.

== Recognition ==
In November 2020 she was awarded the Young Leader award in the New Zealand Women of Influence Awards. In December 2020 she was awarded the supreme award for youth advocacy at the inaugural Pacific Cooperation Foundation Youth Leadership Awards. In 2021 she was nominated for the New Zealander of the Year Awards in the "local hero" category.
