= Qiane Matata-Sipu =

New Zealand writer, photographer and community worker

Qiane Matata-Sipu MNZM
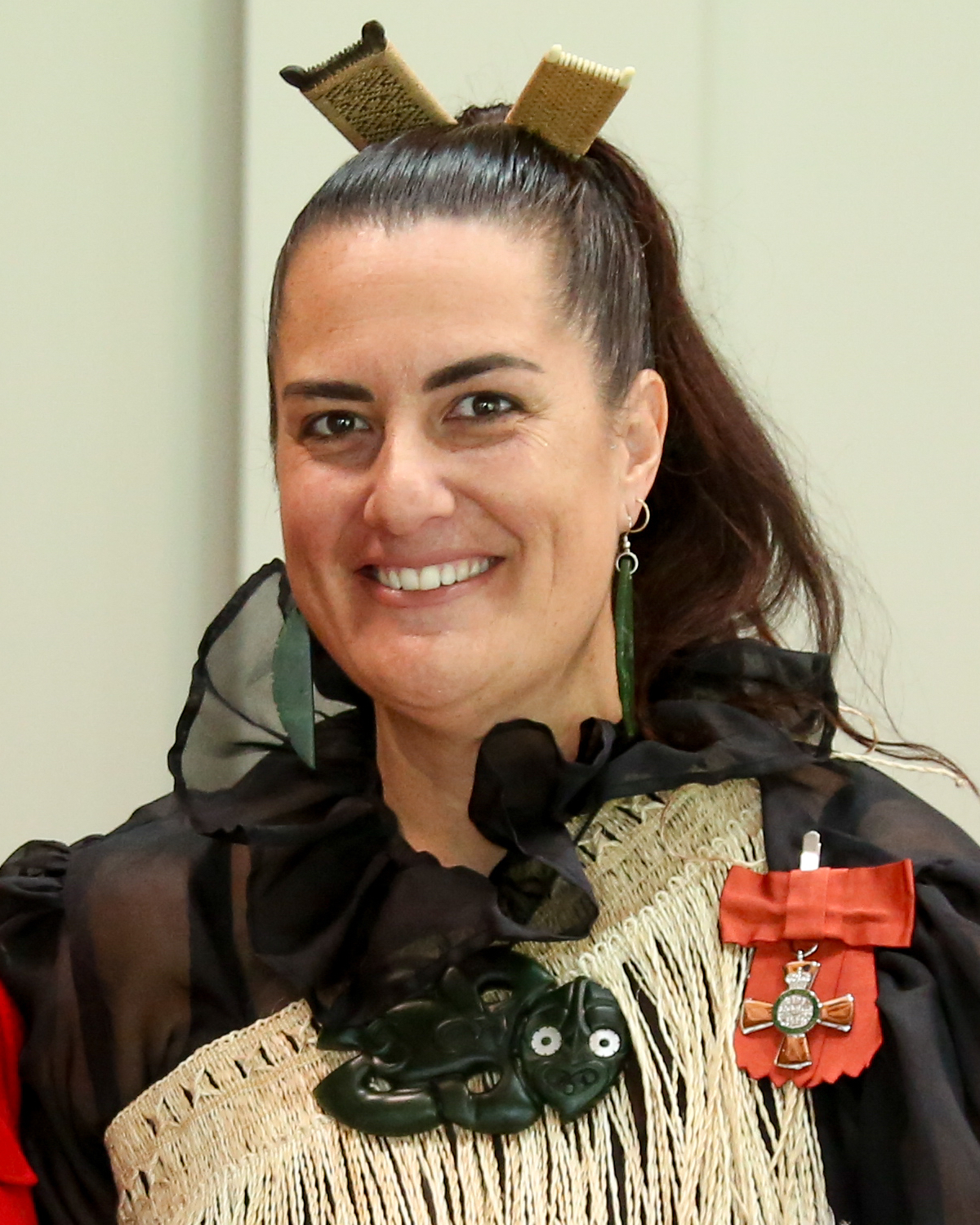
- Matata-Sipu in 2023
- Born: 1985 or 1986 (age 40–41); Māngere, Auckland, New Zealand
- Occupations: Artist; journalist; photographer; social activist
- Spouse: Willie Sipu
- Website: www.qiane.co.nz

Qiane May Matata-Sipu MNZM (born 1985 or 1986) is a New Zealand community worker, public speaker, writer, and photographer.

== Early life and family ==
Matata-Sipu was born in 1985 or 1985, and grew up in Māngere and Ihumātao in Auckland. She affiliates to the Māori nations of Te Wai o Hua ki Te Ahiwaru me Te Ākitai, Waikato, Ngāpuhi and Ngāti Pikiao. Her heritage is also from Mangaia and from Arorangi on Rarotonga, both in the Cook Islands. Her surname combines the surnames of her grandfather, Jones Matata, and her husband, Willie Sipu. Her grandparents raised her and she spent a lot of time at her marae with them as a child. Her grandmother Dawn Matata was a weaver, and her artwork is in the wharenui (meeting house) at the marae. Her grandfather Jones Matata, was one of the people who carved the wharenui.

== Education and career ==
Matata-Sipu has a university degree majoring in journalism from Auckland University of Technology (AUT). She studied rumaki reo (total immersion Māori language) at Te Wānanga Takiura.

As a journalist Matata-Sipu worked for Mana, a New Zealand magazine, and was deputy editor of Spasifik, a Māori and Pasifika magazine. As a freelance journalist Matata-Sipu has written for New Zealand media Newsroom, The Spinoff and New Zealand Geographic. She founded a company called QIANE+co in 2017.

Matata-Sipu is the founder and creator of NUKU, a multimedia series, in 2018. NUKU 'invites wāhine to look at the world through a different cultural lens: one made by and for Indigenous women, mā hine mō hine kia hine'. As well as including photography, audio podcast, video, and live events, NUKU has also published a book in 2022 entitled NUKU: Stories of 100 Indigenous Women.

In 2022 Matata-Sipu was a presenter at M9, an event with Māori speakers, which is described as part 'TED talk' and part conference. In 2022, Matata-Sipu also appeared at the Verb Wellington literary festival.

Matata-Sipu is a co-founder and leader of the SOUL Protect Ihumātao campaign, and is a trustee of Makaurau Marae.

== Honours and awards ==
At the 2021 New Zealand Women of Influence Awards, Matata-Sipu was the winner of the arts and culture category. The following year, her first book, NUKU: Stories of 100 Indigenous Women, was shortlisted in the illustrated non-fiction category of the Ockham New Zealand Book Awards.

In the 2023 King's Birthday and Coronation Honours, Matata-Sipu was appointed a Member of the New Zealand Order of Merit, for services to the arts. The citation for the honour recorded that she had "contributed significantly to Māori and Pasifika self-determination for 20 years", and that through NUKU, established by her in 2018, she had worked "to celebrate the sovereignty of Indigenous women and reduce impacts of racial discrimination and social exclusion".

Matata-Sipu's 2025 book Taku Ikura Tuatahi was nominated for the Wright Family Foundation Te Kura Pounamu Award in the 2026 New Zealand Book Awards for Children and Young Adults.
