= Brianne West =

New Zealand entrepreneur (born 1987/88)

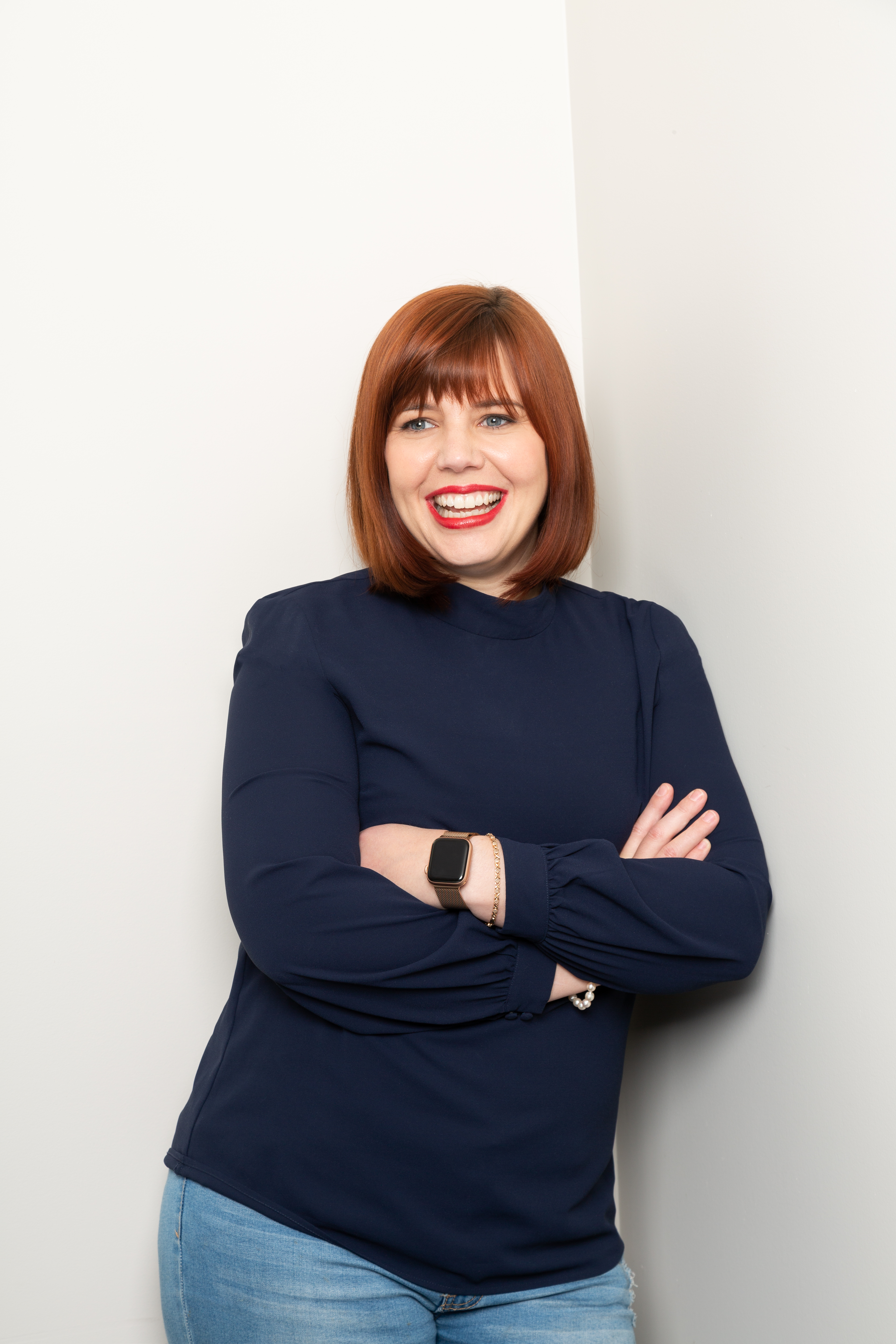
- West in 2019
- Born: 1987 or 1988 (age 38–39); Port Erin, Isle of Man
- Occupation: Entrepreneur
- Known for: Environmentalist

Brianne West (born 1987 or 1988) is a New Zealand environmentalist, entrepreneur and the founder of plastic-free drinks brand Incrediballs and Ethique, the world's first zero-waste beauty brand. In 2016 she was named a "Global Thinker" by Foreign Policy magazine and in 2019 the EY Young Entrepreneur of the Year.

In 2022 Mattel named West their Barbie Role Model for New Zealand and created a custom Barbie in her likeness.

== Early life ==
West was born in 1987 or 1988 in Port Erin on the Isle of Man. At age 7, she moved to New Zealand, settling in Queenstown. West attended Wakatipu High School.

West founded her first company, a pet detective agency, at age eight. She started her first natural cosmetics business as a high-school leaver at the age of 19, and ran it for two years before starting a confectionery company.

== Ethique ==
West began creating solid-bar shampoo and conditioner in her kitchen as a hobby in 2012, while in the second year of her Bachelor of Science degree at the University of Canterbury, in Christchurch, New Zealand. West used the knowledge from her studies to formulate products with natural ingredients from ethical and sustainable sources. By removing water from the products, West created a range of completely plastic-free products which were also not tested on animals, and were sold in biodegradable and compostable packaging. Later the same year she started marketing the bars under the company name of Sorbet Cosmetics.

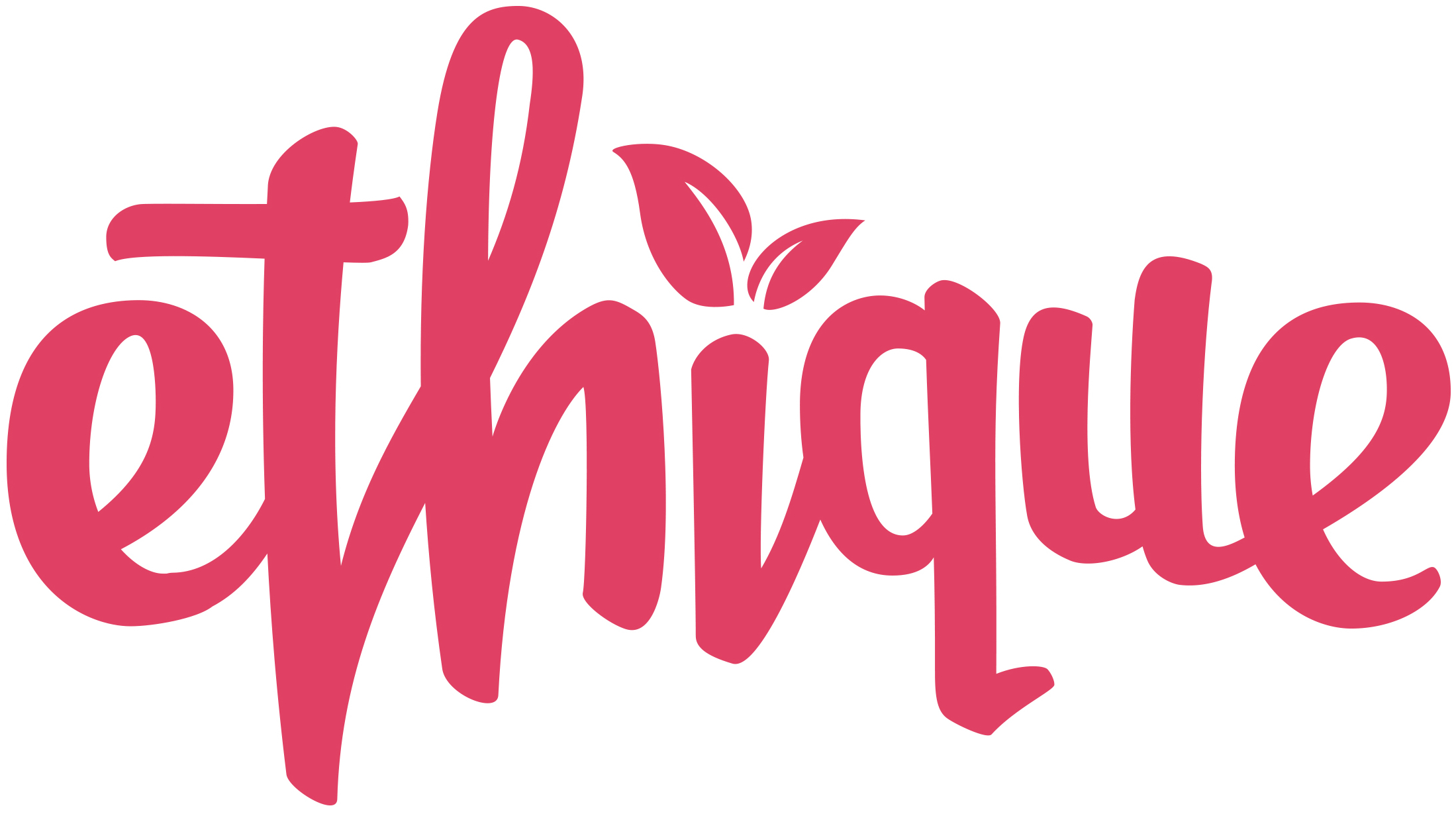

In 2013, she entered a business entrepreneurship competition at her university called "entré". As a result of becoming a finalist she secured a business mentor.

By 2015, her company had prevented 60,000 bottles from needing to be recycled and West re-branded the company as Ethique.

In 2015, West launched an online crowdfunding campaign through PledgeMe, which raised NZ$200,000, and attracted the largest number of female investors in the site's history. The funds were used to build a customised laboratory for developing and manufacturing products, and to expand the company to global markets. She expanded the range of products to include solid body wash, face creams and moisturisers, deodorants, self-tanning bars, household cleaning products and pet wash. In 2017, West launched a second crowdfunding campaign and reached PledgeMe's daily limit of NZ$500,000 in 90 minutes. In 2019 the company had a turnover of more than $10 million a year.

In 2019, the company expanded operations to stores in the UK.

In 2020, West was named as an Obama Foundation Leader and as One Young World Entrepreneur of the Year. Ethique also officially achieved 10 million bottles saved from use and West announced a new goal of half a billion by 2030. Ethique expanded to more than 20 countries including Australia, United States, Taiwan, and Hong Kong.

West sold 75% of the shares in Ethique to New York-based investment firm Bansk Group in late 2020. In 2023 she resigned as chief executive of the company.

=== Products ===
The company makes a range of solid hair, face and body bars. All products are sold in compostable packaging, meaning zero consumer waste. Ethique only uses biodegradable ingredients and wrappers so its solid bars leave no trace on the planet. Consumers can dispose of the compostable wrapping in their home compost bin. This means there are no bottles, jars, lids or pump dispensers contributing to landfill or oceanic pollution. The company also champions the use of fair trade and sustainable supply chains.

== Later career ==
After selling Ethique, West launched Nous Labs (later changed to Insprie Labs), which provides investment and mentoring for environmentally and socially focused enterprises.

She founded Business, but Better, a free education and mentoring hub, in late 2022 to help other entrepreneurs build successful mission-driven enterprises.

In 2023 West announced her new company Incrediballs, launching in 2025, a plastic-free drinks brand creating 'soda balls' in a bid to tackle the plastic waste in the drinks industry.

== Awards and recognition ==
- 2024: Kiwibank Innovator of the Year, finalist
- 2023: Kea World Class New Zealand Award
- 2023: The New Zealand Hall of Fame for Women Entrepreneurs
- 2022: Blake Leader (Sir Peter Blake Trust)
- 2020: Time magazine 100 Best Inventions of 2020 – Ethique Concentrates
- 2020: One Young World Young Entrepreneur of the Year
- 2020: Obama Leader Asia Pacific
- 2019: NZI Sustainable Business Network Awards, Communication for Change commendation
- 2019: New Zealand Women of Influence Awards, Business Enterprise winner
- 2019: Deloitte Fast 50, ranked fourth fasted growing company in New Zealand
- 2019: Westpac Champion Business Awards, ChristchurchNZ Champion Innovation winner and the Westpac Champion Supreme Awards Small Enterprise winner
- 2019: New Zealand Young Entrepreneur of the Year (Ernst & Young)
- 2019: American Chamber of Commerce (New Zealand) DHL Express – Exporter of the Year to the USA $1 million to $10 million
- 2018: Kiwibank Local Hero Award
- 2018: Kiwibank Innovator of the Year, semi-finalist
- 2016: Top 100 leading "Global Thinkers" in the American Foreign Policy magazine
- 2016: Vital Voices by Bank of America mentee
- 2016: East-West Center's Changing Faces Women's Leadership Seminar, participant
- 2016: EY Entrepreneurial Winning Women, participant
- 2015: Deloitte's "Rising Star – One to Watch"
- 2015: New Zealand Green Apple Awards (for environmental best practice), silver
