= Abbie Reynolds =

New Zealand environmental advocate

Abbie Reynolds is a New Zealand climate change and sustainability advocate.

== Early life and education ==
While at secondary school, Reynolds started a paper recycling scheme when the effects of climate change were not well-known. She has a law degree from the University of Auckland.

== Career ==
Reynolds was previously head of sustainability at Vodafone and headed the Vodafone Foundation. Prior to this she was Head of Corporate Responsibility at Telecom (now Spark).

Reynolds was executive director of the Sustainable Business Council from 2016 to 2019. The membership of the Sustainable Business Council doubled within this time to represent 30% of New Zealand businesses with Business NZ Chief Executive Kirk Hope praising her contribution.

In 2018, she co-founded the New Zealand Leaders' Climate Coalition with Mike Bennetts, chief executive of Z Energy. New Zealand Climate Change Minister James Shaw praised her and Bennetts's work launching the Coalition and reaching a membership of 100 organisations. She attended the World Business Council for Sustainable Development (WBCSD) meeting in Geneva in 2018.

Her other roles have included being part of the New Zealand Government's Electric Vehicle Leadership Group and a member of the Prime Minister’s Chief Science Advisor's Rethinking Plastics Panel. Reynolds has been a board member of VOYCE Whakarongo Mai since January 2017. In a 2017 article in the New Zealand online magazine The Spinoff, Reynolds wrote:

Climate change can be an opportunity for New Zealand. Not only can we do our bit to reduce global emissions, we can be an innovation leader and better everyone’s lives.

Reynolds presented to the United Nations in July 2019 as part of a panel demonstrating New Zealand's progress on the Sustainable Development Goals.

She was interviewed on the Entrepreneurial Women with Purpose podcast in 2020.

Reynolds was appointed as Chief Executive Officer for Predator Free 2050 in September 2020.

=== Recognition ===
Reynolds won the Board and Management Award in the 2019 New Zealand Women of Influence Awards. Her outward focus and willingness to help organisations achieve their sustainability goals won praise from the judges. In 2020, she sat on the judging panel together with Dame Silvia Cartwright, Sir John Kirwan, Vanisa Dhiru, Sinead Boucher and Gina Dellabarca.

== Personal life ==
Reynolds lives in Auckland and is married to Daren Grover, the general manager of Project Jonah. After meeting in the United Kingdom in 2003, she and Grover travelled through 26 countries on their journey to New Zealand and blogged about their travels.
