= Sharesies =

New Zealand investing platform

- Type: Private
- Industry: Stockbroking
- Founded: 2017; 9 years ago
- Founders: Richard Clark; Ben Crotty; Brooke Roberts; Leighton Roberts; Martyn Smith; Sonya Williams
- Headquarters: Wellington, New Zealand
- Area served: New Zealand and Australia
- Products: Stockbroker, micro-investing trading platform, KiwiSaver, savings accounts
- Owners: Trade Me (15.4%); Discount Nominees (9.5%); Brooke Roberts (6.26%); Leighton Roberts (6.26%); Sonya Williams (6.26%); (2020)
- Website: www.sharesies.nz

Sharesies is a New Zealand stockbroker and micro-investing app that allows users to buy and sell fractions of shares on the stock market rather than requiring users to buy or sell entire shares. It was launched in 2017.

As of 2024, it had 700,000 clients in New Zealand and Australia.

== History ==
The company was founded by Richard Clark, Ben Crotty, Brooke Roberts, Leighton Roberts, Martyn Smith and Sonya Williams in 2017. The founders were working corporate jobs as they started the company, and pitched it to a business accelerator programme run by Kiwibank and Creative HQ.

The platform saw a big rise in the number of users during the COVID-19 pandemic starting in 2020. By 2022, Sharesies reached 500,000 users, meaning that about 11 per cent of the country's population used the platform. By late 2024, Sharesies had 700,000 users in New Zealand and Australia and was managing $5 billion invested by its users. During the last quarter of 2024, about $3.1 billion was traded using Sharesies.

In 2021 Sharesies started allowing Australian clients to use the platform, and also allowed users to trade on the Australian Securities Exchange. In 2023 Sharesies launched no-fees savings accounts. In 2024, Sharesies bought the Auckland-based investor management platform start-up Orchestra. That year the company started allowing users to trade shares of the Fonterra co-operative, which can only be traded by dairy farmers. Sharesies has suggested that they may allow trading of shares of other co-operatives on the Unlisted Securities Exchange such as Zespri in the future.

In 2020, Sharesies raised $25 million, including from Trade Me, Icehouse Ventures and Stephen Tindall's company K1W1. In 2020, the largest shareholders were Trade Me (15.4 per cent) and Discount Nominees (9.5 per cent). Co-founders Brooke Roberts, Leighton Roberts and Sonya Williams each owned 6.26 per cent. A funding round in 2021 valued the company at $500 million.

In August 2021, the Financial Markets Authority issued a formal warning to the company for deficiencies in their compliance with the Anti-Money Laundering and Countering Financing of Terrorism Act 2009. Sharesies cooperated with the regulator and began a programme to strengthen its customer-identification and due diligence processes.

Williams has said that her first ever investment was on Sharesies, because she did not have enough capital to use the more traditional means of investing.

In 2023, Sharesies broadened its business beyond share trading, launching a savings product and its own KiwiSaver scheme. By the end of 2024, its KiwiSaver scheme had almost 10,000 members and approximately NZ$300 million in funds under management.

Sharesies made its first acquisition in April 2024, acquiring Auckland-based equity-management platform Orchestra. The acquisition expanded Sharesies' business-to-business services into private company share registries and employee share schemes.

In October 2024, Sharesies expanded its KiwiSaver offering by launching a US500 fund providing exposure to the Vanguard S&P 500 ETF, and allowing members to invest part of their KiwiSaver portfolio directly in selected US-listed companies.

== See also ==
- Day trading
- Discount broker
- List of electronic trading platforms
- Robinhood Markets
