= Katie Milne =

New Zealand dairy farmer and politician

Katie Milne MP
- Milne in 2026

Member of the New Zealand Parliament for West Coast-Tasman
- Incumbent
- Assumed office 7 November 2026
- Preceded by: Maureen Pugh

Personal details
- Born: 1970 (age 55–56) Greymouth, New Zealand
- Party: National

Katrina Sarah Milne is a New Zealand dairy farmer and politician. From 2017 to 2020, she was president of Federated Farmers, the first woman president in the organisation's history.

== Farming career ==
Milne became involved with Federated Farmers in 1991, and served as a board member and provincial president for the West Coast branch. In 2017 she was appointed national president. She has also served on the National Animal Welfare Advisory Committee, chaired the West Coast TB Free Committee and was a member of the Farmer Mental Wellness Strategy Group. Milne is a director of Westland Milk Products, and helped found the Lake Brunner Community Catchment Care Group.

In 2015 Milne was named Fonterra Dairy Woman of the Year and also won the rural category of the New Zealand Women of Influence Awards.

== Political career ==
On 11 April 2026, Milne was announced as the National Party's candidate for West Coast-Tasman in the 2026 election. She was ranked 24th on the National Party list. Of the ten largest increases in electorate candidate majorities, only two went to National, and Milne had the largest increase based on provisional results – more than 5500 votes more than Maureen Pugh.

New Zealand Parliament
Years	Term	Electorate	List	Party
2026–present	55th	West Coast-Tasman	24	National
