= Stacey Shortall =

New Zealander lawyer

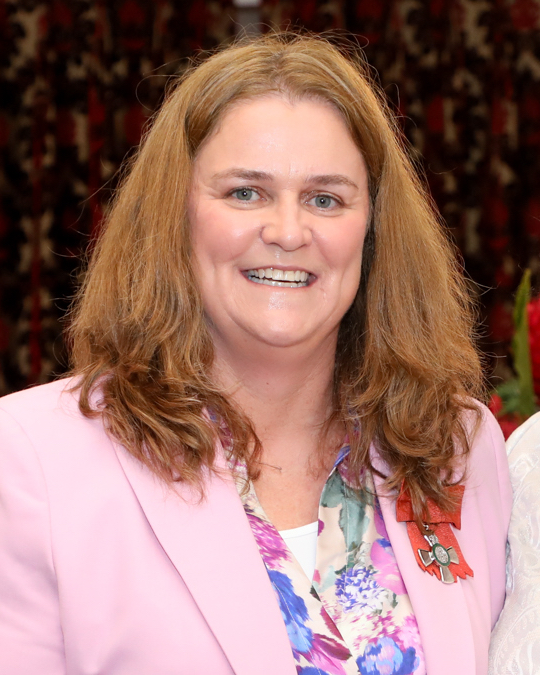
Shortall in 2023

Stacey Anne Shortall MNZM is a New Zealand lawyer, based in Wellington. She has received a number of awards for her legal work and social programmes, which aim to develop children and women to their full potential.

== Early life and education ==
Shortall was born and raised on a farm in Colyton in the Manawatū, in the North Island of New Zealand. She graduated with a BCA (Accounting) degree from Victoria University of Wellington in 1994, followed by a Bachelor of Laws degree in 1995. She completed her Master of Laws degree at the University of Alberta, Canada, in 1992, and obtained a Public International Law Certificate from The Hague Academy of International Law in 2000.

== Career ==
Shortall was admitted to the New Zealand bar in 1996, and began her legal career as a solicitor at MinterEllisonRuddWatts (then known as Rudd Watts & Stone). She then joined Paul, Weiss, Rifkind, Wharton & Garrison, a Wall Street law firm in New York, for 11 years before returning to New Zealand and MinterEllisonRuddWatts in 2010, where she took a position as partner. Shortall has over 20 years' experience in litigation cases and regulatory matters and regularly represents financial institutions, other corporate clients, public sector entities and directors and officers. She specialises in commercial claims, crisis management, insurance, white collar crime, and health and safety matters. Shortall is recognised by international legal directories as a leading New Zealand lawyer.

Shortall co-authored the 2016 Thomson Reuters book Health and Safety at Work in New Zealand: Know the Law, which covers all essential elements of the Health and Safety at Work Act 2015.

In 2011, Shortall represented former Pike River Mine chief executive, Peter Whittall at the Royal Commission held in to the disaster at the underground coal mine in which 29 men died. She said her client had been made the "fall guy" for the disaster.

Shortall is a frequent speaker on issues concerning gender diversity and inclusion in the legal profession. In 2017, she chaired the inaugural Women in Law conference in New Zealand and was a guest speaker at the 2018 conference, where she addressed the topic of harassment and bullying in law firms. Shortall penned Turning the tide to make more women law partners in New Zealand, which was presented at a New Zealand Law Society Conference in 2016. She is also a member of Global Women, a non-profit membership organisation driving diversity in leadership in New Zealand.

Shortall is an advocate for criminal justice reform in New Zealand.

=== Charitable work ===
While working in New York, Shortall volunteered for Volunteers of Legal Service on the Incarcerated Mothers Law Project at Bayview Correctional Facility in Manhattan. She represented incarcerated mothers facing termination of their parental rights, a mother sentenced to 20 years to life in prison for the murder of her abusive boyfriend and for a refugee mother who had been raped and tortured. She also worked as part of a team undertaking research for the International Criminal Tribunal for Rwanda on genocide and rape as war crimes. Shortall volunteered for the Neighborhood Defender Service of Harlem to advocate for mothers seeking to have their children returned from foster care.

In 2004, Shortall spent a month-long sabbatical working in Ghana for NGO Women For Progress which focussed on violence against women and children including through village outreach programmes. Shortall also volunteered for the Ghanaian Police Force to assist with investigations and prosecutions of rapists.

Shortall is the founding trustee of the Who Did You Help Today charitable trust in New Zealand, which connects skilled people with not-for-profit community projects. In 2014, the trust initiated a homework club at a primary school in a low socio-economic area of Porirua where volunteers visit the school and help children with their homework for one hour a week. Staff from MinterEllisonRuddWatts continue to visit the school today. Through the charitable trust, Shortall also assists other low-decile schools and organisations around New Zealand to connect with each other to form similar clubs.

Shortall organises group of volunteer lawyers across New Zealand as part of the Mothers Project, which assists mothers in prison and encourages them to maintain a relationship with their children. The programme was developed in consultation with the Department of Corrections and the trust trains all volunteers involved. The Who Did You Help Today trust also runs HelpTank, which is New Zealand’s first home-grown digital platform that matches not-for-profits with skilled professionals to enhance collective capability to achieve social change.

== Honours and awards ==
In 2015, Shortall won the community and not-for-profit category award in the New Zealand Women of Influence Awards. The same year, she won LawFuel's Lawyer of the Year award. In 2016, she received a Blake Leader Award from the Sir Peter Blake Trust. Also in 2016, she was recognised with a Kiwibank Local Hero Award. Shortall was a finalist in the community category of the Next Woman of the Year Awards 2017. In 2018, she was named as New Zealand’s Disputes Star of the Year at the annual Asia Law Asia-Pacific Dispute Resolution Awards.

In the 2022 Queen's Birthday and Platinum Jubilee Honours, Shortall was appointed a Member of the New Zealand Order of Merit, for services to the law and the community.
