= Emeline Afeaki-Mafile'o =

New Zealand activist (born c. 1976)

- Born: c. 1976; Tonga
- Education: Massey University

Emeline Afeaki-Mafile'o (c. 1976 - ) OM is a New Zealand activist for Pasifika people in Auckland.

== Early life and work ==
Afeaki-Mafile'o was born in Tonga to Pat and Edith Afeaki. She said that she never read a book until she was nineteen however she later attended Massey University where she graduated and then took a master's degree in philosophy.

In 2001 at the age of 25 she was running her own mentoring service. The service went on to employ 100 people to deliver support to 5,000 Pasifika young people in Auckland.

She runs a community café in the Auckland suburb of Ōtāhuhu. She and her family own a coffee factory in Tonga and the coffee is sent to New Zealand to support her work.

== Awards ==
In 2006 she was given a Sir Peter Blake Emerging Leader Award.

In 2013 she won the Community Service and Social Enterprise category of the New Zealand Women of Influence Awards.

In 2016 she was awarded an Order of Merit for her work with the Pacific communities as part of the New Year Honours.
