= Bernadette Pinnell =

New Zealand founder of social housing enterprise

Bernadette Pinnell is a business leader specialising in social housing enterprises. In 2022, she was awarded the Community Hero Award at the New Zealand Women of Influence Awards.

== Biography ==
Pinnell was raised in Northern Ireland. She completed a master’s degree in urban planning at the University of Sydney, and a doctorate focused on urban renewal projects at the University of New South Wales. Pinnell moved to New Zealand to join the Canterbury Earthquake Recovery Authority following the 2011 Christchurch earthquake.

Pinnell established an affordable housing organisation, Compass Housing New Zealand. In 2015, she joined Home in Place, an Australian non-profit organisation also focused on affordable housing, and established a New Zealand branch of the organisation.

Pinnell was chair of the Urban Development Institute of New Zealand from 2023 to 2024.
