= GoHenry =

Financial technology company

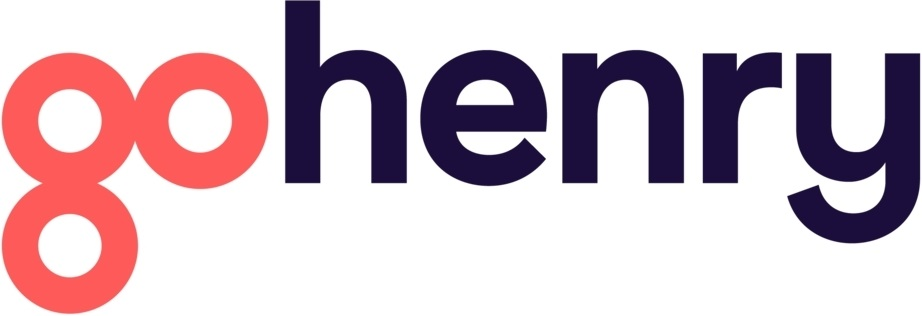
- Industry: Financial technology
- Founded: 2012; 14 years ago
- Founder: Louise Hill and Dean Brauer
- Headquarters: United Kingdom
- Key people: Alex Zivoder (CEO)
- Revenue: 36,395,050 (2021)
- Number of employees: 264 (2021)
- Website: gohenry.com

GoHenry is a UK-based financial technology company that provides a Visa debit card and financial education app for children aged 6 to 18.

== History ==
GoHenry was co-founded by Louise Hill and Dean Brauer, in 2012 in London, UK.

The company is named after GoHenry's first customer, an 11-year-old boy named Henry.

As of 2014, the monthly subscription cost £1.97 per child with no charge for closing an account. As of 9 July 2022, the monthly fee was £2.99 per child. Go Henry Pricing Online

In 2016, the company broke an equity crowdfunding world record, by raising $5.6 million on Crowdcube.

In 2020, the company raised $40 million in funding led by Edison Partners and with the participation of Revai (formerly Gaia Capital Partners), Citi Ventures, and Muse Capital.

As of November 2021, the company reports 2 million members (parents and children), up 500K users from December 2020.

In 2021, it got Best Children's Financial Provider from the British Bank Awards. In June of 2022, GoHenry acquired PixPay, a French startup, for an undisclosed sum.

In 2023 they were acquired by Acorns, a U.S.-based savings and investing startup. In June 2026, Barclays agreed to acquire GoHenry's UK business from Acorns for an undisclosed amount; Barclays stated that they intend to keep the GoHenry brand and standalone app.

== Reception ==
In late 2021, Gohenry launched Money Missions, gamified financial lesson about money savings. According to New York Times review, Gohenry is best for parents who want to track money spent by their children. In another story, The New York Times highlighted that GoHenry is useful for parents who are "tired of having a drawer full of dollars" to give to children. Cards International magazine made a review about Gohenry in 2018 stated that "getting children into good financial habits for the current banking landscape will make a huge difference to them in later life".

Mashable and Newsweek included Gohenry into its list of top family apps to manage pocket money and chores.

According to Computer Weekly, GoHenry migrated to Google Cloud Platform in 2017.
