= Sheldon Pinnell =

American dermatologist

Sheldon R. Pinnell (c. 1937 - 4 July 2013) was an American dermatologist and physician-scientist who served as the J. Lamar Callaway Professor of Dermatology at Duke University. His research involves sun protection, photoaging, collagen chemistry, and topical percutaneous absorption of antioxidants. In 2013, he was made an honorary member of the Society of Investigative Dermatology.

He was the founder of SkinCeuticals, whose first cosmetic products were based on Pinnell's research.

== Education ==
Pinnell earned his BA degree in chemistry from Duke University and his MD degree from Yale University. He conducted a residency at the University of Minnesota Medical School and dermatology residencies at Harvard University and Massachusetts General Hospital.
