= Stash (company) =

Fintech company specialising in online equity accounts

Stash Financial, Inc.
- Type: Private
- Industry: Financial technology
- Founded: February 2015; 11 years ago
- Founder: Brandon Krieg; Ed Robinson; David Ronick
- Headquarters: New York City, New York, United States
- Products: Investment management, investment portfolios, stock portfolios, stock trading
- AUM: ▲$4.3 billion (2025)
- Website: www.stash.com

Stash Financial, Inc., or Stash, is an American financial technology and financial services company based in New York, NY. The company operates both a web platform and mobile apps, allowing users to incrementally invest small amounts, commonly known as micro-investing. It also provides robo advice.

== History ==
Stash was founded in February 2015 by Brandon Krieg, David Ronick, and Ed Robinson.

It was launched on the iOS App Store in October 2015 and made available on Android in March 2016.

By summer 2017, Stash had approximately one million users.

In February 2018, the firm raised $37.5 million in a Series D funding in a round led by Union Square Ventures. In April 2020, it raised another $112 million in Series F funding in a round led by LendingTree.

As of July 2020, Stash's user base had grown to over five million customers.

In October 2024, Stash laid off 40% of its employees.

In May 2025, the firm secured $146 million in a series H funding round to deepen its investment into Artificial intelligence. "For a decade, Stash has helped millions take control of their financial futures,” Stash Co-Founder and Co-CEO Ed Robinson said in a Monday (May 12) press release. “Now, we’re doubling down — transforming how people save, invest and build long-term wealth with AI-powered intelligence at the core.

In February of 2026, Grab Holdings announced they were acquiring Stash for a $425 million valuation.

== Reception ==
In February 2018, CNBC praised the app's automation and ease of use.

== Services ==
Stash offers retirement, banking, individual investment, and custodial accounts through a subscription model.

Through the web platform and mobile apps, users can invest as little as $0.01 in fractional shares of thousands of stocks and more than 80 exchange-traded funds. Users can invest in personal brokerage accounts, retirement accounts, Roth IRAs, traditional IRAs, or custodial accounts.

== See also ==
- Acorns
