= Micro-investing =

Type of investment strategy

Micro-investing is a type of investment strategy that allows individuals to invest small amounts of money regularly over time.

== Background ==
Micro-investing is designed to make investing more accessible and affordable, especially for those who may not have a lot of money to invest or who are new to investing.

The idea of micro-investing has been popularized and made more accessible through the rise of financial technology (fintech) companies such as Stash, Robinhood and Acorns. These companies have made it possible for individuals to invest even small amounts of money regularly.

The goal of the technology is to help people invest small amounts of money easily, regularly, and affordably with the intent of democratizing access to financial services & products that have historically only been available to the wealthy. This Fintech innovation allows many micro-investing platform users to invest very small amounts of money, such as a few cents or dollars, in a portfolio and these small investments can accumulate over time to build up a larger portfolio. These micro-investing platforms are self-directed investing platforms.
