= Hellaby (surname) =

Hellaby is a surname. Notable people with this surname include:

- Richard Hellaby (1849–1902), New Zealand businessman
- Amy Maria Hellaby (1864–1955), New Zealand businesswoman, wife of Richard Hellaby
- Hilda Hellaby (1898–1983), Canadian deaconess
- Alan Hellaby (1926–2001), New Zealand businessman
- Tom Hellaby (1958–2009), New Zealand cricketer
- Charles Hellaby, South African mathematician
