= Harcourt Caughey =

New Zealand rugby union player

Sir Harcourt Caughey KBE CStJ JP
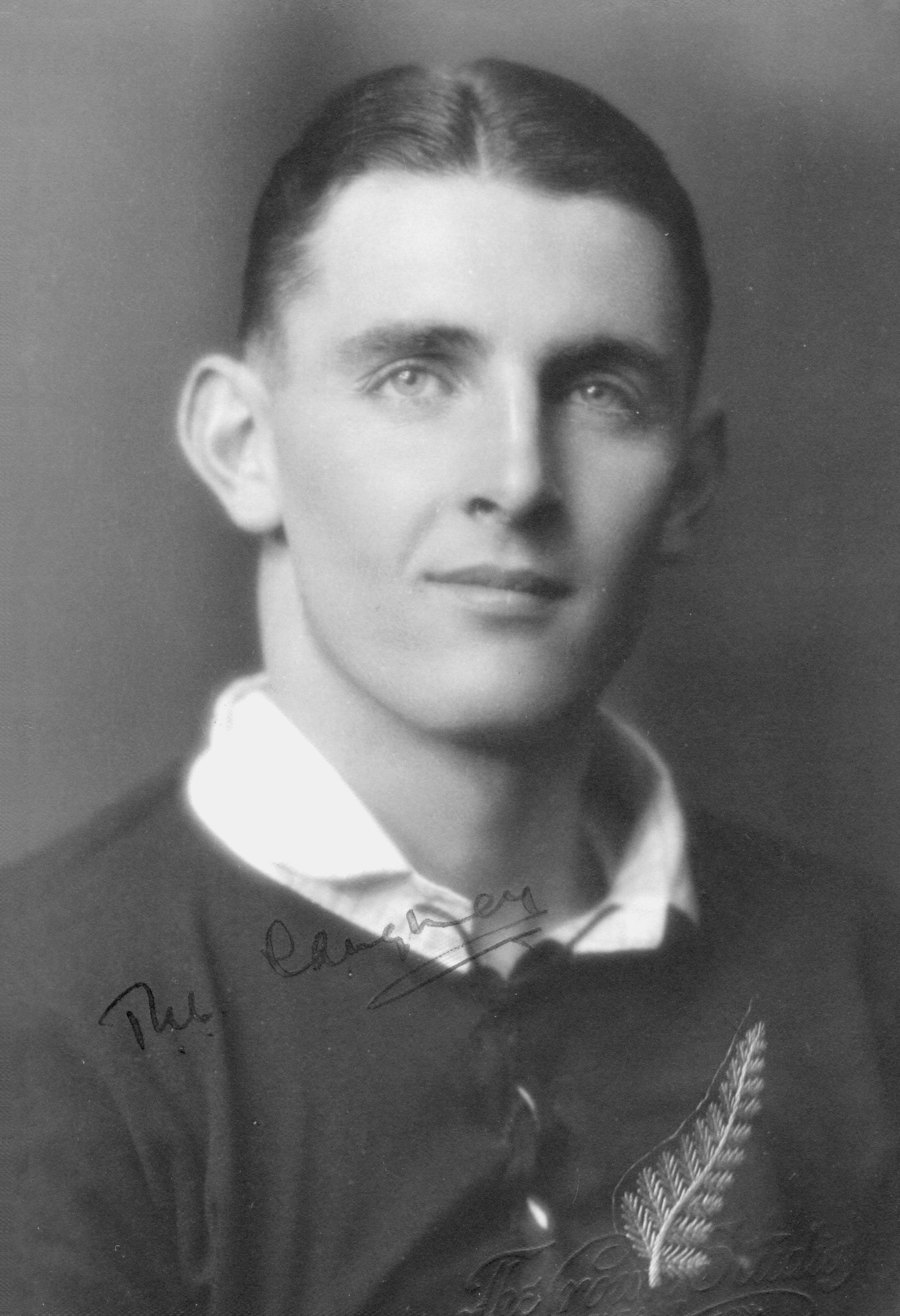
- Born: Thomas Harcourt Clarke Caughey; 4 July 1911 Auckland, New Zealand
- Died: 4 August 1993 (aged 82) Auckland, New Zealand
- Height: 1.83 m (6 ft 0 in)
- Weight: 79 kg (174 lb)
- School: King's College
- Notable relative: Marianne Smith (great aunt)
- Occupation: Department store managing director

Rugby union career
- Position: Centre three-quarter
Provincial / State sides
Years	Team	Apps	(Points)
1931–37	Auckland		
International career
Years	Team	Apps	(Points)
1932–37	New Zealand	9	(9)

Sir Thomas Harcourt Clarke "Pat" Caughey KBE CStJ JP (4 July 1911 – 4 August 1993) was a New Zealand rugby union player.

== Early life and family ==
Born in Auckland in 1911, Caughey was the son of James Marsden Caughey, whose aunt, Marianne Smith (née Caughey), founded in 1880 what became Smith & Caughey's department store. Educated at King's College, he excelled at sports, playing in the 1st XV rugby and 1st XI cricket teams, and winning the school athletics, swimming and boxing championships.

On 4 July 1939, Caughey married Patricia Mary Finlay, the daughter of George Panton Finlay, at King's College Chapel, Auckland, and the couple went on to have three children.

== Rugby union ==
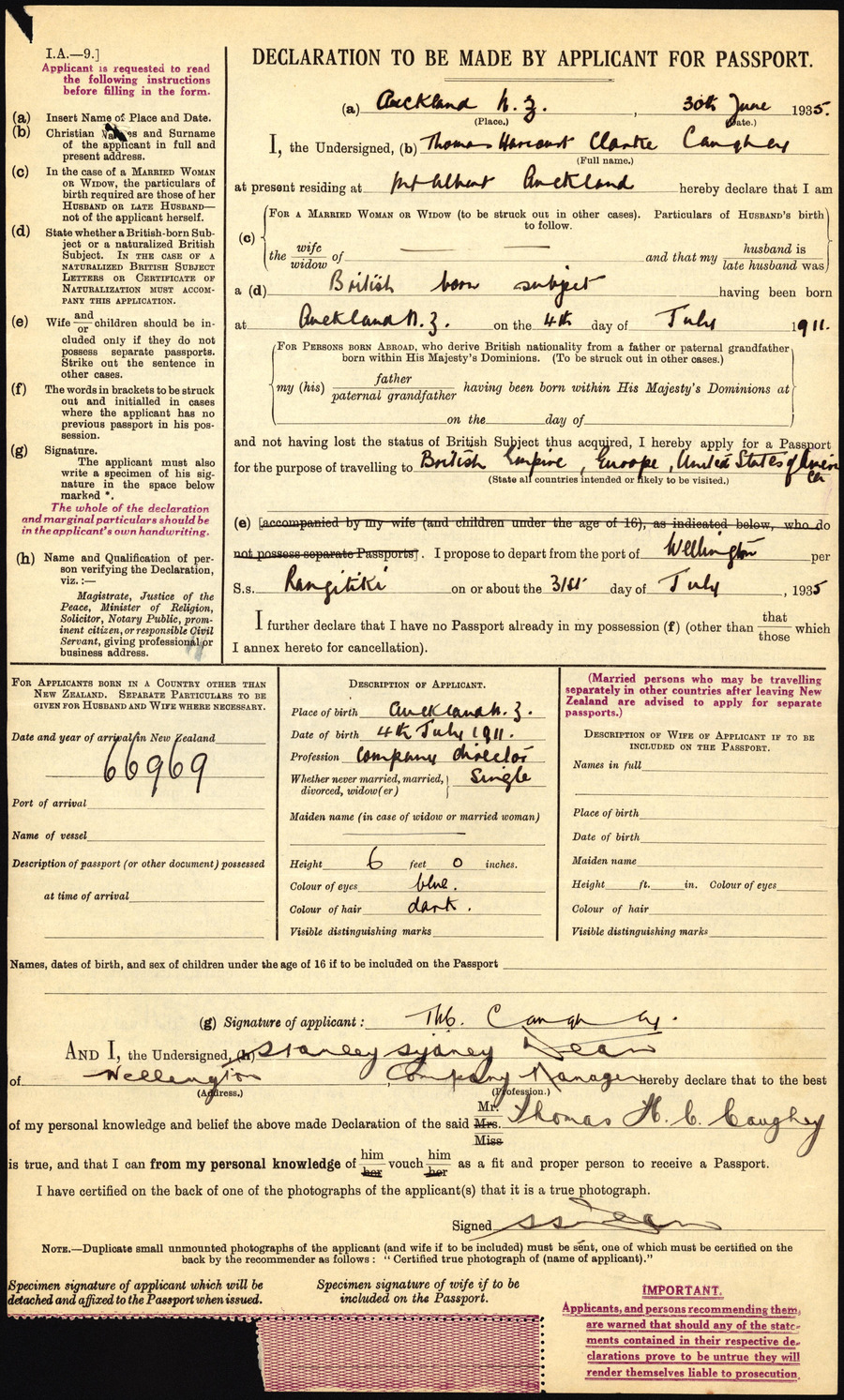
Thomas Harcourt Clarke Caughey passport application (1935)

A centre three-quarter, Caughey represented Auckland at a provincial level, and was a member of the New Zealand national side, the All Blacks, from 1932 to 1937. He played 39 matches for the All Blacks including nine internationals.

Caughey played for Auckland University RFC and represented the Auckland provincial team and the national team before his 21st birthday. He toured Australia with the All Blacks in both 1932 and 1934, playing as a centre. He was one of 188 players who took part in the All Blacks trials for the 1935–36 New Zealand rugby union tour of Britain, Ireland and Canada, and was selected for the final touring party. During the journey to Europe the tour management decided to play Caughey at second five-eighth, in which position he played 20 tour matches including three of the four tests. Caughey scored 14 tries on tour including a hat-trick against Scotland, which were the only tries of his international career.

Caughey played two more tests for New Zealand, in 1936 and 1937, before business commitments ended his high-level rugby career. In addition to his nine full internationals he played 30 non-test games for the All Blacks, scoring 31 tries. Rugby journalist Terry McLean, whose brother Hugh was a teammate of Caughey on the 1935–36 tour, described Caughey as 'an elegant and stylish back of English style' and Charlie Oliver, vice-captain of the 1935–36 tour, assessed him as 'a temperamental player. He was a world beater on his day and was in the match-winner class, but he was liable to be inconsistent. His dashing attacks, and wonderful sense of anticipation, were features of the team's play. His defence, however, was not up to the same standard'.

== Business and public life ==
Caughey worked at the family department store, Smith & Caughey, for 63 years beginning in 1930, and was managing director and chairman of the company for 30 years. He served on the Auckland Hospital Board for 25 years, including 15 years as chair.

In the 1967 New Year Honours, Caughey was appointed an Officer of the Order of the British Empire for community services, especially as chair of the Auckland Hospital Board. Five years later, in the 1972 New Year Honours, he was made a Knight Commander of the Order of the British Empire, for services to health administration.

He was appointed an Officer of the Order of St John in 1965, and promoted to Commander of the same order in 1968. In 1986, Caughey was awarded an honorary LLD by the University of Auckland. He died in Auckland in 1993 and his ashes were buried in Purewa Cemetery. He was posthumously inducted into the New Zealand Business Hall of Fame in 1998.

Mary, Lady Caughey, died in Auckland on 19 December 2011. She was one of the co-founders of the Laura Fergusson Trust, which assisted disabled New Zealanders, and was awarded the Queen's Service Medal for community service in the 1993 Queen's Birthday Honours.
