= Robertson Stewart =

New Zealand industrialist and exporter (1913–2007)

Sir Robertson Stewart CBE
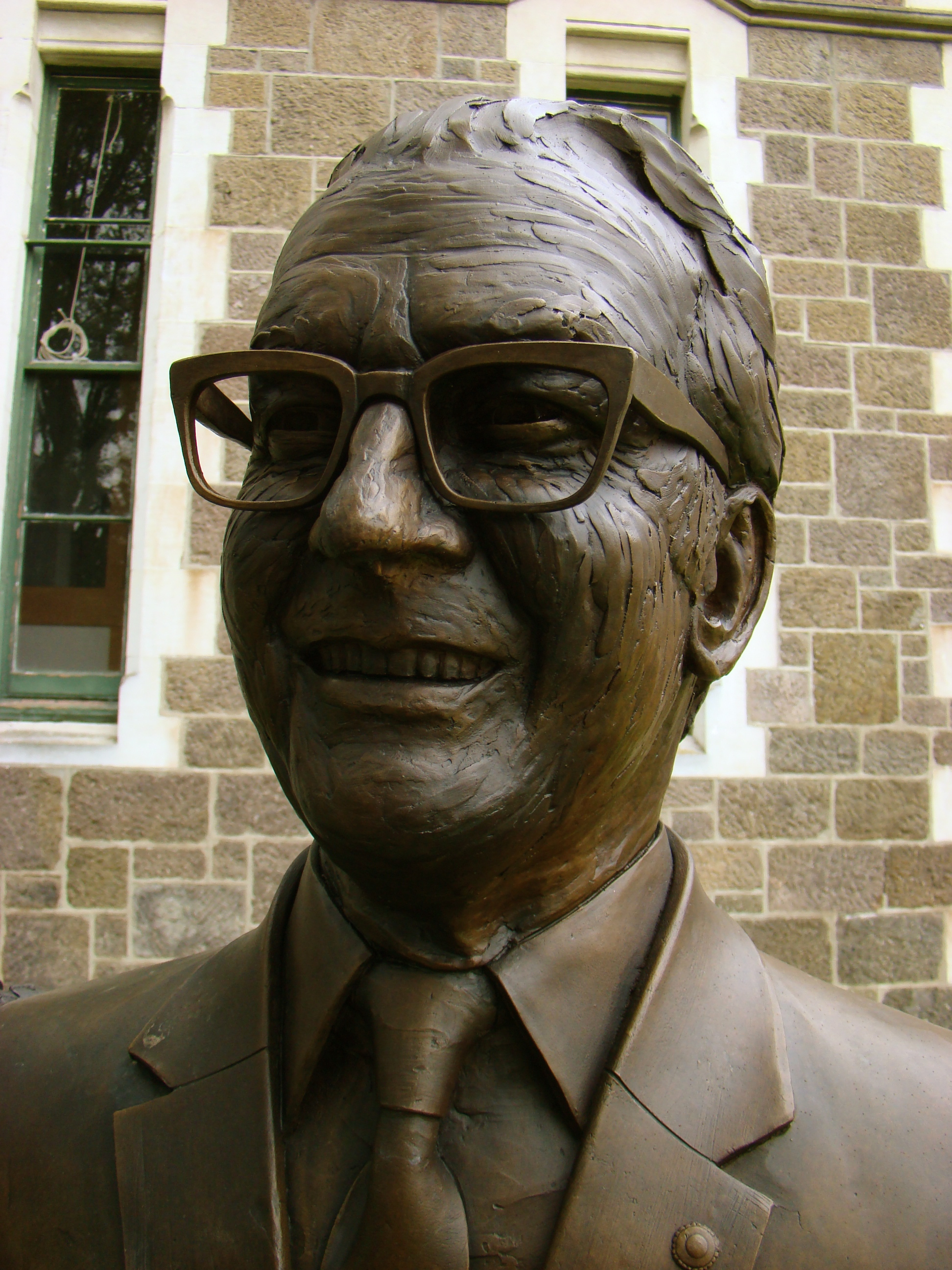
- Bronze bust of Sir Robertson Stewart, one of the Twelve Local Heroes sculpture series
- Born: 21 September 1913; Christchurch, New Zealand
- Died: 13 August 2007 (aged 93); Christchurch, New Zealand
- Occupations: Industrialist and exporter
- Years active: 1929 – mid-1990s
- Spouses: 1. Gladys Gunter (divorced); 2. Ellen Adrienne Peake
- Relatives: Pieter Stewart (daughter-in-law)

Sir Robertson Huntly Stewart CBE (21 September 1913 – 13 August 2007) was a New Zealand industrialist and exporter. He is credited with starting to manufacture plastic goods in the country.

== Early life ==
Stewart was born in Christchurch in 1913. His father, Robertson McGregor Stewart, was an accountant. His mother was Ivy Emily Stewart (née Wooles). His parents separated when he was six, and Stewart and his younger brother Max remained with their mother. They lived in Sydenham and then Linwood. He attended Linwood North Primary School, Christchurch West High School, and one term at Christchurch Boys' High School until age 13, when scarlet fever caused him to leave school. He went to Bottle Lake Hospital in Burwood for treatment and recovered, but did not go back to school.

== Professional career ==
He trained to become an electrical engineer through attending night school for five years. His first employer in 1929 was Harry Urlwin, who instilled in him the sense of never to be frightened of anything or anyone. In 1935, Urlwin sent him to England to learn about plastics. He imported a moulding machine to New Zealand and was the first to manufacture the material in the country.

He started to work for Plastic & Die Casting Ltd in 1947, a company founded ten years earlier. By 1957, he had raised enough money to buy the company, which he renamed PDL. The company was listed on the New Zealand Stock Exchange in 1971 and at its height, employed 2,200 staff with an annual turnover of NZ$350 million. It exported to 50 countries across three continents. He established factories in many countries, including one in Malaysia in 1974. His favourite saying was:

My job is to make ordinary people do extraordinary things.

Stewart retired in the mid-1990s, handing over PDL to his son, Mark Robertson. The 60% family shareholding in PDL was sold in 2001 to the French company Schneider Electric for NZ$97 million.

Stewart was appointed a Commander of the Order of the British Empire in the 1970 New Year Honours and a Knight Bachelor in the 1979 New Year Honours, for services to manufacturing and the community. He was a Christchurch City Councillor from 1969 to 1972. In 1995, he was inducted into the New Zealand Business Hall of Fame. Due to his lack of formal education, the recognition that he was most proud of was his honorary doctorate of engineering from the University of Canterbury.

His business relationship with Malaysia saw him become an Honorary Malaysian Consul, a role that he filled for 28 years. The King of Malaysia appointed him a Companion of the Order of Loyalty to the Crown of Malaysia (JSM) for his business and cultural links.

== Stewart Fountain ==
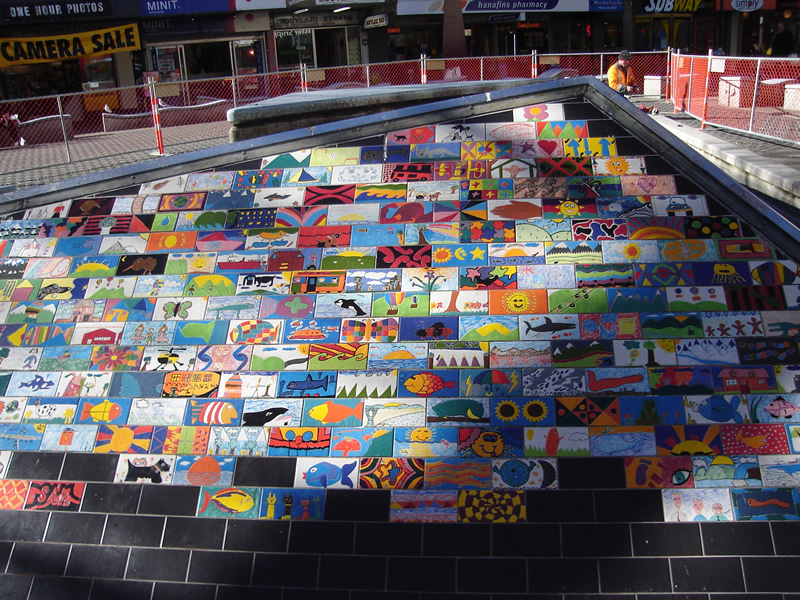
The second Stewart Fountain just before its demolition

In the 1960s, Stewart offered to fund the erection of a fountain on a small public reserve on the corner of Colombo, High, and Hereford Streets. This was built in the early 1970s, Stewart finally putting up NZ$14,000, his first philanthropic contribution to Christchurch.

In 1993 it was decided that the fountain needed to be replaced. By then, its location had become part of the City Mall. The replacement, known as the Stewart Fountain, was built in 1998 at a cost of NZ$700,000, with a NZ$200,000 contribution by Stewart and decorated with hundreds of tiles painted by Christchurch schoolchildren. The fountain developed into a favourite place for young people. Demolition of the fountain began on 13 August 2007 and 13 young people were arrested in a protest over the demolition; Sir Robertson Stewart had died that morning. The removal of the fountain was supported by local business owners, who had long complained about the young people being bad for their businesses.

Christchurch City Council formally named the reserve Stewart Plaza in 2008. Stewart's bequest part-funded the replacement sculpture, "Flour Power", on the condition that the installation be permanent, and that the land be known as Stewart Plaza.

== Family and death ==
In 1937, Stewart married and later divorced Gladys Gunter. They had three children:

- Sir Robert John Stewart (born 1940), knighted in the 2014 Queen's Birthday Honours.
- Elizabeth "Lee" Stewart (born 1943)
- Peter Maxwell Stewart (born 1945) married since 1968 to New Zealand Fashion Week founder Dame Pieter Stewart (who was made a Dame Companion of the New Zealand Order of Merit in the 2012 Birthday Honours).

Peter was jailed in 2008 for three and a half years on historic child sex charges, but had one rape charge against him dismissed in the High Court at Christchurch after serving jail time for his other offences. He was paroled after 14 months.

In 1970, he married his secretary, Melbourne-born Ellen Adrienne Cansdale (who was made a Dame Companion of the New Zealand Order of Merit in the 2015 New Year Honours). There are two children from this second marriage:

- Mark James Stewart
- Todd Huntly Stewart

Stewart died in Christchurch on 13 August 2007. He was survived by his second wife, Adrienne, and five children.
