= Ralph Norris =

Australasian business executive

Sir Ralph Norris KNZM (born 1949) is an Australasian business leader, knighted for services to New Zealand business in 2009. He transitioned from CIO to CEO, leading business and culture transformations across different industries. The chairman of Craigs Investment Partners since 2021, Norris has held several chair and board roles and was previously CEO of ASB Bank (1991–2001), Air New Zealand (2002–2005) and the Commonwealth Bank Group (2005–2011). While at ASB, Norris was instrumental in the launch of New Zealand's first automatic teller machines and Eftpos technology. He is known for his business turnaround acumen and 'no surprises' approach, demonstrating a practical and down-to-earth style. He led the banking industry globally in moving executive long-term incentives (LTIs) away from purely financial performance, linking them for the first time to customer satisfaction. Norris is an honorary Fellow of the Institute of IT Professionals, an ambassador of the Australian Indigenous Education Foundation, was awarded an Honorary Doctorate of Business by the University of New South Wales in 2012, and was inducted into the New Zealand Business Hall of Fame in 2014. He is a strong advocate of tertiary education.

Norris was appointed Distinguished Companion of the NZ Order of Merit in the 2006 New Year Honours List. This was later redesignated as Knight Companion in August 2009 as a result of the reinstatement of the appellations of "Sir" and "Dame" to the New Zealand Royal Honours System.

== Early career ==
Starting as a cadet at the Mobil Oil Company, Sir Ralph soon joined the Auckland Savings Bank (now ASB Bank) in 1969. He was employed in the technology department, promoted to Chief Information Officer (CIO) and then became ASB's CEO in 1991, at the age of 41.

== ASB Bank (CEO 1991–2001) ==
When Sir Ralph became CEO, ASB was a mainly Auckland-based savings bank, ranked seventh in size of New Zealand's banks, with BNZ was six times bigger. The transformation of ASB's culture, technology, customer experience and business performance during Sir Ralph's tenure as CEO was significant and led to Sir Ralph being appointed to lead the Commonwealth Bank Group's international operations. In his decade as CEO, ASB grew into a full-service, national bank and delivered top rankings for customer service each year. The bank also delivered organic market share growth,

== Air New Zealand (CEO 2002–2005) ==
Following September 11 and the collapse of its Australian subsidiary, Ansett Australia, Air New Zealand reported the country's largest ever financial loss. To prevent the national airline's collapse, the New Zealand government was forced to inject over $885 million in capital, taking a majority share in the airline. Sir Ralph, who had been retained on the Air New Zealand Board, was offered the CEO role, taking the reins in early 2002. Under his leadership, the airline became a global success story, establishing itself as Australasia's most profitable airline and launching a number of product innovations and new aircraft types. As CEO, Sir Ralph returned the airline to profitability within 24 months and launched complete overhauls of the domestic and international products. He also introduced the A320, Boeing 777 and Boeing 787 Dreamliner aircraft which continue to be the backbone of the airline's fleet, and he oversaw a ten-fold increase in internet bookings from 4% to 48% of total sales volumes in twelve months. The 'look to book' ratio also rose dramatically, from 25:1 to 8:1.

== Commonwealth Bank Group (CEO 2005–2011) ==
Sir Ralph was approached by the Commonwealth Bank Board to become CEO, taking over from David Murray in mid-2005. Over the next six and a half years, Sir Ralph transformed CBA in terms of culture, shareholder value, market share and technology. He also invested in the redevelopment of the branch network and growth of business banking. Sir Ralph linked executive long-term incentives to customer satisfaction and this move, amongst others, drove an improvement in customer experience levels which saw the bank rise from worst to best of the major Australian banks, across every business area, closing a 23-point gap. In 2010, Sir Ralph was named Customer Service CEO of the Year by the Australian Customer Service Institute, the only bank CEO to ever be awarded this accolade. The same year, he was also named Banker of the Year and Banker of the Decade by Banking & Finance Magazine, along with being named New Zealand CEO of the Decade and Maori Business Leader of the Year in his home country. Over his time as CEO, CBA's share of industry Ombudsman complaints fell dramatically from 30% to 18%, at the same time as the bank's market share grew from 21% to 24%. Sir Ralph oversaw a rise in employee engagement to world's best practice levels and a two third increase in the share price. The rise in shareholder value saw CBA Group move from being the fifth largest company on the Australian Stock Exchange (ASX), to the largest and, in 2009, CBA purchased BankWest from UK-based HBOS Group. Also in 2009, Sir Ralph launched the replacement of the bank's then 40-year-old core banking system – a project that achieved international note for its unique project management approach and successful delivery.

== Private Life ==
Ralph Norris lives in Auckland; he owns homes in Epsom and Waiheke Island.

== Footnotes ==
Business positions
Preceded by Gary Toomey	Chief executive officer of Air New Zealand; 2002–2005	Succeeded by Rob Fyfe
