= Peter Barr =

Peter Barr may refer to:

- Peter Barr (accountant) (1861–1951), New Zealand accountant
- Peter Barr (nurseryman) (1826–1909), Scottish nurseryman and merchant
- Peter Barr (rower) (born 1950), Canadian Olympic rower
