= New Zealand Fashion Week =

New Zealand fashion industry event

New Zealand Fashion Week Kahuria
- Genre: Clothing and fashion exhibitions
- Begins: 17 August 2026
- Ends: 22 August 2026
- Frequency: Annually
- Venue: Shed 10; Christchurch Town Hall
- Locations: Auckland, Christchurch
- Country: New Zealand
- Established: 2001
- Founder: Pieter Stewart
- Organiser: Aligroup Ltd
- People: Feroz Ali (owner), Liam Taylor (Board Director).
- Sponsors: Presenting: Giltrap Group; Ecosystem: Viva Magazine, The Iconic, Hotel Indigio, Westfield Newmarket, Whitecliffe College of Arts and Design, Fernmark, 100% Pure New Zealand, Auckland Council Events, Ngāti Whātua Ōrākei, Fashion & Textiles New Zealand; Experience: Dreame, Ascolour, Scapegrace, Allan Scott Family Winemakers, Budweiser, Tosti 1820 Canelli; Foundation: Eventbrite, Heart of the City Auckland; Friends: Oceania, Showroom 22, Tailored, Daily Catering, Colab; Charity: Breast Cancer Cure
- Website: nzfashionweek.com

New Zealand Fashion Week, also known as NZ Fashion Week or NZFW, is an annual Fashion Week held in New Zealand.

== History ==
New Zealand Fashion Week held its first show on 23 October 2001, opened by the prime minister at the time, Helen Clark. It was held at the Auckland Town Hall and sponsored by L'Oreal (the event was called L'Oreal New Zealand Fashion Week until 2004).

In 2004, Air New Zealand replaced L'Oreal as the naming rights sponsor of the event and the new main venue was moved to the Alinghi and Team New Zealand sheds at the Viaduct Harbour in Auckland.

In 2009, Air New Zealand dropped its naming rights sponsorship for the show.

In 2014, the event moved to the Viaduct Events Centre.

In 2019, NZFW moved back to the original venue at the Auckland Town Hall.

Dame Pieter Stewart, founder of the event, sold it to Faroz Ali in May 2021.

The 2020, 2021 & 2022 fashion weeks were all cancelled. In 2020, the event was cancelled due to the COVID-19 pandemic, and postponed until 2021, which was later cancelled. The 2022 show was also cancelled.

For the return of NZFW in 2023, Kate Sylvester displayed her new collection at the show, and the show will also focus on Māoritanga, sustainably and consumers. The 2024 fashion week was cancelled.

NZFW returned in 2025. In August 2025 it was announced that NZFW would expand to Christchurch, hosting shows from local designers in November alongside the August showings in Auckland.

== See also ==
- iD Dunedin Fashion Week
- List of fashion events
