= Robert Holt (timber merchant) =

New Zealand builder, undertaker, timber merchant, and sawmiller

Robert Holt (c. 1833 – 21 June 1909) was a New Zealand builder, undertaker, timber merchant and sawmiller. He was born in Oldham, Lancashire, England, in about 1833.

In 2000, Holt was posthumously inducted into the New Zealand Business Hall of Fame.
