= Rob Fyfe =

New Zealand businessman

Rob Fyfe CNZM
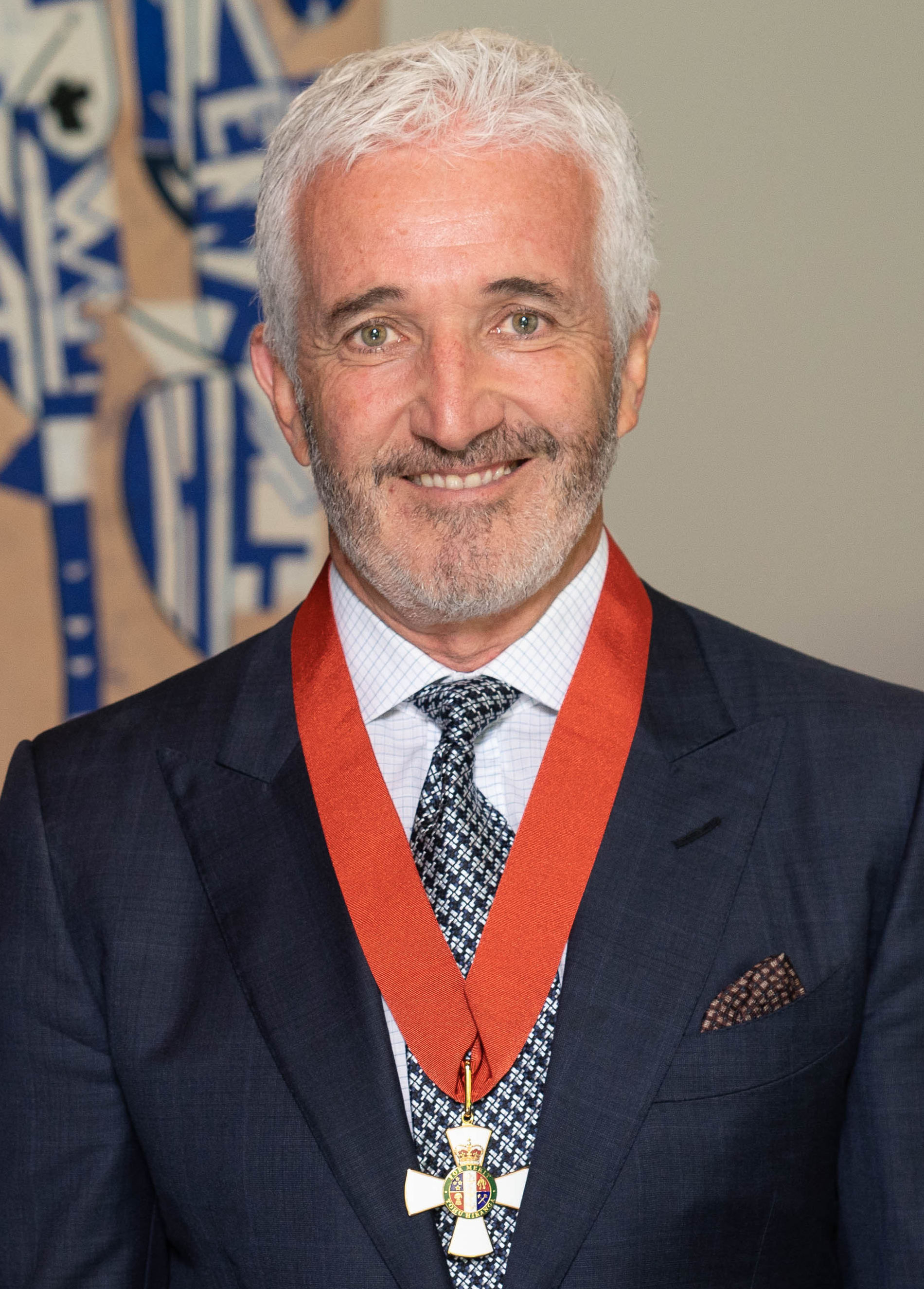
- Fyfe in 2021
- Born: Robert Ian Fyfe; 6 May 1961 (age 65); Christchurch, New Zealand
- Known for: Former CEO of Air New Zealand

Robert Ian Fyfe CNZM (born 6 May 1961) is a New Zealand businessman and a former chief executive officer (CEO) of New Zealand national airline Air New Zealand.

== Early life and education ==
Fyfe was born in Christchurch, joined the Royal New Zealand Air Force straight from high school, and earned a Bachelor of Engineering (Mechanical) honours from the University of Canterbury in 1982.

== Career ==
Fyfe rose to be Flight Commander in charge of maintenance of the Royal New Zealand Air Force’s No. 75 Skyhawk Squadron at the age of 24.

He held positions at Telecom, and Postbank. He was general manager of the Bank of New Zealand, chief operating officer of ITV Digital in the UK (which went into bankruptcy while he was at the helm) and group general manager of Air New Zealand.

Fyfe succeeded Ralph Norris as Air New Zealand CEO in 2005. He resigned as the airline's CEO as of 31 December 2012.

Fyfe was on the board of clothing designer and manufacturer Icebreaker from July 2012, and its executive chairman from September 2013.

On 28 November 2012, Fyfe was appointed to the board of Antarctica New Zealand. He took up the position in February 2013.

In late March 2020, Fyfe was appointed as a liaison between government and the private sector during the COVID-19 pandemic.

== Honours and awards ==
Fyfe was awarded an honorary doctorate of commerce from the University of Canterbury in April 2015.

In the 2021 New Year Honours, Fyfe was appointed a Companion of the New Zealand Order of Merit, for services to business and tourism.

In 2025, Fyfe was inducted into the New Zealand Business Hall of Fame, in recognition of his contributions to business and tourism.

== Personal life ==
He currently lives in Auckland, New Zealand.

Business positions
Preceded by Ralph Norris	Chief executive officer of Air New Zealand; 2005–2012	Succeeded by Christopher Luxon
