= ID Dunedin Fashion Week =

Annual fashion event in New Zealand

iD Dunedin Fashion Week is an annual festival of fashion held in the New Zealand South Island city of Dunedin. The festival has been held regularly since 1999, and is held in the southern autumn in March or April.

== Description ==
iD Dunedin is run by a not-for-profit charitable organisation, founded in 2000, in cooperation with Otago Polytechnic. Originally intended to focus on local fashion, it has since grown to include designers and designs from around the world. International guest designers have appeared during fashion week since 2010, with the first being British designer Zandra Rhodes. Other international guests have included Akira Isogawa and Stephen Jones.

Two major events are held during the week, the iD International Emerging Designer Awards and iD Dunedin Fashion Show. The latter was held from 2000 to 2017 at the Dunedin Railway Station, using the stations main platform as a catwalk, making it — at 120 metres (390 ft) — one of the world's longest fashion catwalks. The fashion show returned to the Dunedin Railway Station from 2023. The week has developed to include various other events including exhibitions and lectures.

The 2020 fashion awards were held online, due to the COVID-19 pandemic. No fashion week was held in either 2021 or 2022, for the same reason.

== Winners ==
=== iD International Emerging Designer Award ===
- 2009: Jonathan Stern (Israel)
- 2010: Igor Galas (Croatia)
- 2011: Kate Bolzonello (Australia)
- 2012: Carolina Barua (Australia)
- 2013: Rakel Blom (New Zealand)
- 2014: Mahshid Mahdian (Italy)
- 2015: Steve Hall (New Zealand)
- 2016: Jordan Anderson (Australia)
- 2017: Nehma Vitols (Australia)
- 2018: Damir Begović (Croatia)
- 2019: Rebecca Carrington (England)
- 2020: Stina Randestad (Sweden)
- 2021–22: no award
- 2023: Zong-Lin Liang (Taiwan)

== See also ==
- New Zealand Fashion Week
- List of fashion awards
