= Pania Tyson-Nathan =

New Zealand businesswoman

Toluma'anave Dame Pania Tyson-Nathan DNZM JP
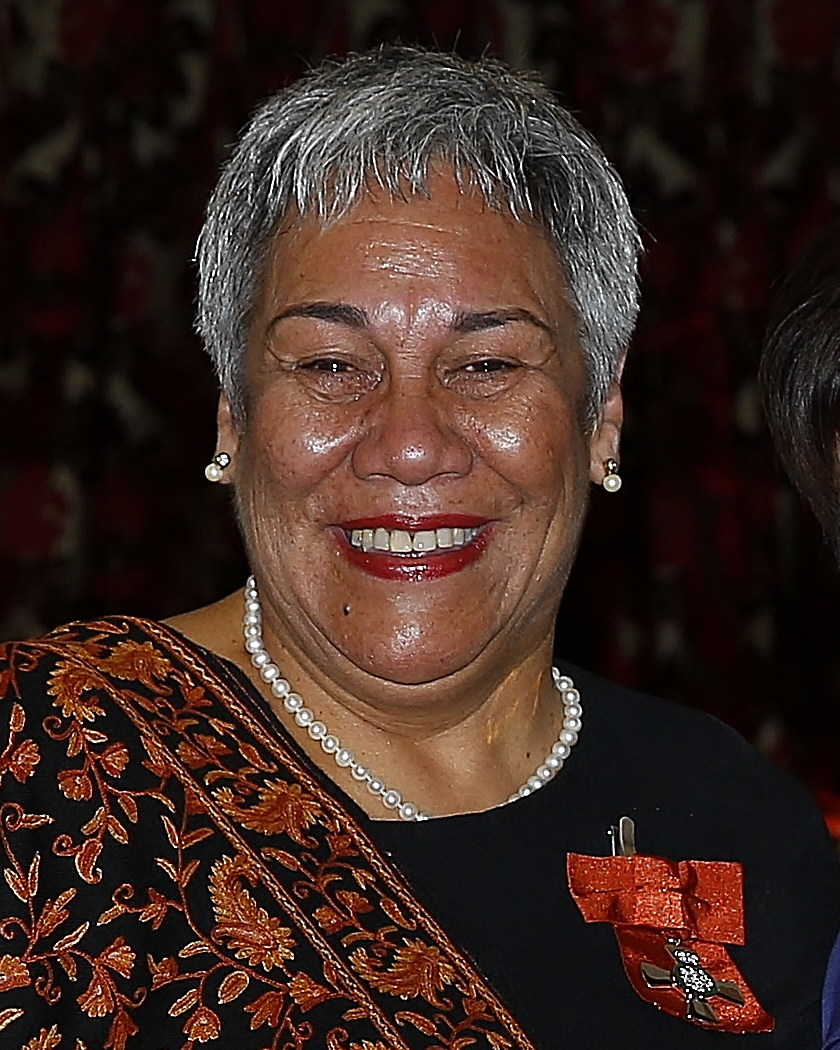
- Tyson-Nathan in 2018
- Born: Wellington
- Occupation: Businesswoman
- Known for: New Zealand Māori Tourism

Toluma'anave Dame Pania Tyson-Nathan DNZM JP is a New Zealand businesswoman who has served as the chief executive officer of New Zealand Māori Tourism since 2008. During her tenure, the value of the Māori tourism sector has increased from about $500 million to almost $2 billion.

Of Māori and Scottish descent, Tyson-Nathan affiliates to Ngāti Rongomaiwahine and grew up in the Hawke's Bay. She says that she inherited her work ethic from her parents, both of whom were local business owners in the region.

In the 2018 New Year Honours, Tyson-Nathan was appointed a Member of the New Zealand Order of Merit, for services to services to Māori and business. She was promoted to Dame Companion of the New Zealand Order of Merit, for services to Māori and business, in the 2024 New Year Honours.

In 2018, Tyson-Nathan received the University of Auckland's Māori Woman Business Leader award. At the 2020 Matariki Awards, she won Te Tupu-ā-Nuku award for business and innovation, and the following year she was named as one of the top 50 global tourism innovators. In 2022, Tyson-Nathan was inducted into the New Zealand Business Hall of Fame.
