= New Zealand Business Hall of Fame =

- Awarded for: Individuals who have made a significant contribution to the economic and social development of New Zealand
- Country: New Zealand
- First award: 1994
- Latest award: 2026
- Website: businesshalloffame.co.nz

The New Zealand Business Hall of Fame is a figurative hall of fame dedicated to New Zealanders who have made a significant contribution to the economic and social development of New Zealand. The hall was established in 1994 by the Young Enterprise Trust. Laureates are selected by an independent panel and are inducted at an annual gala dinner.

== Laureates ==
The following is a complete list of laureates of the New Zealand Business Hall of Fame, up to inductions on 6 August 2026.

Year	Laureate	Field(s)
1994	Woolf Fisher	Whiteware manufacturing
1994	James Fletcher	Construction
1994	William Goodfellow	Dairy industry
1994	Jack Newman	Transport
1994	Bryan Todd	Oil exploration
1994	James Wattie	Food processing
1995	Ted Friedlander	Clothes retailing
1995	Robert Kerridge	Cinemas
1995	Ken Myers	Liquor industry
1995	Cliff Plimmer	Stock and station agency
1995	William Stevenson	Civil engineering and infrastructure
1995	Robertson Stewart	Plastics
1996	Jack Butland	Food processing
1996	Chew Chong	Fungus exporting and buttermaking
1996	Richard Izard	Saw-blade manufacturing
1996	John McKenzie	Retailing
1996	Bob Owens	Transport
1996	Angus Tait	Telecommunications
1997	John Anderson	Engineering
1997	John Logan Campbell	Commerce
1997	Tom Clark	Ceramics
1997	Assid Abraham Corban	Wine
1997	James Fletcher Jr.	Industry
1997	Robert Hannah	Footwear
1997	James Maddren	Deer industry and commerce
1997	Alfred Hamish Reed	Book publishing
1997	Frank Renouf	Merchant banking
1997	Thomas Russell	Investment and law
1998	Harcourt Caughey	Department store retailing and public service
1998	Te Puea Hērangi	Māori development
1998	Ray Hurley	Lingerie manufacturing
1998	Henry Kelliher	Brewing
1998	Graeme Marsh	Manufacturing and business leadership
1998	Maurice Paykel	Whiteware manufacturing
1999	Robert Graham	Tourism
1999	Johnny Jones	Whaling, farming and shipping
1999	Nathaniel Levin	Trading, and stock and station agency
1999	Don McLaren	Animal remedies and racing
1999	Āpirana Ngata	Māori development
1999	Laurie Stevens	Textiles and manufacturing
1999	Ron Trotter	Business leadership
1999	Rodolph Wigley	Tourism
2000	Francis Carter	Sawmilling and timber merchandising
2000	Edward Elworthy	Farming and meat processing
2000	Alexander Harvey	Manufacturing
2000	James Hay	Department store retailing
2000	Amy Maria Hellaby	Meat processing and retailing
2000	Robert Holt	Sawmilling and timber merchandising
2000	Robert Laidlaw	Department store retailing
2000	Cliff Skeggs	Fishing and transport
2001	Heaton Barker	Grocery
2001	Harry Horrocks	Pulp and paper industry
2001	John Horrocks	Transport and commercial law
2001	Brian Picot	Supermarketing and education reform
2001	Geoffrey Roberts	Commercial aviation
2001	Peter Shirtcliffe	Business management and enterprise education
2002	Tom Ah Chee	Supermarketing
2002	Romeo Bragato	Viticulture
2002	Don Brash	Central banking
2002	Richard Carter	Forestry
2002	Peter Masfen	Investment
2002	Tim Wallis	Aviation and deer industry
2003	Peter Barr	Accountancy
2003	Robert Forsyth Barr	Sharebroking
2003	John Goulter	Airport administration
2003	Frank Holmes	Oil entrepreneurship
2003	Douglas Myers	Brewing
2003	Wilson Whineray	Rugby and business leadership
2004	Eion Edgar	Sharebroking
2004	Peter Elworthy	Farming and business leadership
2004	Bill Gallagher	Electric fences and business leadership
2004	Bill Hamilton	Jet boats
2004	Howard Paterson	Entrepreneurship and biotechnology
2004	Wendy Pye	Children's publishing and literacy
2005	James Doig	Industry
2005	Pat Goodman	Baking and entrepreneurship
2005	Bill Richardson	Transport
2005	Gil Simpson	Software
2005	Stephen Tindall	Discount retailing
2005	Harvey Turner	Horticulture and auctioneering
2006	William Davidson	Agribusiness
2006	Keith Hay	House building and public service
2006	Michael Hill	Jewellery retailing
2006	Richard Hudson	Baking and confectionery
2006	Neville Jordan	Technology entrepreneurship
2006	David Levene	Retailing
2007	William Gregg	Coffee
2007	Neil Isaac	Construction engineering and conservation
2007	Johannes La Grouw	Housebuilding
2007	Len Malaghan	Ice-cream manufacturing and medical research
2007	Neal Plowman	Textile and laundry services
2007	Trevor Scott	Business leadership and biotechnology
2008	Alan Burnet	Newspaper publishing
2008	Shariffe Coory	Business and community leadership
2008	Tony Falkenstein	Entrepreneurship and business education
2008	George Fenwick	Newspaper publishing and social reform
2008	Ron Jarden	Rugby and sharebroking
2008	Joseph Nathan	Dairy entrepreneurship
2008	Hugh Perrett	Grocery strategy and retail innovation
2008	Rod Weir	Stock and station leadership
2009	George Beca	Engineering consultancy
2009	Ron Carter	Engineering consultancy and business leadership
2009	Roderick Deane	Corporate leadership
2009	Ted Lees	Heavy equipment
2009	John Plimmer	Construction and investment
2009	Marianne Smith	Drapery and philanthropy
2010	Ernest Davis	Brewing, public service and philanthropy
2010	Douglas Goodfellow	Resource investment and philanthropy
2010	Bendix Hallenstein	Clothes manufacturing, public service and philanthropy
2010	John Ilott	Advertising and philanthropy
2010	Peter Leitch	Meat retailing and philanthropy
2010	Roy Savage	Safety equipment and philanthropy
2011	Thomas Cawthron	Shipping agencies, investment contracting and philanthropy
2011	Les Hutchins	Tourism and conservation
2011	Ann and David Norman	Jewellery retailing, department store retailing and philanthropy
2011	Brian Perry	Civil engineering and philanthropy
2011	Percy Sargood	Merchant and philanthropy
2011	John Todd	Energy, investment and philanthropy
2012	Graeme Douglas	Pharmaceuticals
2012	Bill Gallagher	Agribusiness
2012	Pat Higgins	Construction
2012	Graeme Lowe	Agribusiness
2012	Thomas Macarthy	Brewing and investment
2012	Mary Jane Milne	Millinery and drapery
2013	John Anderson	Banking
2013	Val Barfoot	Real estate
2013	George Fistonich	Winemaking
2013	Colin Giltrap	Motor industry
2013	Hugh Green	Civil construction
2013	Mary Jane Innes	Brewing
2013	Dryden Spring	Agriculture
2013	Maurice Thompson	Real estate
2014	Graeme Avery	Publishing, food and wine, and sport
2014	Jules Fulton	Roading and infrastructure
2014	David Henry	Forestry and wood processing
2014	Bob Hogan	Roading and infrastructure
2014	James McAlpine	Refrigeration
2014	Ralph Norris	Leadership and governance
2014	Don Rowlands	Leadership and governance
2014	Adrienne Stewart	Leadership and governance
2015	Annie Cleland Millar	Food services and manufacturing
2015	Neville Crichton	Motor industry and superyacht industry
2015	Chris Mace	Construction and investment
2015	Lloyd Morrison	Investment
2015	Alison Paterson	Governance
2015	Russell Pettigrew	Transport and logistics
2015	William and George Winstone	Quarrying and cartage
2016	Philip Burdon	Food production, business leadership and public policy
2016	Rob Fenwick	Environmental leadership
2016	Noel Holyoake	Heating, ventilation and air conditioning
2016	Peter Jackson	Film
2016	Malcolm McConnell	Engineering
2016	Bruce Plested	Global logistics and transportation
2016	Ward Reid	Rubber industry
2016	John Roberts	Leadership and industry
2017	Thomas Edmonds	Food manufacture and commerce
2017	Graeme Harrison	Meat industry, food, beverage, agribusiness and export
2017	John and Leonie Hynds	Manufacturing, engineering and infrastructure
2017	George Methven	Engineering and manufacturing
2017	Mavis Mullins	Māori business development and governance
2017	David Nathan	Commerce, property and import / export
2017	Charles Sew Hoy	Gold mining, merchant and entrepreneurship
2017	Pam Williams	Fishing industry, export, aviation and commerce
2018	Bill Buckley	Manufacturing
2018	Trelise Cooper	Fashion design
2018	James Dilworth	Business
2018	Alan Gibbs	Manufacturing and investment banking
2018	Elspeth Kennedy	Stockbroking, governance and philanthropy
2018	Russell Matthews	Civil engineering
2018	Tony Nightingale	Manufacturing
2018	Graeme and Craig Turner	Manufacturing
2019	John Ballantyne	Retail
2019	John and David Bayley	Real estate
2019	Bernie and Kaye Crosby	Food
2019	John Davies	Tourism
2019	Jane Hunter	Winemaking
2019	Samuel Nichol	Merchandise and shipping
2019	Noel Robinson	Manufacturing and commerce
2019	Mark Waller	Healthcare and governance
2020	Robert Anderson	Commercial enterprise
2020	Peri Drysdale	Fashion and manufacturing
2020	Tracy Gough	Engineering services
2020	Kevin Hickman	Care and health services
2020	Brendan Lindsay	Food storage
2020	Paul Morgan	Māori enterprise
2020	John Ryder	Care and health services
2020	Ken Stevens	Systems innovation
2020	James Henry Whittaker	Confectionery
2022	Ulu Aiono	Technology and community health
2022	Charles and Jessie Begg	Music
2022	Graeme Hart	Investment
2022	Bruce McLaren	Engineering
2022	Les, Jackie and Phillip Mills	Health and fitness
2022	Greg Tomlinson	Investment
2022	Pania Tyson-Nathan	Tourism
2023	Paul Adams	Property development
2023	Michael Barnett	Business
2023	Theresa Gattung	Female advancement and entrepreneurship
2023	Ted Manson	Property development and social equity
2023	Kingi Smiler	Māori agribusiness and primary sector
2023	Wally Stone	Tourism
2023	Kelly Tarlton	Tourism
2024	Rod Duke	Retailing
2024	Mark Dunajtschik	Engineering, property and philanthropy
2024	Diane Foreman	Entrepreneurship
2024	Owen Glenn	Business and philanthropy
2024	Todd Heller	Food production
2024	Ranjna Patel	Community empowerment
2024	Ian Taylor	Technology
2025	Alan Bougen	Health and wellness
2025	Rod Drury	Technology
2025	Rob Fyfe	Business and tourism
2025	Lynnette and Shane McManaway	Agribusiness and community
2025	Hinerangi Raumati	Māori business
2025	Catherine Savage	Business and governance
2025	Joan Withers	Business and governance
2026	Naomi Ballantyne	Insurance
2026	Michael Daniell	Medical technology
2026	Carmel Fisher	Investment
2026	David Irving	Business and entrepreneurship
2026	Rob McLeod	Taxation and Māori business
2026	Rosanne Meo	Business and governance
2026	Tom Sturgess	Business and philanthropy
