= Adrienne Stewart =

New Zealand arts patron (born 1936)

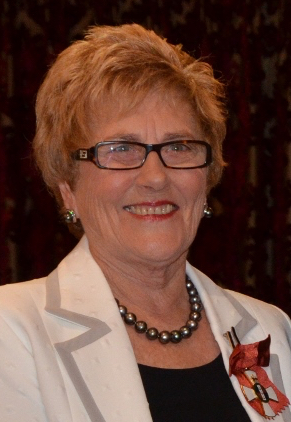
Stewart in 2015

Dame Ellen Adrienne Stewart, Lady Stewart DNZM QSM (née Peake; born 1936) is a New Zealand arts patron.

== Life and career ==
Ellen Adrienne Peake was born in Melbourne, Australia, in 1936. She moved to New Zealand aged 19 and first worked in Wellington and Auckland. In 1958, at age 22, she started working for PDL as personal secretary to Bob Stewart, who had purchased the firm the previous year.

Stewart divorced his first wife and in 1970, Ellen Adrienne Cansdale (who had by then been married before) married Bob Stewart and took on his surname. The Stewarts developed PDL into one of New Zealand's best known companies, and they became major exporters. Adrienne Stewart became deeply involved in the arts sector, where she is a "patron, supporter, board member and philanthropist".

== Awards and honours ==
In the 1979 New Year Honours, her husband was appointed Knight Bachelor, and she was thus styled Adrienne, Lady Stewart. In 1993, she was awarded the New Zealand Suffrage Centennial Medal. In the 1995 Queen's Birthday Honours, Stewart was awarded the Queen's Service Medal for community service. In the 2006 New Year Honours, she was appointed an Officer of the New Zealand Order of Merit for services to the community. In 2011, she was awarded an honorary doctorate of letters (LittD) by the University of Canterbury. In 2014, Stewart was inducted into the New Zealand Business Hall of Fame. In the 2015 New Year Honours, she was appointed Dame Companion of the New Zealand Order of Merit (DNZM) for services to the arts and business.

== Family ==
The Stewarts had two children; Mark James Stewart and Todd Huntly Stewart. Her husband died in 2007.
