= Annie Cleland Millar =

New Zealand businesswoman

Annie Cleland Millar (15 March 1855 – 25 March 1939) was a New Zealand businesswoman. She was born on 15 March 1855. In 2015, she was posthumously inducted into the New Zealand Business Hall of Fame.
