= Thomas Macarthy =

New Zealand brewer

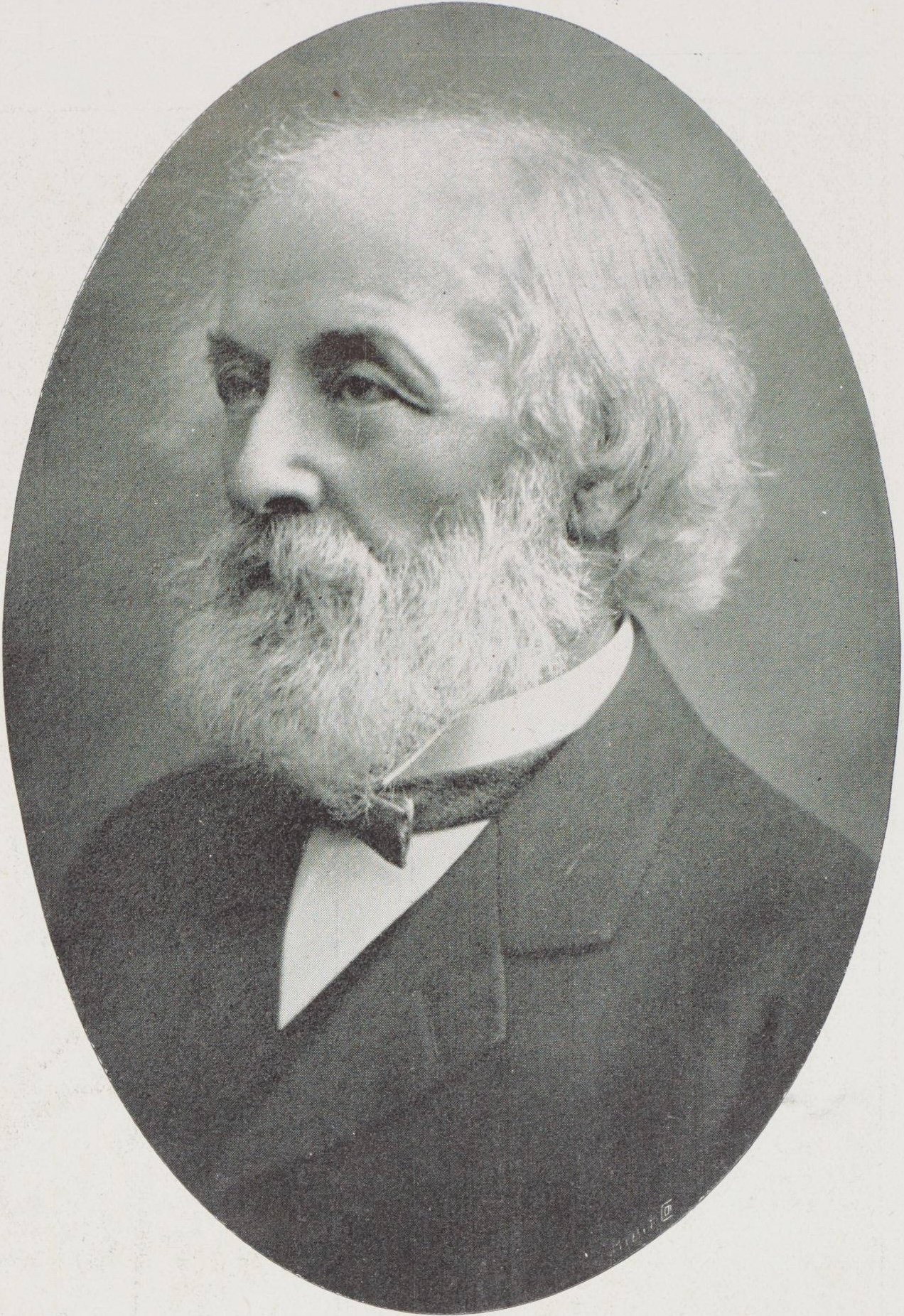
- Born: Thomas George Macarthy c. 1833; London, England
- Died: 19 August 1912 (aged 79); Wellington, New Zealand
- Occupations: Brewer; businessman

Thomas George Macarthy (c. 1833 – 19 August 1912) was a New Zealand brewer and benefactor. He was born in London, England, in about 1833 and died in 1912 in Wellington, New Zealand.

Macarthy died childless and his substantial business interests were put into a trust for educational purposes. When prohibition was an issue in the 1920s, the trust's continued maintenance of his brewing business was attacked by Robert Stout.

In 2012, Macarthy was posthumously inducted into the New Zealand Business Hall of Fame.
