= Alan Hellaby =

New Zealand businessman

Sir Frederick Reed Alan Hellaby (21 December 1926 – 19 May 2001) was a New Zealand businessman. He was managing director of R. & W. Hellaby, a major meat industry company co-founded by his grandfather Richard Hellaby. In the 1981 Queen's Birthday Honours, he was appointed a Knight Bachelor, for services to the meat industry and the community.

Hellaby died of bowel cancer in Auckland on 19 May 2001.
