= William Winstone =

New Zealand businessman (1843–1924)

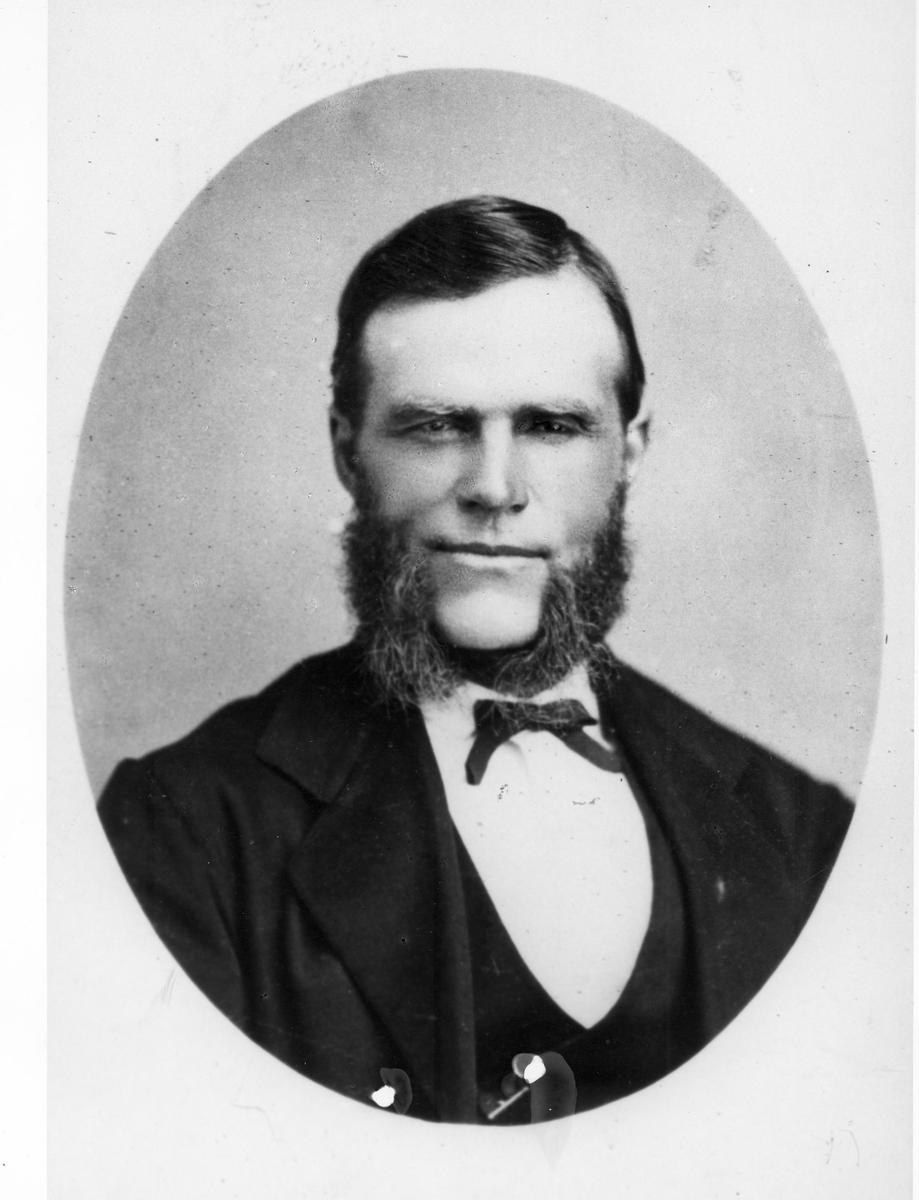

Personal details
- Born: 1 June 1843 Barrow Gurney, Somerset, England
- Died: 23 June 1924 (aged 81) Auckland, New Zealand
- Spouses: Ellen Sperrin (m. 1859–1904) Jane Robinson (m. 1916)
- Children: 2
- Occupation: Businessman

William Winstone (1 June 1843 – 23 June 1924) was a prominent early Auckland businessman who emigrated to New Zealand from England in 1859. He co-founded the company that evolved into Winstone Aggregates (still operating as of 2026) alongside his brother, George Winstone. Their haulage, quarrying and building supply business was involved in major Auckland city building projects during the late 19th century.

== Early years ==
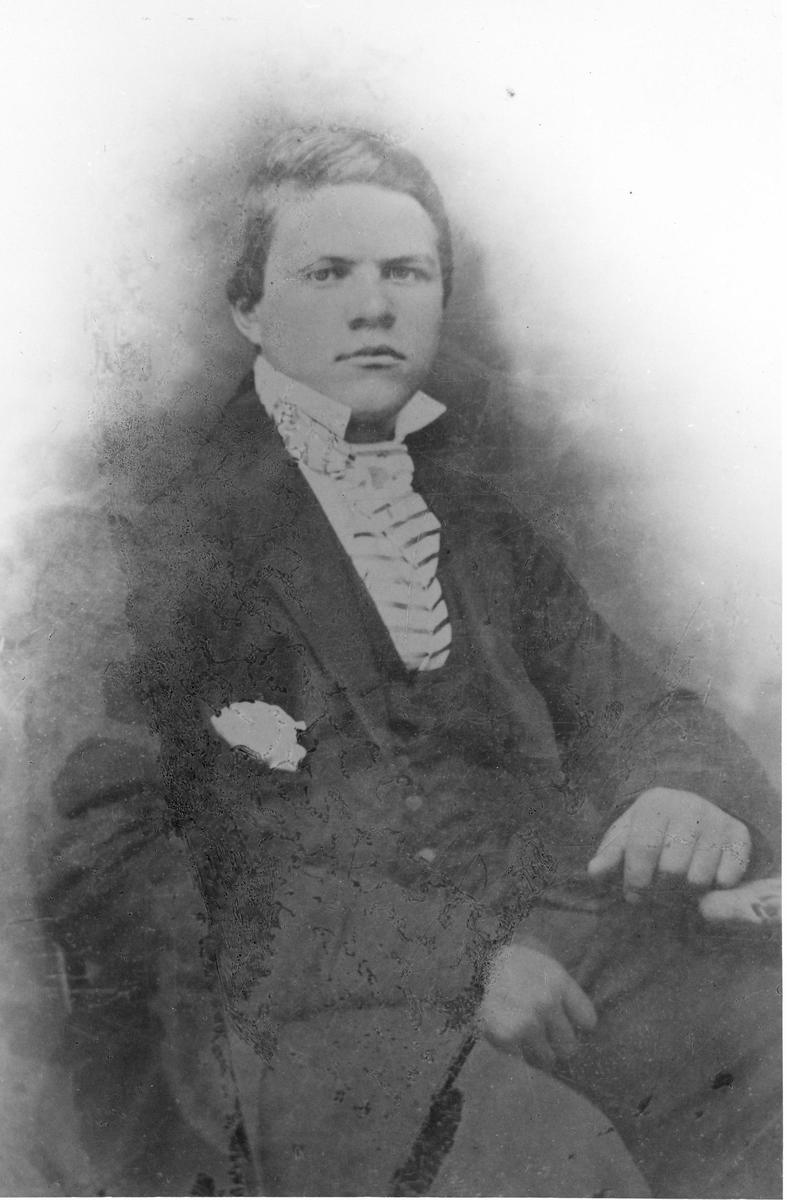
William on his wedding day, 1859

William Winstone was born to parents Charles Winstone and Mary Winstone (née Vowles) at Hodders' Farm in Barrow Gurney, Somersetshire, on 1 June 1843. He grew up working on the family farm, and gained experience handling horses, which would be an interest that continued throughout his life. He was educated at Failand School. In 1859 at age sixteen, he married Ellen Sperrin of Backwell, Somersetshire, his twenty-eight-year-old ex-school teacher. He left England to avoid the family farming occupation.

=== Arrival in New Zealand ===
On 3 June 1859, William Winstone departed from Gravesend for New Zealand on the 805-tonne ship Spray of the Ocean. He left with thirty shillings to his name, and this was divided between him and a fellow emigrant while onboard. Winstone arrived in Auckland after 86 days at sea, on 1 September 1859. It was not a prosperous period in the fledgling Auckland city, with little work available. He quickly took a job planting potatoes. He left the city to work as a teamster for a year at a farm in Drury, south of Auckland. He worked with horses, ploughed and did other manual labour including drain digging. He continued working on South Auckland farms for the next few years, before moving back to the city.

=== New Zealand Wars ===
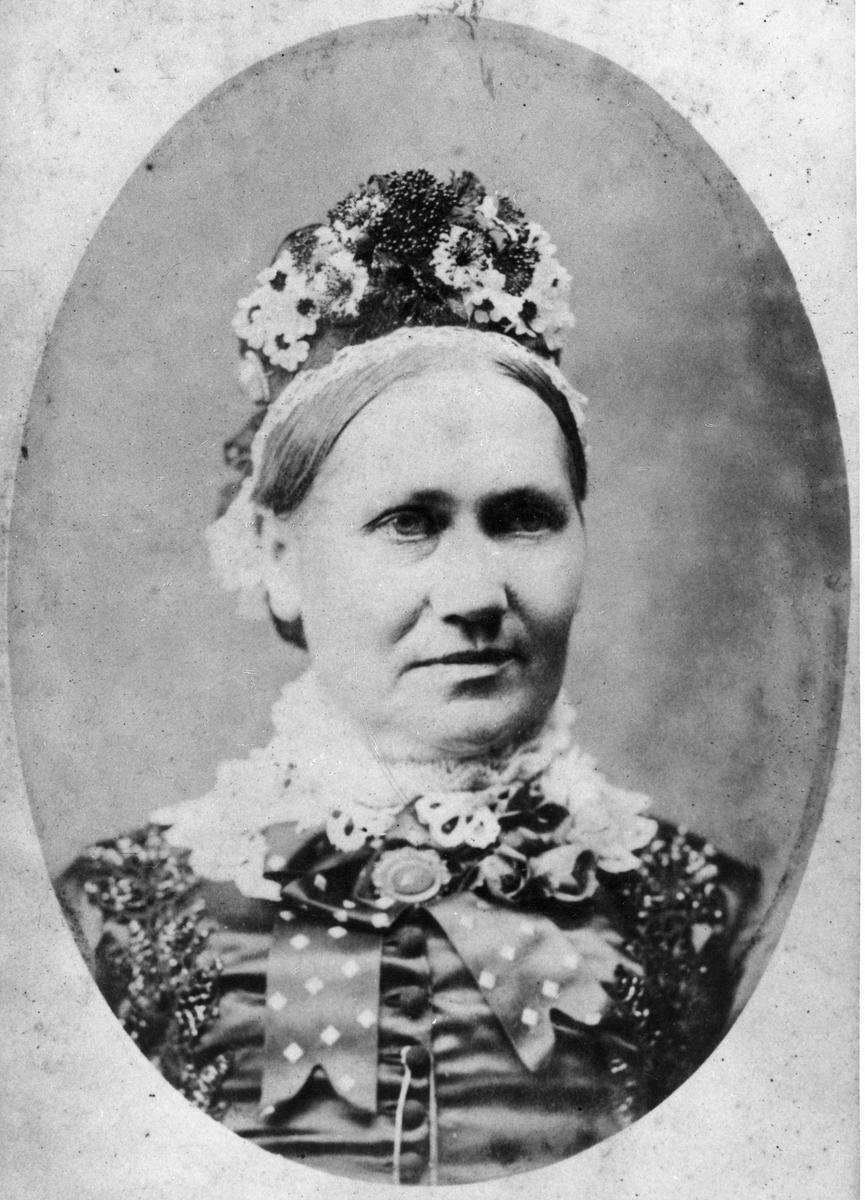
Ellen Winstone circa 1880

Upon the Waikato invasion of 1863 during the New Zealand Land Wars, Winstone was back in Auckland city trying to get into the "carrying trade", providing haulage by horse and cart. Able-bodied men in Auckland aged 16 to 60 were called up to join the local militia, which included the then twenty year old Winstone. He received military training and was part of the militia for six months, before being seconded to a new transportation posting carting supplies between Auckland and the Waikato River at Mercer. The convoy of horses and carts travelled through rough track in the bush over two days, first from Auckland to Drury, and the next day the team continued over the Razorback to Mercer. Winstone recounted transporting an iron screw steamer in 1863, the Gymnotus, with a team of 14 horses and a timber wagon. The vessel was the first privately owned steamer on the Waikato river, and transported cargo for the military during the Waikato action. During Winstone's time transporting goods for the militia, his wife Ellen and infant daughter Eliza Annie (who would be their only biological child) arrived in New Zealand.

== Business ==
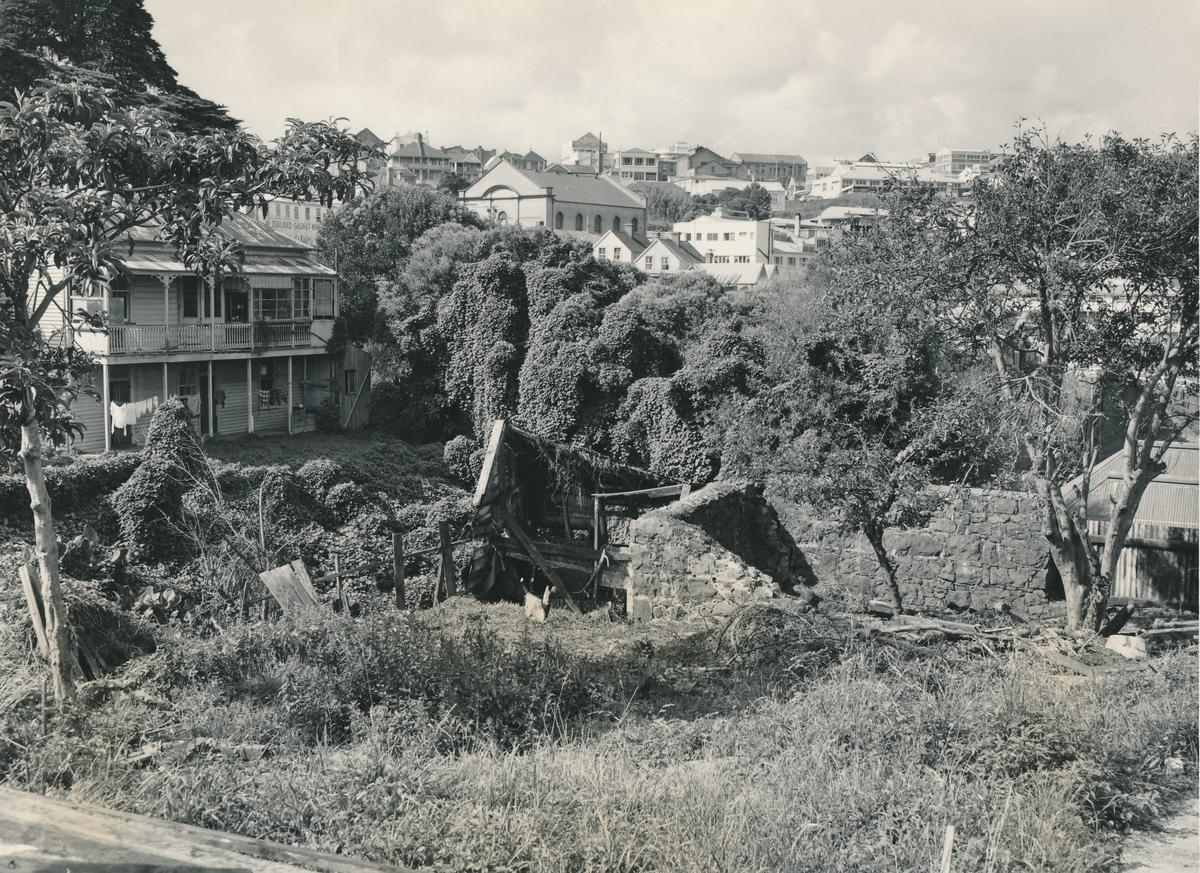
Remains of the stables behind Winstone's Hayden Street home

At the end of the Waikato war in 1864, Winstone had started working as a coal merchant and carrier. His one-man operation with a horse and cart quickly expanded alongside the city of Auckland, and he began to employ staff and accumulate a growing fleet of horses and carts. The Winstone family lived at 12 Hayden Street, Newton, Auckland, with stables and driver accommodation on the property. Ellen Winstone was tasked with providing meals for the drivers. In 1867, Winstone temporarily shifted some of his operations to Thames when the gold rush drew business away from Auckland.

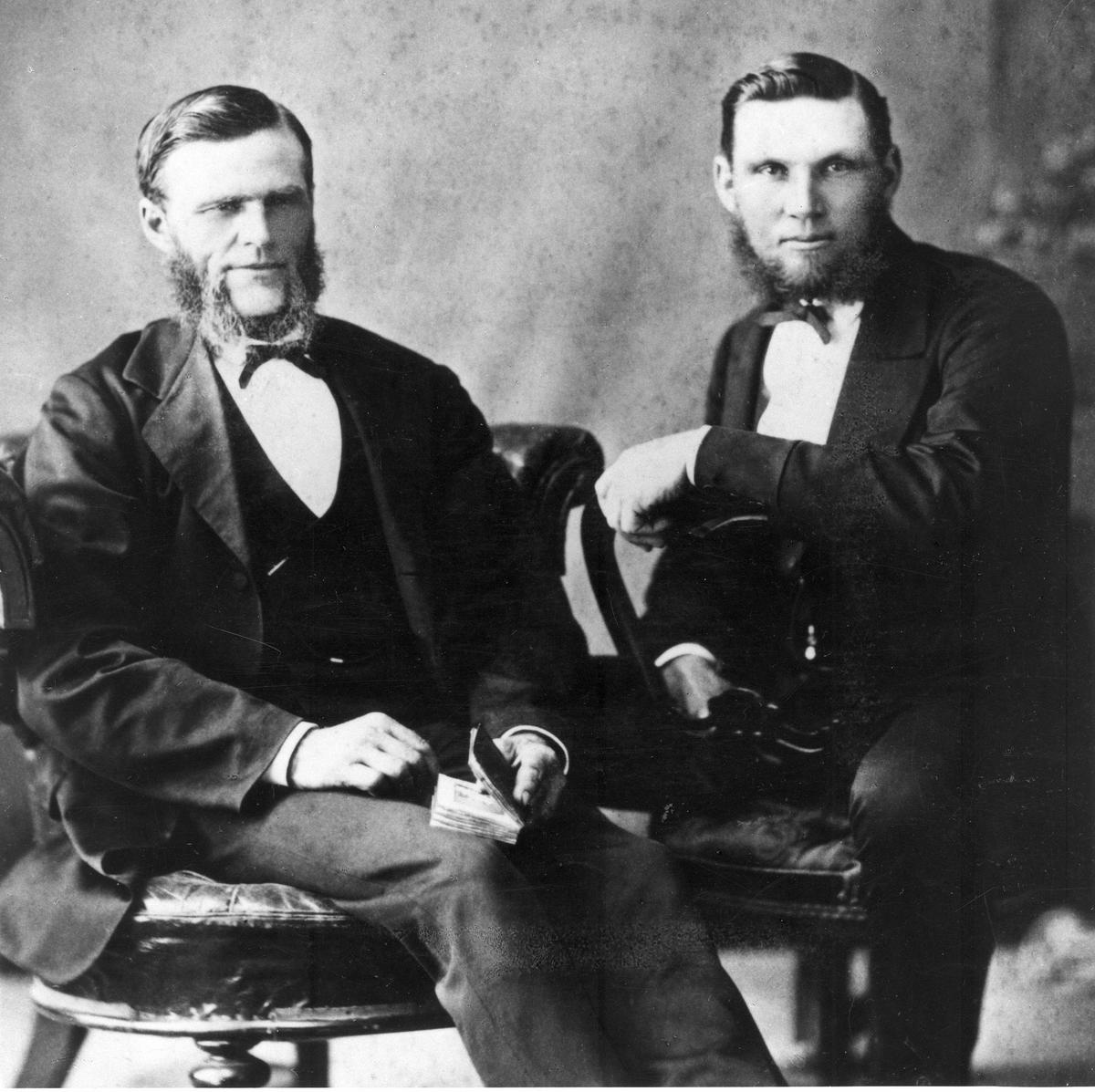
Winstone brothers circa 1880

=== W. & G. Winstone ===
George Winstone was the younger brother of William Winstone. Like William, he left England at a young age, and sailed on the ship Mangerton to Queensland when he was 13 to work at his cousin's Mr Foote's shop in Ipswitch. In 1869, after working as a storekeeper for 8 years in Australia, George took up an invitation by William to come to Auckland and join his carrying business. They formed a partnership shortly after George's arrival, creating W. & G. Winstone Limited with a pooled capital of £630. William started out with an eighty percent share to George's twenty percent, but it later shifted to a fifty-fifty split.

=== Quarry accident ===
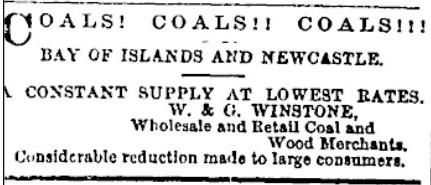
Business advertisement from 1875

William Winstone suffered severe injuries in a quarry accident on 22 February 1870, not long after George's arrival. Winstone was quarrying basalt at the Mount Eden quarry, intended for the Auckland Stock Exchange building on Queen Street, which would be one of the most impressive commercial buildings of late colonial Auckland. The accident happened when the blasting powder he and his employee, Benjamin Thomas, were using ignited unexpectedly, and they were caught in the resulting explosion. Winstone was closest to the explosives, and the explosive powder got in his face and eyes, his left hand and arm were injured, and his leg badly cut. Thomas was also severely injured, having received a blow to the head. Winstone was briefly presumed dead by the first responders. A doctor, Mr Pierce, quickly arrived on the scene and attended to the men's injuries. It was hoped Winstone would not lose his eyesight following the accident, but he became blind in one eye, and lost half his vision in the other.

It took two years for William to recover, nursed back to health by Ellen. Some sources suggest he travelled to England for specialist eye care in this period. William's involvement with the company's horses did not cease during his recovery, and he won first prize at the 1872 New Zealand Agricultural Society Show for his 5 and 6 year old team of heavy carting horses. That year, Ellen's 10-year-old nephew Frederick Brock Winstone arrived in New Zealand aboard the Caduceus, and William and Ellen adopted him as their son. Frederick would join the company in 1880 after leaving school, and worked his way up to managing director and secretary of the company in 1904.

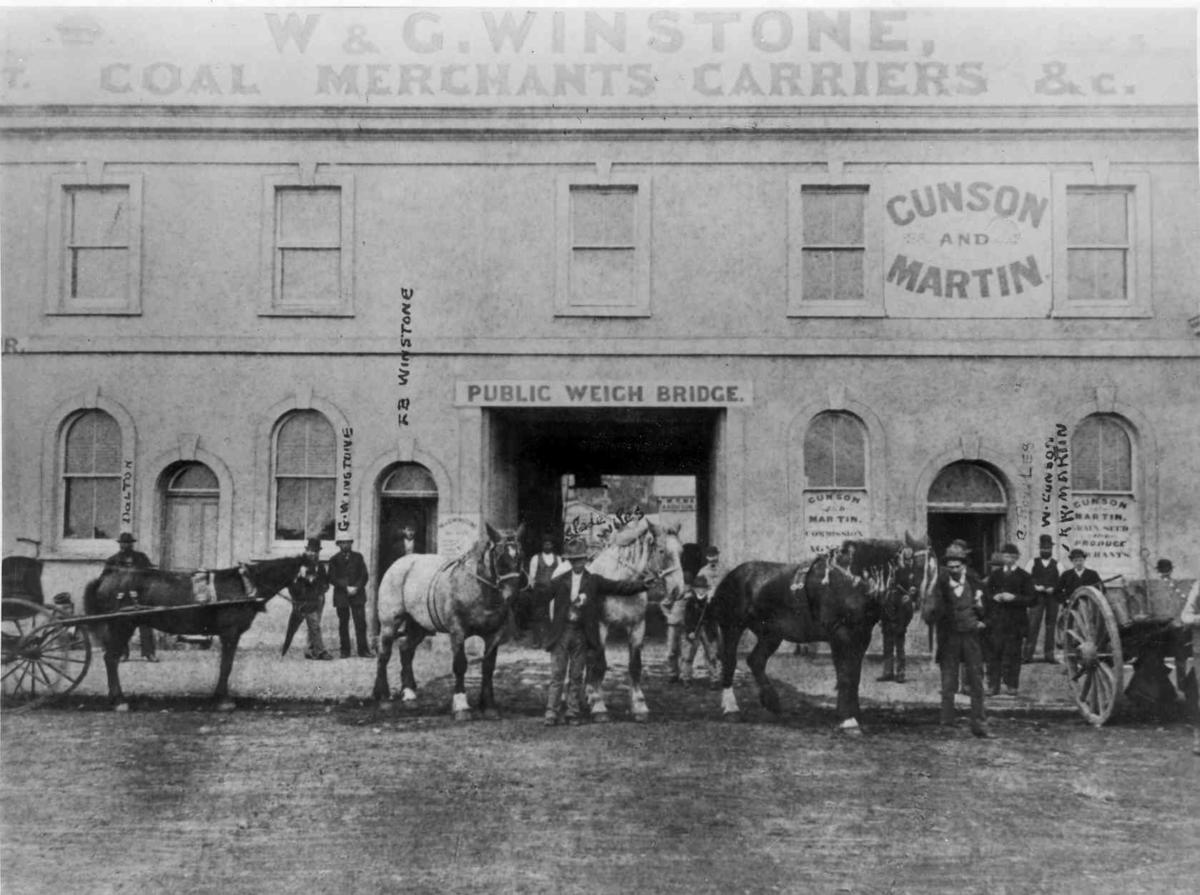
Custom House Street offices of W. & G. Winstone circa 1900

The 1870s proved to be a profitable decade for W. & G. Winstone Ltd despite the flagging New Zealand economy. This was due in part to the company winning government carting contracts in Premier Julius Vogel's public works schemes, and supplying building materials. They provided haulage for the flattening and reclamation of Point Britomart. In 1874 William and George signed an 85 year lease for two Custom House Street properties and built a double-fronted two-storey company building divided by a public weigh bridge. They occupied the left half of the property, and leased the right half to grain merchants Gunson and Martin. That year, George Winstone married merchant Robert Martin's sister, Mary Elizabeth Martin.

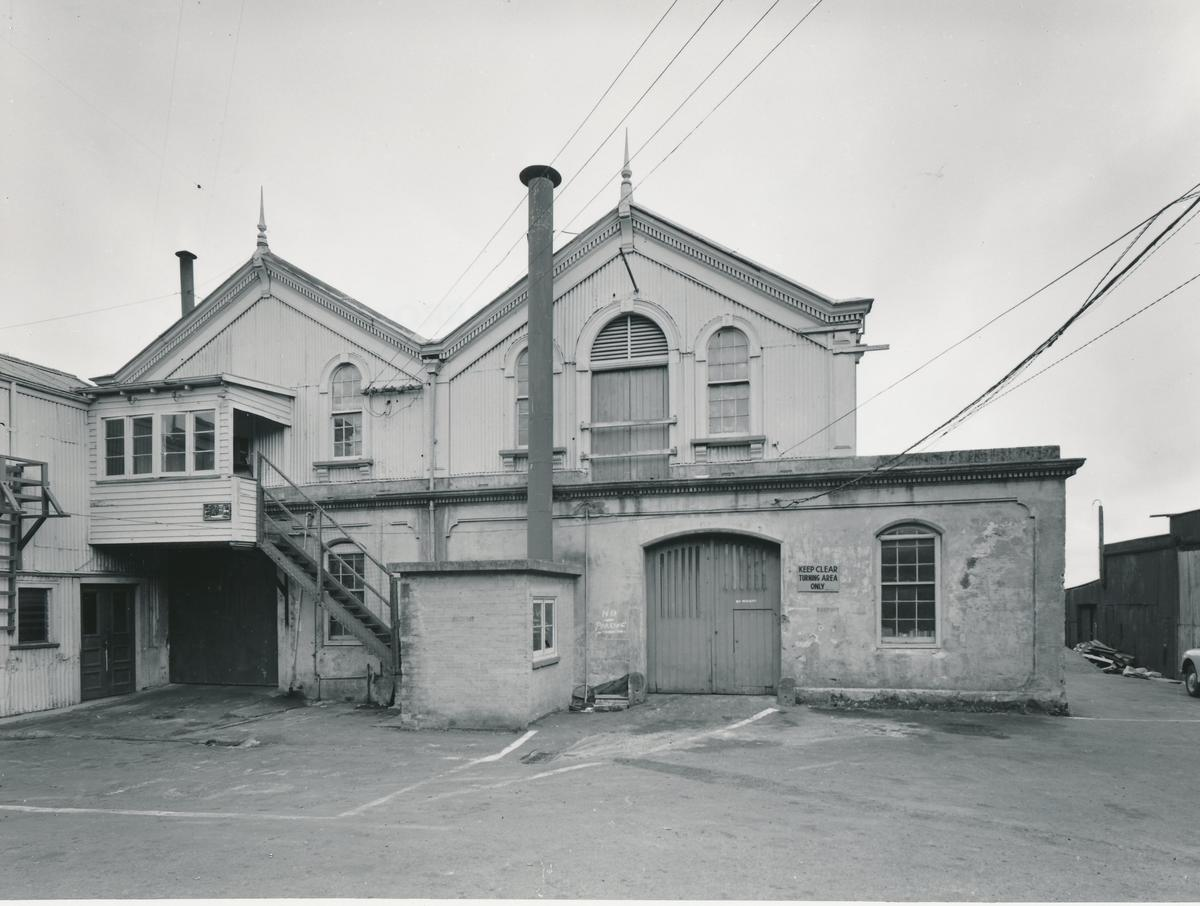
Stables as of 1961

=== Stables & Failand ===
In 1882, William Winstone bought a large block of Mount Albert land from Edward Allen. He would build and shift two homes on this land later in the decade, but likely used it for paddocks to rest the company horses before George set aside 8 hectares of his Mount Roskill farm for the purpose in 1900. William and George purchased land on upper Symonds Street after the stabling at William's Hayden Street home reached capacity, and built a much larger stable complex.

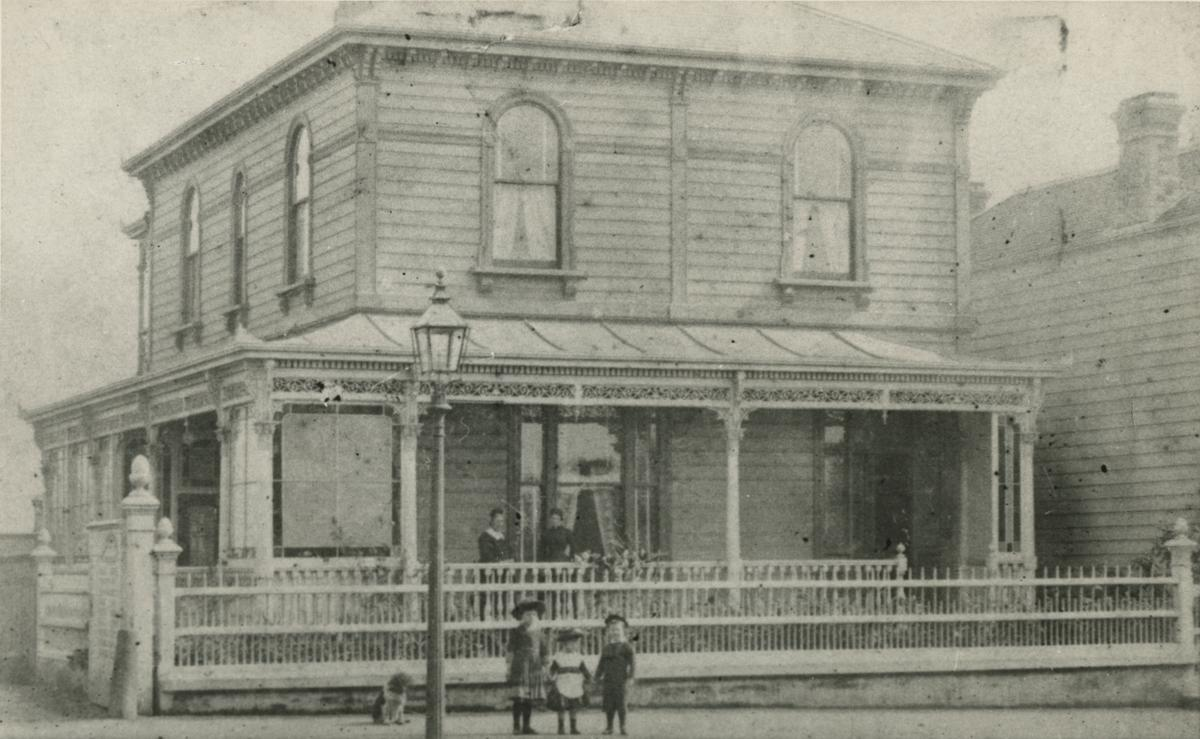
Failand circa 1886

The main building of the stables was constructed in 1883, and featured concrete floors, a drainage system, and an upper floor to store horse feed. It was designed by architect Robert Watt. The building initially housed 30 Clydesdales, and the working complex was built around it, becoming home to around 200 horses. Six stablehands lived onsite at the rear of the stables, and William Winstone built his villa called 'Failand' in 1882, situated in front of the stables, facing out onto Symonds street. The stables were designed to match Failand's Italianate design. Failand was a two-storey weatherboard residence constructed in two sections screwed together in order for it to be relocatable. It was built with kauri, featuring a grand staircase and entry hall.

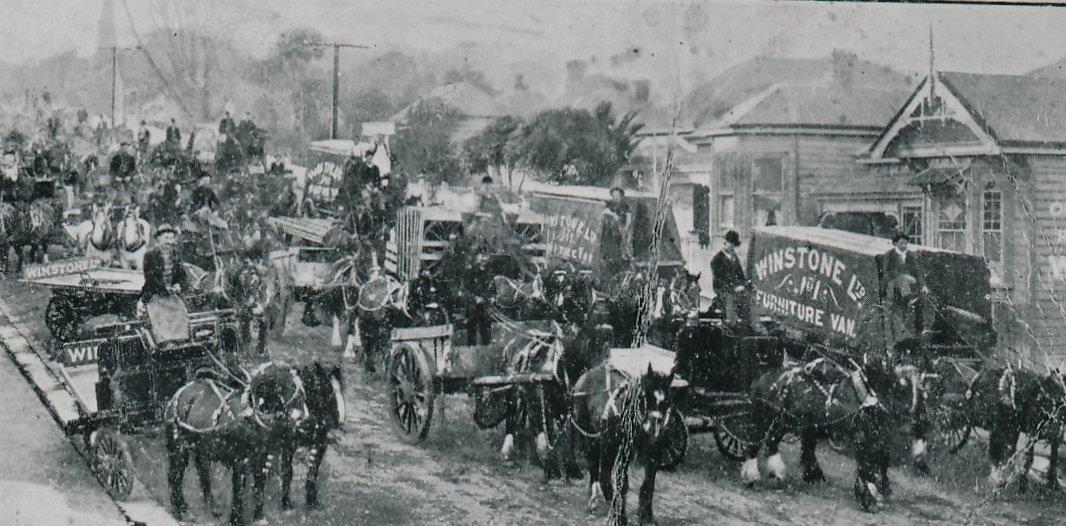
Procession of Winstone vehicles along Symonds Street circa 1895

The Symonds Street complex continued to grow along with the business, and by 1895, stored 24 drays, 5 furniture vans, 4 spring top carts, 2 flat top trolleys, 1 timber wagon, jinker, and flat top cart, and stabled the associated horses.

== Later life ==
In 1896, aged 53, William Winstone went into an early retirement, leaving his brother George at the helm, and the next generation of Winstones rising through the ranks of the company. William's son Frederick Winstone was made partner in W. & G. Winstone Ltd, announced in the New Zealand Herald in June 1896. William remained active in the business, and stayed on as one of the joint directors until his death. He removed Failand from Symonds Street to his land at Mount Albert that year, separating the two halves and transporting them on bullock drays to the new section on the corner of modern day Summit and Stilwell streets.

In his retirement William retained his love and involvement of the company horses, and according to his great-granddaughter, would sometimes "harness up a team and plough a field just to enjoy the feel of working in tandem with the horses." He also took to growing grapes in his hothouse at Mount Albert. This was noted in Auckland society pages when William and Ellen visited the Constable Luke Macdonnell, a sick ex-employee who had worked for Winstone as his first job. Winstone reportedly offered to send him some of his grapes, and host him as a guest at Mount Albert. William also became a member of the Mount Albert Road Board after joining in 1899.

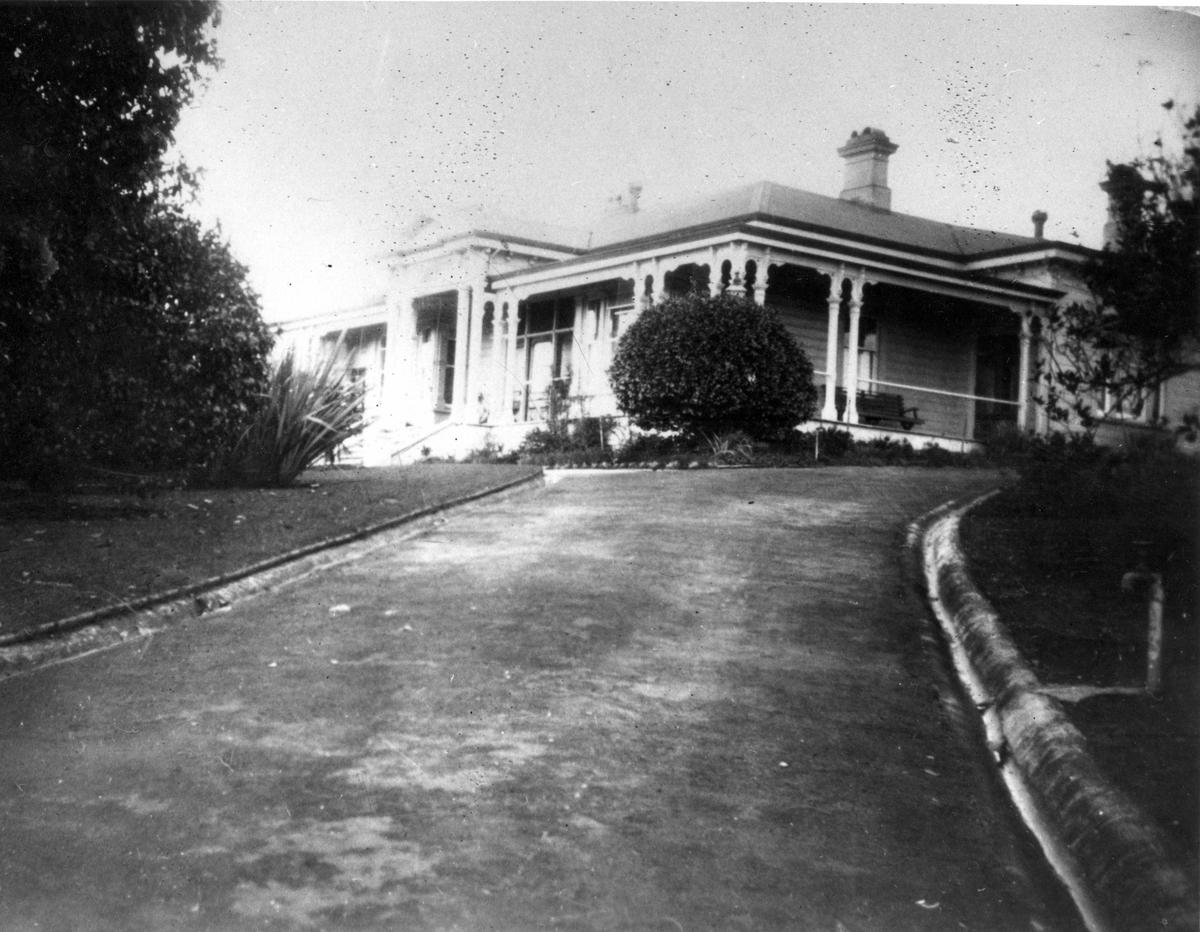
Tyntesfield circa 1900

=== Tyntesfield ===
Winstone moved his daughter Annie into Failand during her first marriage to Alfred Acey Stephenson, while William and Ellen moved into the newly constructed single-storey home called Tyntesfield for their retirement years.

The year 1904 was a time of great change in William Winstone's life. Ellen, his wife of forty-five years, died aged 73, on 22 October 1904. The partnership of W. & G. Winstone Ltd was dissolved, and a new company created, called Winstone Ltd. William and George senior were company directors, alongside Frederick Winstone and George's two sons Percy and George. A far cry from the financial situation the brother's partnership had begun with, Winstone Ltd started out with a capital of £20,000, and a yearly turnover of £56,000.

=== Final years ===
William Winstone remarried twelve years after the death of his wife Ellen, much to the family's surprise. On 7 June 1916, 73-year-old Winstone married 39-year-old Jane Robinson in a ceremony performed by Reverend C. H. Garland at Tyntesfield.

In April 1919, William's son Frederick Brock Winstone died suddenly of a heart attack. He had been acting manager of Winstone Ltd for several years.

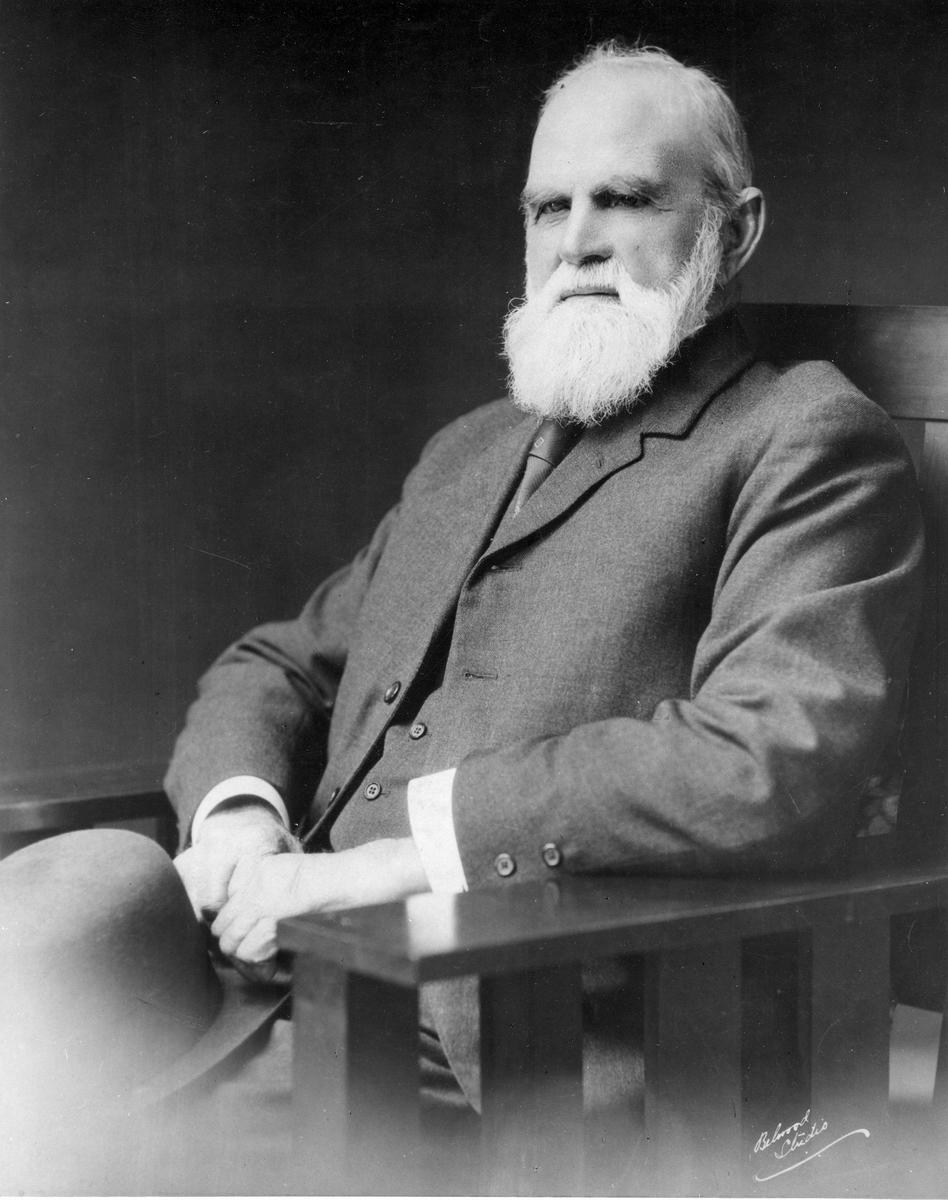
William Winstone in 1922

William had suffered an illness prior to the event, but he was able to attend the Winstone Ltd Diamond Jubilee on 11 March 1924. The event was attended by management, Winstone family members, and employees past and present. William addressed the audience, saying he appreciated "the tributes to his business integrity and the kindness paid him by the staff". As a token of appreciation by his employees, Winstone was gifted the installation of wireless equipment in his home. He said attending the occasion had given him "the greatest pleasure of his life", thanked all the staff for helping make the business a success, and was pleased at the number of old employees in attendance.

William Winstone's health continued to decline following the Jubilee. He died at Tyntesfield on 23 June 1924, aged 81. He was eulogised in Auckland newspapers as a pioneer of business in the city, a man of strong character, and a "great horse lover".

== Legacy ==
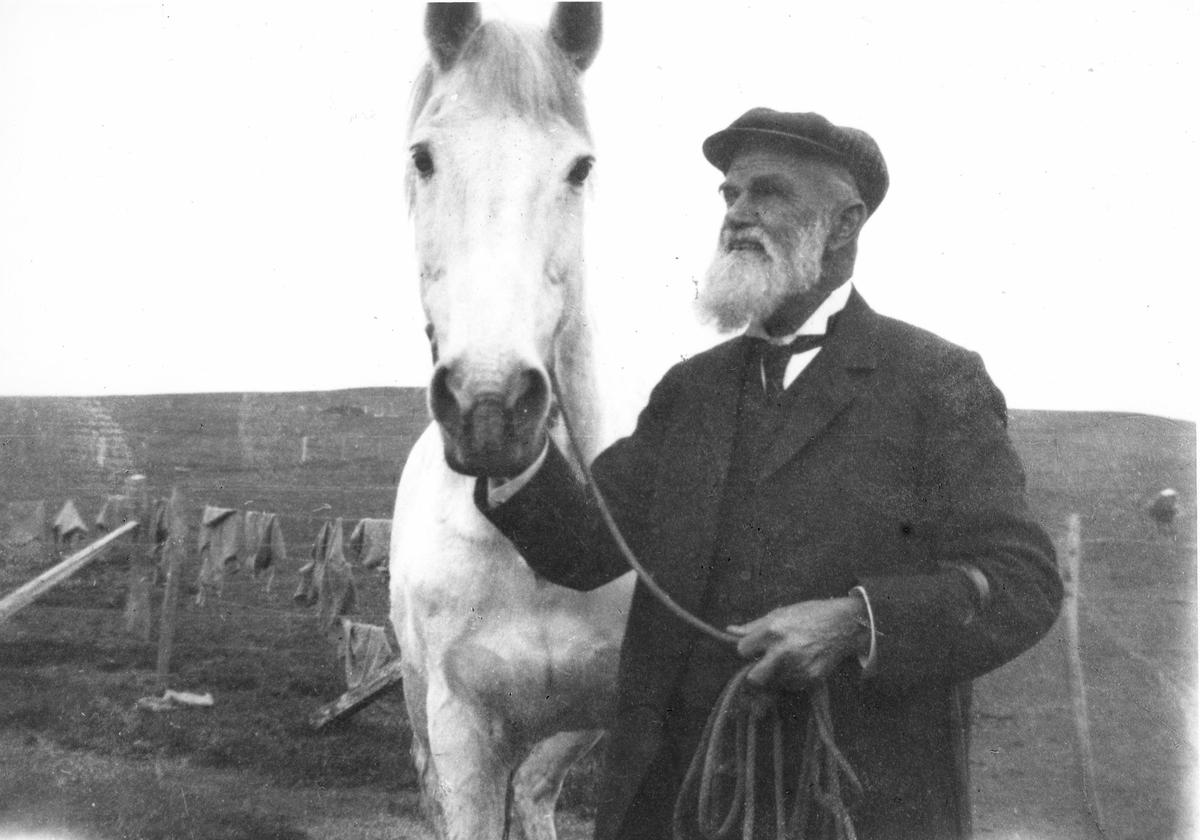
Winstone and his carriage horse 'Tommy', circa 1900

William Winstone witnessed and played a part in the dramatically changing face of Auckland city over his lifetime, as a member of the community, a worker, and a businessman. William and George Winstone were posthumously inducted into the New Zealand Business Hall of Fame in 2015, as the founders of New Zealand's largest aggregate company.

Over William's inception of the business up to his death, the company had grown from one man and his horse and cart, to having 200 horses, 24 motor trucks, a fleet of coastal vessels, engineering, coachbuilding, harness and blacksmith establishments, quarries, scoria, shingle and sand deposits, and a brick and tile works.
