= Marianne Smith =

Marianne Smith MBE (born Mary Anne Caughey; 10 March 1851 – 1 September 1938), and known as Marianne Caughey Preston since 1932, was a notable New Zealand businesswoman, community worker and philanthropist.

Mary Anne Caughey was born in Portaferry, County Down, Ireland, in 1851.

Marianne Smith established Smith & Caughey's in 1880. Her husband joined her when there was sufficient business to support the two of them. In the 1935 King's Birthday Honours, she was appointed a Member of the Order of the British Empire, for philanthropic services.

She died at her home in Auckland on 1 September 1938, and was buried at Purewa Cemetery in the Auckland suburb of Meadowbank.

In 2009, Smith was posthumously inducted into the New Zealand Business Hall of Fame.
