= Craigs Investment Partners =

New Zealand wealth management and investment advisory firm

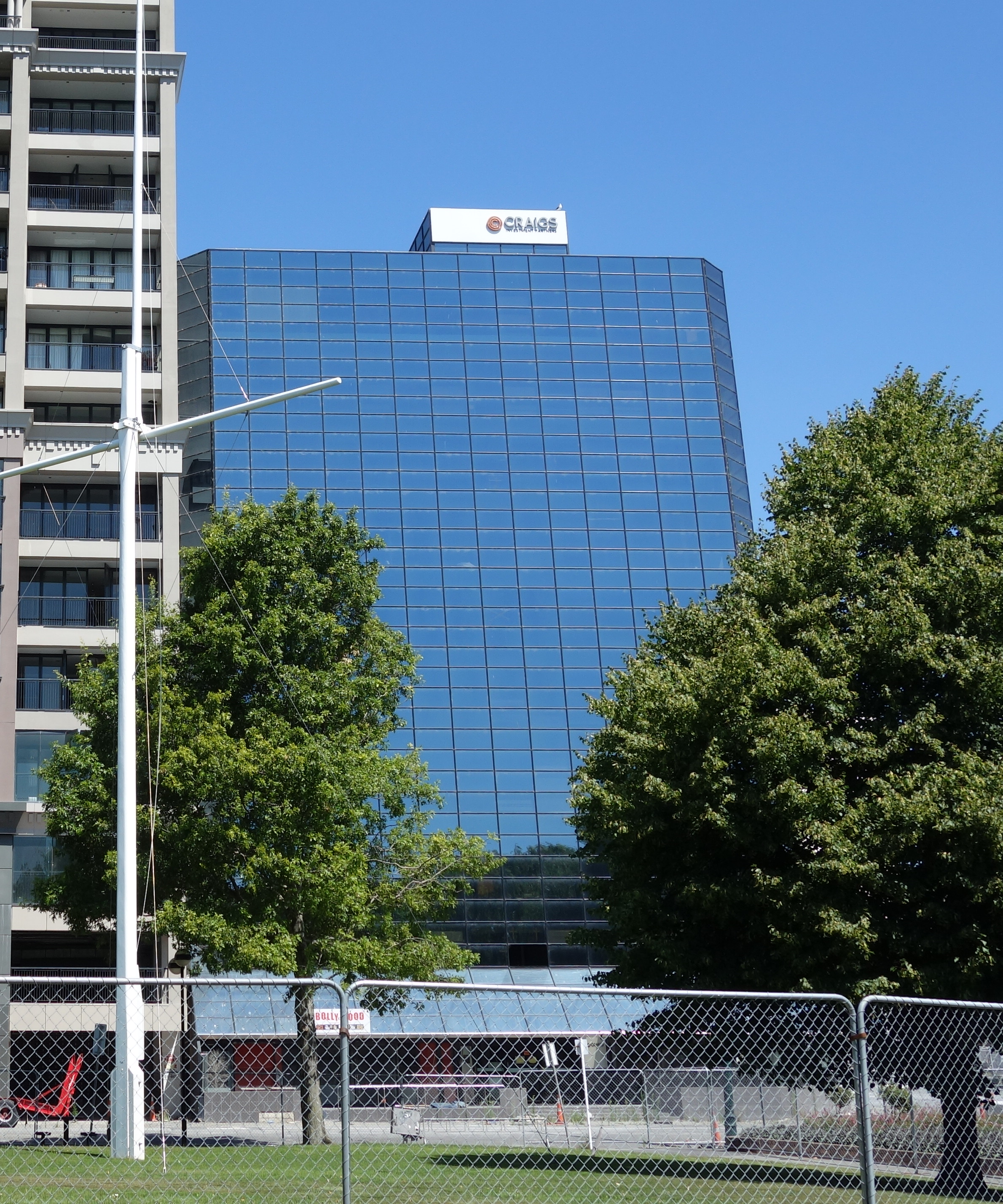
- The earthquake-damaged Craigs Investment Partners House in Christchurch in 2013 prior to its demolition
- Type: Private company
- Industry: Financial services
- Predecessor: Craig & Co
- Founded: 1984; 42 years ago
- Founder: Neil Craig
- Headquarters: Tauranga, New Zealand
- Number of locations: 20
- Area served: New Zealand
- Key people: Neil Craig (Chair); Simon Tong (CEO)
- Services: Private wealth advice, equity broking, and investment banking services
- Owners: TA Associates (50%); employee and director shareholders (50%)
- Number of employees: c. 650 (2022)
- Website: craigsip.com

Craigs Investment Partners (Craigs or CIP) is a New Zealand wealth management and investment advisory firm headquartered in Tauranga. Founded in 1984, the firm provides private wealth advice, equity broking, and investment banking services to retail, wholesale, and institutional clients.

== History ==
=== Founding and early expansion (1984–2001) ===
The firm was established as Craig & Co in Whakatāne in 1984 by Neil Craig. Following the 1987 stock market crash, the firm expanded through the acquisition of regional brokerages in Rotorua, Gisborne, and Tauranga, and moved its head office to Tauranga in 1989. During the 1990s, the firm introduced custodial services and expanded its branch network into the South Island.

=== International partnerships (2001–2020) ===
In 2001, European bank ABN AMRO acquired a 50% stake in the firm, which was rebranded as ABN AMRO Craigs. In 2009, following the exit of ABN AMRO from the New Zealand market, the New Zealand-based partners repurchased the 50% stake and rebranded the firm as Craigs Investment Partners.

In 2010, the firm entered an alliance with Deutsche Bank, which acquired a 49.9% equity interest. This led to the integration of Deutsche Bank’s New Zealand corporate finance division, operating as Deutsche Craigs. In 2020, Craigs repurchased Deutsche Bank's holding, returning the firm to full New Zealand ownership.

=== Recent developments (2020–present) ===
In 2022, Craigs sold the management rights of its subsidiary, QuayStreet Asset Management, to NZX’s Smartshares for approximately NZ$31.25 million. In 2024, the firm announced an alliance with J.P. Morgan Asset Management to provide international investment access for its clients.

In April 2025, private equity firm TA Associates completed the acquisition of a 50% stake in the company via a scheme of arrangement approved by the High Court of New Zealand. Existing staff and directors retained the remaining 50% ownership. In August 2025, Craigs exited its stake in Australian firm Wilsons Advisory following that firm's acquisition by Canaccord Genuity.

== Operations ==
The firm operates 20 branches across New Zealand. Its core business divisions include:

- Investment banking – corporate finance and capital markets advisory services.
- Private wealth management – portfolio management for individuals and trusts.
- Institutional equities – research and trading services for institutional investors.

As of 2025, the firm manages approximately NZ$35 billion in client funds.

== Governance ==
Founder Neil Craig serves as the Executive Chair. Simon Tong was appointed Chief Executive Officer in 2021, succeeding Frank Aldridge, who led the firm for 16 years.
