= Smith & Caughey's =

Department stores in Auckland, New Zealand

Smith & Caughey Ltd
- Type: Private
- Industry: Retail
- Founded: 1880; 146 years ago
- Founder: Marianne Smith
- Defunct: June 15, 2025
- Headquarters: Auckland, New Zealand
- Products: Beauty, Clothing, Homewares
- Website: smithandcaugheys.co.nz

Smith & Caughey Ltd, trading as Smith & Caughey's, was a chain of two mid-sized, upscale department stores in Auckland, New Zealand. Established in 1880 by Marianne Smith, Smith & Caughey was the oldest surviving retail businesses until its closure in June 2025.

The Smith Caughey family is notoriously known for being extremely private.

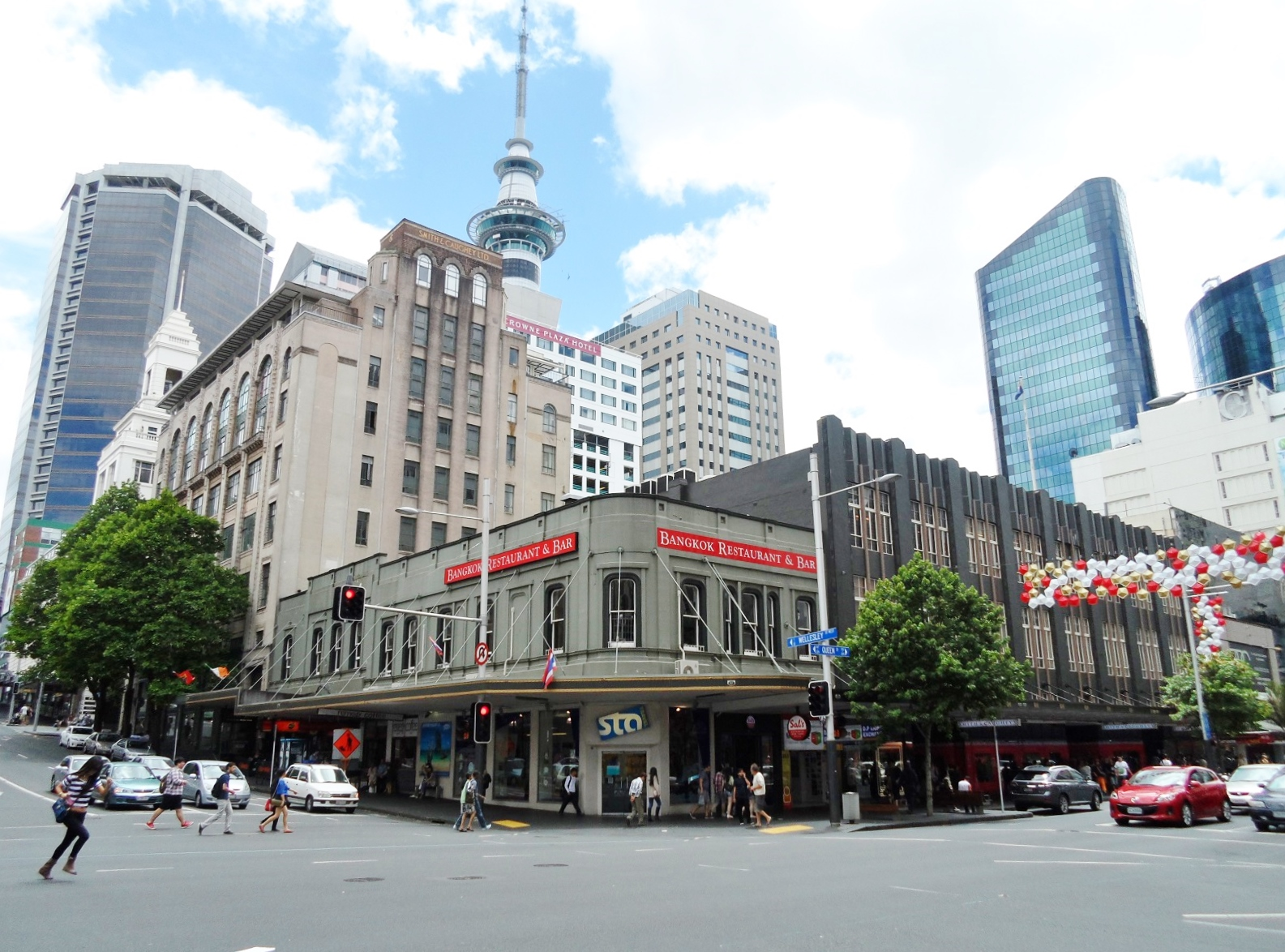
The Queen Street and Wellesley Street West facades of the Queen Street store in the Auckland CBD

Note the corner building does not form part of the 3 building complex. The tower is Smith & Caughey headquarters the Queen Street facade is the main department store building. Elliot St hosts the stock rooms and historic horse stables for home delivery.

== Stores ==
The company had two stores in Auckland; on Queen Street, City Centre, and on Broadway, Newmarket. The flagship Queen Street store occupied a Heritage New Zealand Category 1 Listed building, which was designed by American architect Roy Alstan Lippincott and completed in 1929. The smaller Newmarket store occupied a building which was built by the company in the 1880s; the Newmarket branch initially operated under the name of Hugh Gilmore, before reverting to Smith and Caughey in 1917.

== History ==
One of the oldest surviving retail businesses in New Zealand, it was established in 1880 by Ulster-born Marianne Smith as a drapers and millinery shop, and was the oldest-surviving department store in Auckland until its closure in June 2025.

In May 2024 the company announced that it intended to close both shops and its online store in early 2025 due to the downturn in business which had occurred over several years. A decision was made in August 2024 to continue trading by reducing the Queen St store from two levels to one and closing the Newmarket store.

On 22 May 2025, Smith & Caughey's acting CEO Matt Harray announced that the company would be closing its Queen St store on 31 July, citing declining sales, foot traffic and economic woes. This ended the company's 145 year history. The store closed for the final time on 15 June 2025.

== Gallery ==
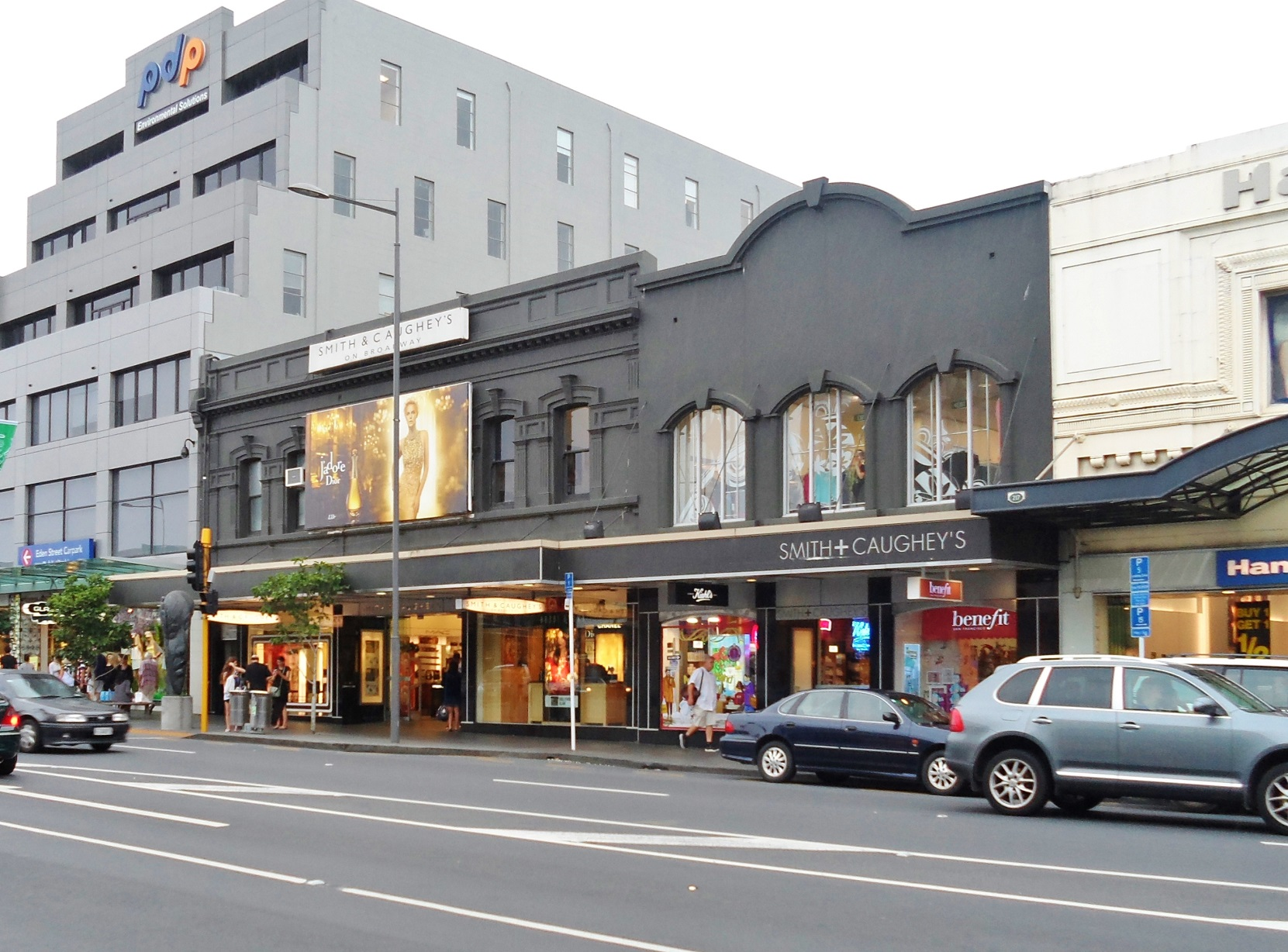
The smaller Smith & Caughey's on Broadway in Newmarket

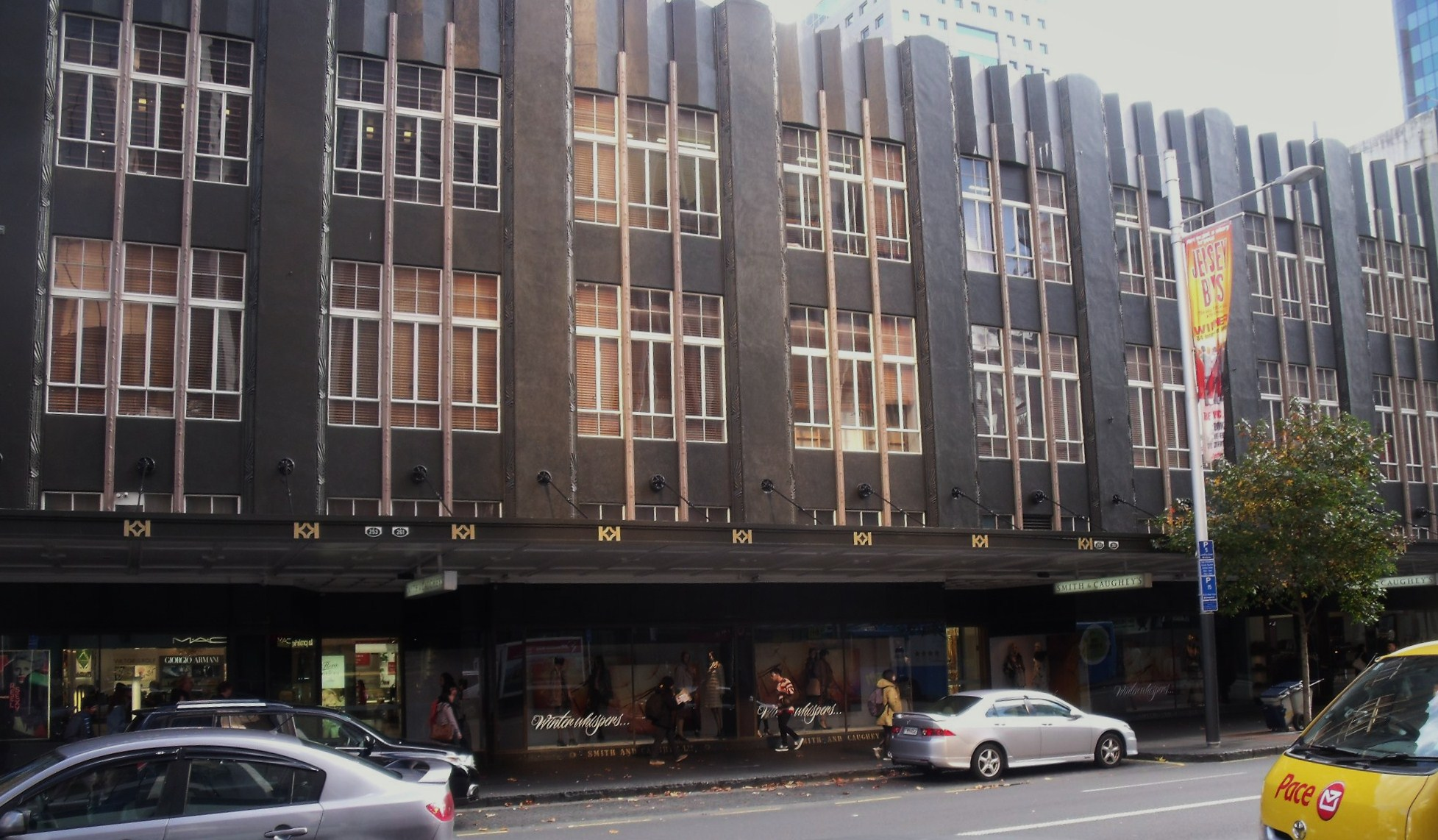
The Queen Street store frontage on Queen Street, Auckland

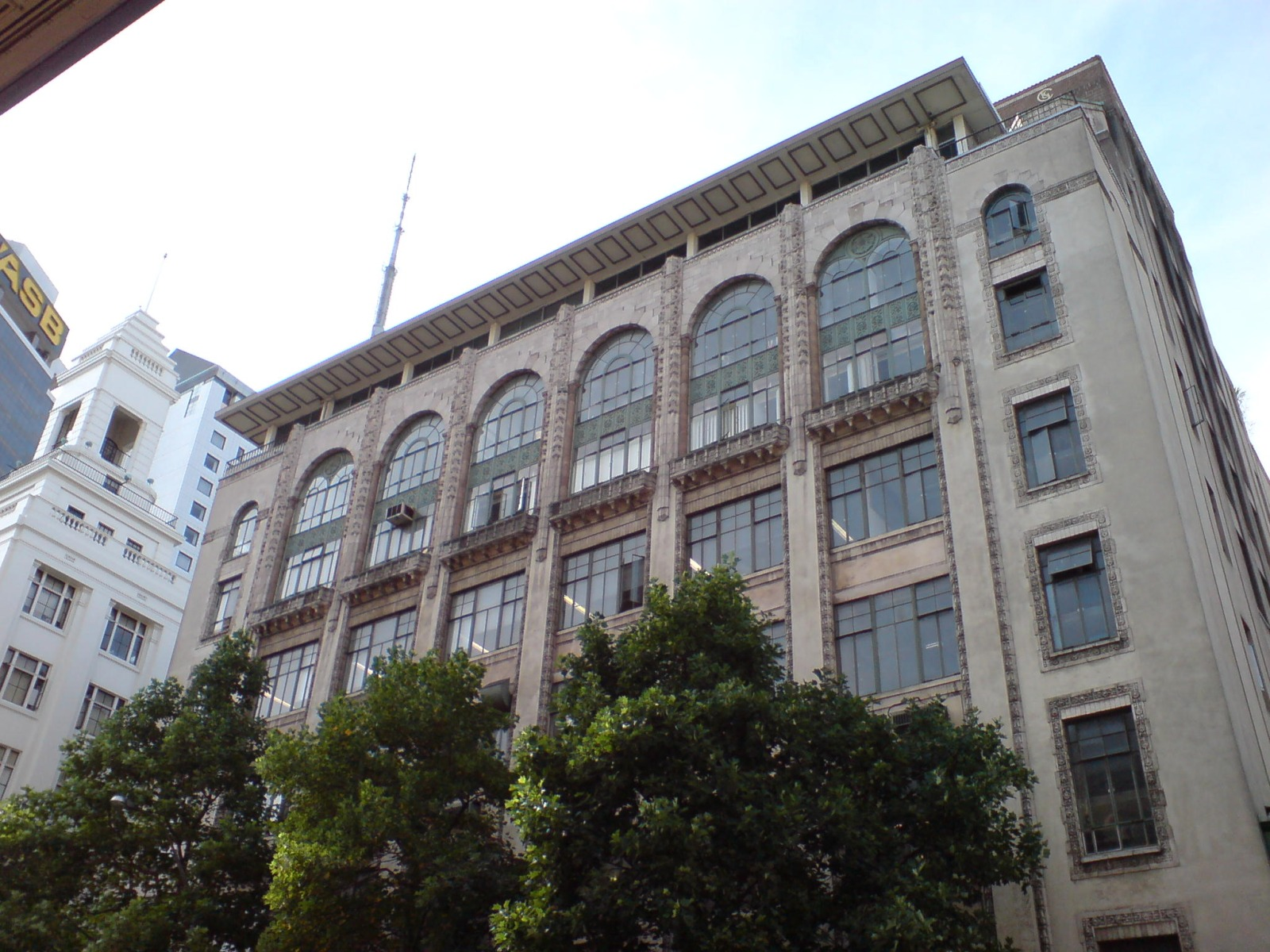
The Queen Street store's Wellesley Street West facade and secondary entrance

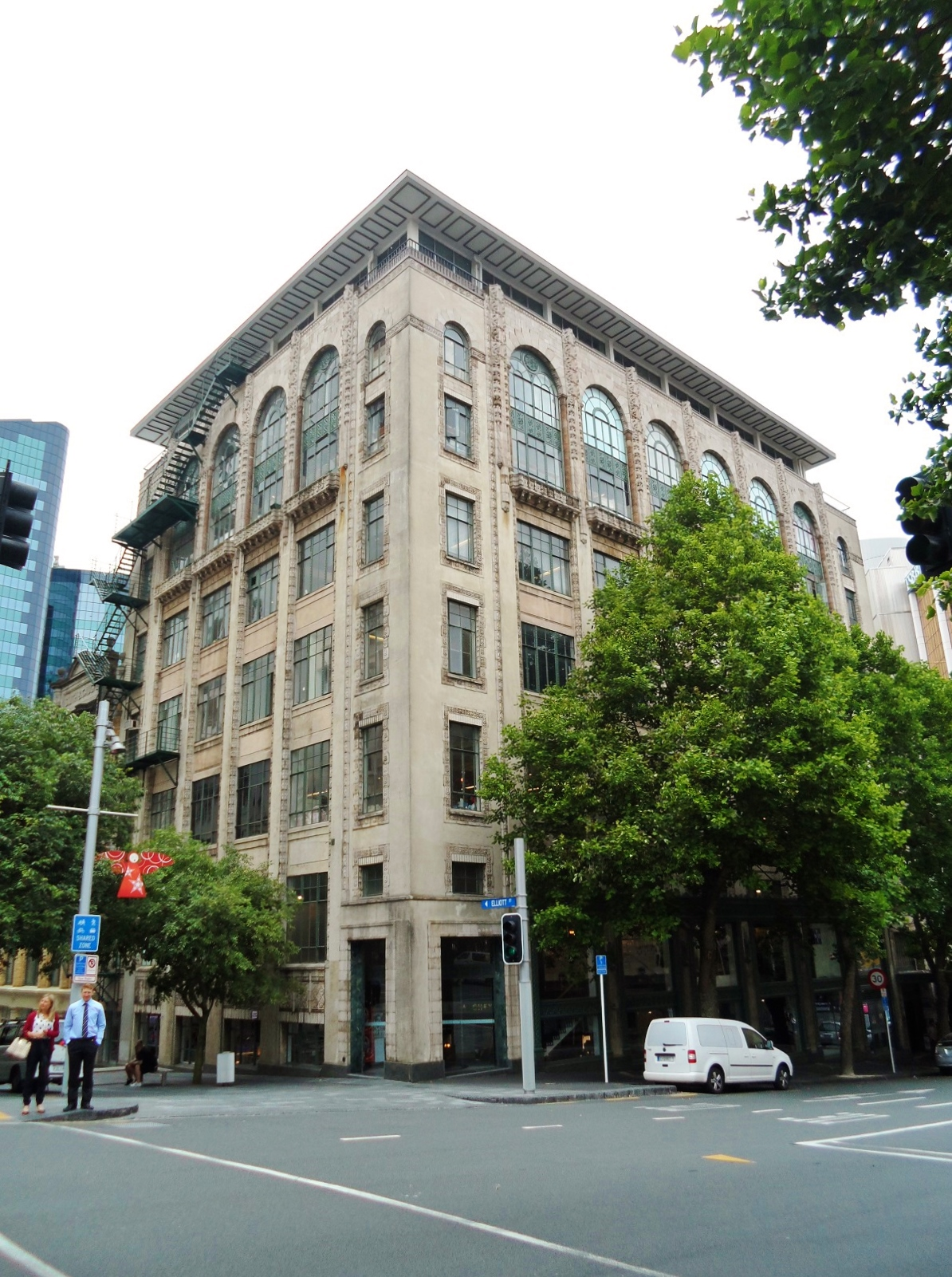
The Smith & Caughey's building, on the corner of Elliott Street and Wellesley Street West

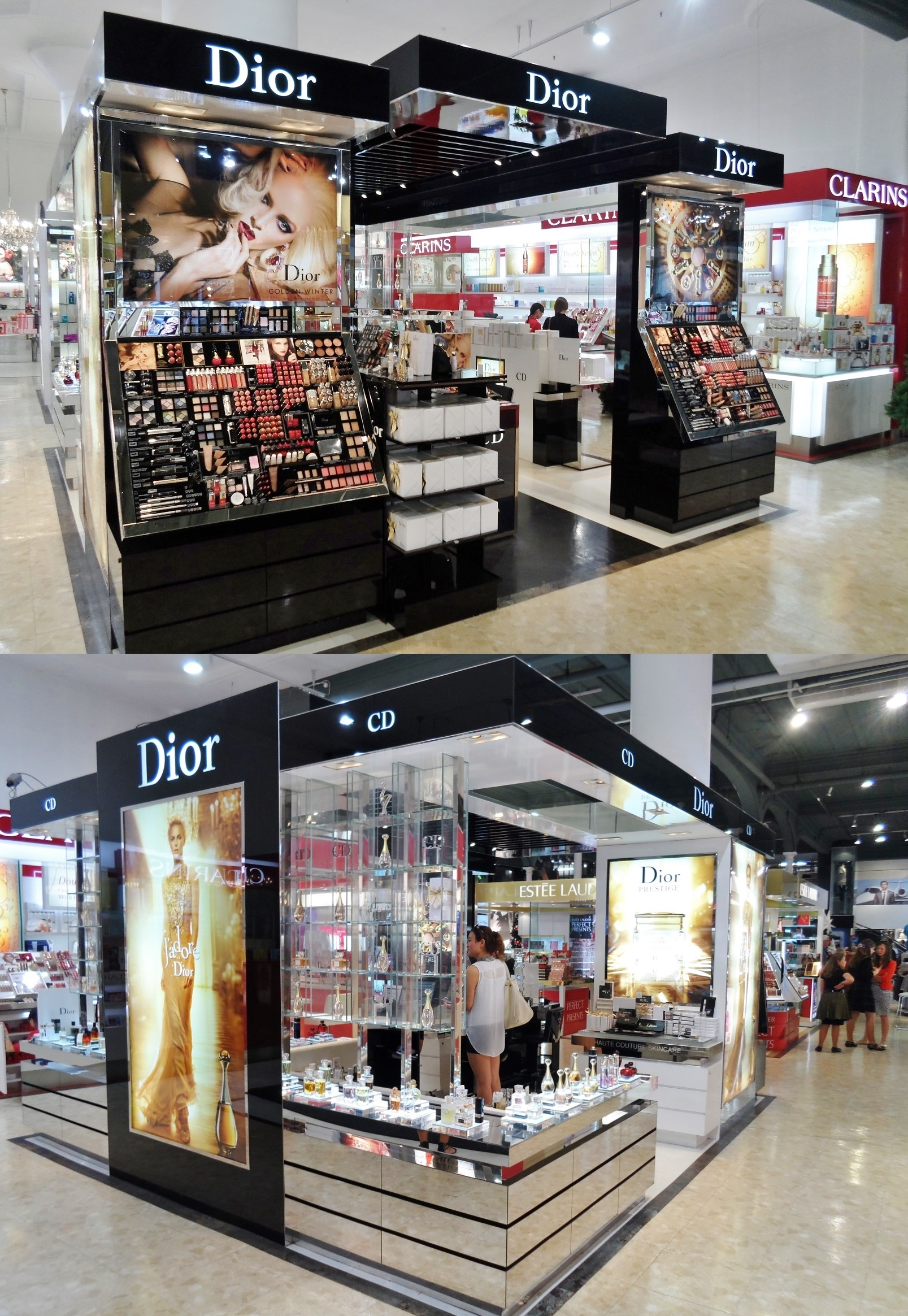
One of the many large-format cosmetics counters at Smith & Caughey's Queen Street, for Dior

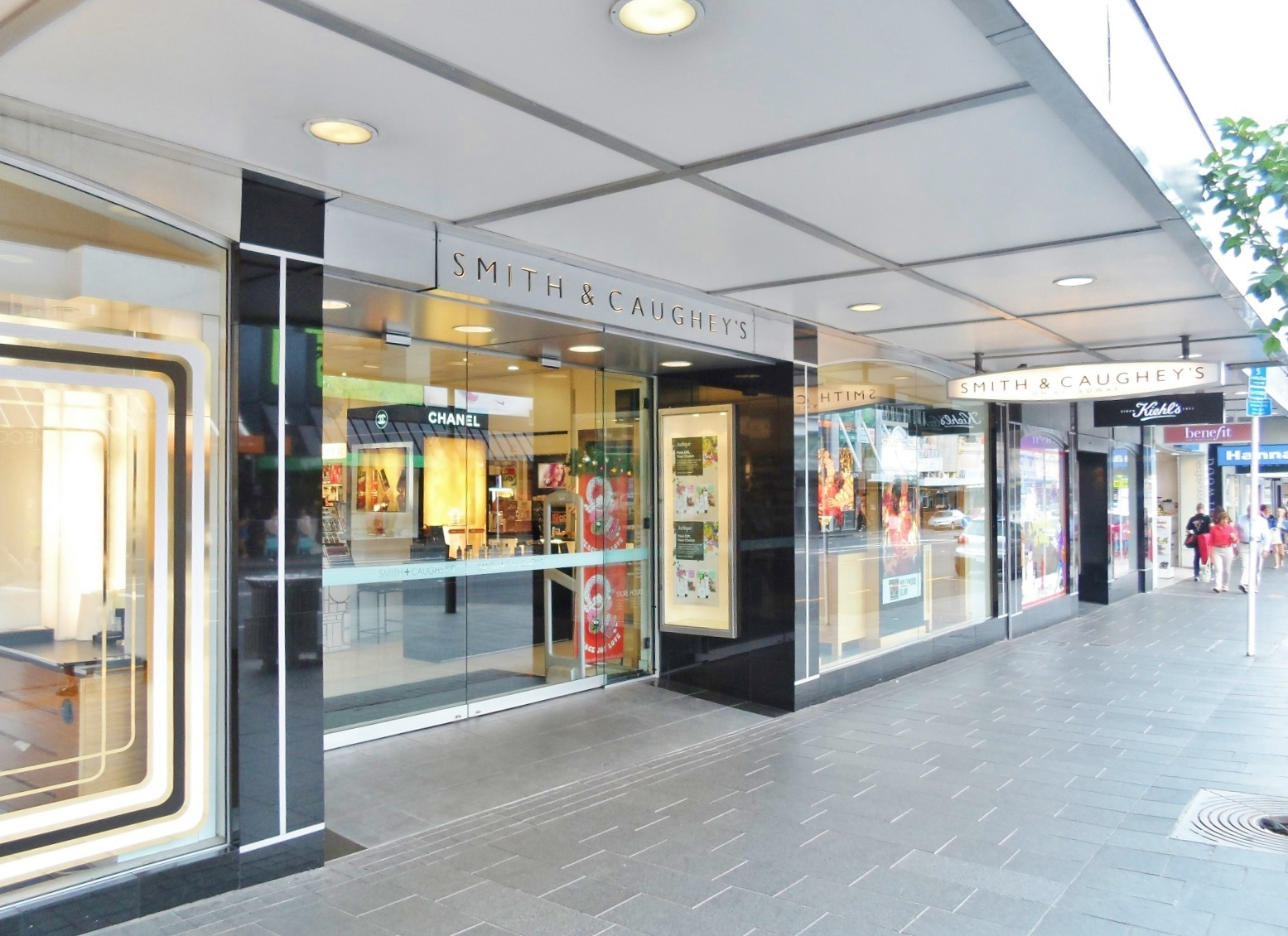
Smith & Caughey's on Broadway entrance, Newmarket, Auckland

== See also ==
- Kirkcaldie & Stains
- Ballantynes
- Arthur Barnett
- H & J Smith
- Farmers
- Milne & Choyce
