= Peter Barr (accountant) =

New Zealand accountant

- Born: 9 July 1861; Dunedin, New Zealand
- Died: 21 March 1951 (aged 89)
- Occupation: Accountant
- Known for: Founding the Institute of Accountants of New Zealand (1894); advocacy for accounting degree recognition in New Zealand

Peter Barr (9 July 1861 – 21 March 1951) was a New Zealand accountant. He was born in Dunedin on 9 July 1861. He was instrumental in founding the Institute of Accountants of New Zealand in Dunedin in 1894 which became the New Zealand Society of Accountants with the passing of the New Zealand Society of Accountants Act 1908. He also agitated to get accountancy degrees status in New Zealand.

In 2003, Barr was posthumously inducted into the New Zealand Business Hall of Fame.
