= Pieter Stewart =

New Zealand businesswoman

Dame Pieter Stewart DNZM
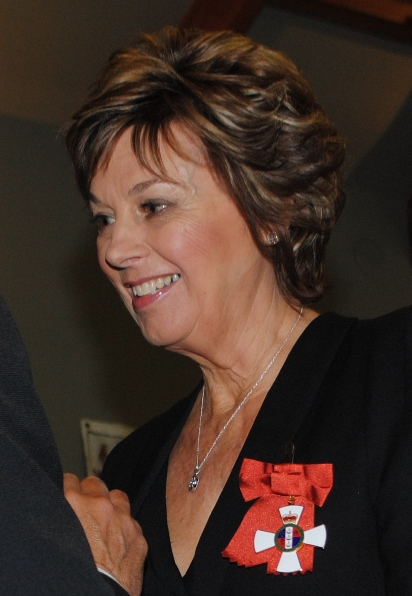
- Stewart in 2012

Dame Pieter Ane Stewart DNZM is a New Zealand businesswoman. In the 1980s, she established her own promotions company and modelling agency, and was the associate editor of New Zealand Fashion Quarterly from 1985 to 1987.

She founded New Zealand Fashion Week in 2000. In the 2012 Queen's Birthday and Diamond Jubilee Honours, she was appointed a Dame Companion of the New Zealand Order of Merit, for services to fashion and the community.
