= Amy Maria Hellaby =

New Zealand businesswoman (1864–1955)

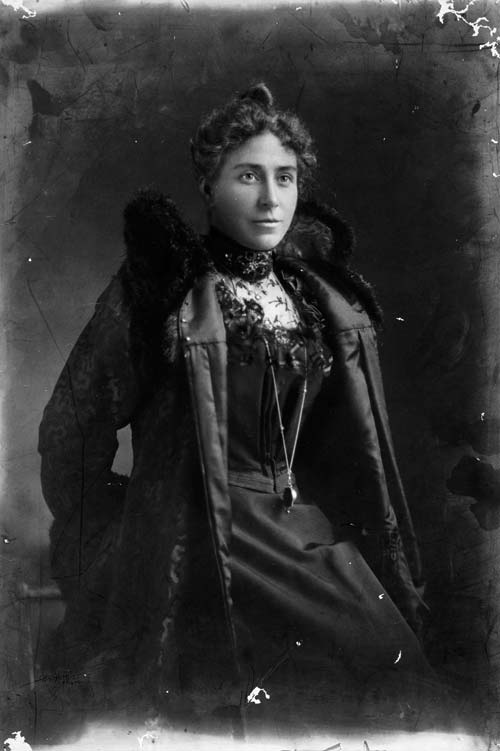
Amy Maria Hellaby, 1890s

Amy Maria Hellaby (3 February 1864 – 7 April 1955) was a New Zealand businesswoman. She was born in Birkenhead, Cheshire, England, on 3 February 1864. When her husband Richard Hellaby died suddenly, she took over the running of the business, which employed 250 people, and was at that time New Zealand's largest private employer. She is buried at Purewa Cemetery.

In 2000, Hellaby was posthumously inducted into the New Zealand Business Hall of Fame.
