= Richard Hellaby =

New Zealand butcher and businessman

Richard Hellaby (5 January 1849 – 20 June 1902) was a New Zealand butcher and businessman. He was born in Thurvaston, Derbyshire, England on 5 January 1849. He died at age 53 and was buried at Purewa Cemetery in the Auckland suburb of Meadowbank. After his death, his wife Amy Hellaby took over the running of the business.
