= List of honorary doctors of the University of Canterbury =

This list of Honorary Doctors of the University of Canterbury shows recipients of an honorary doctorate bestowed by the University of Canterbury since 1962, for those bestowed prior to the dissolution of University of New Zealand see List of Honorary Doctors of the University of New Zealand.

Year	Recipient	Degree
1962	John Llewellyn	LLD
1962	Ngaio Marsh	LittD
1962	John Packer	DSc
1965	Alister McIntosh	LLD
1965	Michael Ramsey	LLD
1966	Bernard Fergusson	LLD
1966	Ted Sorensen	LLD
1962	Kenneth Gresson	LLD
1962	George Jobberns	LLD
1962	George Manning	LLD
1962	Hugh Parton	DSc
1973	Charles Bennett	LLD
1973	Alan Danks	LLD
1973	Alec Leslie Haslam	LLD
1973	Harold Cecil Holland	DSc
1973	Gordon Morrison	DSc
1973	John Greville Agard Pocock	LittD
1973	Karl Popper	LittD
1974	Malcolm Burns	DSc
1975	Allen Curnow	LittD
1975	Vernon Griffiths	MusD
1975	Carlton Hunter Perkins	LLD
1975	John Henry Erle Schroder	LittD
1977	Donald William Bain	LLD
1977	Margaret Dalziel	LittD
1977	Alan Johns	DSc
1977	Alan Low	LLD
1977	Neville Crompton Phillips	LittD
1978	Herbert Meyer Caselberg	LLD
1978	Ian Coop	DSc
1978	Lloyd Evans	LLD
1978	Charles Hilgendorf	LLD
1978	Lance McCaskill	DSc
1981	Frank Richardson Askin	DSc
1987	Jean Herbison	LittD
1987	John Perry Hollings	DEng
1987	Elsie Locke	LittD
1987	Ivor Richardson	LLD
1987	Bill Rowling	LLD
1992	C. E. Beeby	LittD
1992	Tipene O'Regan	LittD
1992	Edward Somers	LLD
1992	Miles Warren	LittD
1993	Margaret Mahy	LittD
1996	Ian Axford	DSc
1996	Harry Evison	LittD
1996	Angus Tait	DEng
1999	Don Brash	LLD
1999	Ian Leggat	LLD
1999	Ernst Badian	LittD
1999	Diana Isaac	DSc
1999	Lindsay Poole	DSc
1999	Warren Roper	DSc
2000	John Ritchie	MusD
2000	Maurice Till	MusD
2000	Eric Godley	DSc
2000	Robertson Stewart	DEng
2000	Gordon Ogilvie	LittD
2001	Ann Ballin	LittD
2001	Bob Park	DEng
2001	Don Beaven	DSc
2001	Robin Clark	DSc
2001	Elric Hooper	LittD
2002	Owen Marshall	LittD
2002	Brian Mason	DSc
2002	Sam Neill	LittD
2002	Gil Simpson	DSc
2002	Andrew Tipping	LLD
2002	Silvia Cartwright	LLD
2003	Bill Pickering	DEng
2003	Peter Munz	LittD
2003	Phyllis Guthardt	LLD
2003	Don Peebles	LittD
2004	Peter McKelvey	DSc
2004	Mike Moore	DCom
2005	Barry Cleavin	LittD
2005	Ian Foster	DSc
2006	Gavin Cormack	DEng
2006	Neil Scott	DSc
2006	Susan Wakefield	DCom
2006	John Wood	LittD
2007	Kerry McDonald	DCom
2007	David Teece	DCom
2008	Jonathan Mane-Wheoki	LittD
2009	Andrew McEwan	DSc
2009	Neville Jordan	DEng
2010	Robin Mann	DSc
2011	Te Aue Davis (Note: Awarded posthumously)	LittD
2011	Ruth Richardson	DCom
2011	Adrienne, Lady Stewart	LittD
2012	Ngau Boon Keat	DEng
2012	Simon Murdoch	LittD
2012	Richard Garland	DSc
2012	John Burrows	LLD
2012	David Caygill	DCom
2012	Neil MacLean	LLD
2012	Graham Henry	DEd
2013	William Young	LLD
2013	Feleti Sevele	LittD
2013	Bill Culbert	DFA
2014	Alan Gibbs	DEng
2014	Antony Gough	DCom
2014	Vincent Ward	DFA
2014	Richard Ballantyne	DCom
2015	Sandra Manderson	LLD
2015	Rosemary Banks	LittD
2015	Rob Fyfe	DCom
2015	Roy Kerr	DSc
2015	John Matthews	DEng
2016	Gavin Bishop	DEd
2017	Peter Holdsworth	DEng
2017	Julie Maxton	LLD
2017	Pip McCrostie	DCom
2017	John Key	DCom
2018	Jenny Harper	LLD
2019	Liz Calder	LittD
2020	Peter Simpson	LittD
2021	John Riley	DCom
2023	Margaret Austin	DSc
2023	Ross Calman	DA
2023	Clarence Nelson	LLD
2023	Mark Stewart	DCom
2025 (Note: No honorary doctorates were awarded in 2024.)	Gaylene Preston	LittD
2025	Graham Panckhurst	LLD
