= Manderson =

Manderson can refer to:

== Places ==
- Manderson, Wyoming
- Manderson, South Dakota

== Other uses ==
- Manderson (surname)
- USS Manderson Victory (AK-230), cargo ship acquired by the U.S. Navy during World War II
