= 1976 New Year Honours (New Zealand) =

Annual awards for New Zealanders

The 1976 New Year Honours in New Zealand were appointments by Elizabeth II on the advice of the New Zealand government to various orders and honours to reward and highlight good works by New Zealanders. The awards celebrated the passing of 1975 and the beginning of 1976, and were announced on 1 January 1976.

The recipients of honours are displayed here as they were styled before their new honour.

== Knight Bachelor ==
- Jack Kent Hunn CMG – of Waikanae. For public services, especially as chairman of the Fire Services Commission.
- The Honourable Stanley Austin Whitehead JP MP – of Nelson. Speaker of the House of Representatives since 1973.
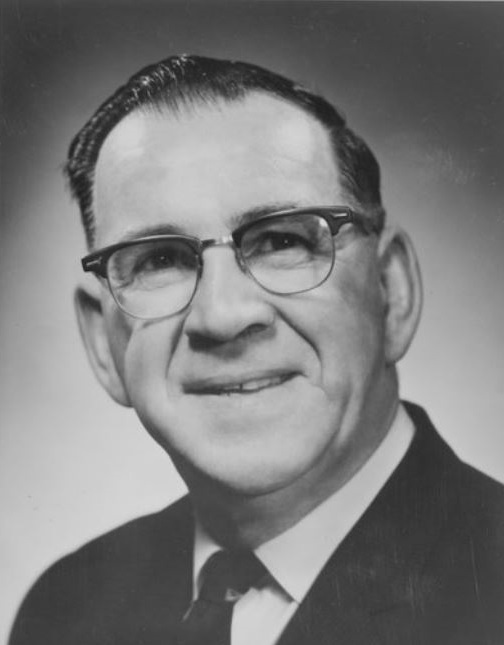
Sir Stanley Whitehead

== Order of Saint Michael and Saint George ==
=== Companion (CMG) ===
- Margaret Rita Nolan – of Porirua. For public and community services.

== Order of the British Empire ==
=== Knight Commander (KBE) ===
Civil division

- Thomas Edward Skinner JP – of Auckland. For services to the trade union movement and the community.
- Henry Rodolph Wigley CBE – of Christchurch. For services to the tourist, travel and aviation industries.
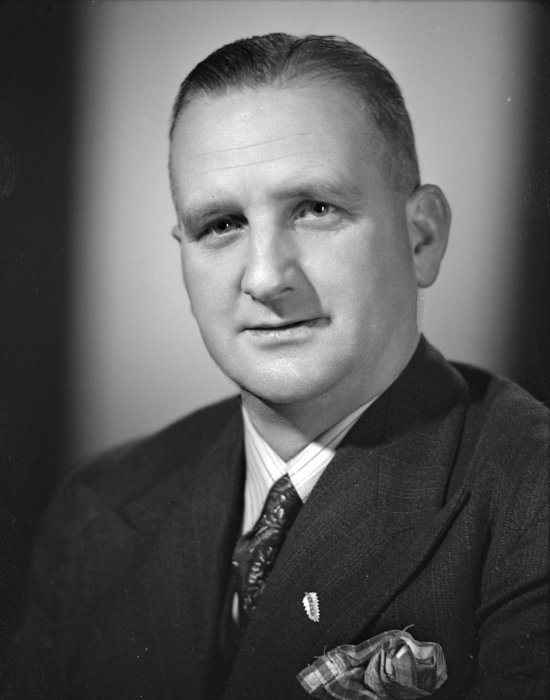
Sir Tom Skinner

=== Commander (CBE) ===
Civil division

- Henry Charles Blazey – of Christchurch. For services to sport.
- Edith Margaret Dalziel – pro-vice chancellor and professor of English, University of Otago. For services to education and literature.
- Ernest George Davey – of Lower Hutt. Secretary of Labour 1970–75.
- Thomas Durrant DSO MBE JP – of Rotorua. For services to conservation, horticulture and education.
- Dr John Joseph Enwright OBE – of Auckland. For humanitarian services.
- Keith Gillies – of Wellington. Controller and Auditor-General 1970–75.
- Ivan Edgar Reddish MBE – of Wellington. For services to the trade union movement.
- David Alexander Stevens – of Paraparaumu. Commissioner of Inland Revenue 1967–75.
- Gilbert Henry Stringer – of Wellington. For services to the arts, television and broadcasting.

=== Officer (OBE) ===
Civil division

- Dr Norman Thomas Barnett – medical officer of health at Auckland since 1967.
- John Benjamin Brazier – of Christchurch. For services to the aviation industry.
- Francis Coll (Brother Stephen) – of Auckland. For services to education.
- James Thomas Currie – of Tokoroa. For services to the community.
- Dr Randal Forbes Elliott – of Wellington. For services to medicine, especially ophthalmology.
- Dr Norman Frank Greenslade – of Christchurch. For services to medicine and the community.
- The Reverend Herepo Ruawhe Harawira – of Whangārei. For services to the Māori people.
- Patrick Anthony Lawlor – of Wellington. For services to literature and the community.
- Muriel Wallace May – of Dunedin. For services to education and literature.
- Douglas William Meldrum JP – of Oamaru. For services to education.
- Howard Leslie Morrison – of Ohinemutu. For services to entertainment.
- Basil Watson Potter MBE – principal, Wellington Polytechnic 1962–1975.
- Rita Frances Snowden – of Auckland. For services to literature.
- John George Walker – of Auckland. For services to athletics, especially as the first person to run the mile in less than 3 minutes 50 seconds.
- The Reverend Ian Bendall Wilson – of Christchurch. For services to hospital chaplaincy.
- Dr Kazimierz Antoni z Granowa Wodzicki – of Wellington. For services to science and public services to the people of Niue and the Tokelau Islands.
- Gideon Tait – lately assistant commissioner, New Zealand Police.

Military division

- Commander Colin George Ashbridge – Royal New Zealand Navy.
- Captain Thomas Andreas Cooper VRD – Royal New Zealand Naval Volunteer Reserve.
- Lieutenant Colonel John O'Bryen Horsford – Royal New Zealand Artillery.
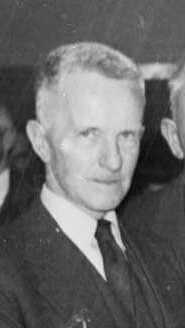
Pat Lawlor

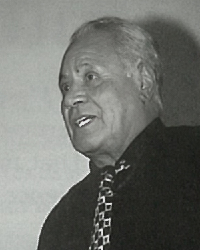
Howard Morrison

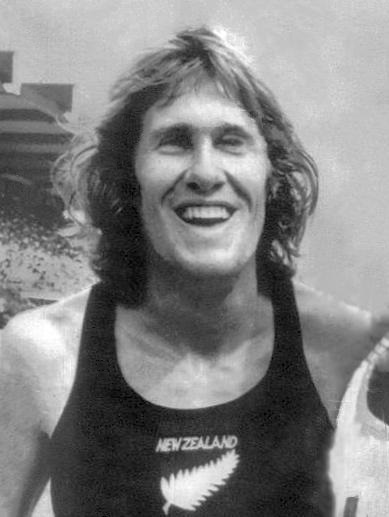
John Walker

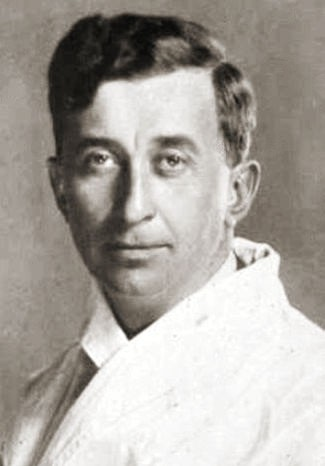
Kazimierz Wodzicki

=== Member (MBE) ===
Civil division

- Richard Dean Batt – professor of biochemistry, Massey University. For services to scientific research.
- Alexander Brunt DSC – of Christchurch. For services to the community.
- Ellen Ada Carroll (Sister Mary Bertrand) – of Dunedin. For services to nursing.
- William John Crighton – of Levin. For services to youth.
- Margaret Dorothy Louise Daniels (Mrs Bezzant) – of Raumati Beach. For services to ballet.
- Ernest Robert Field-Dodgson – of Christchurch. For services to the Royal Christchurch Musical Society.
- Grace Darling Du Faur – of Tauranga. For services to education and the community.
- Leslie Charles Fulford JP – of Christchurch. For services to the printing industry.
- John Crysell Hepburn – of Hamilton. For services to education and the New Zealand Red Cross Society.
- David Peter Joseph – of Auckland. For services to the deaf.
- Lawrence John Krammer – of Motueka. For services to local government.
- Ivan Gerald Mauger – of Christchurch. For services to speedway riding.
- Neta Doris Neale – of Christchurch. For services to the Canterbury Children's Theatre.
- Philip Lloyd Page JP – of Havelock North; general manager, Hawke's Bay Education Board since 1950.
- Francis Edward Graham Poore – of Auckland. For services to music and opera.
- Jeffrey Ellis Robson – of Auckland. For services to tennis and badminton.
- Thomas Godfrey Santon ED JP – of Tāneatua. For local-body and community services.
- Helen Merrilees Thompson – of Middlemarch. For services to the community.
- John Nicolls Thomson ED – of Auckland. For services to speech and drama teaching.
- Elsie Phyllis May Varney – brigadier, Salvation Army, of Wellington. For welfare services.
- Bernard Rolleston Walker – of Christchurch. For services to rowing.
- Albert Thomas Walsh – of Invercargill. For services to the community.
- George Ellis Stanley Kelly – chief superintendent, New Zealand Police.

Military division

- Warrant Officer Writer Leon Graham Mudford – Royal New Zealand Navy.
- Major Francis Noel Griffin ED – Royal New Zealand Infantry Regiment (Territorial Force).
- Temporary Major and Quartermaster Barry Hugh Munro – Royal New Zealand Electrical and Mechanical Engineers.
- Warrant Officer Second Class Lawrence Robert Sincock – Royal New Zealand Artillery (Territorial Force).
- Warrant Officer David Meynard Puckett – Royal New Zealand Air Force.
- Warrant Officer Ronald Taylor – Royal New Zealand Air Force.
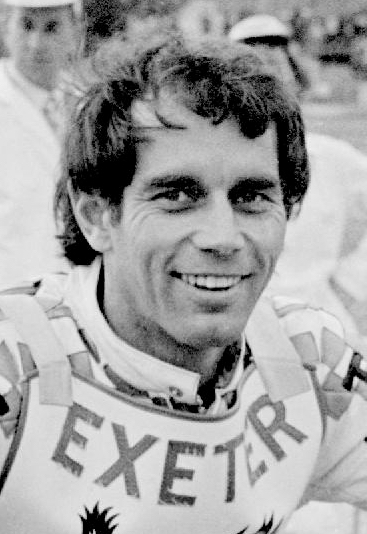
Ivan Mauger

== Companion of the Queen's Service Order (QSO) ==
=== For community service ===
- Douglas Dalton – of Napier.
- Allen Augustine Dingwall – of Christchurch.
- Stanley Roy Key – of Palmerston North.
- Nancy Whanganui Riwaka JP – of Picton.
- Ernest Alfred Soper JP – of New Plymouth.
- Ernestine Hire Taria Tipene JP – of Pōrangahau.
- Max Lewis Younger – of Auckland.

=== For public services ===
- Moreen Dorothy Abercrombie – of Whangārei.
- The Honourable Percy Benjamin Allen – of Whakatāne. Member of Parliament 1957–75, Minister of the Crown 1963–72.
- Walter Sydney Davison JP – of Auckland.
- Norman Vazey Douglas MP – of Auckland. Member of Parliament 1960–75.
- James Eckley Etheredge – of Reefton.
- Greita Earle Clifford-Jones – of Gisborne.
- Ethel Emma McMillan JP – of Dunedin. Member of Parliament 1953–75.
- Eric Alwyn Roussell – of Lower Hutt. Clerk of the House of Representatives 1971–75.
- Allan Priestley Thomson – Director-General of Forests 1971–74.
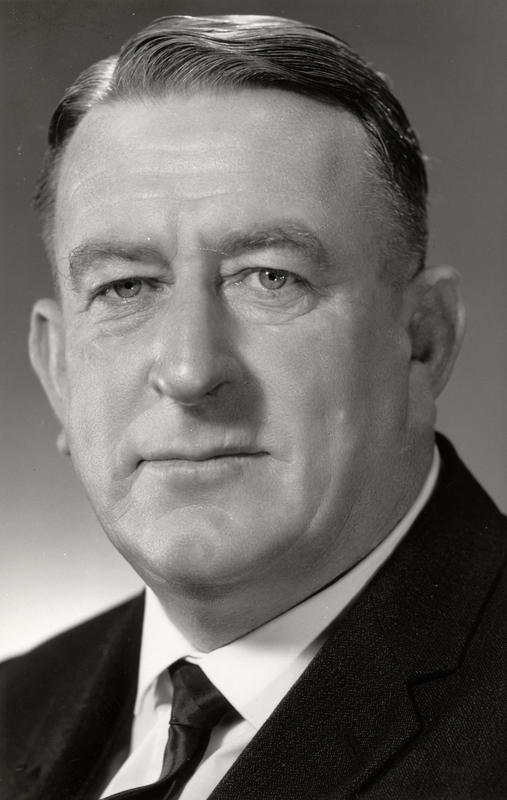
Percy Allen

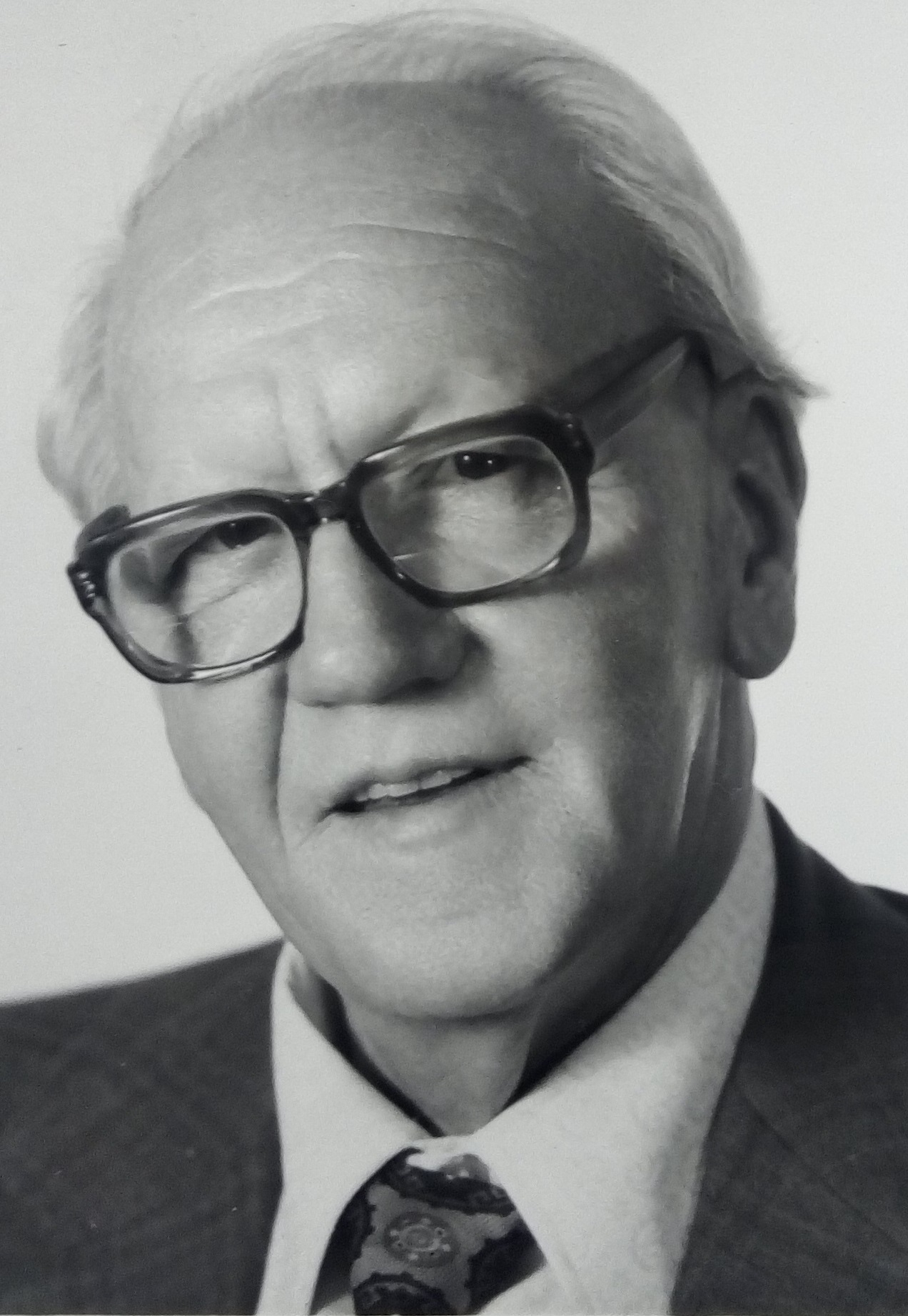
Norman Douglas

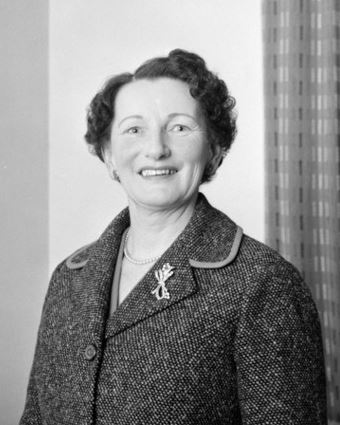
Ethel McMillan

== Queen's Service Medal (QSM) ==
=== For community service ===
- Alberta Aileen Anderson – of Cromwell.
- Nona Fiducia Campbell (Sister Mary Juliana) – of Christchurch.
- Eileen Marion George – of Wellington.
- Alfred William Holdsworth – of Auckland.
- George Alexander Hornsey – of Timaru.
- Joseph William Isbister – of Auckland.
- Doris Joy Ellen Kohn – of Inglewood.
- Hana Romona Murray – of Auckland.
- Peter Travis Norman – of Wellington.
- Runa Avis Parry – of Auckland.
- George Roal Phiskie – of Waipu.
- Reta Rennie – of Wanganui.
- Anne Tia JP – of Auckland.
- Louise Magdalene Te Owaina Wallscott JP – of Dunedin.
- The Venerable Archdeacon Robert John Witty – of Christchurch.
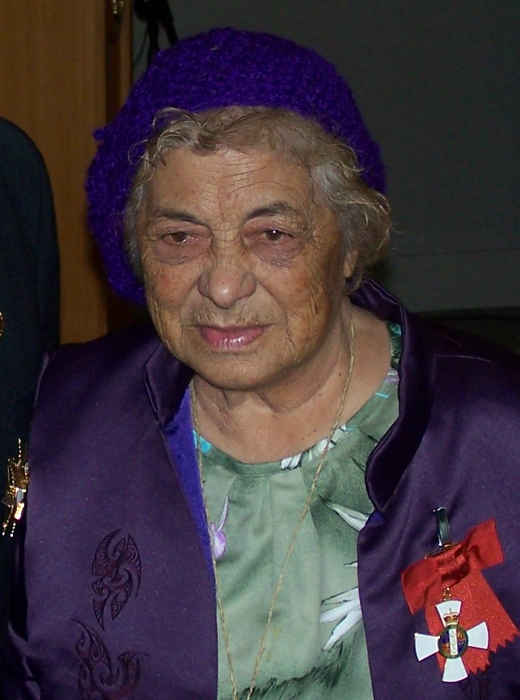
Hana Murray

=== For public services ===
- Stanley John Brown – constable, New Zealand Police.
- Sidney Hamilton Burdett JP – of Ruatoria.
- Sam Chesney – of Lower Hutt.
- Anthony James Clarkson – lately industrial superintendent, Ministry of Works and Development, Tūrangi.
- Florence Ruby Jane Clemett JP – of Kaiapoi.
- Eva Mary Hall – of Napier.
- Lilian Rose Hartley – of Christchurch.
- Isabella Howe – of Lumsden.
- George Joseph Jones – lately civil engineering officer, Ministry of Works and Development, Dunedin.
- Colin William James Lawrie – of Pukekohe.
- Nora Matewai McMillan JP – of Levin.
- Christopher Mountfort – of Manurewa.
- Bertie Lee Stanley – of Auckland.
- Colin Walter Stewart – lately tradesman's assistant, New Zealand Railways, Otahuhu.
- Robert Gill Young JP – of Hamilton.
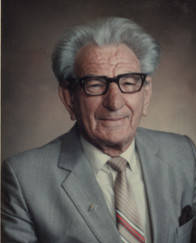
Christopher Mountfort

== British Empire Medal (BEM) ==
Civil division

- Elizabeth Viola Bell – of Matamata. For services to education, sport and cultural activities.
- Jean Elizabeth Boss – of Eastbourne. For services to the community, especially the play centre movement.
- Aileen Linda Gooder – of Auckland. For services to women's hockey.
- Dorothy Gwendolyn Gray – of Plimmerton. For services to the community.
- Charles William Haua – of Tauranga. For services to the community.
- Agnes Jessie Kelly – of Invercargill. For services to social welfare.
- Russell Robert Laidlaw – of Christchurch. For services to the community, especially as secretary-manager of Canterbury Society of Arts.
- Lucy Martinovich – of Northern Wairoa. For services to the community.
- Victor Carlo Smith – of Tauranga. For services to local-body and Māori affairs.
- David Waugh – of Gisborne. For services as a bandmaster.

Military division

- Chief Petty Officer Richard Henry Bishop – Royal New Zealand Navy.
- Staff Sergeant Murray John Booker – Royal New Zealand Infantry Regiment.
- Corporal Keith Bonner Chesterfield – Royal New Zealand Infantry Regiment.
- Sergeant Rangi Tataura Christie – Royal New Zealand Infantry Regiment.
- Warrant Officer Ian James Seabrook – Royal New Zealand Air Force.
- Warrant Officer David Ian Thorpe – Royal New Zealand Air Force.

== Air Force Cross (AFC) ==
- Wing Commander Peter John McKay – Royal New Zealand Air Force.

== Air Force Medal (AFM) ==
- Sergeant Helicopter Crewman Bruce Hector Thornley – Royal New Zealand Air Force.

== Queen's Fire Services Medal (QFSM) ==
- John Edward Dalton – chief fire officer, Te Awamutu Fire Brigade.
- Walter Jacob Manning – chief fire officer, Morrinsville Volunteer Fire Brigade.
- Ivor Charles Wesley – chief fire officer, Dunedin Fire Brigade.
- Charles George Wishart – chief fire officer, Shannon Volunteer Fire Brigade.

== Queen's Police Medal (QPM) ==
- Harvey White – constable, New Zealand Police.

== Queen's Commendation for Valuable Service in the Air ==
- Flight Lieutenant Trevor Keith Butler DFC – Royal New Zealand Air Force.
- Squadron Leader Alan Dyer – Royal New Zealand Air Force.
