= Graham Panckhurst =

New Zealand judge (born 1945)

The Honourable Sir Graham Panckhurst KNZM KC
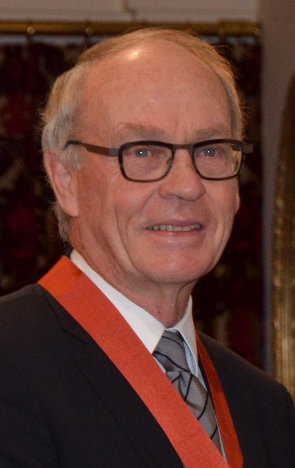
- Panckhurst in 2015

Judge of the High Court of New Zealand
- In office 1996–2014

Personal details
- Born: Graham Ken Panckhurst; 1945 (age 80–81) Reefton, New Zealand
- Spouse: Jill Panckhurst

Sir Graham Ken Panckhurst KNZM KC (born 1945) is a retired New Zealand High Court judge. He chaired the Royal Commission into the Pike River Mine disaster.

== Early life and family ==
Born in Reefton in 1945, Panckhurst was educated at Reefton District High School and Christchurch Boys' High School. He went on to study law at the University of Canterbury, and was elected to the university's Student Representative Council. He married his wife, Jill, a registered nurse, in the late 1960s.

== Legal career ==
Panckhurst was admitted as a barrister and solicitor in Christchurch on 20 February 1970. In 1985, he was appointed as Crown Solicitor for Canterbury and the West Coast. Panckhurst took silk in 1994 and was appointed to the High Court bench in 1996. He retired from the High Court bench in 2014.

=== Notable work ===
In 2009, Panckhurst heard the retrial of David Bain. The trial was substantial with the prosecution calling 150 witnesses. In 2010, Panckhurst was appointed to head the Royal Commission into the Pike River Mine disaster.

== Honours ==
In November 2014, Panckhurst was granted the retention of the title The Honourable, in recognition of his service as a High Court judge. In the 2015 New Year Honours, he was appointed a Knight Companion of the New Zealand Order of Merit, for services to the judiciary. In 2025, he was awarded an honorary Doctor of Law by the University of Canterbury.

== See also ==
- List of honorary doctors of the University of Canterbury
