= Manderson (surname) =

Manderson is a surname. Notable people with the surname include:

- Bert Manderson (1893–1946), Northern Irish footballer
- Charles F. Manderson (1837–1911), United States Senator from Nebraska
- Floyd Manderson (born 1961), British Olympic high jumper, Seoul Olympics 1988
- Sandra Manderson, police officer and police commander from New Zealand
- Tobias Manderson-Galvin (born 1984), Australian actor, satirist, performance poet, dadaist and playwright
- Professor Green, stage name of Stephen Paul Manderson (born 1983), British rapper
