= Cath Vautier =

New Zealand netball player, teacher, and sports administrator

Catherine Wilhelmina Vautier OBE (27 August 1902 – 12 June 1989) was a notable New Zealand netball player, teacher and sports administrator. She was born in Palmerston North, New Zealand, in 1902.

In the 1977 Queen's Silver Jubilee and Birthday Honours, Vautier was appointed an Officer of the Order of the British Empire, for services to sport and the community.
