= Paul Kibblewhite =

New Zealand scientist

Paul Kibblewhite MBE
- Born: Robert Paul Kibblewhite; 20 April 1941
- Died: 20 August 2015 (aged 74); Rotorua, New Zealand
- Education: University of Auckland; Institute of Paper Chemistry
- Known for: Understanding the properties of wood fibres
- Scientific career
- Fields: Pulp and papermaking
- Workplaces: New Zealand Forest Research Institute
- Thesis: Intercellular adhesion in resin canal tissue isolated from slash pine chlorite holocellulose (1969)
- Doctoral advisor: N.S. Thompson

Robert Paul Kibblewhite MBE (20 April 1941 – 20 August 2015) was a New Zealand scientist noted for his research into the properties of wood fibre, particularly in relation to the pulp and paper industry.

== Early life and education ==
Born on 20 April 1941, Kibblewhite was educated at Marlborough College in Blenheim. Joining the New Zealand Forest Service as a trainee in 1960, he was sent to study at the University of Auckland, from where he graduated with a Bachelor of Science in botany in 1965. He then undertook postgraduate study in the United States at the Institute of Paper Chemistry, at that time part of Lawrence University in Appleton, Wisconsin, graduating with an MS in chemical engineering in 1967 and a PhD in 1969. His thesis was entitled Intercellular adhesion in resin canal tissue isolated from slash pine chlorite holocellulose.

== Research career ==
Following his PhD, Kibblewhite returned to the New Zealand Forest Research Institute (now known as Scion) in Rotorua, where he remained for the rest of his working life. In 1983 he became head of the fibre and paper research programme. When he retired from Scion in 2009, Kibblewhite was named as that institution's first emeritus status scientist. During his career he became an international authority on wood fibre, and authored or co-authored 144 refereed publications.

His research was concerned with the properties of wood fibres produced from the mechanical and chemical pulping of both hardwoods and softwoods, and the effects of those properties on the paper manufactured using the fibres. He investigated the many variables in the pulping and papermaking processes, and worked closely with the pulp and paper industry in New Zealand. His research brought about quality improvements for many paper products. With Diane Brookes he also developed what has become known as "Kibblewhite's kink index", which is used to quantify deformations in wood fibres arising during processing.

== Later life ==
Kibblewhite was born extremely short-sighted: his retinas began disintegrating in the late 1960s, and by the late 1990s he needed the assistance of a guide dog. In 2003, while tramping with a group in the Tongariro National Park, his guide dog named Taupo, a white Labrador, was poisoned and required medical evacuation by helicopter. Taupo made a full recovery. In 2007 the pair returned to complete the Tongariro Alpine Crossing.

Kibblewhite died at his home in Rotorua on 20 August 2015.

== Honours ==
Kibblewhite was elected a Fellow of the Royal Society of New Zealand in 1988. In the 1993 Queen's Birthday Honours, he was appointed a Member of the Order of the British Empire, for services to science. He was awarded the Shorland Medal by the New Zealand Association of Scientists in 2000, in recognition of his lifetime contribution to pulp and paper research.
