= Saana Murray =

New Zealand author and weaver (1925–2011)

Saana Murray CNZM QSM
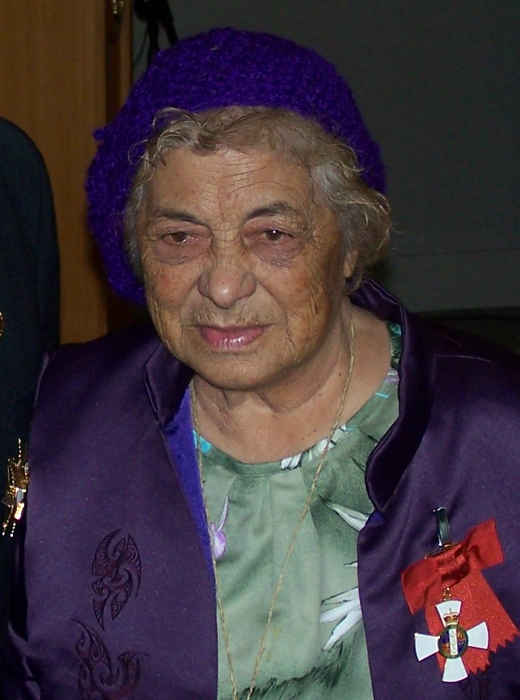
- Murray in 2009
- Born: Saana Romana Murray; 22 November 1925; Te Hāpua, New Zealand
- Died: 3 September 2011 (aged 85)
- Other name: Hana Waitai Murray
- Occupations: weaver, poet
- Known for: weaving and artworks, WAI262 claim
- Awards: New Zealand Suffrage Centennial Medal 1993

Saana Romana Murray CNZM QSM (22 November 1925 – 3 September 2011), also known as Hana Waitai Murray, was a Māori master weaver, poet and writer in New Zealand, who was affiliated with Ngāti Kurī at Aupouri. She was the only claimant on the Wai 262 claim still alive when the report was delivered.

== Early life and family ==
Murray was born on 22 November 1925 at Te Hāpua in Northland, and was the eldest of 14 children. She was affiliated to the iwi Ngāti Kurī. She was educated at Te Hapua and Ngataki Schools, and then studied nursing at Kurahuna Boarding School in Onehunga, and commercial studies at Queen Victoria School. After finishing her studies, she taught Māori Studies at Hillary College during the 1970s. Murray had thirteen children.

When Murray's mother was dying, she asked Murray to promise to "retrieve the land and ratify the Treaty".

== Wai 262 ==
She was the only one of six original claimants on the Waitangi Tribunal claim 262 in respect of matāuranga Māori who was still alive when the report was delivered. The Wai 262 claim by arose out of an International Workshop on the Traditional Uses of Plants in 1988. The claim was lodged by Ngati Kuri, Te Rarawa, Ngati Koata, Ngati Porou, Ngati Wai and Ngati Kahungunu representatives in 1991, seeking tino rangātiratanga of tupuna Māori (ancestral knowledge) for the taonga (Māori cultural treasures) but took more than 20 years to resolve. When the Waitangi Tribunal report was delivered in 2011, Murray spoke of her sadness at realising she was the only claimant still living.

Murray pleaded the case for Māori ownership of Māori taonga, land and intellectual property to anyone who would listen, for forty years, and joked to reporter Kennedy Warne that she would go down in history as "the great objector". She said it was "important to preserve the land for future generations of any race and not succumb to business interests unless they were beneficial to all".

== Creative works ==
In 1998 Murray was appointed as a member of the New Zealand Arts Council. Murray was a tohunga, or master, weaver. In recognition of her status as a master weaver, she was appointed to the Kahui Whiritoi of the New Zealand Māori Arts and Crafts Institute. Murray wrote poetry in te reo and English, and at the time of her death was working on a second book.

Murray's literary work was featured in a film on the 1975 Land March from Te Hāpua. Murray wrote that “It is hard to write in a few words about a thousand years or more of occupation by the Māori of this land Aotearoa. Te ahi kaa, the fires that have been kept burning for centuries at Te Hiku o te Ika a Maui, are still burning today in our remote village of Te Hopua Wai (Te Hapua).”

Murray died on 3 September 2011 and was interred at the urupa in Spirits Bay, near Aupouri.

== Honours and awards ==
Murray was awarded the New Zealand Suffrage Centennial Medal in 1993. In the 1976 New Year Honours, she was awarded the Queen's Service Medal for community service. She was appointed a Companion of the New Zealand Order of Merit, for services to the community, in the 2009 Queen's Birthday Honours.

== Publications ==
- Murray, Saana; Lake, Ruth; Maori Organisation on Human Rights (1974), Te karanga a te kōtuku : some records of the land struggle of Saana Murray and her people of Te Hiku o te Ika, the Far North of New Zealand, Wellington: unknown, OCLC 154152257, Wikidata Q104712750
