= May Edith Evelyn Furey =

New Zealand machinist, political activist and feminist

- Born: 2 May 1891; Islington, London, England
- Died: 29 December 1962 (aged 71); Christchurch, Canterbury, New Zealand
- Organization(s): Women's Social and Political Union; Canterbury Housewives' Union

May Edith Evelyn Furey (2 May 1891 – 29 December 1962) was a New Zealand machinist, political activist and feminist. She was born in London, England.

== Biography ==
Furey was born in Islington, London on 2 May 1891, the daughter of Isabella Rose and her husband James William Edwards, a compositor. Furey was privately educated, and her family lived comfortably. She was widely read, and became interested in politics and debate. Furey was a strong advocate for women's rights and campaigned with Women's Social and Political Union activists Sylvia and Christabel Pankhurst in London. First-wave feminism formed Furey's political activism.

Furey married piano-maker Harry Ernest Finnimore on 1 August 1914, in London. A daughter Betty was born in 1917, but in November 1918 Harry died during the influenza epidemic. Furey travelled to Melbourne to look for work, and while employed at an outback hotel in Echuca, Victoria she met John Patrick Furey, a farmer. They married in 1924, in Inglewood, Victoria, Australia, and lived in a tent until accommodation was available.

In 1939, John was offered work in Christchurch, Canterbury. Upon arrival in New Zealand, Furey was employed as a machinist for Lichfield Shirts. Furey soon joined the New Zealand China Society, NZ-USSR Society, Christchurch Peace Council, and later the Campaign for Nuclear Disarmament.

The Canterbury Housewives' Union (CHU) was founded by moderate Neta Neale in 1942, with support from Furey, in 1944 Furey took over as president. Under her direction the CHU became a Popular Front organisation, linked to other left-wing activists. Furey was the driving force behind the CHU until her death in 1962.

Furey was a delegate to the Christchurch branches of the National Council of Women of New Zealand and the Pan-Pacific and South-East Asia Women's Association.

Furey died on 29 December 1962 at Christchurch, aged 71. She was survived by her daughter and son. Her husband John had died in 1958.
