= Augusta Wallace =

New Zealand judge

Dame Augusta Wallace DBE

Judge of the District Court
- In office 1976–1995

Personal details
- Born: Georgina Catriona Pamela Augusta Dunlop; 11 October 1929
- Died: 12 April 2008 (aged 78) Manukau City, New Zealand
- Spouse: Neville Alan Wallace (m. 1955; died 2003)
- Education: Auckland University College
- Known for: First woman appointed to the judiciary in New Zealand

Dame Georgina Catriona Pamela Augusta Wallace DBE (née Dunlop; 11 October 1929 – 12 April 2008) was the first woman in New Zealand to be appointed as a judge to the District Court in 1976; she served for 18 years.

== Biography ==
Georgina Catriona Pamela Augusta Dunlop was educated in Howick School, Epsom Girls' Grammar School, and Auckland University College where she graduated and was admitted to the bar in 1954. She practiced on her own account as a sole practitioner in Papatoetoe for 11 years.

In September 1975 she became the first woman to become a judge when she was appointed to the District Court bench. She sat at the Auckland District Court for nearly fifteen years, transferred to the Otahuhu District Court for a short time, and finally was based at the Papakura District Court.

Wallace had a long record of community service and extensive judicial experience. In 1990 Wallace was at the centre of a review into courtroom security after she was attacked by a 16-year-old with a machete while serving at the Otahuhu District Court and was seriously injured.

In 1996 Wallace was appointed as a member of the Waitangi Tribunal by then Minister of Maori Affairs, John Luxton.

== Honours ==
In the 1993 Queen's Birthday Honours, Wallace was appointed a Dame Commander of the Order of the British Empire.

== Affiliations ==
Wallace was Patron to a number of community organisations including Age Concern New Zealand, the Hope Foundation, and Victim Support. She was also a trustee of the Child Development Foundation of New Zealand.

== Death ==
She died in Manukau, Auckland on 4 April 2008, aged 78, following a long illness.

== Family ==
She married Neville Alan Wallace, a career army officer, in 1955; he retired from the army in the 1970s, and qualified as a lawyer in 1976. They were survived by a daughter and five grandchildren.
