= Jenny Harper =

New Zealand academic and museum professional

Jenny Harper MNZM
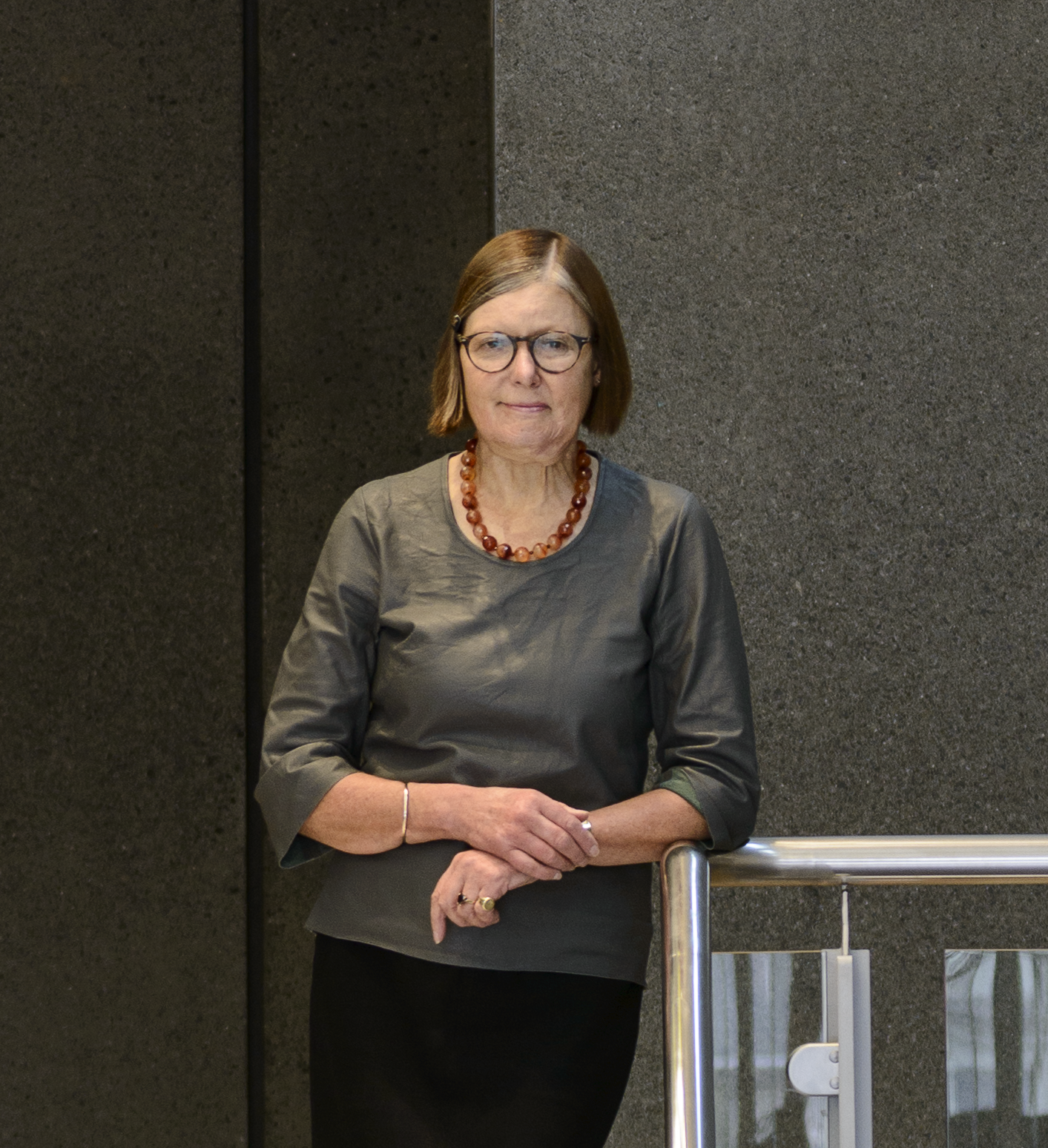
- Harper in 2016
- Born: 27 April 1950 (age 76); Geraldine, New Zealand
- Education: University of Canterbury; Courtauld Institute, University of London; University of Sydney
- Known for: Victoria University of Wellington (Head of Art History, 1995–2001; Assistant Vice Chancellor, 2001–2006); Christchurch Art Gallery (director, 2006–2018)
- Awards: LLD (2018)

Jenny Gwynndd Harper MNZM (born 27 April 1950) is a New Zealand academic and museum professional. She was most recently the director of Christchurch Art Gallery.

== Early life and education ==
Born in Geraldine on 27 April 1950, Harper was educated at Villa Maria College, Christchurch. She completed a Bachelor of Arts at the University of Canterbury in 1972, a Diploma of Secondary Teaching at Christchurch Teachers' College in 1976, and a Master of Arts in religious studies at the University of Canterbury in 1977. Her master's thesis was titled The Relationship between Iconography and Mythology with Reference to the Hindu God, Siva. In 1982, she completed a Master of Philosophy (in art history) at the Courtauld Institute, University of London, and in 1983 a Diploma in Museum Studies at the University of Sydney.

She married Frank Lewis Bailey, and the couple had one child.

== Career ==
Harper began her career in art museums in 1983 as assistant curator in the International Prints and Illustrated Books department of the National Gallery of Australia. From 1983 to 1986 she was curator of European Art at the Queensland Art Gallery.

In 1986, Harper returned to New Zealand and became Senior Curator of international art at the National Art Gallery in Wellington (prior to the merger of the National Art Gallery and National Museum to form the Museum of New Zealand Te Papa Tongarewa). During this time Harper curated exhibitions of the work of Barbara Kruger (1988), Cindy Sherman (1989) and Imants Tillers (1989). In 1988 and 1989, Harper was part of the Institutional Planning Team for the Museum of New Zealand Te Papa Tongarewa, and from 1990 the director of the National Art Gallery, Wellington, until legislative change took effect in 1992 at which point she became the Director, Art and History, Museum of New Zealand Te Papa Tongarewa. During 1994, Harper was Director, Museum Projects at Te Papa.

In 1995, Harper left Te Papa to take up a position as Head of Art History at Victoria University of Wellington; between 2001 and 2004 she was Head, School of Art History, Classics and Religious Studies at the university and in 2004 was appointed Assistant Vice-Chancellor (Academic). During her time at Victoria University, Harper was a driving force behind the establishment of the Adam Art Gallery, a project which involved the controversial sale of a major work by Colin McCahon, which the artist had gifted to the university, to fund a budget shortfall and provide an endowment for future collection acquisitions.

In July 2006, Harper was announced as the new director of Christchurch Art Gallery, replacing outgoing director Tony Preston. She led the gallery through the five-year closure following the 2011 Christchurch earthquakes, with the gallery not re-opening until December 2015. During the closure Harper led the crowdfunding drive to raise funds for the acquisition of Chapmn's Homer a sculpture by Michael Parekowhai, part of the artist's installation at the 2011 Venice Biennale. Raising $206,050, the 'Back the Bull' campaign was at the time the most successful crowdfunding campaign in New Zealand.

Harper gave notice of her resignation as director in 2017, taking effect at Easter 2018. Her tenure is noted for her fundraising efforts, in addition to increasing visitor numbers and expanding the gallery's permanent collection to have a stronger national and international remit.

== Venice Biennale ==
Harper was the Commissioner for New Zealand's representations at the 2009, 2011 and 2013 Venice Biennales (featuring Judy Millar and Francis Upritchard, Michael Parekowhai, and Bill Culbert respectively).

== Honours and awards ==
In 1990, Harper was awarded the New Zealand 1990 Commemoration Medal. In the 2011 Queen's Birthday Honours, she was appointed a Member of the New Zealand Order of Merit, for services to the arts. In 2018, Harper was awarded an honorary doctorate by her alma mater, the University of Canterbury.

== Further information ==
=== Newspaper and magazine interviews ===
- Sally Blundell, 'The new broom', New Zealand Listener, 14 October 2006. (Discusses her plans for promotion of the gallery and her earlier career. Mentions her involvement with Victoria University of Wellington art history department, Adam Art Gallery and National Art Gallery in Wellington.)
- Martin Van Beynen, 'Ambitious for art', The Press, 29 July 2006, p.D3. (Profiles the new director of the Christchurch Art Gallery. Presents her curriculum vitae and talks to her about her character and personal and career experiences.)
- Josie McNaught, 'The three graces', The Dominion, 4 September 1999, p. 17 (Refers to the high-profile arts leaders – Dame Cheryll Sotheran, chief executive of Te Papa; Paula Savage, director of City Gallery; and Jenny Harper, head of art history at Victoria University.)
- Ngaire Hopper, 'Jenny Harper : guardian of art treasures', The Evening Post, 25 May 1991, p. 25. (Backgrounds the career and philosophy of the current Director of the National Art Gallery. Mentions the proposed organisation of the Museum of NZ.)
- Gill Newland, 'Art for the people', More, January 1991, p. 14. (Outlines the professional philosophy of the new director of the National Art Gallery.)
- Rosemary McLeod, 'A spat in the art world: power games at the National Gallery', North and South, August 1988, pp. 102–111. (Discusses recent problems at the National Art Gallery.)

=== Radio interviews ===
- "Jenny Harper interviewed on reopening of Christchurch Art Gallery". Standing Room Only. RNZ National. 13 December 2015.
- "Jenny Harper interviewed on New Zealand's 2013 presentation at the Venice Biennale". Radio New Zealand. 28 January 2013.
- "Jenny Harper interviewed on Michael Parekowhai's exhibition in Christchurch". Radio New Zealand. 5 July 2012.
- "Jenny Harper interviewed on Christchurch Art Gallery funding". Radio New Zealand. 6 December 2009.
