= Dawn Lamb =

Dame Dawn Lamb DBE JP

Principal of Christchurch Girls' High School
- In office 1987–1998
- Preceded by: Joan Prisk
- Succeeded by: Prue Taylor

Personal details
- Born: Dawn Ruth Ritchie; 17 May 1940 (age 85); Auckland, New Zealand
- Occupation: Teacher, school principal

Dame Dawn Ruth Lamb DBE JP (formerly Taylor, née Ritchie; born 17 May 1940) is a former New Zealand schoolteacher. She was principal of Christchurch Girls' High School between 1987 and 1998.

== Early life and family ==
Lamb was born Dawn Ruth Ritchie, the daughter of Ruth Adelaide Ritchie (née Leadbeater) and Leslie William Ritchie, in the Auckland suburb of Kohimarama on 17 May 1940. Her first marriage was to Denis Taylor, and the couple spent time in Ghana, where Lamb worked as a personal assistant to Thomas Lionel Hodgkin at the Institute of African Studies, University of Ghana. After moving back to New Zealand in the late 1960s, the couple divorced, and she married Douglas Lamb.

== Education career ==
After returning from Ghana, Lamb worked at Auckland's Dilworth School, and later as a dean at Rangitoto College. She was involved in the establishment of Macleans College in the Auckland suburb of Howick, where she was the inaugural senior mistress from 1980 until 1986. While teaching in Auckland, Lamb studied part-time and completed a Bachelor of Laws degree.

In 1987, Lamb was appointed principal of Christchurch Girls' High School, and she remained there until retiring to Wellington in December 1998. She soon became involved with He Huarahi Tamariki in Porirua, New Zealand's first school for teenage parents, where she worked part-time to establish an early childhood centre, which she went on to manage.

From 1990, Lamb was an executive member of the Secondary Principals' Association, the Teacher Registration Board, and the secondary joint action group of the New Zealand Qualifications Authority.

== Other activities ==
Lamb is a justice of the peace, and in 2005 she was appointed as a visiting justice, with the authority to hear charges and appeals relating to offences against prison discipline, the treatment and conduct of prison inmates, and to inquire into alleged abuses in prisons.

== Honours ==
In the 1993 Queen's Birthday Honours, Lamb was appointed a Dame Commander of the Order of the British Empire, for services to education.
