= Neta Neale =

Neta Doris Neale MBE (née Billcliff; 17 March 1904 – 26 May 1988) was a New Zealand theatre director and speech and drama teacher.

In 1942, Neale formed the Canterbury Housewives' Union with support from feminist activist May Furey.

In the 1976 New Year Honours, Neale was appointed a Member of the Order of the British Empire, for services to the Canterbury Children's Theatre.
