= Randal Elliott =

New Zealand eye surgeon and campaigner for safety glass

Sir Randal Elliott KBE GCStJ FRCS
- Born: Randal Forbes Elliott; 12 October 1922; Wellington, New Zealand
- Died: 20 July 2010 (aged 87)
- Occupation: Ophthalmologist
- Relatives: James Elliott (father)

Sir Randal Forbes Elliott KBE GCStJ FRCS (12 October 1922 – 20 July 2010) was a New Zealand eye surgeon and a campaigner for safety glass.

== Early life and education ==
Elliott was born in Wellington into a family with a long medical history. His father, Sir James Elliott, was a doctor and medical journalist, editing the New Zealand Medical Journal for many years, and both of his brothers trained as doctors.

He was educated at Wanganui Collegiate School and later studied at Victoria University College and University of Otago Dunedin School of Medicine where he graduated with a MB ChB in 1947.

In 1949, Elliott married Pauline June Young, and the couple went on to have seven children.

== Work ==
After medical school, Elliott trained at the Royal College of Surgeons of England, and moved to the Institute of Ophthalmology in London for instruction in eye surgery.

Elliot served as chairman in 1971–1972, and President in 1977, of the New Zealand Medical Association.

He played a part in making laminated windscreens compulsory in cars and banning plate-glass or mesh-glass in public areas because of the danger to people walking into them.

== Military service ==
During World War II he served with the 1st Battalion, Wellington Regiment, and the Otago University Medical Corps. He was later a medical officer with the Royal New Zealand Air Force achieving the rank of Group Captain and serving in Sarawak, Sabah and Vietnam.

== Order of St John ==
Elliott served the Order of St John for many years and was Chancellor of St John in New Zealand from 1980 to 1986. His father was also Chancellor of St John.

He also performed several tours of duty to the St John Eye Hospital in Jerusalem as Ophthalmic Surgeon.

== Honours ==
Elliott was appointed an Officer of the Order of the British Empire in the 1976 New Year Honours, for services to medicine, especially ophthalmology. In the 1977 Queen's Silver Jubilee and Birthday Honours, he was promoted to Knight Commander of the Order of the British Empire, for services to medicine.

In 1978, Elliott was appointed a Knight of the Order of St John. He was promoted to Bailiff Grand Cross of the Order of St John in 1987 in recognition of his significant contribution to the order of St John. His father was also promoted to Bailiff Grand Cross. Bailiff Grand Cross is the highest award in the St John Honours system. This honour is limited to only ten people, outside the royal family, worldwide.
