= Dorothy Daniels =

Ballet teacher and director (1916 - 1981)

Margaret Dorothy Louise Daniels MBE (1 August 1916 – 27 June 1981) was a New Zealand ballet teacher and director.

== Early years ==
She was born in Wellington, New Zealand, on 1 August 1916, the third of four children of Winifred Louise Smart and her husband, Frederick William Daniels, a civil servant. She was educated at Kelburn Normal School and Wellington Girls' College. At the age of 15, she opened her first studio at King's Chambers, at the corner of Willeston and Willis Streets.

== Marriage ==
On 21 December 1938, aged 22, she wed Desmond Hulbert Bezzant; the couple had one child.

== Later years ==
In 1965, she took up a Teacher's Award from the Queen Elizabeth II Arts Council of New Zealand to observe ballet teaching methods in the United Kingdom and Europe, including Russia, where she studied the Bolshoi Ballet. In the 1976 New Year Honours, she was appointed a Member of the Order of the British Empire, for services to ballet.
