= 1977 Birthday Honours (New Zealand) =

Awards list for New Zealand

1977 Queen's Silver Jubilee and Birthday Honours
- Previous: 1977 Royal Visit Honours; Next: 1977 bravery awards
- Type: New Zealand royal honours: Honorary military appointments; Order of the Companions of Honour; Knight Bachelor; Order of the Bath; Order of St Michael and St George; Order of the British Empire; Queen's Service Order; Queen's Service Medal; Queen's Fire Service Medal; Queen's Police Medal; Air Force Cross; Air Force Medal
- Date: 11 June 1977
- Country: New Zealand
- Total recipients: 155

The 1977 Queen's Silver Jubilee and Birthday Honours in New Zealand, celebrating the official birthday of Elizabeth II and the 25th anniversary of her accession to the throne, were appointments made by the Queen on the advice of the New Zealand government to various orders and honours to reward and highlight good works by New Zealanders. They were announced on 11 June 1977.

The recipients of honours are listed here as they were styled before their new honour.

== Honorary military appointments ==
- Her Majesty The Queen – to be colonel-in-chief, Royal New Zealand Army Ordnance Corps.
- Her Majesty Queen Elizabeth The Queen Mother – to be colonel-in-chief, Royal New Zealand Army Medical Corps.
- His Royal Highness The Prince Philip, Duke of Edinburgh – to be field marshal, New Zealand Army, and Marshal of the Royal New Zealand Air Force.
- His Royal Highness The Prince of Wales – to be air commodore-in-chief, Royal New Zealand Air Force.
- Her Royal Highness The Princess Anne, Mrs Mark Phillips – to be colonel-in-chief, Royal New Zealand Corps of Signals and Royal New Zealand Nursing Corps.
- Her Royal Highness Princess Alice, Duchess of Gloucester – to be colonel-in-chief, Royal New Zealand Army Service Corps.
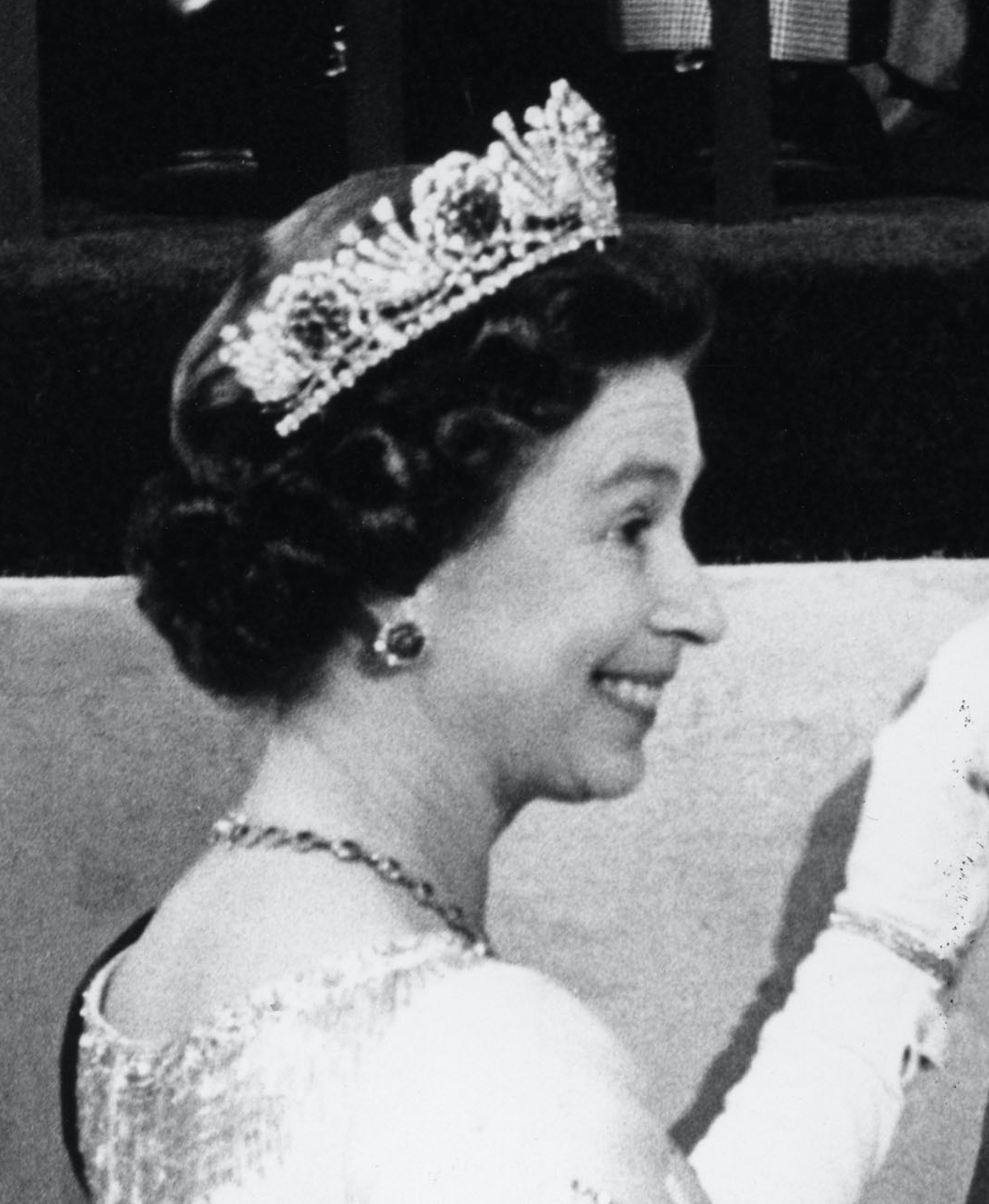
The Queen

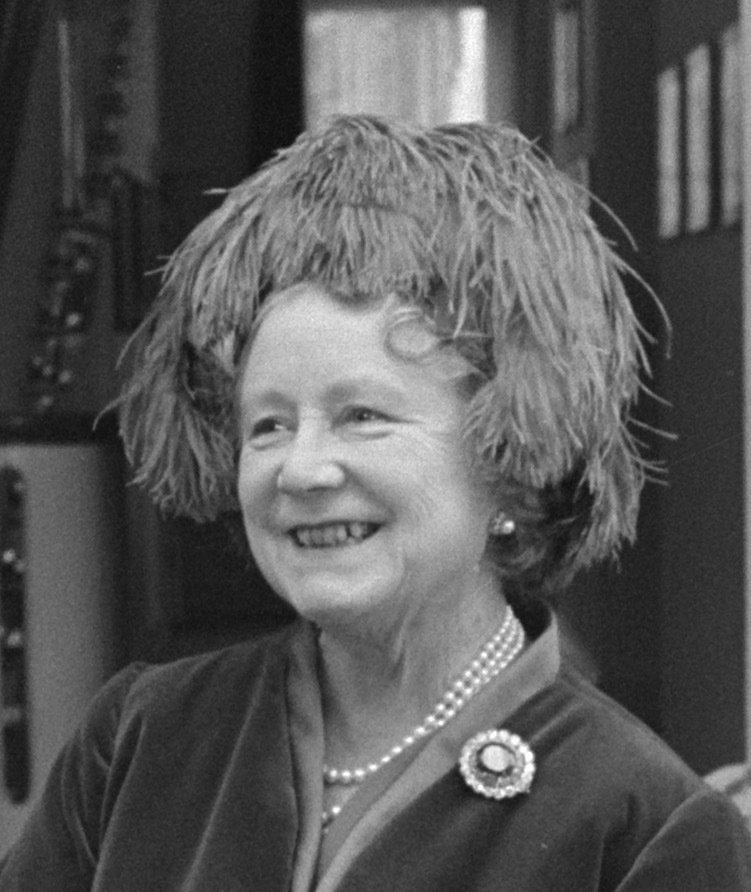
The Queen Mother

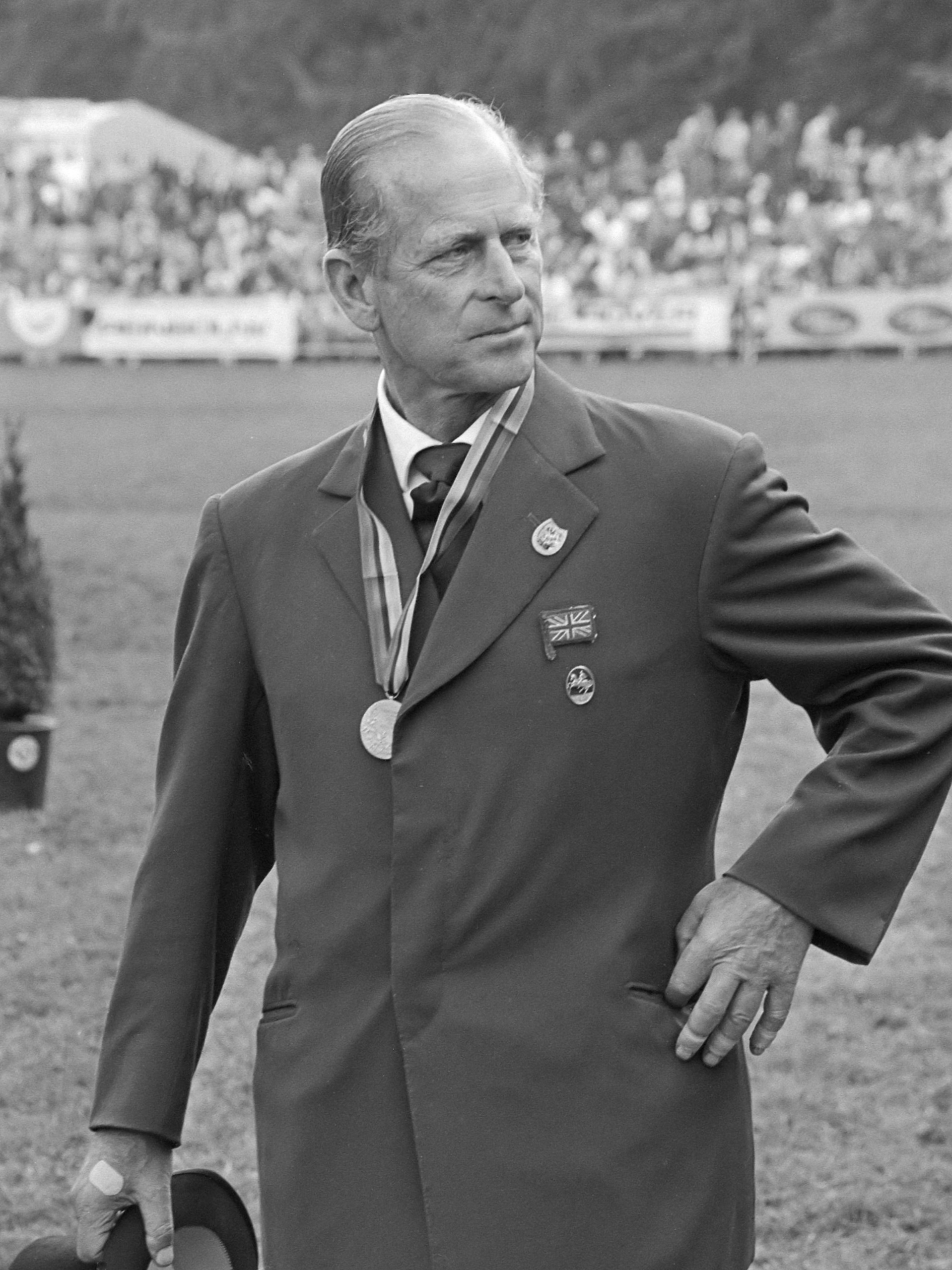
The Duke of Edinburgh

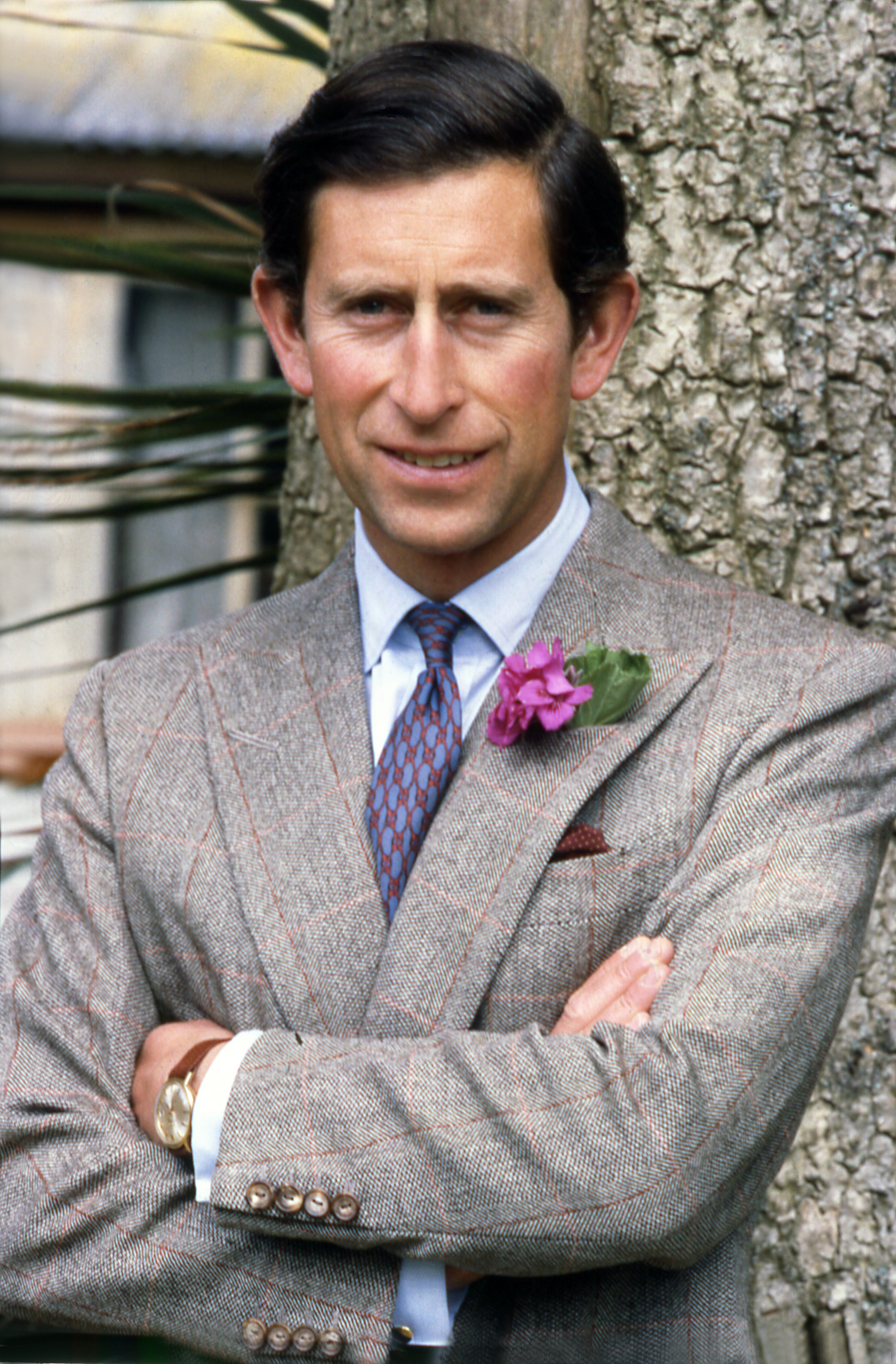
The Prince of Wales

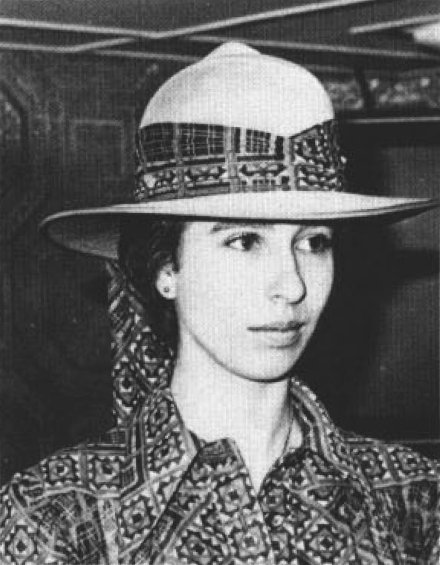
The Princess Anne

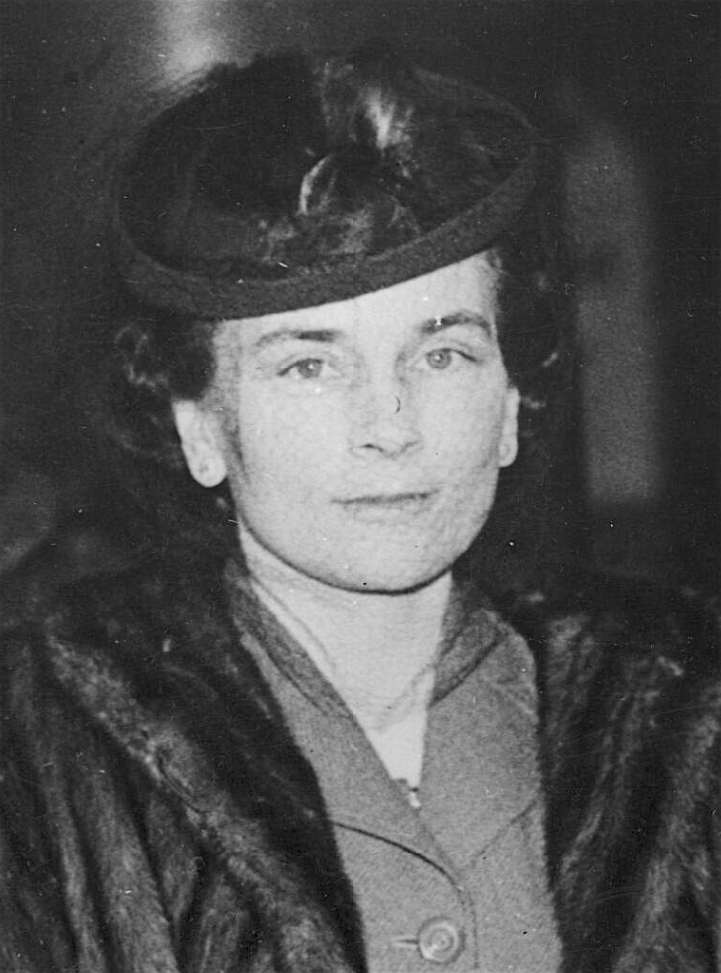
Princess Alice, Duchess of Gloucester

== Order of the Companions of Honour (CH) ==
Additional member

- The Right Honourable Robert David Muldoon MP – of Wellington; Prime Minister of New Zealand.
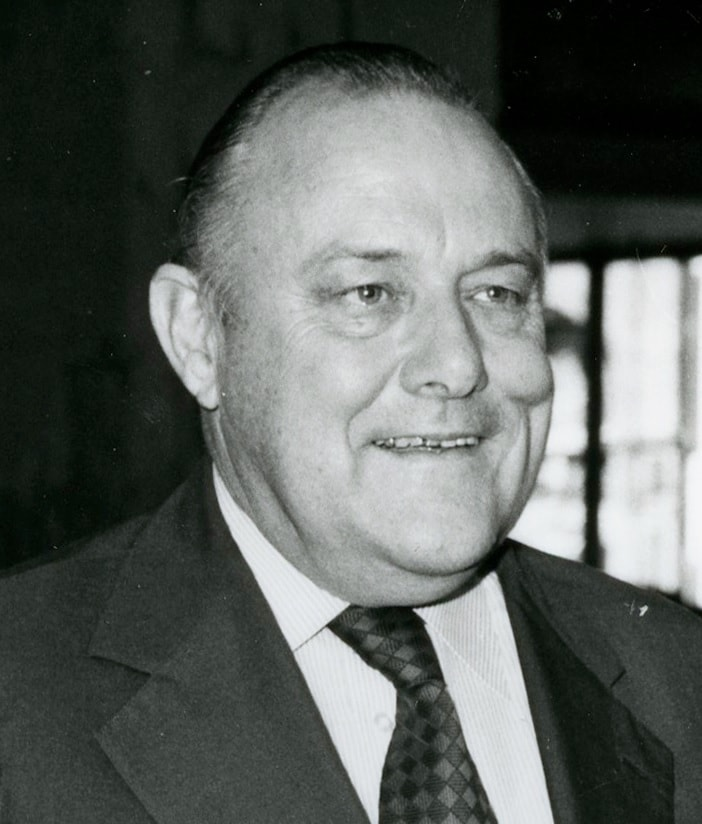
Robert Muldoon

== Knight Bachelor ==
- Alan Roberts Low – of Lower Hutt; governor of the Reserve Bank of New Zealand, 1967–1977.
- Kenneth Ben Myers MBE – of Auckland. For services to commerce and the community.
- Jack Newman CBE JP – of Nelson. For services to the travel industry, commerce and the community.
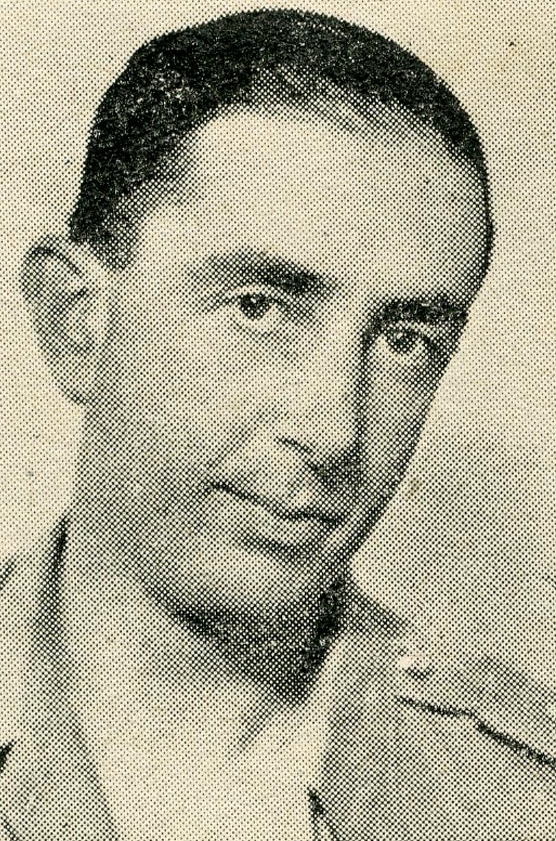
Sir Ken Myers

== Order of the Bath ==
=== Companion (CB) ===
Military division

- Rear Admiral John Foster McKenzie CBE – Chief of Naval Staff.

== Order of Saint Michael and Saint George ==
=== Knight Commander (KCMG) ===
- The Honourable Douglas Julian Carter – of London. For public services, lately as New Zealand high commissioner in the United Kingdom.
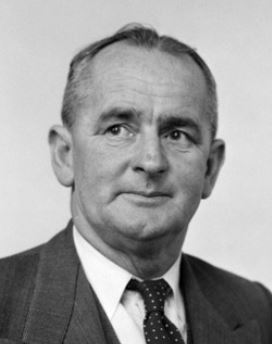
Sir Douglas Carter

=== Companion (CMG) ===
- Lester John Castle – of Wellington; president of the New Zealand Law Society, 1974–1977.
- The Honourable Robert Richmond Rex OBE – Premier of Niue.

== Order of the British Empire ==
=== Dame Commander (DBE) ===
Civil division

- Dr Cecily Mary Wise Pickerill OBE – of Upper Hutt. For services to medicine, especially in the field of plastic surgery.

=== Knight Commander (KBE) ===
Civil division

- Dr Randal Forbes Elliott OBE – of Wellington. For services to medicine.
- The Right Honourable Sir Clifford Parris Richmond – of Wellington; president of the Court of Appeal of New Zealand.

=== Commander (CBE) ===
Civil division

- Dr Roger Shepherd Duff FRSNZ – of Christchurch. For services as director of the Canterbury Museum since 1948.
- Ernest Raymond Elliot – of Wellington; commissioner, Salvation Army. For services to the community.
- Harold Philip Fowler OBE – of Invercargill. For services to education.
- Dr Alan Tutton Johns FRSNZ – of Wellington; Director-General of Agriculture since 1968.
- Peter John Luxford – of Wellington. For services as executive director of the New Zealand Employers' Federation.
- Dr William Anderson McGillivray FRSNZ JP – of Palmerston North. For services as director of New Zealand Dairy Research Institute since 1965.
- Maurice Paykel – of Auckland. For services to manufacturing industry and the community.
- Dr Kenneth Edmund Seal – of Auckland. For services to New Zealand aid programme in Indonesia.
- Mark Wallace Sr MBE JP – of Hokitika. For services to local government and farming.
- David Claverly Williams CVO – Official Secretary to the Governor-General since 1960.

Military division

- Air Commodore Harold Gordon Moss AFC – head, New Zealand Defence Liaison Staff, Canberra.
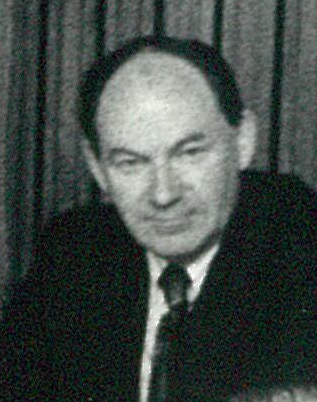
William McGillivray

=== Officer (OBE) ===
Civil division

- Patricia Maureen Bartlett – of Lower Hutt. For services to the community.
- Reginald Seymour Bates – of Waihou. For services to dairy and coalmining industries.
- Lloyd Elsmore JP – of Auckland. For services to local-body and community affairs.
- Dr Morgan Francis Fahey – of Christchurch. For services to the community. (Note: Appointment annulled and cancelled in 2000.)
- Lewis William Newlands Fitch – of Upper Hutt. For services to veterinary science.
- Lester Longueville Charles Griffiths JP – of Taradale. For services to the community.
- Brother Francis Patrick Henery – of Dunedin, For services to education and sport.
- Henry Hutchinson – of Greymouth. For services to the community.
- Norman Heyworth Law – of Hamilton. For services as director of the Meat Industry Research Institute of New Zealand since 1957.
- Ruth Margaret Lilico – of Invercargill. For services to social welfare.
- Dr John Colin Lopdell – of Auckland; medical superintendent, medical social services, Auckland Hospital Board since 1961.
- Te Uira Tuteao Manihera – of Hamilton. For services to Māori people and community.
- Dr Diana Manby Mason – of Wellington. For services to the community.
- Patricia Stella McMinn (Mrs Randrup) – of Auckland. For services to entertainment.
- John William Overton – Assistant Commissioner, New Zealand Police.
- Roy Cyril Stoneham – of Kawerau. For services to the community.
- Catherine Wilhelmina Vautier – of Palmerston North. For services to sport and the community.
- Edwina Diana Patricia Walker – of Auckland. For services to the community and women's affairs.

Military division

- Commander William Stewart Watson – Royal New Zealand Navy.
- Lieutenant Colonel Kenneth Montrose Gordon – Royal New Zealand Infantry Regiment.
- Colonel Maxwell Tebbutt – Colonels' List, New Zealand Army.
- Group Captain Reginald Thorpe – Royal New Zealand Air Force.
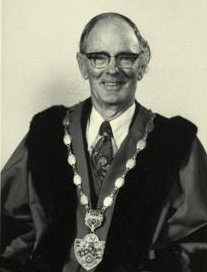
Lloyd Elsmore

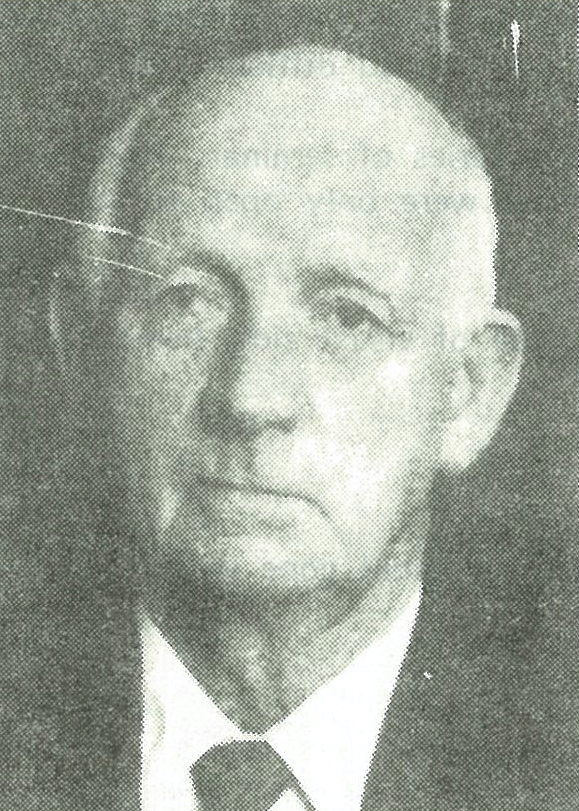
Lou Fitch

=== Member (MBE) ===
Civil division

- Stanley Nicholas Bakulich – of Dargaville. For services to trade-union affairs.
- William Arthur Black – of Te Anau. For services to search and rescue operations.
- Raymond Stanley Boyce – of Wellington. For services to the arts.
- Ronald Hugh Davis – of Napier. For services to the building industry and community.
- Mary Eileen Gillies (Sister Mary Justine) – of Auckland. For services to education.
- Kenneth Ralph Gillon – of Napier. For services to the community and local-body affairs.
- Otto Gram – of Taumarunui. For services to search and rescue operations.
- Richard Stopford Higginbotham – of Auckland. For services to the community.
- Marie Jean Hobbs – of Auckland. For services to women's bowling.
- Grenville Frederick Hughes – of Papakura. For services to horseracing as a jockey.
- Marion Elizabeth Jackman – of Wellington. For services to sport, especially athletics.
- Helene Douglas Love McIver – of Timaru. For services to the community.
- Andrew McNicol – of Auckland. For services to the education and training of intellectually handicapped children.
- Charles Norman Nicholls – of Auckland. For services to horticulture, athletics and the community.
- George Alexander Ronald Petrie – of Invercargill. For services to horticulture.
- Arthur Richard Rackley – of Dunedin. For services to the arts and community.
- Peter Riwaru Ririnui – of Tauranga. For services to the community and trade-union affairs.
- Nellie Elizabeth Robertson – of Palmerston North. For services to the community.
- Colin Desmond Smith – of Hamilton. For services to the community.
- Victor Gerald Spiller – of Christchurch. For services to local-body and community affairs
- Frederick John Taylor JP – of Eltham. For services to the community.
- Agnes Theodore (Akinihi Tiatoa) JP – of Auckland. For services to the community in Ōtara.
- Thomas Grace Tyrer – of Waikanae Beach. For services to agricultural journalism.
- John Thomas Voyle – of Cambridge. For services to sport.
- Alvin Harry Woolven JP – of Hamilton. For services to the dairy industry.

Military division

- Warrant Officer Richard Keith Berge – Royal New Zealand Navy
- Lieutenant Commander Victor William Fifield – Royal New Zealand Navy.
- Warrant Officer Class II Allan Harold Blackler – Royal New Zealand Infantry Regiment (Territorial Force).
- Warrant Officer Class II Edwin Te Runa Chadwick – Royal New Zealand Army Service Corps.
- Temporary Major and Quartermaster Clifford Raymond Parker – Royal New Zealand Engineers.
- Temporary Lieutenant Colonel Lawrence Henry Pilling – Royal New Zealand Infantry Regiment.
- Squadron Leader Donald Bruce Dalzell – Royal New Zealand Air Force.
- Squadron Leader William Henry Hillman – Royal New Zealand Air Force.
- Squadron Leader Gordon Thompson – Royal New Zealand Air Force.

== British Empire Medal (BEM) ==
Civil division

- Eleanor Elizabeth Alden – of Dunedin. For services as a Plunket nurse.
- Thomas Ralph Birdsall – of Hamilton. For services to education and the community.
- William John Burton – of Gisborne. For services to sport, especially rifle shooting and archery.
- James Michael Cashman JP – of Tākaka. For services to the community.
- Jessie Lois Edwards – of Invercargill. For services to nursing.
- Carl Rubenstein Prime – of Auckland. For services to the community.
- Keitha Beamish-White – of Rotorua. For services to the tourist industry.

Military division

- Chief Radio Mechanic Gary Raymond Cousins – Royal New Zealand Navy.
- Chief Petty Officer Peter Ernest Joseph Kneebone – Royal New Zealand Navy.
- Staff Sergeant David George Arps – Royal New Zealand Army Service Corps.
- Sergeant Roland Joseph Horopapera MM – Royal New Zealand Infantry Regiment.
- Temporary Warrant Officer Class II Gordon Arthur Nairn – Royal New Zealand Infantry Regiment (Territorial Force).
- Temporary Warrant Officer Class II Arthur Richard Tristram – Royal New Zealand Infantry Regiment.
- Leading Aircraftman Michael Andrew Naus – Royal New Zealand Air Force.
- Flight Sergeant Awhetu Te Rangi Waiariki – Royal New Zealand Air Force.

== Companion of the Queen's Service Order (QSO) ==
=== For community service ===
- Ulva Lynn Belsham – of Riverton.
- James Garfield Johnson – of Auckland.
- Hilma Bjarn Moen – of Whakatāne,
- John Donald Murray SM – Magistrate's Chambers, Magistrate's Court, Dunedin.
- Baden Nolan Norris – of Christchurch.
- Esme Irene Tombleson – of Gisborne.
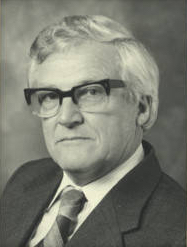
Garfield Johnson

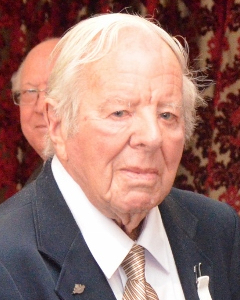
Baden Norris

=== For public services ===
- Joyce Isobel Crowley – of New Plymouth.
- Dr Irwin Bruce Faris – of Auckland.
- Cecil William Franks MBE – of Wellington; lately Assistant to the Director-General of Agriculture.
- John Kennedy-Good JP – mayor of the City of Lower Hutt.
- Leon Abraham Manning JP – mayor of Onehunga.
- Charles Kenroy Munro JP – of Whangārei.
- Walter Ian Munro JP – of Taihape.
- Jack Rogers – of Auckland; superintendent, Mount Eden Prison, Department of Justice.
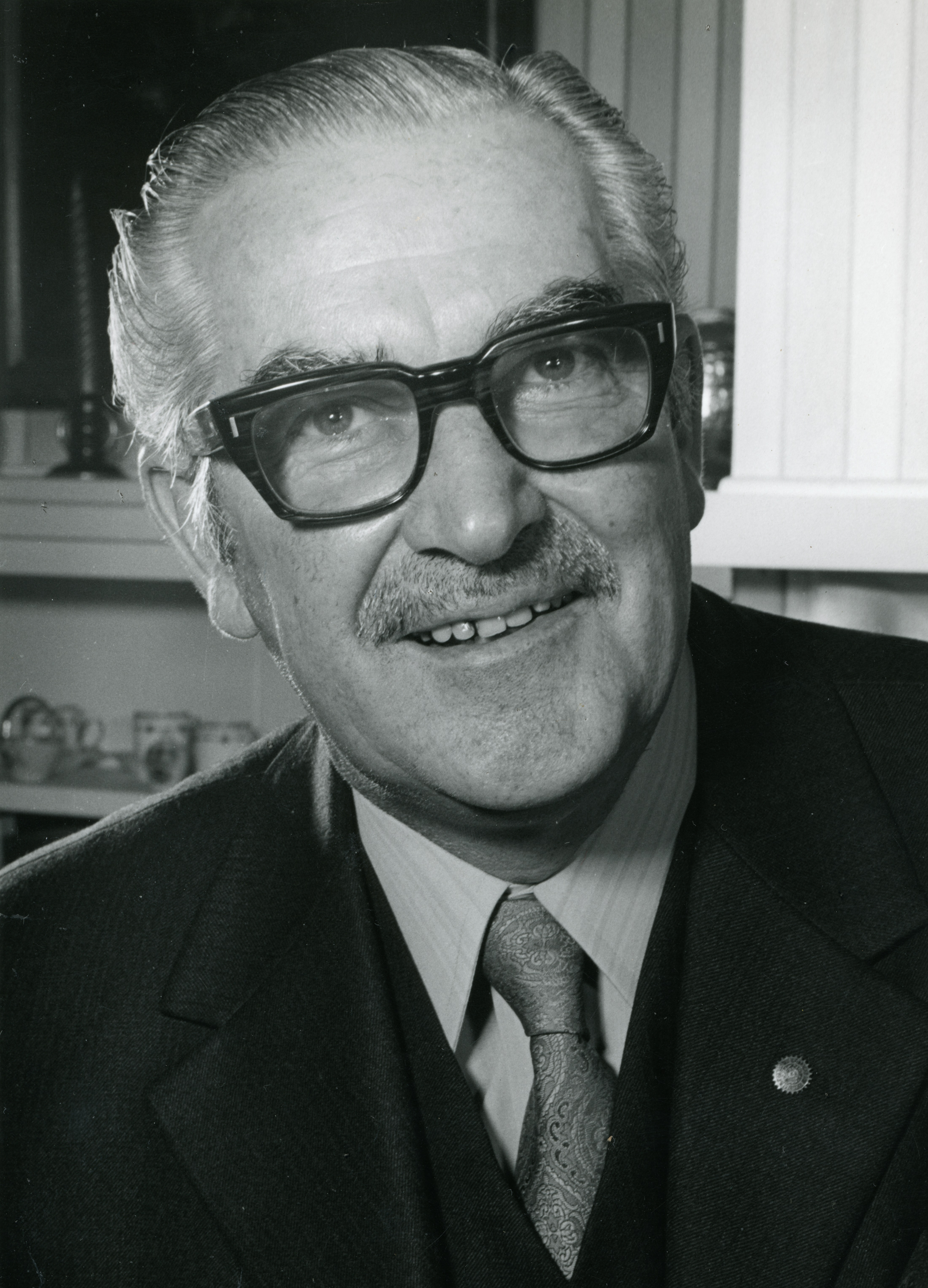
John Kennedy-Good

== Queen's Service Medal (QSM) ==
=== For community service ===
- Eileen Lucy Barry – of Tauranga.
- Ronald Edward George Cameron – of Christchurch.
- Francis Herbert Cramer – of Inglewood.
- Elaine Roma Delicate – of Plimmerton.
- Henry John Bowling – of Hamilton.
- Catherine Ellen Hancox – of Whangārei.
- Ruth Heagney – of Blenheim.
- Hyacinth Jordan Jenkins – of Masterton.
- James Claude Percival Kirkland – of Invercargill.
- William Henry Ross Kydd JP – of Taumarunui.
- Myrtle Rita McElwain JP – of Papatoetoe.
- Rose McLaughlin – of Leeston.
- Foufouhetogia Marion McQuoid – of Auckland.
- Gordon John Alexander Nicholls – of Auckland.
- Barbara Mary Procter – of Auckland.
- Henry Coffield Bucknall Scott – of Stratford.
- Ivan Fletcher Somerville – of Balclutha.
- Ivan Stanicich – of Christchurch.
- Ahenata Taiapa – of Porirua.
- Maraea Anne Te Kawa JP – of Ruatoria.
- Violet Mary Tuanui – of Chatham Islands.
- Henry Arthur Wilkinson – of Upper Hutt.
- Kenneth Ernest Young – of Taupō.

=== For public services ===
- Nora Jean Bourke JP – of Auckland.
- Edith Isabel Charteris – of Wellington; associate to the Chief Justice.
- Victor James Crimp JP – of Dunedin.
- Patricia Ellen Curtis – of Whangārei.
- John Williamson Dryden Hall JP – of Orewa.
- Leslie Robertson Hercus – of Dunedin.
- Cyril George Imrie – of Foxton Beach; lately Works Supervisor, Ministry of Works and Development, RNZAF Base Ohakea.
- Albert Melbourne Latta JP – of Ngāruawāhia.
- Taylor Samuel Mihaere JP – of Palmerston North.
- Leith Fennor Miles – senior sergeant, New Zealand Police.
- Veronica Denise Sexton – of Wellington; supervising shorthand typist, Department of Justice.
- Douglas Gilbert Simes – of Christchurch; transmission superintendent (Canterbury), New Zealand Electricity Department, Islington.

== Queen's Fire Service Medal (QFSM) ==
- Emrys Griffith Evans – chief fire officer (area commander), New Zealand Fire Service, Rotorua.
- Samuel Brown Irvine – chief executive (technical), New Zealand Fire Service Commission, Wellington.
- Robert Stanley Skipage – lately chief fire officer, Featherston Volunteer Fire Brigade.

== Queen's Police Medal (QPM) ==
- Robert Neville Cuthbert – constable, New Zealand Police.
- Laurence Ferguson Smith – sergeant, New Zealand Police.

== Air Force Cross (AFC) ==
- Wing Commander Donald William Pawson – Royal New Zealand Air Force.

== Air Force Medal (AFM) ==
- Sergeant Christopher Leonard Frederick Knight – Royal New Zealand Air Force.
