= 1977 New Zealand Royal Visit Honours =

Appointments to the Royal Victorian Order

1977 Royal Visit Honours
- Previous: 1977 New Year Honours; Next: 1977 Queen's Silver Jubilee and Birthday Honours
- Type: New Zealand royal honours: Royal Victorian Order
- Date: 22 February 1977
- Country: New Zealand
- Total recipients: 11

The 1977 New Zealand Royal Visit Honours were appointments by Elizabeth II to the Royal Victorian Order, to mark her silver jubilee visit to New Zealand that year. They were announced on 22 February 1977.

The recipients of honours are listed here as they were styled before their new honour.

== Royal Victorian Order ==
=== Commander (CVO) ===
- Kennedy Berclay Burnside OBE
- Donald Francis Ross MVO

=== Member, fourth class (MVO) ===
- John Lindell O'Sullivan
- Kenneth Owen Thompson

In 1984, Members of the Royal Victorian Order, fourth class, were redesignated as Lieutenants of the Royal Victorian Order (LVO).

=== Member, fifth class (MVO) ===
- Cyril Glynn Clear
- Francis William Gaucheron Diment BEM
- Michael Fitzgerald
- Harold Eugene Symonds
- Major John Selwyn Thorn
- Captain Nicholas Thornton

== Royal Victorian Medal ==
=== Silver (RVM) ===
- Gordon George McNab
