= 1977 New Zealand bravery awards =

The 1977 New Zealand bravery awards were announced in conjunction with the Queen's Silver Jubilee and Birthday Honours on 11 June 1977, and via a Special Honours List dated 22 December 1977, and recognised ten people for acts of bravery in 1976 and 1977.

== Queen's Gallantry Medal (QGM) ==
- Kenneth Trevor Penniall – of Auckland.
- David Alexander Jethro Hadley – of Auckland.

On 4 November 1976, an armed man robbed the National Bank of New Zealand Ltd., at East Tāmaki, Auckland.

At the time Mr Penniall was a customer in the Bank and when the offender made off Mr Penniall followed in his utility vehicle accompanied by Mr Hadley, who had been in a near-by shop. They followed the offender for some distance and at Pakuranga they found him sitting on his motor-cycle in a parking area. The offender attempted to flee but was foiled by Mr Penniall driving into the motor-cycle and knocking it to the ground. Mr Hadley then alighted and tackled the offender. At this stage the offender produced the loaded sawn-off shotgun used in the hold-up and threatened to shoot Mr Hadley. This did not deter Mr Hadley who threw himself at the offender, deflecting the weapon in the process. Mr Penniall joined in the scuffle and together they were able to overpower the offender and hold him until the Police and other people arrived at the scene.

Both Mr Penniall and Mr Hadley were in danger of death or injury at the hands of the offender. The courage they displayed resulted in a dangerous armed offender being apprehended and $14,000 recovered in a matter of minutes following the offence.

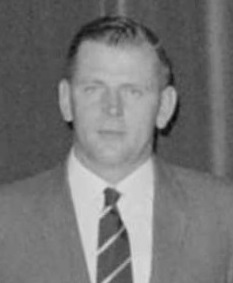
Dave Hadley

== Queen's Commendation for Brave Conduct ==
- Michael Thomas Lawson – of Waimauku.
- Kenneth Arnold Lovell – of Waimauku.
- Brian Baker – of Mairangi Bay.

For services leading to the rescue of a fisherman who had been swept off the rocks at Muriwai Beach by turbulent seas on the morning of 30 May 1976.

- Ronald Edmund Sanders Lorton – prison officer, Waikeria Youth Centre.

For services rendered during a riot at the Waikeria Youth Centre on 31 October 1976.

- Constable Douglas Robert Smith – New Zealand Police; of Taupō

For services leading to the arrest of a 17-year-old youth who was in possession of a .303 rifle which he had twice fired with serious intentions of causing injury if not death to the persons present. The incident occurred at Taupo on 13 February 1977.

- Constable Miles Hearn Paignton – New Zealand Police; of Rotorua.

Constable Paignton is a Police dog handler stationed at Rotorua. On the night of 2 September 1977 when attempting to apprehend an offender, he became separated from his dog and in an ensuing violent fight was severely injured. The offender, with assistance from some patrons from a nearby hotel, was able to make his escape and was not recaptured until the following day.

== Queen's Commendation for Valuable Service in the Air ==
- Russell Godfrey Gutschlag – of Nelson; pilot, Helicopters (NZ) Ltd.
- John William Reid MBE – of Nelson; general manager, Helicopters (NZ) Ltd.

For services leading to the successful rescue of 13 seamen from the Japanese squid boat, "Maru Daimaru Nr 2", that grounded on the rocks to the north of the Heaphy River mouth on the West Coast of the South Island on 4 January 1977.
