= 1993 Birthday Honours (New Zealand) =

Awards list for New Zealand

The 1993 Queen's Birthday Honours in New Zealand, celebrating the official birthday of Elizabeth II, were appointments made by the Queen in her right as Queen of New Zealand, on the advice of the New Zealand government, to various orders and honours to reward and highlight good works by New Zealanders. They were announced on 12 June 1993.

The recipients of honours are listed here as they were styled before their new honour.

== Order of the Bath ==
=== Companion (CB) ===
Military division

- Rear Admiral Ian Alexander Hunter – Chief of Naval Staff, Royal New Zealand Navy.

== Order of Saint Michael and Saint George ==
=== Companion (CMG) ===
- Kerrin Margaret Vautier – of Auckland. For services to economics and business management.

== Order of the British Empire ==
=== Dame Commander (DBE) ===
Civil division

- The Reverend Dr Phyllis Myra Guthardt – of Lyttelton. For services to the Methodist Church and women.
- Louise Etiennette Sidonie Henderson – of Auckland. For services to art.
- Dawn Ruth Lamb – of Christchurch. For services to education.
- (Georgina Catriona Pamela) Augusta Wallace – of Auckland; lately a District Court judge.

=== Commander (CBE) ===
Civil division

- Susan Elizabeth Anne Devoy MBE – of Auckland. For services to squash and the community.
- Teresa Eileen Friel – of Christchurch. For services to the community.
- Dr Owen Fillbridge Haylock JP – of Bulls. For services to the timber industry and the community.
- Dr Helen Hannah Rigg Hughes – of Wellington; Parliamentary Commissioner for the Environment.
- The Reverend Elinor Glenys Lewis – of Christchurch. For services to the Anglican Church.
- Shirley Jean Martin – of Wellington. For services to the community.
- Norton Ross Moller – of Ōakura. For services to business management and the community.
- Dr Alfred Philip Poole – of Queenstown. For services to medicine and the community.

Military division

- Brigadier Piers Martin Reid – Brigadiers' List, New Zealand Army.
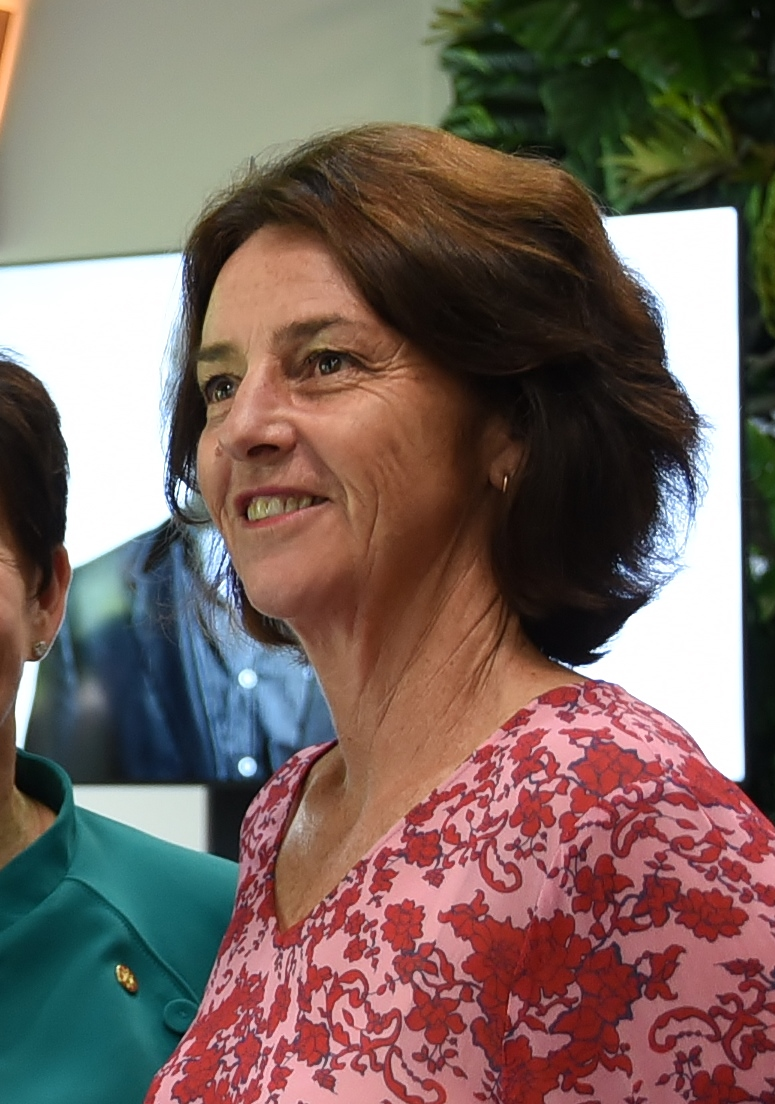
Susan Devoy

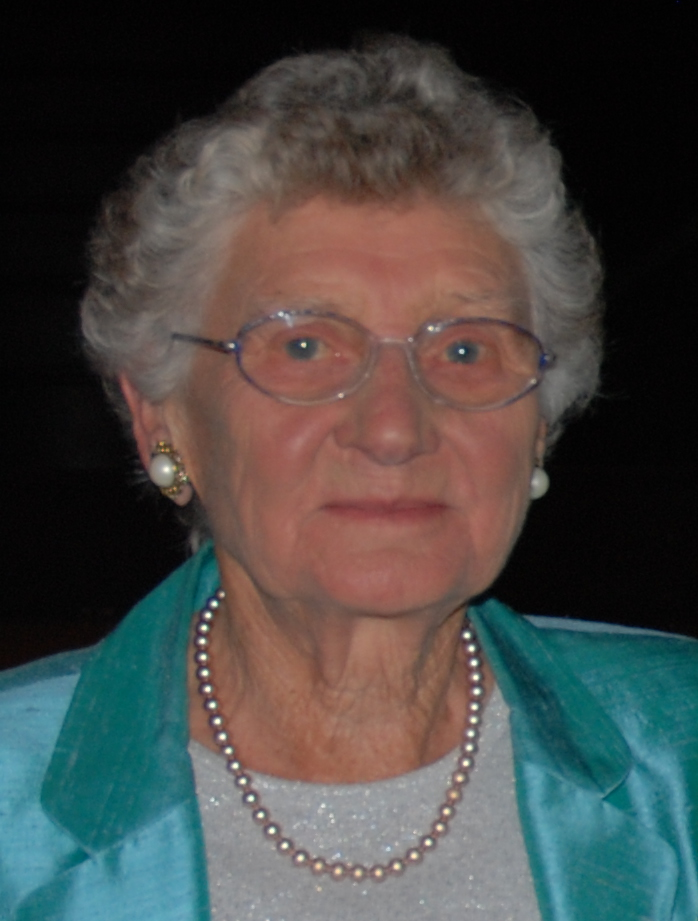
Helen Hughes

=== Officer (OBE) ===
Civil division

- Denis Frederick Adam – of Wellington. For services to the arts and community.
- Te Aue Takotoroa Davis JP – of Auckland. For services to weaving and the community.
- Professor Mary Davidson Earle – of Palmerston North. For services to food technology.
- Brian Timothy Finn – of Cambridge. For services to music.
- Neil Mullane Finn – of Cambridge. For services to music.
- Dr Dorothy Margaret Anne Gronwall – of Auckland. For services to neuropsychology.
- Ashley Robert Groom. – of Greymouth For services to tourism and the community.
- Douglas Ian Howell – of Christchurch. For services to business management.
- Andrew James Duncan Laing – of Dunedin. For services to sport, especially swimming.
- Rosanne Philippa O'Loghlen Meo – of Auckland. For services to business management.
- Barry John Paterson – of Hamilton. For services to cricket.
- Brian Richard Perry – of Hamilton. For services to business management and the community.
- Shirley Joan Ross – of Auckland. For services to the community.
- Bruce Fergus Scott RVM – assistant commissioner, New Zealand Police.
- Jean Annie Walsh JP – of Hamilton. For services to education and the community.

Military division

- Commander John Robert Meldrum – Royal New Zealand Navy.
- Colonel Richard Paul Gray – Colonels' List, New Zealand Army.
- Wing Commander Peter Alexander Williamson – Royal New Zealand Air Force.
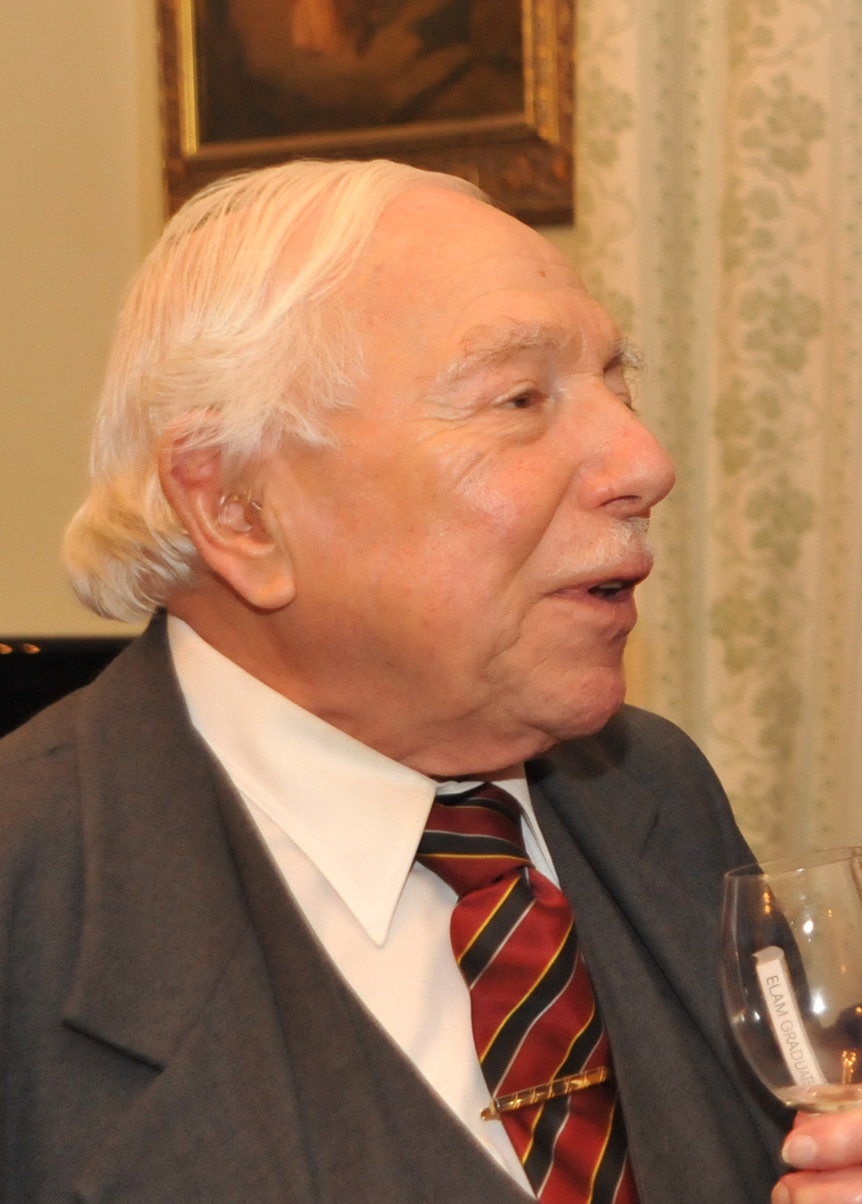
Denis Adam

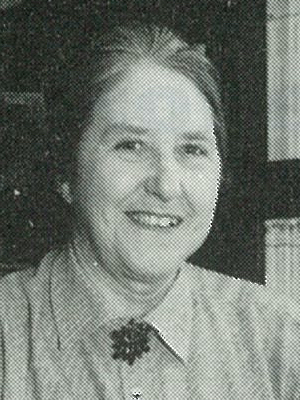
Mary Earle

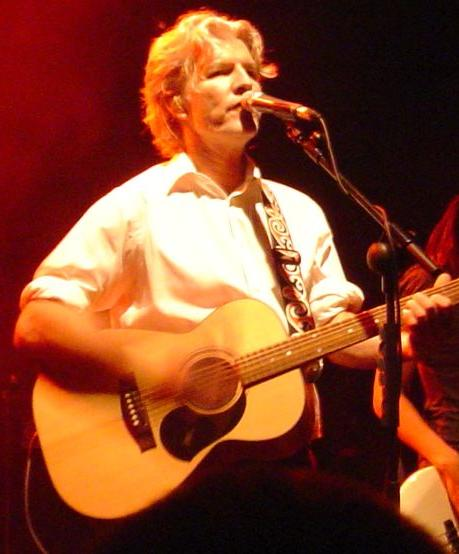
Tim Finn

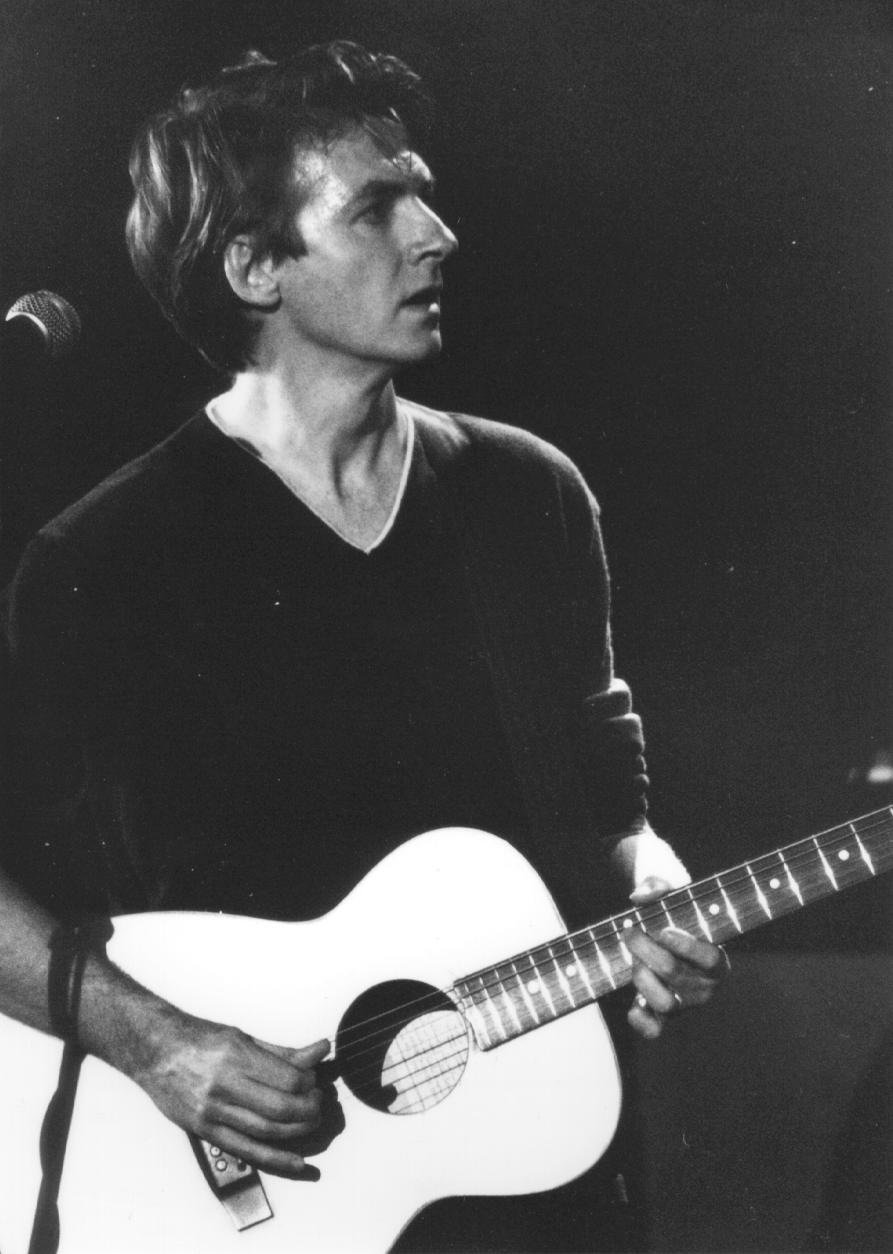
Neil Finn

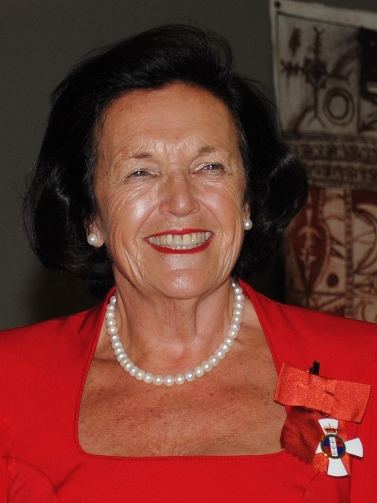
Rosanne Meo

=== Member (MBE) ===
Civil division

- Elisabeth Farrant Airey – of Wellington. For services to music.
- Christopher Arthur Amon – of Bulls. For services to motor sport.
- Dorothy June Bell – of Auckland. For services to the Girls' Brigade and the community.
- Robert Victor Browne JP – of Auckland. For services to the accounting profession.
- Matthew Harold Cameron JP – of Te Puke. For services to local government.
- The Honourable Frederick Miroslav Gerbic – of Auckland. For public services.
- Major Margaret Evangel Hay – of Upper Hutt. For services to the Salvation Army.
- Mary Elizabeth Fairmaid Johnson – of Napier. For services to local-body and community affairs.
- Dr Robert Paul Kibblewhite – of Rotorua. For services to science.
- Blanche Lois Kingdon JP – of Rotorua. For services to welfare work.
- Robin Margot Laing – of Wellington. For services to the film industry.
- Barbara Rae Mabbett – of Wellington. For services to education.
- Esme Leone Marris – of Wellington. For services to business and economic affairs.
- Jennifer Anne McMahon – of Dunedin. For services to welfare work.
- Norman James McMillan – of Paeroa. For services to local-body and community affairs.
- Ralph Hamilton Roberts JP – of Auckland. For services to yachting.
- Pamela Dawn Robinson – of Auckland. For services to the community.
- Allison Pamela Roe – of Auckland. For services to athletics.
- Maxwell Rex Short JP – of Pukekohe. For services to local government.
- Orma Maud Emily Smith – of Timaru. For services to dancing.
- Murray Mayell Sweetman – of Auckland. For services to the community. (Note: Deceased 31 May 1993. Her Majesty's approval of this appointment was signified before the date of decease.)
- (Robert) Blyth Tait – of Pukekohe. For services to equestrian sport.
- Geoffrey Dawson Taylor – of Alexandra. For services to the fruitgrowing industry.
- Maurice George Wall – of Ashburton. For services to local-body and community affairs.

Military division

- Warrant Officer Kenneth Alan Bancroft – Royal New Zealand Navy.
- Squadron Leader Noel Ward – Royal New Zealand Air Force.
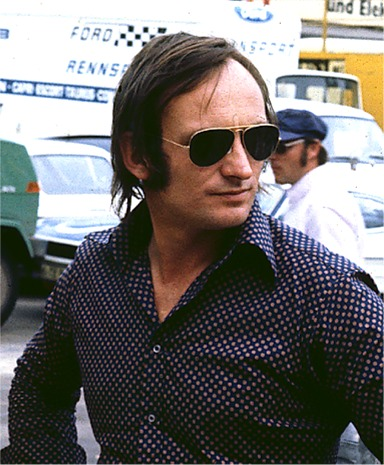
Chris Amon

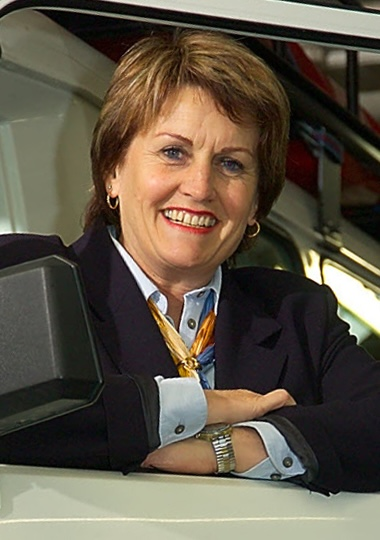
Jenny McMahon

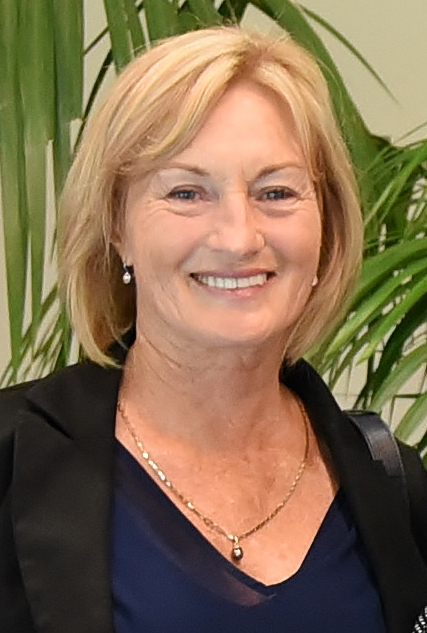
Allison Roe

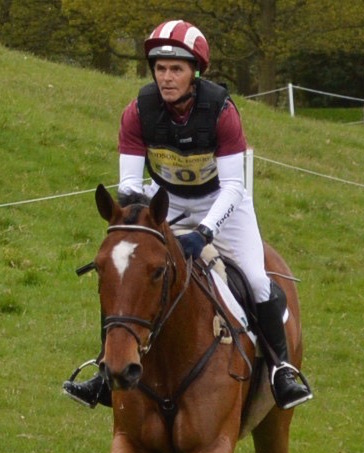
Blyth Tait

== British Empire Medal (BEM) ==
Military division

- Chief Petty Officer Christopher Hikairo Cookson – Royal New Zealand Navy.
- Chief Petty Officer Christopher John Halliday – Royal New Zealand Navy.
- Sergeant Michael James Cleeton – Royal New Zealand Air Force.
- Flight Sergeant Murray Edward Ransfield – Royal New Zealand Air Force.

== Companion of the Queen's Service Order (QSO) ==
=== For community service ===
- Boudewijn Huibrecht (Boyd Hubert) Klap – of Wellington.
- Dr Ronald Mackenzie – of Wellington.
- Huriwaha Maniapoto – of Tūrangi.
- Patricia Mary Payne – of Wanganui.
- Jeanne Helen Wood – of Christchurch.
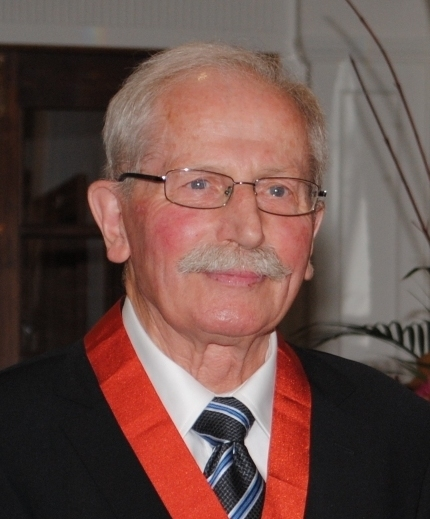
Boyd Klap

=== For public services ===
- Selwyn John Begley JP – of Hastings.
- Elizabeth Anne Biddles – of Dargaville.
- David Lloyd Lean JP – of New Plymouth.
- Margaret Ann Bedggood Mulgan – of Auckland.
- The Honourable Herbert Elmer Lorraine Pickering JP – of Blenheim.
- Alison Burns Quentin-Baxter – of Wellington.
- Georgina Manunui te Heuheu – of Taupō.
- Colonel Thomas Frederick Llewellyn Ward OBE ED JP - of Tangiteroria; New Zealand Army (Retired)
- Barbara Frances Watson – of Auckland.
- The Honourable Mervyn Langlois Wellington – of Lower Hutt.
- May Naumai Woodcock JP – of Hamilton.
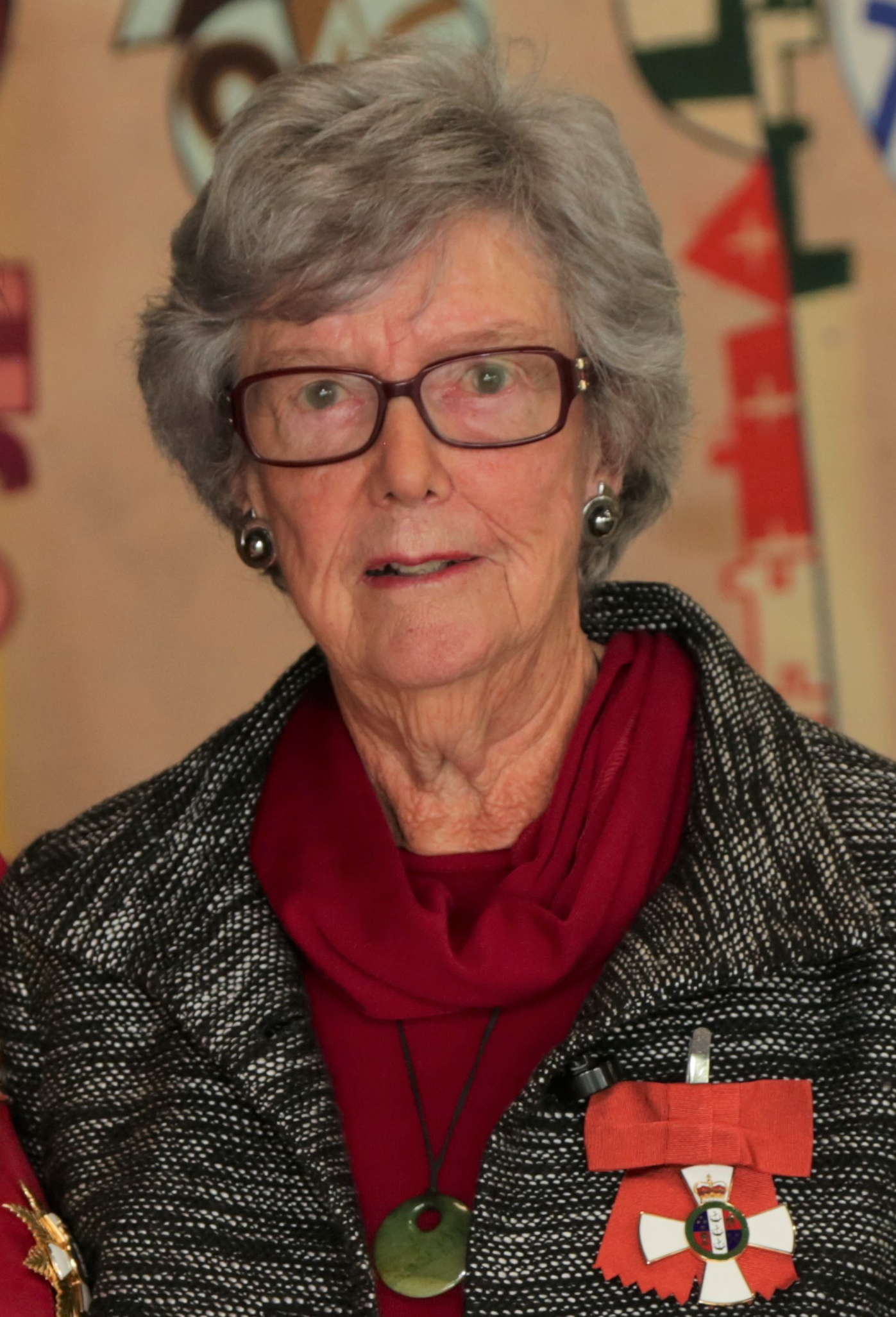
Margaret Bedggood

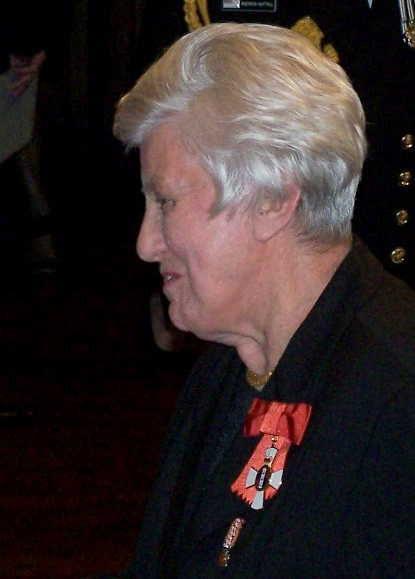
Alison Quentin-Baxter

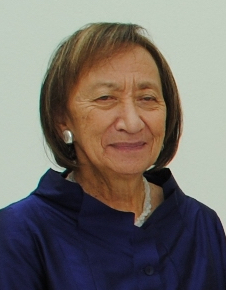
Georgina te Heuheu

== Queen's Service Medal (QSM) ==
=== For community service ===
- Joyce Evelyn Bennett – of Timaru.
- Emilie Jean Bockman – of Papakura.
- Gordon Frederick Burrows – of Christchurch.
- Patricia Mary, Lady Caughey – of Auckland.
- Myrtle Jessie Christie – of Whangārei.
- Joy Winning Keir Clark – of Masterton.
- The Venerable Archdeacon Anthony Ivan Clarke – of Hamilton.
- Erle Pickard Coleman – of New Plymouth.
- Angela Mary Cairns Costello – of Blenheim.
- Zillah Dixie Day – of Waiheke Island.
- Donald James Fraser – of Mossburn.
- Bettie Emma Garratt – of Upper Hutt.
- John Stewart Gray – of Rakaia.
- Muriel Peggy Hanan – of Morrinsville.
- Mary Latchmore Hassett – of Mangōnui.
- Morice Murray Hennessy – of Richmond.
- Peter Charles Henwood JP – of Christchurch.
- Rosemary Anne Horton – of Auckland.
- June Elizabeth Jones – of Oamaru.
- Luseane Fukofuka Koloi – of Auckland.
- Randal George Cannon McMurtry – of Upper Moutere.
- Peter Gustavus Lang Morton – of Invercargill.
- Sundarshan-Kumari Rajpal – of Upper Hutt.
- Deacon Elva May Reynolds – of Hokitika.
- Stanley Edward Rowe – of Matamata.
- Nancy Simcox – of Ōtaki.
- Louise Juliet Sutherland – of Waihola.
- Raymon Pakimana (Tommy) Taurima – of Auckland.
- Jonathan Willam Edward Tucker – of Invercargill.
- Jocelyn Ann Whitehouse – of Levin.
- Olive Kathleen Wilkinson – of Tokoroa.
- Keitha Jean Wilson – of Pukekohe.
- Nanette Worgan – of Wellington.
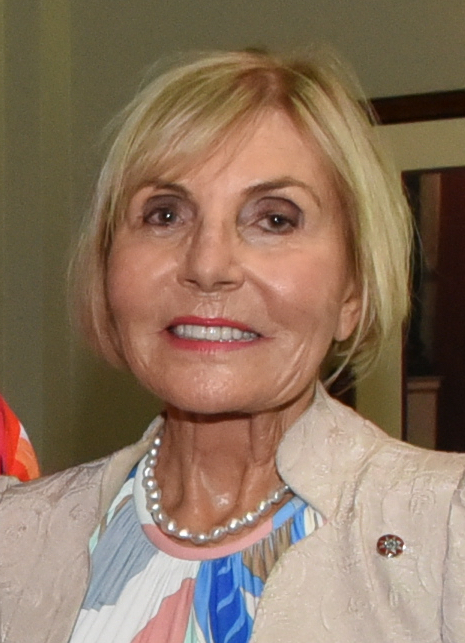
Rosie Horton

=== For public services ===
- John Henry Black JP – of Christchurch.
- George Raymond Bransgrove – of Milton.
- Geraldine (Gendy) Buller – of Te Awamutu.
- John Matthew Taupaki Cribb JP – of Kaikohe.
- Percy Bailey Lucas Cubitt – of Waihi.
- Dr Shirley Juliette Dowding – of Gisborne.
- Frank Geoffrey Fairfield – of Auckland.
- Patricia Molly Gilberd – of Auckland.
- Enid Marjorie Hay – of Auckland.
- Francis George Howe JP – of Timaru.
- Jan (John) Stanislaw Jarka JP – of Manukau City.
- Basil Terence Johnson – of Rotorua.
- Norma Beverley Lewis JP – of Manukau City.
- Elizabeth Ann Lupton – of Dargaville.
- Sandra Joy Manderson – detective sergeant, New Zealand Police.
- George Mason – of Great Barrier Island.
- Daphne Frances McAven – of Christchurch.
- Ivan Leonard Morton – of Kaitaia.
- Shirley Dorothy Oakley – of Christchurch.
- Lapati Togakilo Paka – of Mutalau, Niue.
- Coral Mary Ridling – of Auckland.
- Mavis Jean Ring – of Wellington.
- Gordon Aropata Rongonui – senior sergeant, New Zealand Police.
- Patricia Helen Gillispie Ryan JP – of Napier.
- Robert Rawson Shaw – of Ōhope.
- Colin Erwin Douglas Sigglekow – of Auckland.
- Jean Smart – of Picton.
- Mere Tepaeru Tereora JP – of Wellington.
- George Thew – of Whangaparāoa.
- John Duncan Ussher – of Alexandra.
- Dr Geoffrey Llewellyn Walton – of Bulls.
- Dr Joan Eleanor Walton – of Bulls.
- Simon Hallows Wood – of Christchurch.
- Marlene Tira Woods JP – of Akaroa.
- Beatrice Tui Yates – of Rotorua.

== Queen's Fire Service Medal (QFSM) ==
- Raymond Noel Brokenshire – senior fire fighter, Temuka Volunteer Fire Brigade, New Zealand Fire Service.
- William John Lester – chief fire officer, Palmerston Volunteer Fire Brigade, New Zealand Fire Service.
- Robert Graham Sampson – fire force commander, No. 2 Region (Hamilton), New Zealand Fire Service.

== Queen's Police Medal (QPM) ==
- Anthony John Hill – detective senior sergeant, New Zealand Police.

== Air Force Cross (AFC) ==
- Squadron Leader John Keith Duxfield – Royal New Zealand Air Force.
