= Margaret Dalziel =

English literature scholar

Margaret Dalziel CBE
- Born: Edith Margaret Dalziel; 21 November 1916; Rangiora, New Zealand
- Died: 5 May 2003 (aged 86); Dunedin, New Zealand

Academic background
- Education: Canterbury University College (MA); University of Oxford (DPhil)
- Thesis: Cheap popular English fiction, 1840–1860, and the moral attitudes reflected in it (1952)

Academic work
- Institutions: University of Otago

Edith Margaret Dalziel CBE (21 November 1916 – 5 May 2003) was an English literature scholar at the University of Otago, Dunedin, New Zealand. She was the first female Pro-Vice Chancellor of the university.

== Biography ==
Dalziel was born in Rangiora in 1916; her parents were Robert and Eva Dalziel. She received her education at Rangiora District School and Rangiora High School. She then completed a master of arts degree at Canterbury University College in 1937 and a doctoral degree at the University of Oxford in 1953.

Dalziel was a frequent correspondent with Karl Popper and his wife Hennie from their time together at the University of Canterbury, and was thanked in the acknowledgments of his seminal work The Open Society and Its Enemies for assisting in the preparation of drafts and the final manuscript.

She joined the Department of English at the University of Otago in 1953, and remained with the department until her retirement in 1981. On her promotion to professor in 1966 she became the first female professor in the department. In 1971 she was elected Dean of the Faculty of Arts; she was Pro-Vice Chancellor from 1975 to 1977; and Head of Department of English from 1978 to 1980.

During her tenure, Dalziel taught and mentored Bill Manhire, who went on to become a notable New Zealand poet.

Dalziel died in Dunedin on 5 May 2003. Her family remembers her as an indomitable champion of women's rights in academia and a trailblazer for academic leadership.

== Recognition ==
In the 1976 New Year Honours, Dalziel was appointed a Commander of the Order of the British Empire, for services to education and literature. In 1981, the Department of English and Linguistics established an annual Margaret Dalziel Lecture in Dalziel's memory.

On her retirement, colleagues published a volume of essays in her honour: The Interpretive Power: Essays on Literature in Honour of Margaret Dalziel (University of Otago, 1980).

== Publications ==
- Popular Fiction 100 Years Ago (1957), Cohen & West
- Myth and the Modern Imagination (1967), University of Otago Press
- ed., Charlotte Lennox, The Female Quixote, or, The Adventures of Arabella (1970), Oxford University Press
- Janet Frame (1980), Oxford University Press
- "Looking back" in Greg Waite, Jocelyn Harris, Heather Murray and John Hale (eds), World and stage: essays for Colin Gibson (1998), University of Otago Department of English
