= Sandra Manderson =

Police commander from New Zealand

Sandra Joy Manderson
- Born: Sandra
- Citizenship: New Zealand
- Education: University of Canterbury Hagley College
- Occupation: Police officer
- Awards: Queen's Service Medal honorary doctor of the University of Canterbury

Sandra Joy Manderson QSM is a retired police officer and police commander from New Zealand. She was the first woman in the New Zealand Police to achieve the rank of Superintendent, the first woman District Commander and the first woman to serve as a New Zealand Police International Liaison Officer.

== Life ==
Manderson grew up in Christchurch and attended Hagley College and the University of Canterbury, graduating with a bachelor of science. She taught physical education for a year then applied to the police force. She qualified with 70 Recruit Wing on 15 January 1978 and began policing in Canterbury. She progressed through uniformed and CIB roles and in 1993 was appointed the first director of the Crime Prevention Unit at the Department of the Prime Minister and Cabinet in Wellington. She then held positions in Wellington District as a shift commander, and at Police National Headquarters. In 1999 she was promoted to superintendent in the role of National Manager Organisational Performance.

In 2002 Manderson returned to Canterbury to serve as District Commander for six years. In 2004 she travelled to Phuket, Thailand, to lead a disaster victim identification team in the wake of the 2004 Indian Ocean earthquake and tsunami. In 2008 Manderson was transferred to Washington D.C., where she spent four years as International Liaison Officer to the Americas covering the United States, Canada and South and Central America. Following the February 2011 Canterbury earthquakes Manderson returned to Christchurch to assist with police work in the aftermath of the disaster, then returned to Washington to complete her posting. On her return to New Zealand Manderson ran policing for a number of major events such as the 2012 visit of the Prince of Wales and Duchess of Cornwall, the 2015 ICC Cricket World Cup, the 2015 FIFA Under-20 World Cup and the World Masters Games, Lions tour and Rugby League World Cup in 2017.

Manderson retired from the police force in January 2018 after a 40-year career.

=== Recognition ===
In the 1993 Queen's Birthday Honours, Manderson was awarded the Queen's Service Medal for public services. In 2015 she received an honorary Doctor of Laws from the University of Canterbury.
