= Alan Johns =

New Zealand scientist, public servant and university administrator

Alan Johns CBE
- Born: Alan Tutton Johns; 22 May 1917; Amberley, New Zealand
- Died: 5 September 1997 (aged 80)
- Education: University of Cambridge
- Spouse: Marion Carville Jacobs (m. 1943)
- Children: 5
- Scientific career
- Thesis: The mechanism of propionic acid formation in fermentation with special reference to the rumen of the sheep (1949)

Alan Tutton Johns CBE (22 May 1917 – 5 September 1997) was a New Zealand scientist, science administrator and university council member.

== Early life ==
Johns was born on 22 May 1917 in Amberley, the son of Ada Constance Johns (née Tutton) and Alexander Leo Johns. He was educated at Christ's College in Christchurch, where he was prominent in middle-distance running and later in rowing. He joined the Canterbury Rowing Club. Johns studied at Canterbury University College, from where he completed a Master of Science with first-class honours in 1939; he also represented the university in rowing. He won three New Zealand national rowing titles. He joined the Department of Scientific and Industrial Research (DSIR) in 1940 at their Palmerston North office holding one of their scholarships. He enlisted for war service in 1944; at the time his occupation was recorded as research chemist.

After the war, Johns studied at Christ's College and Clare College of the University of Cambridge, graduating with a PhD. The title of his thesis, completed in 1949, was The mechanism of propionic acid formation in fermentation with special reference to the rumen of the sheep. While at Cambridge, he represented Clare College in rowing. In 1954, he was awarded a Dominion Civil Service Fellowship that enabled him to study in the United States.

== Career ==
Johns was director of the plant chemistry division at the DSIR in Palmerston North. At the Ministry of Agriculture and Fisheries, he was director of agriculture and involved in establishing the exclusive economic zone of New Zealand, which determined exclusive access for 200 nautical miles for New Zealand fisheries. From 1964 onwards, he was a member of the Massey University Council and from 1964 to 1967, he was Massey's pro-chancellor. From 1971 to 1973, he was on the council of the Food and Agriculture Organization (FAO). From 1967, he was on the National Research Advisory Council. From 1974, he served on the Wood Board. He retired in 1978.

== Honours and awards ==
In 1964, Johns was elected fellow of the Royal Society of New Zealand. He was also a fellow of the New Zealand Institute of Chemistry and the New Zealand Institute of Agricultural and Horticultural Science. He was appointed a Commander of the Order of the British Empire in the 1977 Birthday Honours for his role as director-general of agriculture. The same year, he was awarded the Queen Elizabeth II Silver Jubilee Medal. In 1977, the University of Canterbury conferred an honorary Doctor of Science (DSc). On 9 May 1985, Massey University also conferred an honorary DSc.

== Family ==
Johns got engaged to Marion Carville Jacobs in July 1942. She was from Palmerston North, the daughter of Mary and Bertram Joseph Jacobs. (Note: Her father was Dominion president of the Royal New Zealand Returned and Services' Association from 1943 to 1947) They married at St Andrew's Church in Palmerston North on 15 May 1943. Their first son was born on 8 July 1944 and their second son was born on 11 January 1948 in Cambridge, England. They had five sons in total. The family returned to New Zealand in November 1948.

Johns died on 5 September 1997 and he was cremated at the Karori Crematorium. His ashes were buried at Karori Cemetery half a year later in March 1998.
