= Phyllis Guthardt =

New Zealand Methodist minister (1929–2023)

The Reverend Dame Phyllis Guthardt DBE

11th Chancellor of the University of Canterbury
- In office 1998–2002
- Preceded by: Ian Leggat
- Succeeded by: Robin Mann

President of the Methodist Church of New Zealand
- In office 1 November 1985 – 1 November 1986
- Preceded by: Francis Hanson
- Succeeded by: Donald Phillipps

Personal details
- Born: Phyllis Myra Guthardt; 1 August 1929 Nelson, New Zealand
- Died: 29 June 2023 (aged 93) Christchurch, New Zealand
- Occupation: Methodist minister

Academic background
- Education: University of Cambridge
- Thesis: Sin and ignorance in biblical thought (1963)

Dame Phyllis Myra Guthardt DBE (1 August 1929 – 29 June 2023) was a New Zealand Methodist minister and women's leader. She served as chancellor of the University of Canterbury from 1998 to 2002.

== Early life and education ==
Phyllis Myra Guthardt was born on 1 August 1929 in Nelson, New Zealand. She became a teacher after completing her training at Christchurch Teachers' College, and taught in her hometown of Nelson, as well as Christchurch. She then pursued further education, completing a diploma at Trinity Theological College and a Bachelor of Arts degree from the University of Auckland. In 1959, she graduated from the University of Canterbury, in Christchurch, New Zealand, completing a master's degree in English with first-class honours.

== Career ==
When Guthardt was ordained as a Methodist minister in 1959, she became the first woman of any denomination to be ordained in New Zealand. She was later to be the first woman elected to the presidency of New Zealand's Methodist Church in 1985.

"In the early 1950s the Methodist Church decided it had nothing in principle against the ordination of women. In 1954 I moved from Christchurch, where I was working as a young teacher and studying part time at Canterbury University, to Auckland so I could enter Trinity College ... I completed my bachelor's degree at Auckland University and went on to study part-time and earn my MA in English while I was a probationer minister in Christchurch."

After 3½ years of parish ministry, Guthardt received a scholarship to attend the University of Cambridge. In addition to the scholarship, Methodist women around New Zealand raised £1000 to support her studies. At Cambridge she was a student at Newnham College; she earned her PhD in biblical studies. While in England, she tutored at Homerton College.

Returning to New Zealand, she served as presbyter at the Melville church in Hamilton and as a hospital chaplain.

Also in Hamilton, Guthardt began her long affiliation with New Zealand's tertiary education system. She was the first ecumenical chaplain at the University of Waikato and also lectured in English and religious studies.

After moving to Christchurch, Guthardt became involved with the University of Canterbury, where she served on the university council for 21 years, including a term as chancellor from 1998 to 2002. Guthardt served with the World Council of Churches, the Christian Conference of Asia, and the World Methodist Conference.

Guthardt died in Christchurch on 29 June 2023, at the age of 93.

== Honours ==
In the 1993 Queen's Birthday Honours, Guthardt was appointed a Dame Commander of the Order of the British Empire, for services to the Methodist Church and women.

Guthardt was conferred honorary doctorates by the University of Waikato in 1986 and the University of Canterbury in 2003.

Academic offices
Preceded by Ian Leggat	Chancellor of the University of Canterbury; 1998–2002	Succeeded by Robin Mann
