= 1996 in New Zealand =

- Decades: 1970s; 1980s; 1990s; 2000s; 2010s
- See also: History of New Zealand; List of years in New Zealand; Timeline of New Zealand history

The following lists events that happened during 1996 in New Zealand.

== Population ==
- Estimated population as of 31 December: 3,762,300.
- Increase since 31 December 1995: 55,600 (1.50%).
- Males per 100 Females: 97.3.

== Incumbents ==
=== Regal and viceregal ===
- Head of State - Elizabeth II
- Governor-General - The Hon Dame Catherine Tizard, ONZ, GCMG, GCVO, DBE, QSO, DStJ followed by The Rt Hon. Sir Michael Hardie Boys GNZM, GCMG, QSO

=== Government ===
The 44th New Zealand Parliament continued. Government was The National Party, led by Jim Bolger. In the 1996 New Zealand general election National was returned to power, but had to form a coalition with the New Zealand First.

- Speaker of the House - Peter Tapsell then Doug Kidd
- Prime Minister - Jim Bolger
- Deputy Prime Minister - Don McKinnon then Winston Peters
- Minister of Finance - Bill Birch
- Minister of Foreign Affairs - Don McKinnon
- Chief Justice — Sir Thomas Eichelbaum

=== Opposition leaders ===
See: Category:Parliament of New Zealand, New Zealand elections

- Act - Roger Douglas then Richard Prebble
- New Zealand First - Winston Peters
- United Future - Peter Dunne
- Labour - Helen Clark (Leader of the Opposition)
- Alliance - Jim Anderton

=== Main centre leaders ===
- Mayor of Auckland - Les Mills
- Mayor of Hamilton - Margaret Evans
- Mayor of Wellington - Mark Blumsky
- Mayor of Christchurch - Vicki Buck
- Mayor of Dunedin - Sukhi Turner

== Events ==
- April: The New Zealand Tablet winds up. The weekly Catholic newspaper started publication in 1873.
- 1 November: Cartoon Network debuts on New Zealand television.
- November: Michael Jackson, the king of pop, performed in Auckland both nights (November 9 and November 11), as a part of his world tour, HIStory World Tour.
- Leaded petrol is phased out.

== Arts and literature ==
- Bernadette Hall wins the Robert Burns Fellowship.
- Montana New Zealand Book Awards:
  - Book of the Year/Cultural Heritage: Judith Binney, Redemption Songs - A Life of Te Kooti Arikirangi Te Turuki
  - First Book Awards
    - Fiction: Emily Perkins, Not Her Real Name
    - Poetry: James Brown, Go Round Power Please
    - Non-Fiction: Alex Frame, Salmond: Southern Jurist
- f*INK, Dunedin's weekly entertainment magazine is founded

See 1996 in art, 1996 in literature, Category:1996 books

=== Music ===
==== New Zealand Music Awards ====
Winners are shown first with nominees underneath.

- Album of the Year: Shihad - Killjoy
  - Finn Brothers - Finn
  - Howard Morrison - Songs of New Zealand
  - Max Lines - Beautiful Panflute I
  - Starlight String Quartet - Romantic Strings
  - Suzanne Prentice - 25th Anniversary
- Single of the Year: OMC – How Bizarre
  - D-Faction - Down in the Boondocks
  - Herbs - French Letter '95
  - Jan Hellriegel - Manic
  - The Exponents - La La Lulu
  - Strawpeople - Sweet Disorder
- Best Male Vocalist: Jon Toogood – Shihad
  - Greg Johnson
  - Dave Dobbyn
- Best Female Vocalist: Teremoana Rapley
  - Sulata
  - Jan Hellriegel
- Best Group: Shihad
  - The Exponents
  - The Mutton Birds
  - Finn Brothers
- Rising Star Award: Kylie Harris
  - Bic Runga
  - Glen Moffatt
- Most Promising Male Vocalist: Paul Fuemana (OMC)
  - Jeremy Eade (Garageland)
  - Otis Frizzell (Joint Force)
- Most Promising Female Vocalist: Bic Runga
  - Celia Mancini (King Loser)
  - Jordan Reyne
- Most Promising Group: OMC
  - Garageland
  - Joint Force
- International Achievement: Shihad
  - Finn Brothers
  - Dave Dobbyn
  - Supergroove
- Best Video: Sigi Spath / Jo Fisher – You Gotta Know (Supergroove)
  - Greg Page - Honeyblonde (Throw)
  - M Noonan and J Frizzell - Static PTI (Joint Force)
- Best Producer: Eddie Rayner - World Stand Still
  - Alan Jansson, Nathan Haines and James Pinker - Shift Left (Nathan Haines)
  - Malcolm Welsford - La La Lulu (The Exponents)
- Best Engineer: Alan Jansson – How Bizarre (Omc)
  - Chris Sinclair - Black Sand Shore (Grace)
  - Malcolm Welsford - La La Lulu (The Exponents)
- Best Jazz Album: Nathan Haines – Shift Left
  - Hattie St John - Flying High at Iguacu
  - Christchurch Polytechnic Sextet - Collaboration
- Best Classical Album: Michael Houston - Beethoven Piano Sonatas from the Middle Period
  - Alexander Ivashkin and Tamas Vesmas - Alfred Schnittke
  - L Subramaniam - Pacific Rendezvous
- Best Country Album: Kylie Harris – Let It Be Love
  - Glen Moffatt - Somewhere in New Zealand Tonight
  - Kevin Greaves - Over the Storm
- Best Folk Album: Rua – Harbour Lights
  - Chris Thompson - Song for Laura
  - Peter Skandera and Dave Maybee - Acoustic Spirit
- Best Gospel Album: Brent Chambers – Living Sacrifices
  - Alastair Brown - Narrow
  - Paul Stephens - Apocalypse
- Best Mana Maori Album: Southside of Bombay with Mina Ripia – Kia Mau
  - Maree Sheehan - Past to Present
  - Moana and The Moahunters - Give it Up Now
  - Ruia - Ka Tangi te Tiitii Ka Tangi to Kaakaa
- Best Mana Reo Album: Southside of Bombay with Mina Ripia – Kia Mau
  - Ruia - Ka Tangi te Tiitii Ka Tangi te Kaakaa
  - Moana and the Moahunters - Akona Te Reo '95
- Best Children's Album: Nga Pihi - 1 & 2
  - Radha and the Kiwis - Sing the World Around
  - Kids TV - You and Me Songbook (Suzy Cato)
- Best Polynesian Album: Southside of Bombay - Umbadada
  - D-Faction - Down in the Boondocks
  - John Akaata - Ura Mai Koe
  - Purest Form - If I Fell/U Can Do It
- Best Songwriter: Mark Tierney / Paul Casserly / Anthony Ioasa - Sweet Disorder (Strawpeople)
  - Glen Moffatt - Somewhere in New Zealand Tonight
  - Greg Johnson - Don't Wait Another Day
- Best Cover: Alec Bathgate – Abbasalutely
  - Chris Knox - Songs of You and Me
  - Neil Finn and Wayne Conway - Finn

See: 1996 in music

=== Performing arts ===
- Benny Award presented by the Variety Artists Club of New Zealand to Keith Leggett.

=== Radio and television ===
See: 1996 in New Zealand television, 1996 in television, List of TVNZ television programming, TV3 (New Zealand), Public broadcasting in New Zealand

- The New Zealand Government sells the Radio New Zealand commercial arm to Clear Channel creating The Radio Network

=== Film ===
- Broken English
- Chicken
- Jack Brown Genius
- Flight of the Albatross
- Someone Else's Country
- The Frighteners
- The Whole of the Moon

See: Category:1996 film awards, 1996 in film, List of New Zealand feature films, Cinema of New Zealand, Category:1996 films

=== Internet ===
See: NZ Internet History

== Sport ==
=== Athletics ===
- Phil Costley wins his first national title in the men's marathon, clocking 2:20:32 on 27 October in Auckland, while Tracey Clissold claims her first in the women's championship (2:39:03).

=== Basketball ===
- The NBL was won by Auckland.

=== Cricket ===
Various Tours, New Zealand cricket team, Chappell–Hadlee Trophy, Cricket World Cup

=== Golf ===
- New Zealand Open
- Check Category:New Zealand golfers in overseas tournaments.

=== Horse racing ===
==== Harness racing ====
- New Zealand Trotting Cup: Il Vicolo - 2nd win
- Auckland Trotting Cup: Sharp And Telford

=== Netball ===
- Silver Ferns
- National Bank Cup

=== Olympic Games ===
- New Zealand sends a team of 97 competitors.

Gold	Silver	Bronze	Total
3	2	1	6

=== Paralympics ===
- New Zealand sends a team of 30 competitors across seven sports.

Gold	Silver	Bronze	Total
9	6	3	18

=== Rugby league ===
- The Lion Red Cup was won by the Counties Manukau Heroes who beat the Waitakere City Raiders 34–22 in the grand final. Waitakere were the minor premiers.
- In their second season the Auckland Warriors placed 11th of 20 teams in the Australian National Rugby League competition. They had been in finals contention until losing their last six games.
- 5 October, New Zealand defeated Papua New Guinea 62-8
- 11 October, New Zealand defeated Papua New Guinea 64-0

The 1996 Great Britain Lions tour saw the three Tet matches played in New Zealand:

- 18 October, New Zealand defeated Great Britain 17-12
- 25 October, New Zealand defeated Great Britain 18-15
- 1 November, New Zealand defeated Great Britain 32-12

=== Rugby union ===
Category:Rugby union in New Zealand, Super 14, Rugby World Cup, National Provincial Championship, Category:All Blacks, Bledisloe Cup, Tri Nations Series, Ranfurly Shield

=== Shooting ===
- Ballinger Belt – Graeme Ballinger (Levin)

=== Soccer ===
- The National Summer Soccer League was inaugurated to replace the New Zealand National Soccer League, so there was no 1996 league champion.
- The New Zealand national soccer team placed third in the OFC Nations Cup, which this year was played as a league rather than a tournament.
- The Chatham Cup is won by Waitakere City F.C. who beat Mt Wellington 3–1 in the final.

== Births ==
=== January ===
- 1 January – Ben Lister, cricketer
- 5 January – James Fisher-Harris, rugby league player
- 9 January – Jayden Bezzant, basketball player
- 10 January – Jamie-Lee Price, netballer
- 13 January
  - Mitch Jacobson, rugby union player
  - Oliver Sail, association footballer
- 28 January – Gabby Westbrook-Patrick, model
- 31 January – Jordan Trainor, rugby union player

=== February ===
- 6 February – Rhett Purcell, tennis player
- 7 February – Piera Hudson, alpine skier
- 10 February – Nicole van der Kaay, triathlete
- 11 February – Jack Salt, basketball player
- 14 February – Poasa Faamausili, rugby league player
- 19 February – Amy Robinson, field hockey player
- 28 February – Rosa Flanagan, athlete
- 29 February
  - Nelson Asofa-Solomona, rugby league player
  - Tarryn Davey, field hockey player
  - Claudia Williams, tennis player

=== March ===
- 8 March – Leni Apisai, rugby league player
- 11 March – Matthew Ridenton, association footballer
- 14 March – Andrew Blake, association footballer
- 16 March – Tyrel Lomax, rugby union player
- 20 March – Deklan Wynne, association footballer
- 22 March – Tamupiwa Dimairo, association footballer
- 24 March – Jack Boyle, cricketer
- 26 March – Zane Musgrove, rugby league player

=== April ===
- 3 April – Cory Brown, association footballer
- 14 April – Jessee Wyatt, athlete
- 15 April – Nathaniel Roache, rugby league player
- 20 April – Caleb Makene, rugby union player
- 23 April – Ollie Jones, cyclist
- 29 April – Nicholas Kergozou, cyclist

=== May ===
- 9 May – Jonah Lowe, rugby union player
- 10 May
  - Henry Shipley, cricketer
  - Taniela Tupou, rugby league player
- 12 May – Hugh Renton, rugby union player
- 23 May – Maddison Keeney, diver
- 27 May – Sio Tomkinson, rugby union player
- 29 May – Holly Rose Emery, model
- 31 May – Brandon Smith, rugby league player

=== June ===
- 1 June – Adam Mitchell, association footballer
- 4 June – Meikayla Moore, association footballer
- 5 June
  - Gayle Broughton, rugby union player
  - Jamayne Isaako, rugby league player
- 6 June – Ofahiki Ogden, rugby league player
- 7 June – Jackie Gowler, rower
- 10 June – TJ Va'a, rugby union player
- 12 June
  - Luke Mudgway, cyclist
  - Alex Rufer, association footballer
- 18 June – Sam Nock, rugby union player
- 29 June
  - Joseph Manu, rugby league player
  - Mikayla Pirini, basketball player
- 30 June – Louisa Tuilotolava, field hockey player

=== July ===
- 1 July – Lauchie Johns, cricketer
- 3 July – Aidan Sarikaya, field hockey player
- 5 July – Alex Ridley, cricketer
- 11 July – David Liti, weightlifter
- 16 July – Josh Iosefa-Scott, rugby union player
- 20 July – Jasmine Pereira, association footballer
- 26 July – Jamie Curry, vlogger, comedian
- 27 July – Luther Hirini, rugby union player
- 29 July – Marata Niukore, rugby league player

=== August ===
- 16 August – Sefo Kautai, rugby union player
- 17 August
  - Hamish Kerr, high jumper
  - Esan Marsters, rugby league player
- 20 August – Bunty Afoa, rugby league player
- 21 August – Quinten Strange, rugby union player

=== September ===
- 5 September – Isaac Salmon, rugby union player
- 6 September – Nicholas Reddish, cyclist
- 12 September
  - Aaron Booth, decathlete
  - Ryan Christensen, cyclist
  - Pari Pari Parkinson, rugby union player
- 13 September – Botille Vette-Welsh, rugby league player
- 19 September – Lukhan Salakaia-Loto, rugby union player
- 25 September – Salesi Rayasi, rugby union player
- 29 September – Jahrome Brown, rugby union player

=== October ===
- 2 October
  - Tayler Reid, triathlete
  - Michaela Sokolich-Beatson, netball player
- 3 October – Hannah Rowe, cricketer
- 4 October – Brett Cameron, rugby union player
- 5 October
  - Lisati Milo-Harris, rugby union player
  - Jayden Nikorima, rugby league player
- 6 October
  - Regan Gough, cyclist
  - Elizabeth Ross, rower
- 9 October – Eliza Grigg, alpine skier
- 18 October – Frances Davies, field hockey player
- 22 October – Kelly Jury, netball player
- 24 October – Ayden Johnstone, rugby union player
- 25 October – Alex Nankivell, rugby union player

=== November ===
- 2 November – Andre de Jong, association footballer
- 4 November – Jana Radosavljević, association footballer
- 7 November
  - Hades, Thoroughbred racehorse
  - Ella Yelich-O'Connor (aka Lorde), singer-songwriter
- 10 November – Emma Rolston, association footballer
- 14 November – Shaun Stevenson, rugby union player
- 15 November – Georgia Marris, swimmer

=== December ===
- 5 December – Holly Edmondston, cyclist
- 6 December
  - Glenn Phillips, cricketer
  - Mark Tele'a, rugby union player
- 8 December – Josh Finnie, cricketer
- 9 December – Monty Patterson, association footballer
- 11 December – Eliza McCartney, pole vaulter
- 23 December – Nik Tzanev, association footballer
- 24 December – Richard Kam, ice dancer
- 28 December – Fin Hoeata, rugby union player
- 29 December – Emma Rainey, field hockey player
- 30 December – Brad Abbey, rugby league player

== Deaths ==
=== January–March ===
- 4 January – Jim Robertson, historian (born 1896)
- 6 January – Beeban McKnight, entertainer, cinema operator, community leader (born 1897)
- 9 January – Herbert Money, evangelical missionary (born 1899)
- 17 January – Arnold Anderson, athlete (born 1912)
- 30 January – Guy Doleman, actor (born 1923)
- 31 January – Sir Peter Tait, politician (born 1915)
- 24 February – Graeme Moran, rower (born 1938)
- 26 February – Don Oliver, weightlifter, fitness entrepreneur (born 1937)
- 4 March − John Spencer, yacht designer (born 1931)
- 9 March – Harold Baigent, actor (born 1916)

=== April–June ===
- 16 April – Archie Dunningham, librarian (born 1907)
- 17 April – Robbie Robson, lawn bowls player (born 1918)
- 21 April – Paraone Reweti, politician (born 1916)
- 26 April – Terence Vaughan, musician, performing arts administrator (born 1915)
- 1 May – Bruce McLeod, rugby union player (born 1940)
- 10 May – Ronald Bush, rugby union player and coach, cricketer (born 1909)
- 11 May – Rob Hall, mountaineer (born 1961)
- 16 May – Robert Hurst, nuclear scientist (born 1915)
- 22 May – Jack George, politician (born 1901)
- 26 May – Vince Bevan, rugby union player (born 1921)
- 30 May – Balmerino, thoroughbred racehorse (foaled 1972)
- 31 May – Robert Holden, motorcycle racer (born 1958)
- 1 June – Jack Hemi, rugby union and rugby league player (born 1914)
- 2 June – Freda Bream, writer (born 1918)
- 3 June – Ben Couch, rugby union player, politician (born 1925)
- 5 June – Ian Grey, historian (born 1918)
- 7 June – Tom Puna, cricketer (born 1929)
- 9 June – Leo Schultz, politician (born 1914)
- 16 June – Richard Sylvan, philosopher (born 1935)
- 17 June – Doug Harris, athlete (born 1919)
- 18 June – Florence Andrews, fencer (born 1912)
- 19 June – Eric Fisher, cricketer (born 1924)
- 20 June – Colin Gillies, rugby union player (born 1912)

=== July–September ===
- 3 July – Barry Crump, author (born 1935)
- 11 July – Bob Whaitiri, community leader (born 1916)
- 17 July – Nell Rose, nurse (born 1996)
- 19 July – Jack Clarke, athlete (born 1919)
- 25 July – Andy Keyworth, master mariner (born 1923)
- 10 August – Les George, rugby union player and administrator (born 1908)
- 16 August – Lena Manuel, community leader (born 1915)
- 27 August – Josie Yelas, netball player (born 1924)
- 10 September – Patrick Rhind, rugby union player (born 1915)
- 13 September – Dot Simons, sports journalist and writer (born 1912)
- 23 September – Sir Jack Newman, cricketer, businessman (born 1902)
- 26 September – Athol Rafter, nuclear chemist (born 1913)

=== October–December ===
- 1 October
  - James Beal, boxer (born 1929)
  - Patrick Jameson, World War II flying ace (born 1912)
- 10 October – Harold Cleghorn, weightlifter (born 1912)
- 12 October – Fred Miller, journalist, historian (born 1904)
- 22 October – Noel Hilliard, author and novelist (born 1929)
- 24 October – Robert Anderson, politician (born 1936)
- 27 October – Piet van Asch, aviator, aerial photographer and surveyor (born 1911)
- 28 October – Jimmy Haig, rugby union and rugby league player (born 1924)
- 5 November – Hugh Sew Hoy, businessman, community leader (born 1901)
- 15 November – Les Watt, cricketer (born 1924)
- 23 November – Eve Rimmer, athlete (born 1937)
- 26 November
  - Dame Joan Hammond, opera singer (born 1912)
  - Te Waari Whaitiri, master mariner, community leader (born 1912)
- 12 December – Elaine Gurr, doctor and medical administrator (born 1896)
- 17 December
  - Lawrie Miller, cricketer (born 1923)
  - Violet Walrond, swimmer (born 1905)
- 22 December – Bert Lunn, rugby union player (born 1926)
- 25 December – Harry Watson, cyclist (born 1904)

== See also ==
- List of years in New Zealand
- Timeline of New Zealand history
- History of New Zealand
- Military history of New Zealand
- Timeline of the New Zealand environment
- Timeline of New Zealand's links with Antarctica
