= Jim Ross (educationalist) =

New Zealand educationalist (1930–2020)

Jim Ross QSO
- Born: James Alexander Ross; 10 June 1930
- Died: 28 June 2020 (aged 90)
- Education: New Plymouth Boys' High School; University of Otago; Canterbury University College
- Occupations: School teacher Public servant

James Alexander Ross QSO (10 June 1930 – 28 June 2020) was a New Zealand educationalist and public servant.

== Biography ==
Born in 1930, Ross was educated at New Plymouth Boys' High School from 1944 to 1948, where he was head boy and vice-captain of the 1st XV rugby union team in his final year. He went on to study geography at the University of Otago and Canterbury University College, graduating Master of Arts with second-class honours in 1955.

Ross also earned a Diploma of Teaching, and became a secondary school teacher. He was senior master at Upper Hutt College for four years until he was appointed as an inspector of secondary schools in 1965. He also co-authored three secondary school textbooks on geography with George Jobberns between 1960 and 1966. In the early 1970s, Ross moved to the Department of Education in Wellington as a public servant. He was the first superintendent of curriculum development, spent nine years as assistant Director General of Education from 1979, and served on the education committee of the OECD. He retired as acting Director General of Education in 1990.

In the 1990 New Year Honours, Ross was appointed a Companion of the Queen's Service Order for public services. He died on 28 June 2020.

== Books ==
- Jobberns, George; Ross, James (1960). Social studies in geography 1: the Pacific world. Christchurch: Whitcombe and Tombs.
- Jobberns, George; Ross, James (1960). Social studies in geography 2: the Atlantic world. Christchurch: Whitcombe and Tombs.
- Jobberns, George; Ross, James (1966). World geography. Christchurch: Whitcombe and Tombs.
