= Sid Scales =

New Zealand cartoonist (1916–2003)

Sid Scales OBE
- Born: Sydney Ernest Scales; 17 July 1916; Ashburton, New Zealand
- Died: 7 March 2003 (aged 86); Motueka, New Zealand
- Education: Canterbury College School of Art; Central School of Art and Design
- Style: Cartoons
- Military career
- Allegiance: New Zealand
- Service: Royal New Zealand Air Force
- Service years: 1940–1946
- Rank: Flight lieutenant
- Wars / battles: World War II; South-East Asian theatre
- Awards: 1939–1945 Star; Pacific Star; Defence Medal; War Medal 1939–1945; New Zealand War Service Medal

Sydney Ernest Scales OBE (17 July 1916 – 7 March 2003) was a New Zealand cartoonist who, after being a prisoner of war in Java during World War II, worked for the Otago Daily Times for 30 years.

== Biography ==
Born in Ashburton, New Zealand, Scales worked as a reporter at the Timaru Herald in the 1930s and published cartoons there and in other newspapers between 1934 and 1938. With war impending, he trained as a pilot and was commissioned in the Royal New Zealand Air Force as a flight lieutenant in 1940, and then seconded to the Royal Air Force. He served in World War II as a Catalina seaplane around Singapore and Malaya. On 25 December 1941, his plane was shot down into the Gulf of Siam, and the crew spent 9 hours in the water and 10 in a dinghy before being rescued.

A self-portrait

When the Japanese overran Singapore, he was relocated to Java until that too was occupied and he became a prisoner of war (POW). Scales was a prisoner of the Japanese in Java for three and a half years, until being liberated at the end of the war. While in camp Scales showed his talent as a caricaturist by contributing to an in-camp newspaper called Mark Time. Some of these 'Campicatures' were buried and saved by returning POWs at the end of the war and found their way to the Imperial War Museum in London and the Alexander Turnbull Library. While being held as a POW, Scales also managed to escape from prison camp and, along with some fellow-escapees, designed and began building a boat with the intention of sailing to Australia. The Japanese waited until the band of men were low with dysentery before coming to pick them up and take them back to prison camp.

Immediately after the war, Scales studied art at the Canterbury School of Art (now the Ilam School of Fine Arts), then moved to London in 1947 to study at the Central School of Art and Design. He returned to New Zealand to work as a commercial artist before being employed by the Otago Daily Times as a staff cartoonist from 1951 until his retirement in 1981. Over the course of his career his newspaper cartoons, which ranged from geopolitics to lampooning New Zealand politicians to domestic humour, were regularly compiled into print collections. Scales was appointed an Officer of the Order of the British Empire in the 1983 New Year Honours, for service as a cartoonist. He died in Motueka on 7 March 2003.
