= Elspeth Kennedy (sharebroker) =

New Zealand sharebroker

Elspeth Kennedy QSO MBE
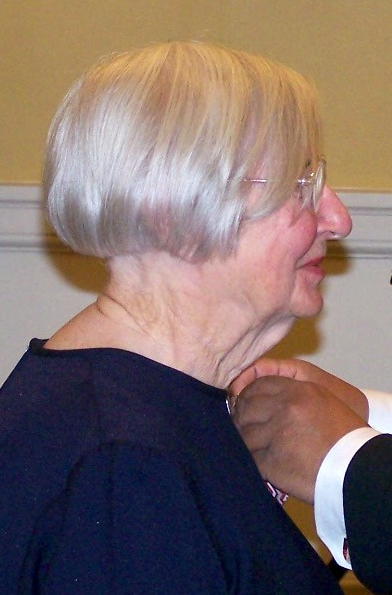
- Kennedy in 2009
- Born: Elsie Cantlie Myron; 3 April 1931; Invercargill, New Zealand
- Died: 8 January 2017 (aged 85); Nelson, New Zealand
- Occupation: Sharebroker
- Known for: Kennedy Sharebrokers

Elspeth Cantlie Kennedy QSO MBE (born Elsie Cantlie Myron; 3 April 1931 – 8 January 2017) was a New Zealand sharebroker and community leader. She was the first woman in New Zealand to be elected as a member of a metropolitan stock exchange, and the first to run her own broking firm. Kennedy chaired the Nelson Tasman Hospice Trust from 1998 to 2014.

== Early life and family ==
Born in Invercargill on 3 April 1931 as Elsie Cantlie Myron, she was educated at Southland Girls' High School. She showed early business acumen, running her grandfather's coal retailing business when she was just 17 years old, and then worked at the Invercargill City Council where she became credit manager at the age of 20 years. In 1952 Kennedy went to Britain to study singing, qualifying as a Fellow of Trinity College London. Returning to New Zealand, Kennedy later settled in Nelson in the 1970s, where she taught at the Nelson School of Music.

She married James Kennedy-Simpson. The couple had three children but later divorced.

== Sharebroking career ==
In 1979, Kennedy was employed by Frank Renouf as the local-body specialist at his Wellington sharebroking firm, and three years later she became the first woman in New Zealand to become a member of a metropolitan stock exchange when she was elected to the Wellington Exchange. Kennedy joined Francis Allison Symes in 1984, establishing that firm's local authority money market. She was the first New Zealand woman, in January 1987, to establish her own brokerage firm, Kennedy Sharebrokers, which merged with Main Corporation later that year.

== Later business activities ==
After resigning as chair of Main Corporation in December 1987, Kennedy was involved in setting up the Government Computer Service, of which she was a director until 1993. She also served as deputy chair of the Nelson Bays Business Development Board, chair of the South Island Promotion Association, and a director of various companies including Mount Cook Group.

== Community service ==
Kennedy became a trustee of the Nelson Tasman Hospice Trust in 1998, and served as chair of that organisation from 1998 until 2014. She was instrumental in the establishment of the Nelson Hospice in 1999.

== Honours and awards ==
In the 1990 New Year Honours, Kennedy was appointed a Member of the Order of the British Empire, for services to tourism. Also in 1990 she received the New Zealand 1990 Commemoration Medal. She was appointed a Companion of the Queen's Service Order for services to the community in the 2009 New Year Honours.

In 2003, Kennedy was named Nelsonian of the Year by the Nelson Mail newspaper. She was posthumously inducted into the New Zealand Business Hall of Fame in 2018.

== Death ==
Kennedy died in Nelson on 8 January 2017.
