= 1981 Birthday Honours (New Zealand) =

Awards list for New Zealand

The 1981 Queen's Birthday Honours in New Zealand, celebrating the official birthday of Elizabeth II, were appointments made by the Queen in her right as Queen of New Zealand, on the advice of the New Zealand government, to various orders and honours to reward and highlight good works by New Zealanders. They were announced on 13 June 1981.

The recipients of honours are displayed here as they were styled before their new honour.

== Knight Bachelor ==
- (Edward) Michael Coulson Fowler – of Wellington; mayor of the City of Wellington.
- (Frederick Reed) Alan Hellaby – of Auckland. For services to the meat industry and community.
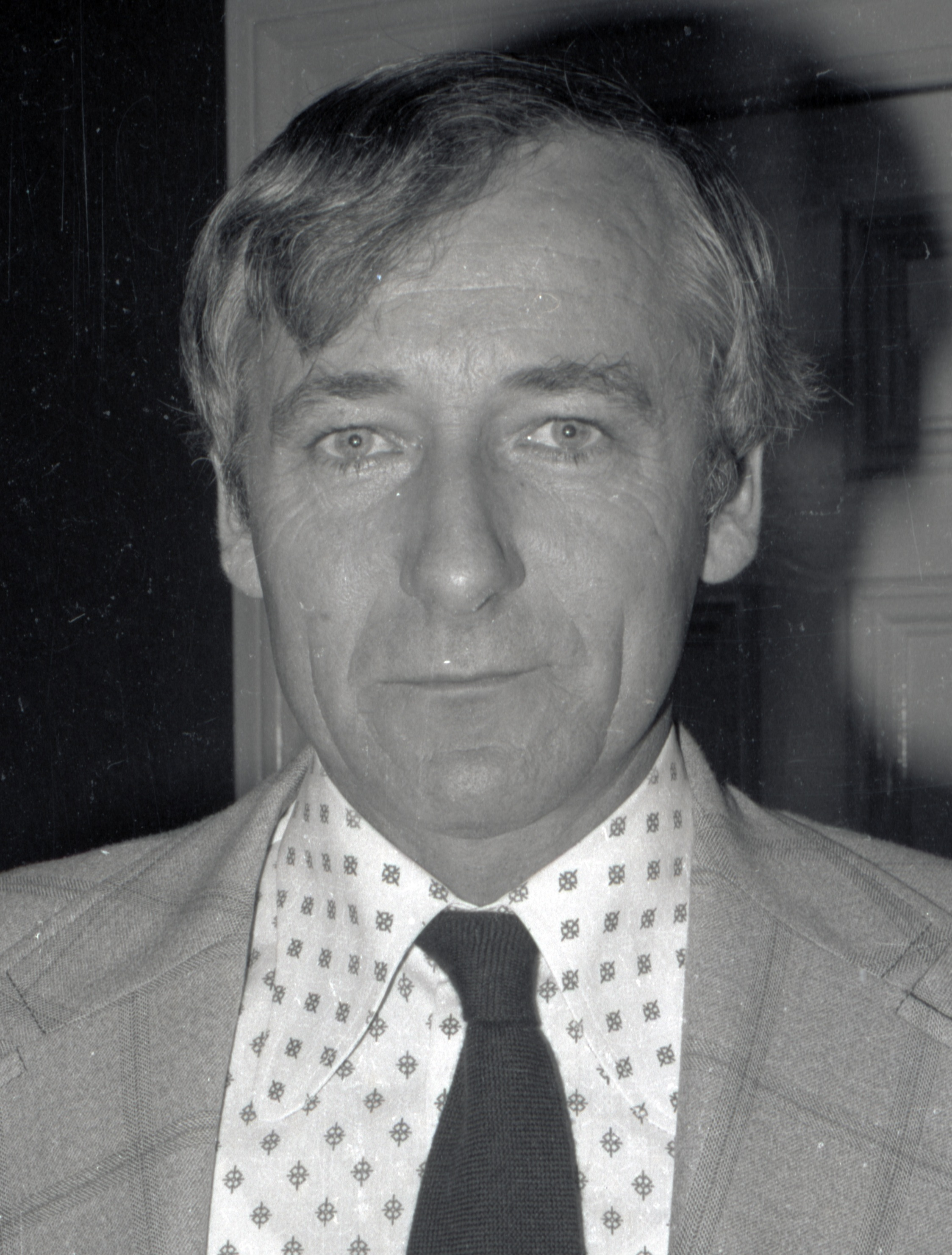
Sir Michael Fowler

== Order of the Bath ==
=== Companion (CB) ===
Civil division

- Dr Robert Martin Williams CBE – of Wellington; lately chairman of the State Services Commission.

== Order of Saint Michael and Saint George ==
=== Companion (CMG) ===
- The Right Reverend Manu Augustus Bennett – of Te Puke; lately Bishop of Aotearoa.
- Albert Eaton Hurley – of Auckland; parliamentary commissioner for investigation (ombudsman), 1976–1980.
- Norman Colin McLeod – of Wellington; Commissioner of Works since 1973.

== Order of the British Empire ==
=== Knight Commander (KBE) ===
Civil division

- Dr Alan Stewart CBE – of Palmerston North; vice-chancellor of Massey University since 1964.
- The Right Honourable Sir (Arthur) Owen Woodhouse DSC – of Wellington; president of the Court of Appeal.
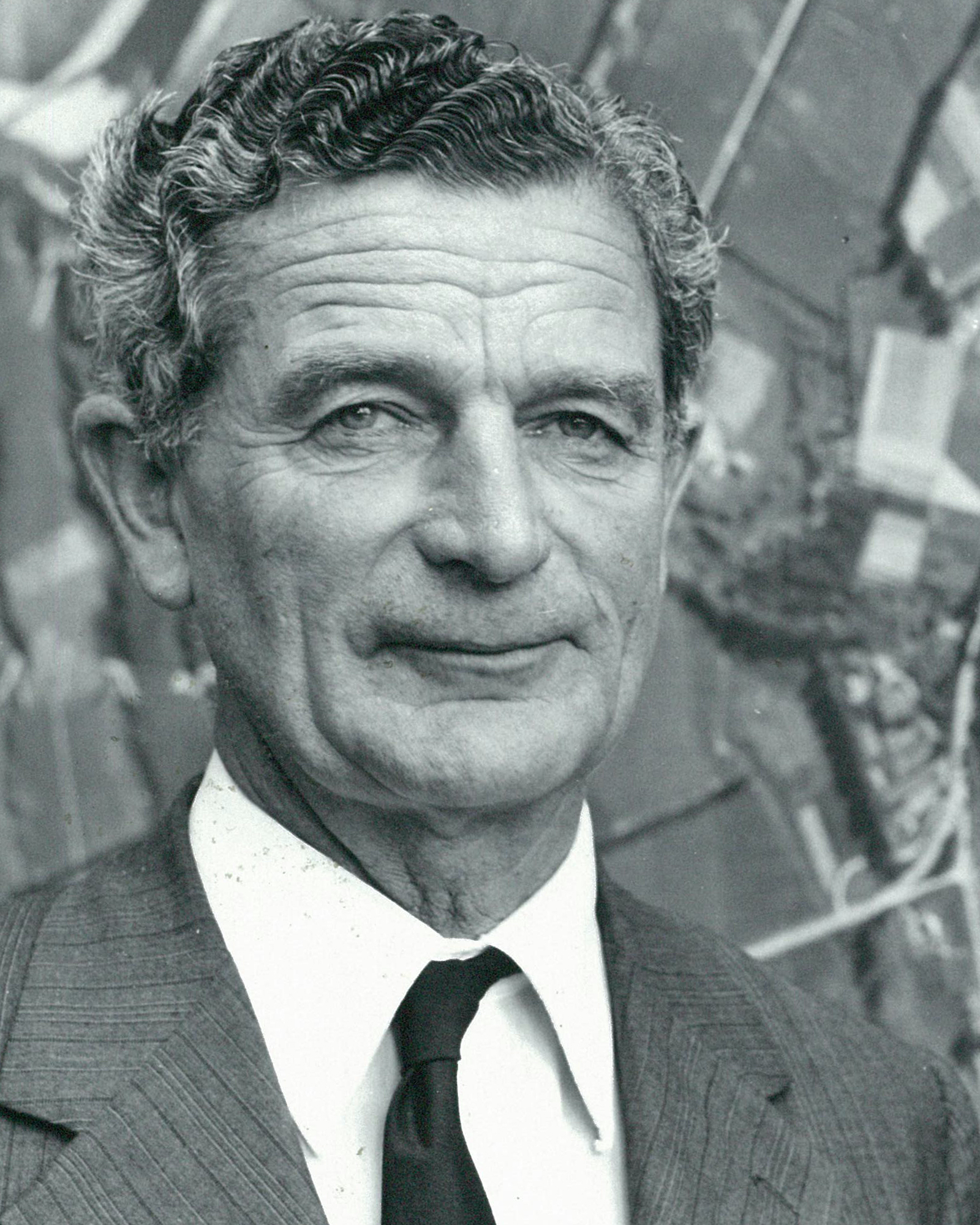
Sir Alan Stewart

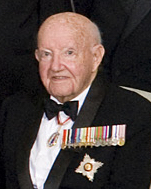
Sir Owen Woodhouse

=== Commander (CBE) ===
Civil division

- Mervyn Miles Nelson Corner OBE MC JP – of Auckland. For services to the New Zealand fishing industry and community.
- Dr David Russell Hay – of Christchurch. For services to the New Zealand Heart Foundation.
- John Brownlow Horrocks MC ED – of Auckland. For services to business management and the community.
- John Desmond Rose ED – of Singapore, formerly of Auckland. For services to commerce and the community.
- Emeritus Professor John Tenison Salmon FRSNZ – of Waikanae. For services to conservation.
- Denis Vaughan Sutherland JP – of New Plymouth. For services to the City of New Plymouth.

Military division

- Commodore Eric Robinson Ellison OBE – Royal New Zealand Navy.
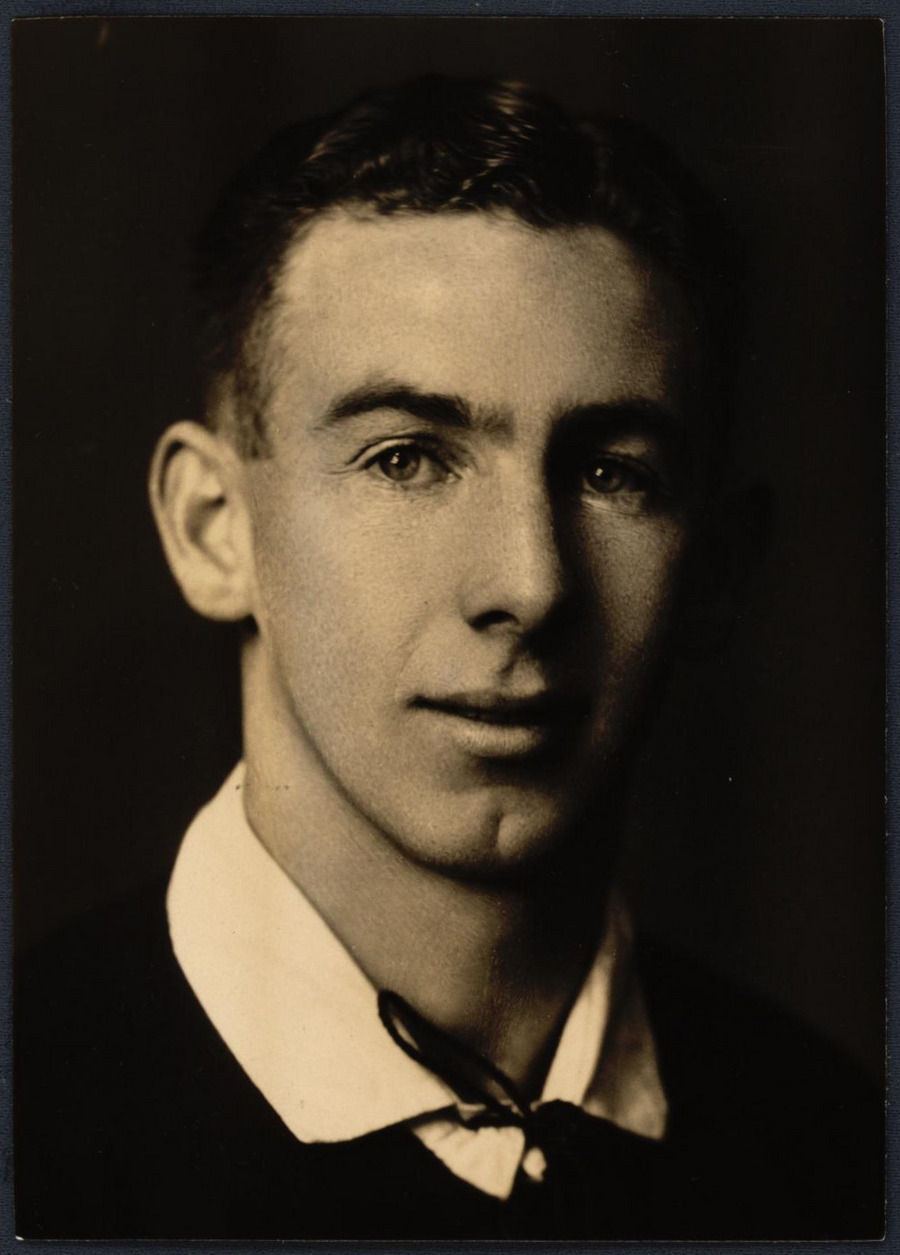
Merv Corner

=== Officer (OBE) ===
Civil division

- Patrick John Booth – of Auckland. For services to journalism.
- (John) Brian Brake – of Auckland. For services to photography.
- Noel Stewart Coad – of Wellington; lately Director-General of Lands.
- Bryan William Gibson – assistant commissioner, New Zealand Police.
- Henry Patrick Glen – of Blenheim. For services to Heritage Incorporated and the community.
- Winifred Mary Goddard – of Lower Hutt. For services to the dietetic profession.
- Claude Walter Green ED – of Rahotu. For services to the Taranaki Harbour Board, farming and the community.
- Jon Oliver Feilden Hamilton – of Christchurch. For services to engineering.
- Athol Sydney George McGeady – of Greymouth. For services to farming.
- Noel Victor Mangin – of Hamburg, Federal Republic of Germany. For services to opera.
- Professor Eric Musard Nanson – of Auckland. For services to medicine.
- John Joseph O'Dea – of Dunedin. For services to the community.
- Donald Carthew Oliver – of Auckland. For services to weightlifting and the community.
- Jack Boland Rolfe JP – of Putāruru. For services to the community.
- Hugh Sew Hoy – of Dunedin. For services to export and the community.
- John McCoubrie Stewart – of Wanganui. For services to veterinary science.
- William Arthur Harold Thompson – of Invercargill. For services to Thoroughbred breeding, racing and the community.
- Eric William Thomas Tindill – of Wellington. For services to rugby and cricket.
- Dr Donald William Urquhart – of Palmerston North. For services to medicine, especially radiology.
- Harold Jeffery Whitwell – of Palmerston North; lately principal, Palmerston North Teachers' College.

Military division

- Captain Geoffrey Frank Hopkins – Royal New Zealand Navy.
- Colonel Robert Angus Burns ED – Colonels' List, New Zealand Army (Territorial Force).
- Group Captain Graeme Bernard Gilmore – Royal New Zealand Air Force.
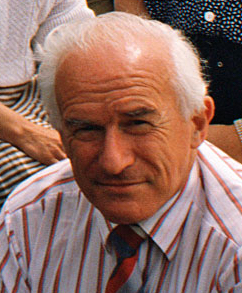
Pat Booth

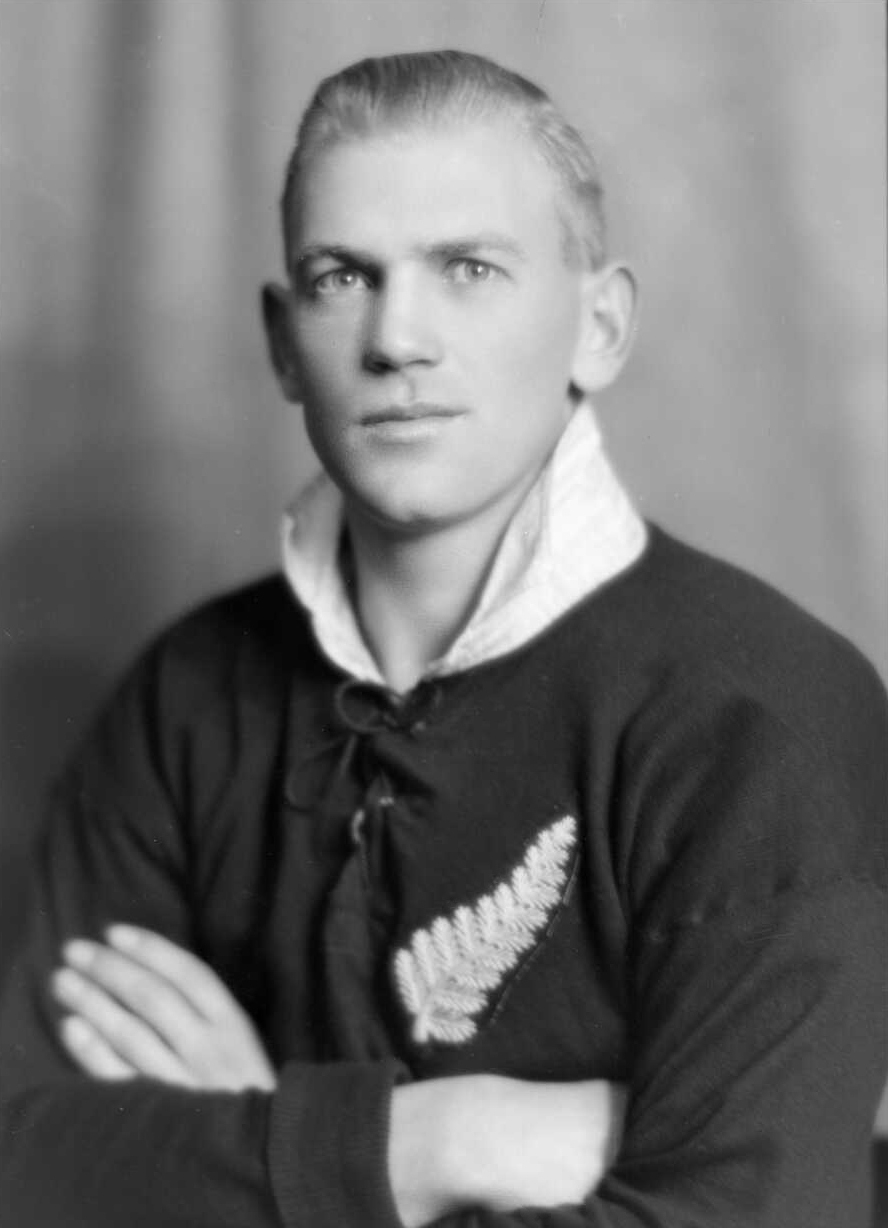
Eric Tindill

=== Member (MBE) ===
Civil division

- Rowland Newton Angrove – of Napier. For services to the disabled and the community.
- George Easton Barber – of Foxton. For services to education and the community.
- Barbara Isobel Louise Basham JP – of Wellington. For services to broadcasting and the community.
- Clifford Halley Benson – of Auckland. For services to the handicapped and education.
- Edward Henry Raymond Boyd – of Levin. For services to the welfare of returned servicemen and the community.
- Donald William Cimino – of Wanganui. For services to the Wanganui Museum and the community.
- Joyce Isabel Clarke – of Pleasant Point. For services to the community.
- Robert Maurice Conly AE – of Christchurch. For services to art.
- Lieutenant Commander William George Costello – of Christchurch; New Zealand Cadet Forces.
- Jane Labatt Crosse – of Patoka. For services to the New Zealand Red Cross Society.
- Enid Joan Durbin – of Auckland. For services to netball.
- Alexander Edwards JP – of Cromwell. For services to the community.
- Geoffrey Philip Howarth – of London, formerly of Tauranga. For services to cricket.
- Frederick Stanley Hutchings JP – of Rotorua. For services to the dairy industry.
- Helen Agnes Jackman – of Auckland. For services to the Māori people and education.
- Patricia Frances McKelvey – of Wellington. For services to women's cricket.
- Graham Neil Kenneth Mourie – of Ōpunake. For services to rugby.
- Anthony Audrey St Clair Murray Murray-Oliver – of Wellington. For services to the Alexander Turnbull Library and art history.
- Brian Patrick Quinn – of Alexandra. For services to shearing.
- William Eaton Roberts JP – of Ōtorohanga. For services to the community.
- George Colin Spratt – of Te Puke. For services to horticulture.
- Dr Alan Samual Turner – of Napier; physician-in-charge, chest clinic, Napier Hospital.
- Elisabeth Marjorie Urquhart – of Rotorua. For services to the law and community.
- John Gardiner Woolf – of Wairoa. For services to local-body and community affairs.

Military division

- Warrant Officer Stores Accountant Alan Thomas Johnson – Royal New Zealand Navy.
- Warrant Officer Seaman Ronald Arthur Francis Owen – Royal New Zealand Navy.
- Warrant Officer Class I Robin John Church – Royal New Zealand Provost Corps.
- Major Frederick Lang Dennerly – Royal New Zealand Corps of Signals.
- Major Peter Lawrence Holes – Royal New Zealand Infantry Regiment.
- Squadron Leader Sydney Marcus Elliott – Royal New Zealand Air Force.
- Flight Lieutenant Gavin Robert Leckner – Royal New Zealand Air Force.
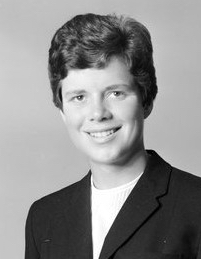
Trish McKelvey

== British Empire Medal (BEM) ==
Military division

- Temporary Sergeant James Edward Bolton – Royal New Zealand Infantry Regiment (Territorial Force).
- Sergeant Rex Charles Johnson – Royal New Zealand Corps of Signals (Territorial Force).
- Staff Sergeant Lance Gordon King – Royal New Zealand Corps of Transport.
- Corporal Tere William Kururangi – Royal New Zealand Army Ordnance Corps.
- Sergeant Robin John Allan – Royal New Zealand Air Force.
- Sergeant Donald John Ashton – Royal New Zealand Air Force.
- Sergeant Rodney Eric Lush – Royal New Zealand Air Force.

== Companion of the Queen's Service Order (QSO) ==
=== For community service ===
- John Francis Gallagher – of Wellington; lieutenant colonel, Salvation Army.
- Allan David Dick – of Waianakarua.
- Barbara Goodman – of Auckland.
- Harold Victor Haines – of Wellington.
- Hugh McKerrell JP – of Hastings.
- James Rafferty – of Leithfield Beach.
- Nora Nellie Steed – of Gisborne.
- Harold Lane Thomas – of Hamilton.
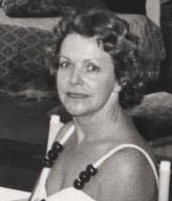
Barbara Goodman

=== For public services ===
- Herbert James Bowkett Coe – of Wellington.
- George Gee JP – of Petone.
- James Ernest Greenslade – of Palmerston North.
- William Herewini JP – of Porirua.
- Thomas McCristell MBE JP – of Balclutha.
- John Lyle Noakes MBE JP – of Tapu.
- Ronald Francis Taylor – of Auckland.

== Queen's Service Medal ==
=== For community service ===
- Muriel Rhoda Barber – of Wellington.
- Zylpha May Bennett – of Timaru.
- Winefride Marie Blake (Sister Mary Winefride) – of Wellington.
- Colin Campbell – of Rangiora.
- Dorothy Christian Gordon Cook – of Tauranga.
- Hazel Daphne Dawson – of Taradale.
- Letitia Joan Douglas – of Invercargill.
- Mingao Noho Whane Edwards – of Maungatapere.
- Leonard Edward Frances – of Masterton.
- Irene Mary Gordon – of Wellington.
- Alexander John William Grant JP – of Taupō; brigadier, Salvation Army.
- Florence Marie Harsant – of Hahei.
- Manatenoki Sally Karena – of Ōpunake.
- Mary Edith Evelyn Knight (Mrs Painter) – of Auckland.
- Odette Vivienne Leather – of Auckland.
- Marjorie Mary Maddren – of Whangārei.
- May Elizabeth Marriott – of Timaru.
- Isaac Frank Miller – of Belfast.
- James Nicholas – of Brixton, Waitara.
- Victor John Carruthers Nicholson JP – of Palmerston North.
- Wendy McGowan Northcroft – of Hokitika.
- Ivy Nora Norton – of Kaiaua.
- Irene Angola Oliver – of Rotorua.
- Morris James William Paulger – of Christchurch.
- George Arthur Pinckney – of Dannevirke.
- Hannah Maud Sheila Wilder Sherratt – of Puketapu.
- Henare Tuwhangai – of Kihikihi.

=== For public services ===
- Colleen Elizabeth Beaton – of Otira.
- Mabel Bridge – of Rawene.
- Pauline Dorothy Collins – of Christchurch.
- Elizabeth Sandison Daly – postmistress; Claris, Great Barrier Island.
- Hugh Graham Endicott-Davies – senior constable, New Zealand Police.
- Lawrence Cecil Gabites – sergeant, New Zealand Police.
- Frederick Arthur Hitchener – of Wairoa.
- Minnie Te Miri Kamo – of Waikuku Beach; lately public health nurse, Department of Health.
- Sylvia Theresa Kenny JP – of Picton.
- Hugh Francis Malcolm Logan – of Wellington.
- Dr Ronald Diarmid MacDiarmid – of Port Chalmers.
- Colin Chalmers Monteath – of Christchurch.
- Arthur Stewart Ombler JP – of Milton.
- Dawn Rosemary Petersen – of Auckland.
- Joseph Herbert Hugh Pierce MBE ED JP – of Mount Maunganui.
- Naomi Rickard JP – of Ashburton.
- Alois Schicker JP – of Ōkato.
- Alice May Stuart – of Otaitai Bush, Riverton.
- The Reverend Robert Beaumont Tait – of Dunedin.
- Mitchell Daniel Tupari Walters JP – of Dargaville.
- Elsie Irene Wiley – of Masterton.
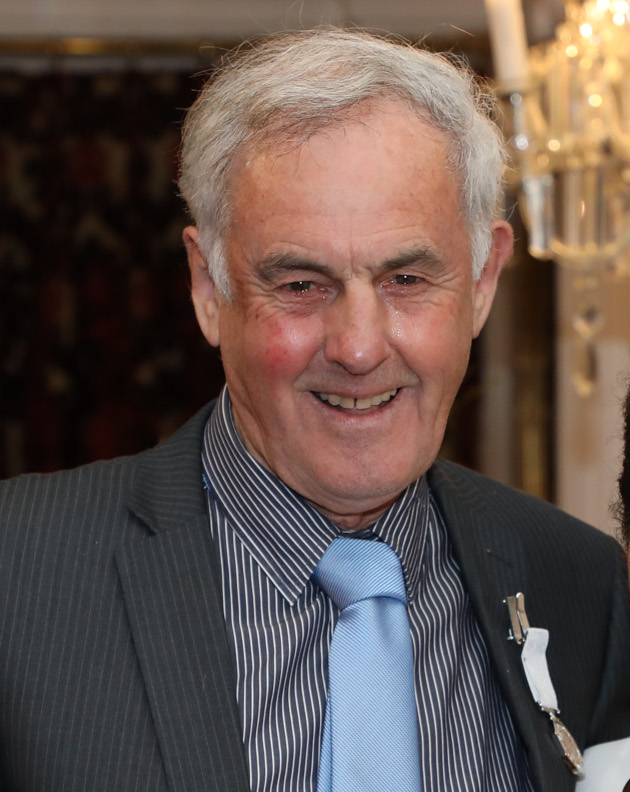
Colin Monteath

== Royal Red Cross ==
=== Member (RRC) ===
- Lieutenant Colonel Helen Judith Macann ARRC – Royal New Zealand Nursing Corps.

== Queen's Fire Service Medal (QFSM) ==
- Clement Augustus Cornes – lately chief fire officer, Te Aroha Volunteer Fire Brigade, New Zealand Fire Service.
- Philip Hori Douché JP – fire force commander, Region 3, New Zealand Fire Service, Palmeston North.
- Graham Charles Howey JP – chief fire officer, Pleasant Point Volunteer Fire Brigade, New Zealand Fire Service.

== Queen's Police Medal (QPM) ==
- Edward John Trappitt MBE – assistant commissioner, New Zealand Police.
