= 1983 New Year Honours (New Zealand) =

Awards list for New Zealand

The 1983 New Year Honours in New Zealand were appointments by Elizabeth II on the advice of the New Zealand government to various orders and honours to reward and highlight good works by New Zealanders. The awards celebrated the passing of 1982 and the beginning of 1983, and were announced on 31 December 1982.

The recipients of honours are displayed here as they were styled before their new honour.

== Knight Bachelor ==
- Russell Hilton Pettigrew – of Napier. For services to the transport industry.
- The Honourable Graham Davies Speight – of Auckland; judge of the High Court of New Zealand, 1966–1982.
- James Douglas Stewart – of Christchurch; principal of Lincoln College, University College of Agriculture. For services to agriculture.
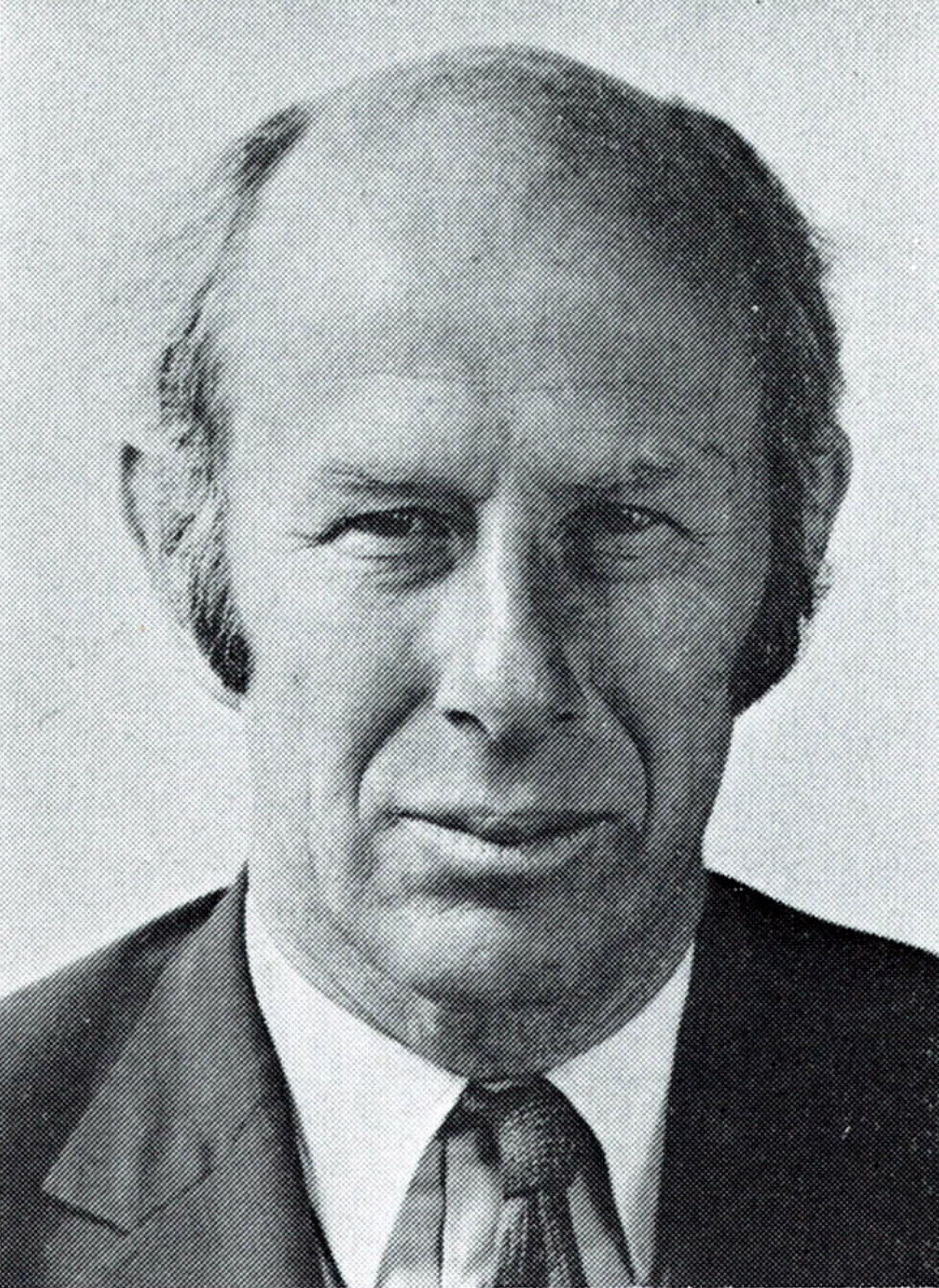
Sir James Stewart

== Order of the Bath ==
=== Companion (CB) ===
Military division

- Major General Robin Guy Williams MBE – Chief of General Staff.

== Order of Saint Michael and Saint George ==
=== Companion (CMG) ===
- Kenneth Frederick Mehrtens – of New Plymouth; lately chairman, New Zealand Dairy Board.
- The Honourable Herbert John Walker JP – of Christchurch. For public and community service.

== Order of the British Empire ==
=== Knight Commander (KBE) ===
Civil division

- John Kennedy-Good QSO JP – of Lower Hutt. For service to local government and the community.
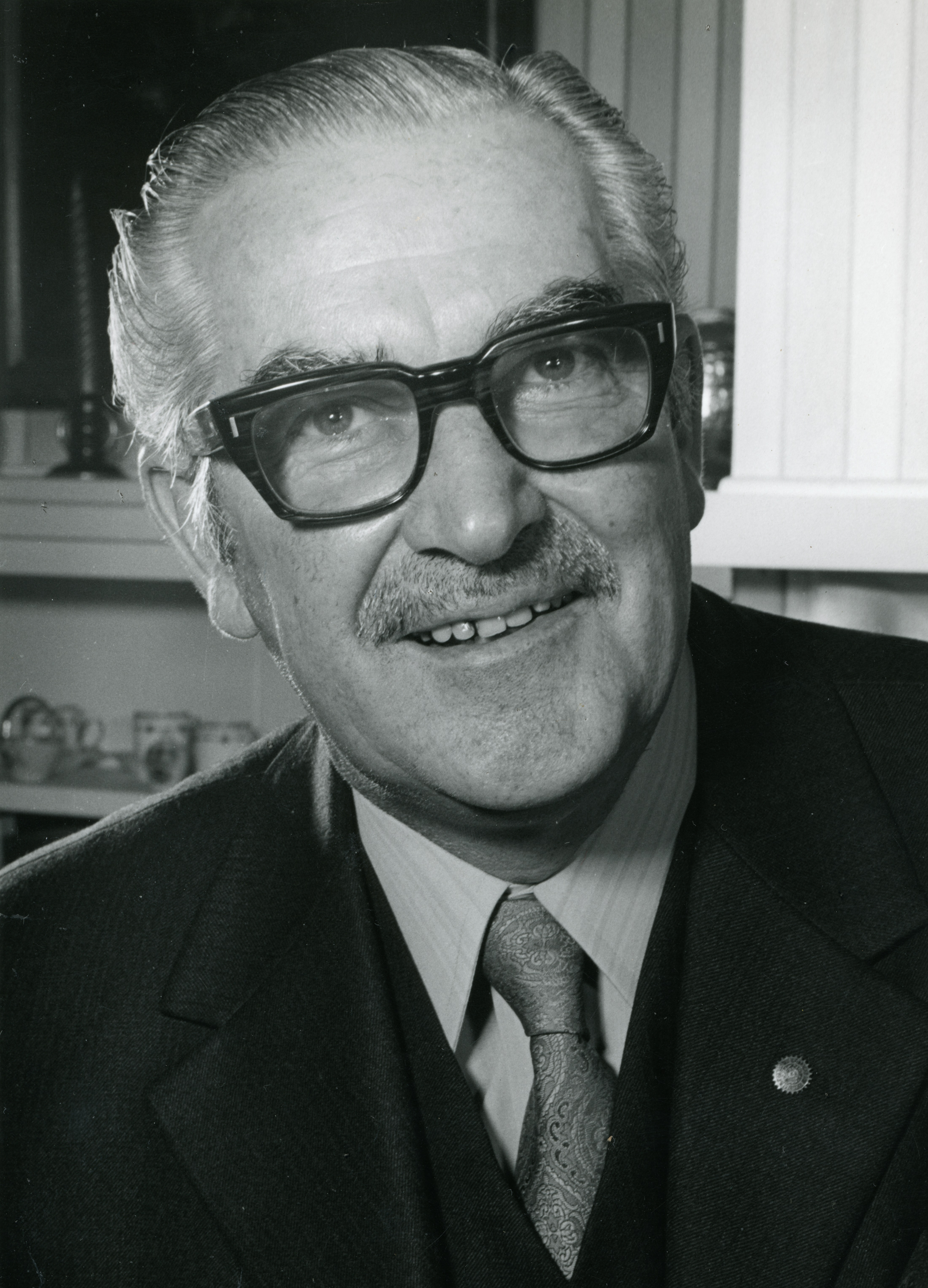
Sir John Kennedy-Good

=== Commander (CBE) ===
Civil division

- Dr Edward George Bollard FRSNZ – of Auckland. For service to science.
- Vivienne Myra Boyd – of Lower Hutt. For public services.
- William Munro Duncan – of Wellington; secretary of energy, Ministry of Energy.
- James Albert Nichols Halford MBE JP – of Norsewood. For service to the community.
- Murray Fitzjohn Hunter – of Christchurch. For service to sport and the community.
- The Most Reverend John Mackey – of Auckland; Roman Catholic Bishop of Auckland. For service to education.
- Hoani Haereroa Parata DSO ED – of Dunedin. For service to the community.
- The Very Reverend Michael Leeke Underhill – of Rangiora; lately dean of Christchurch.
- Robert Alan Vance – of Wellington. For service to cricket and the community.

Military division

- Air Commodore Stuart McIntyre OBE DFC ADC – Royal New Zealand Air Force.

=== Officer (OBE) ===
Civil division

- Leonard Arthur Davis – of Napier. For service to the community.
- David James Gray – of Morrinsville. For service to the community.
- Ashley David Joseph Heenan – of Lower Hutt. For service to music.
- Charles Bruce Inwards – of Auckland. For service to the community.
- Geoffrey William Jackman JP – of Wellington. For service to sport, especially athletics.
- Gladys Mary Reid – of Te Aroha. For service to farming.
- John Bagrie Urwin Roy JP – of Clinton. For service to the community.
- Sydney Ernest Scales – of Dunedin. For service as a cartoonist.
- Horace Raymond Skelton JP – of Huapai. For services to the fruit-growing industry and the community.
- Tasman Alister Smith – of Havelock North. For service to the community.
- Dudley Leonard Storey – of Auckland. For service to rowing.
- Kenneth George Sykes – deputy assistant commissioner, New Zealand Police.
- Valerie Bessie Tarrant – of Hāwera. For service to the Women's Division of Federated Farmers.
- Melvin Charles Taylor – of Wellington; lieutenant colonel, Salvation Army. For service to the Salvation Army and the community.
- William Henry Walker – of Gore. For service to the community.
- Herbert Williamson – of Wellington; assistant secretary (local government), Department of Internal Affairs.
- Dr Raymond Victor James Windsor – of Hertfordshire, England. For humanitarian and medical services to the people of India.
- Ronald Leslie Winter JP – of Auckland. For service as a justice of the peace.

Military division

- Captain Niell McKay Walker – Royal New Zealand Navy.
- Colonel Raymond John Andrews – Colonels' List.
- Wing Commander Geoffrey Allen Parkinson – Royal New Zealand Air Force.
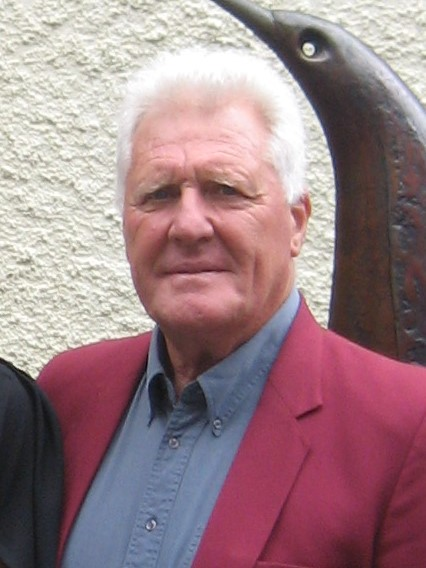
Dudley Storey

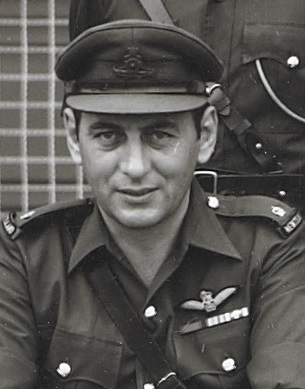
Ray Andrews

=== Member (MBE) ===
Civil division

- Robert Albert Adams – of Pātea. For service to the community.
- Barbara Baxter – of Wanganui. For service to sport.
- Charles Henry Bird – of Wanganui; superintendent, Wanganui Prison, since 1978.
- Peter James Blake – of Auckland. For service to ocean yacht racing.
- Muriel Goodwin Brown – of Auckland. For service to surf lifesaving.
- Wendy Lee Brown – of Wellsford. For service to athletics.
- Dr William John Cowie Crisp – of Dargaville. For service to the community.
- Clement Stanley Currie JP – of Taupō. For service to local government and the community.
- Neroli Susan Fairhall – of Christchurch. For services to archery and the disabled.
- Ivy Alma Foubister – of Auckland. For service to the Plunket Society and the community.
- Russell Douglas Fuller – of Kaikohe. For service to local government and the community.
- Grace Ruth Gamble – of Auckland. For service to the community.
- Karen Ross Margret Glasgow – of Nelson. For service to the community.
- Thomas Leslie Harvey – of Auckland. For service to the community.
- Arthur John Francis Healy – of Christchurch. For service to agriculture.
- Michael Garnstone Hitchings – of Dunedin. For service to the New Zealand Historic Places Trust and the library profession.
- Sylvester Thomas Mahony – of Lower Hutt. For service to the community.
- George Brington Malcolm – of Christchurch; inspecting landscape architect, Ministry of Works and Development, Christchurch, 1975–1982.
- Emarina Manuel – of Wairoa. For service to the Māori people.
- Henry Gordon Markham – of Raumati Beach. For service to the advertising industry and the community.
- Ray McCallum Salisbury – of Upper Hutt; assistant director (field services), Animal Health Division, Ministry of Agriculture and Fisheries, 1972–1981.
- William Joseph Short JP – of Pukekohe. For service to sport and the community.
- Frank Sumner – of Wellington; executive catering manager (Bellamy's), Tourist Hotel Corporation of New Zealand.
- Digby Fergusson Taylor – of Auckland. For services to ocean yacht racing.
- Frederick James Villis JP – of Port Ohope. For services to the community.

Military division

- Warrant Officer Master at Arms Clive Edward Adams – Royal New Zealand Navy.
- Warrant Officer Radio Supervisor Bevan Maurice Lawes – Royal New Zealand Navy.
- Warrant Officer Seaman Horopapera Tamaku Whaanga BEM – Royal New Zealand Navy.
- Warrant Officer Class I John Joseph Cootes – Royal New Zealand Infantry Regiment.
- Warrant Officer Class I Stewart McKenzie Couchman – Royal New Zealand Armoured Corps.
- Major Robert Neil Upton – Royal New Zealand Infantry Regiment.
- Squadron Leader John Kendrick Barry – Royal New Zealand Air Force.
- Squadron Leader John Worden – Royal New Zealand Air Force.
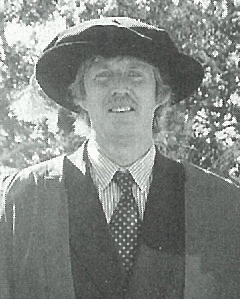
Peter Blake

== British Empire Medal (BEM) ==
Military division

- Chief Petty Officer Master at Arms Thomas Stewart Tupe – Royal New Zealand Navy.
- Temporary Warrant Officer Class II Peter Gordon Barnes – Royal New Zealand Army Ordnance Corps (Territorial Force).
- Temporary Sergeant Alan Kingi Fraser – Royal New Zealand Infantry Regiment (Territorial Force).
- Sergeant Noel Ian Haworth – Royal New Zealand Infantry Regiment.
- Sergeant Norman John Napier – Royal New Zealand Engineers (Territorial Force).
- Sergeant Gary James Cullen – Royal New Zealand Air Force.
- General Service Hand David Whinwray – Royal New Zealand Air Force.

== Companion of the Queen's Service Order (QSO) ==
=== For community service ===
- Vivian William Boyes – of Invercargill.
- The Reverend Robert Frederick Clement – of Auckland.
- Ashton Graham Kelly JP – of Whangārei.
- William Proctor – of Pukekohe.

=== For public services ===
- Arnold Dean Baldwin – of Auckland.
- William John Prideaux Cook MBE – of Tawa; assistant secretary (international finance consultant), The Treasury.
- John William Gow JP – of Whakatāne.
- Harold Bernard Hewett – of Lower Hutt; principal private secretary to the Prime Minister, since 1978.
- Thomas Martin Kimble – of Upper Hutt.
- Charles Seymour Luney – of Christchurch.
- Dr John Woodward Mandeno – of Te Kūiti; superintendent, Te Kuiti Hospital.
- Ronald Gordon Millard – of Lower Hutt; chairman, Rural Banking and Finance Corporation, 1974–1982.
- Helen May Ryburn – of Auckland.
- Thomas Nestor Watson JP – of Waitara.

== Queen's Service Medal (QSM) ==
=== For community service ===
- Joan Helen Andrew – of Wellington.
- Merle Iola Apps – of Tokoroa.
- James Haldane Beaton – detective sergeant, New Zealand Police.
- Dorothy Carson – of Oamaru.
- Leo Francis Daly – senior constable, New Zealand Police.
- Abigail Grace Day – of Auckland.
- Diana Winifred Foley – of Eastbourne.
- Marjorie Axford Jonkers JP – of Auckland.
- Joan Margaret Lees – of Nelson.
- Lucy Elizabeth Lindsay – of Invercargill.
- Ina Beatrice London – of Rotorua.
- Beatrice Aileen McIntyre – of Wairoa.
- Frank MacKinnon – of Wellington.
- Beeban Annadale McKnight JP – of Rangitikei.
- Marjorie Beatrice Morgan – of Napier.
- John Morris Everness Newman – of Arrowtown.
- Marcia Proctor – of Shannon.
- (Niria) Yvonne Rust – of Whangārei.
- Harold Stephen Sivyer – of Palmerston North.
- Sydney Harold William Torkington – of Auckland.
- Kristin Zambucka – of Hawaii, United States.
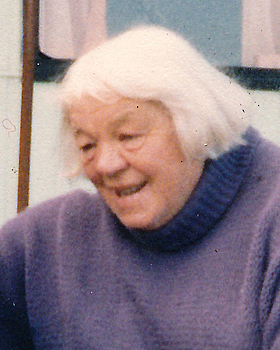
Yvonne Rust

=== For public services ===
- Thomas Redmond Bourke JP – of Eltham.
- Leicester William Charles Chatfield JP – of Waitoa.
- The Reverend Father John Patrick Egden SM – of Wellington.
- Lucy Tui Hampton Flower – of Auckland.
- George Groombridge – of Masterton.
- Dorothy Turner Horsfield – of Wellington; lately sister-in-charge, Audiology Department, Wellington Hospital.
- Jeffrey MacGlashan Inglis – of Motueka.
- Grace Kerehi Maxwell – of Ōpōtiki.
- Evelyn Rose Moody – of Christchurch.
- Joan Moore – of Auckland.
- Howard Gordon McGowan – of Auckland.
- James Ian Brown Neil JP – of Auckland.
- Catherine Shirley Ellen Paine – of Dunedin.
- Roka Paora – of Te Kaha.
- Ruby Ellen Pierson – of Nelson.
- Florence May Sandison – of Kaitaia.
- Donald William Noel Saunders – of Tokoroa.
- Laurence Ernest Smith JP – of Christchurch.
- Ralph James Willocks – of Balclutha.

== Royal Red Cross ==
=== Associate (ARRC) ===
- Major Noeline Jean Taylor QHNS – Royal New Zealand Nursing Corps.

== Air Force Cross (AFC) ==
- Squadron Leader John Stephenson Bates – Royal New Zealand Air Force.

== Queen's Fire Services Medal (QFSM) ==
- Richard John Gillespie – deputy chief fire officer, Cust Volunteer Fire Brigade, New Zealand Fire Service.
- Louis Harvey Jillings – lately district commander and chief fire officer, Hastings Fire Brigade, New Zealand Fire Service.
- Trevor Garnett Thomson – district commander and chief fire officer, Papatoetoe Volunteer Fire Brigade, New Zealand Fire Service.
- Mervin James Topp – chief fire officer, Picton Volunteer Fire Brigade, New Zealand Fire Service.

== Queen's Police Medal (QPM) ==
- John Munro – inspector, New Zealand Police.

== Queen's Commendation for Valuable Service in the Air ==
- Master Engineer Peter Tennant Weeks – Royal New Zealand Air Force.
