= 1990 New Year Honours (New Zealand) =

Awards list for New Zealand

The 1990 New Year Honours in New Zealand were appointments by Elizabeth II on the advice of the New Zealand government to various orders and honours to reward and highlight good works by New Zealanders. The awards celebrated the passing of 1989 and the beginning of 1990, and were announced on 30 December 1989.

The recipients of honours are displayed here as they were styled before their new honour.

== Order of the Companions of Honour (CH) ==
- The Right Honourable David Russell Lange MP – of Wellington; Attorney-General and Minister of State, lately Prime Minister of New Zealand.
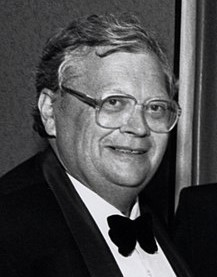
David Lange

== Knight Bachelor ==
- The Honourable (Thomas) Kerry Burke MP – of Greymouth; Speaker of the House of Representatives.
- The Honourable (Mr Justice) Muir Fitzherbert Chilwell – of Auckland; judge of the High Court.
- Brian George Conway Elwood CBE JP – of Wellington. For services to local government.
- James Thompson Graham CMG – of Mount Maunganui. For services to the dairy industry.
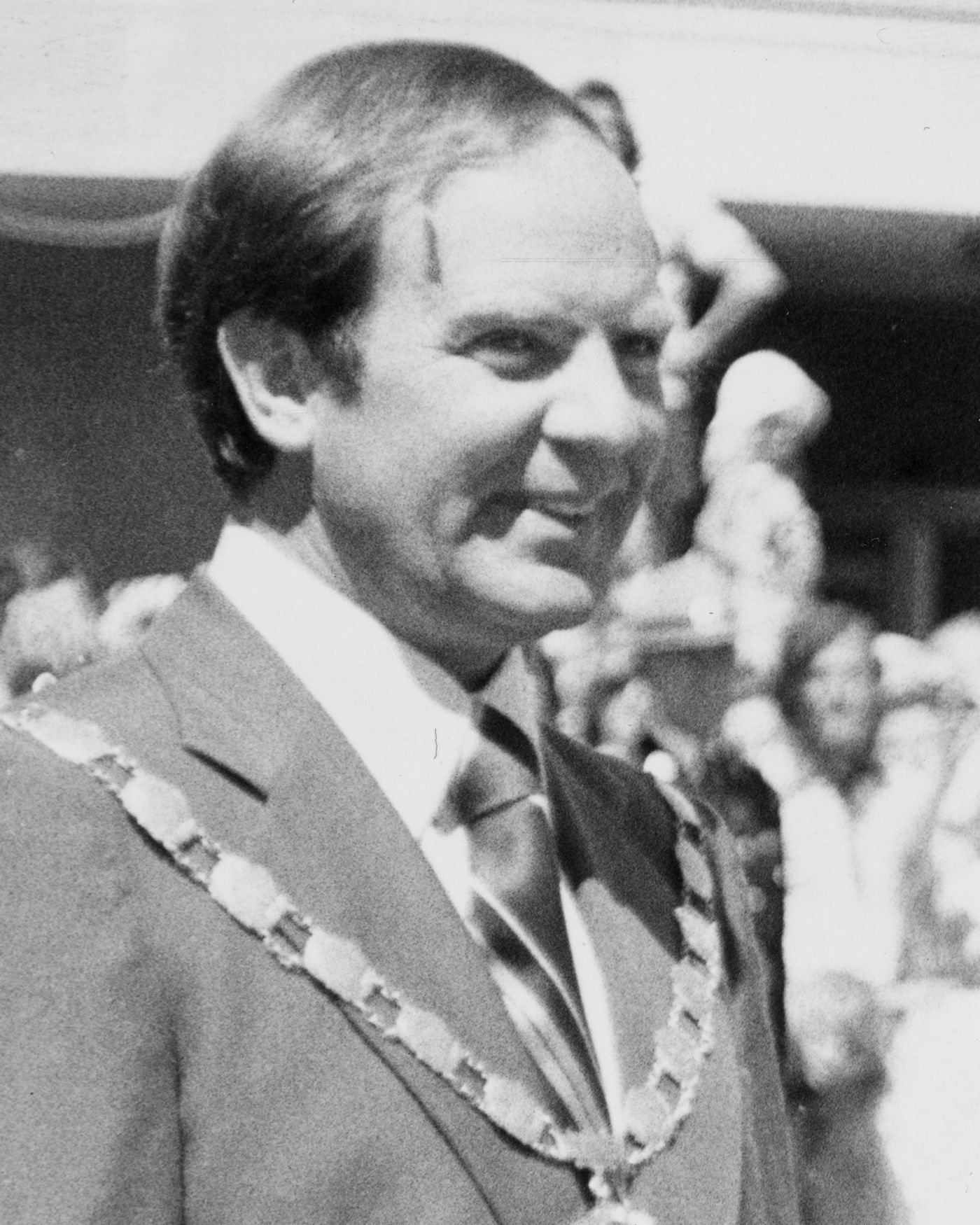
Sir Brian Elwood

== Order of Saint Michael and Saint George ==
=== Companion (CMG) ===
- John William Hodgetts – of Auckland. For services to the building industry and the community.
- Colin Isaac Patterson – of Wellington; chairman of the Securities Commission.

== Order of the British Empire ==
=== Dame Commander (DBE) ===
Civil division

- Miraka Petricevich Szászy CBE JP – of Kaitaia. For services to the community.

=== Knight Commander (KBE) ===
Civil division

- Monita Eru Delamere JP – of Ōpōtiki. For services to the Māori people.

=== Commander (CBE) ===
Civil division

- Professor David Killoch Blackmore – of Palmerston North. For services to veterinary science.
- Patrick Ledger Goodman – of Motueka. For services to business management and the community.
- Colin Milton Kay JP – of Auckland. For services to local government, sport and the community.
- Edmund Binney Lock – of Christchurch. For services to journalism.
- Professor William Hosking Oliver – of Wellington. For services to historical research.
- Pauline Margaret O'Regan (Sister Pauline O'Regan) – of Christchurch. For services to education and the community.
- Professor Emeritus Marion Frances Robinson – of Dunedin. For services to nutrition education and research.
- Iona Williams OBE JP – of Dunedin. For services to local government, education and the community.

Military division

- Brigadier Richard Ewart Menzies ED – Brigadiers' List, New Zealand Army (Territorial Force).
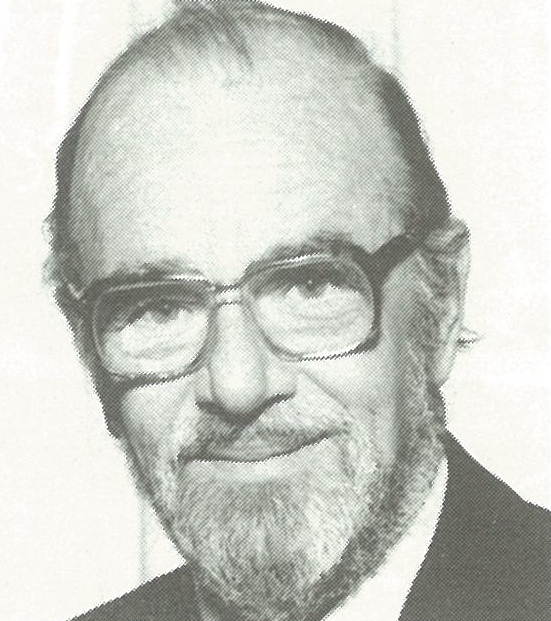
David Blackmore

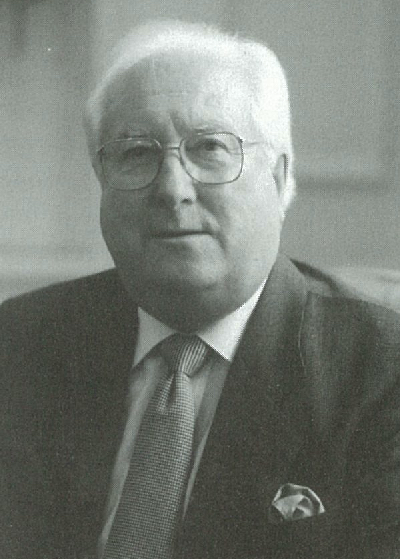
Pat Goodman

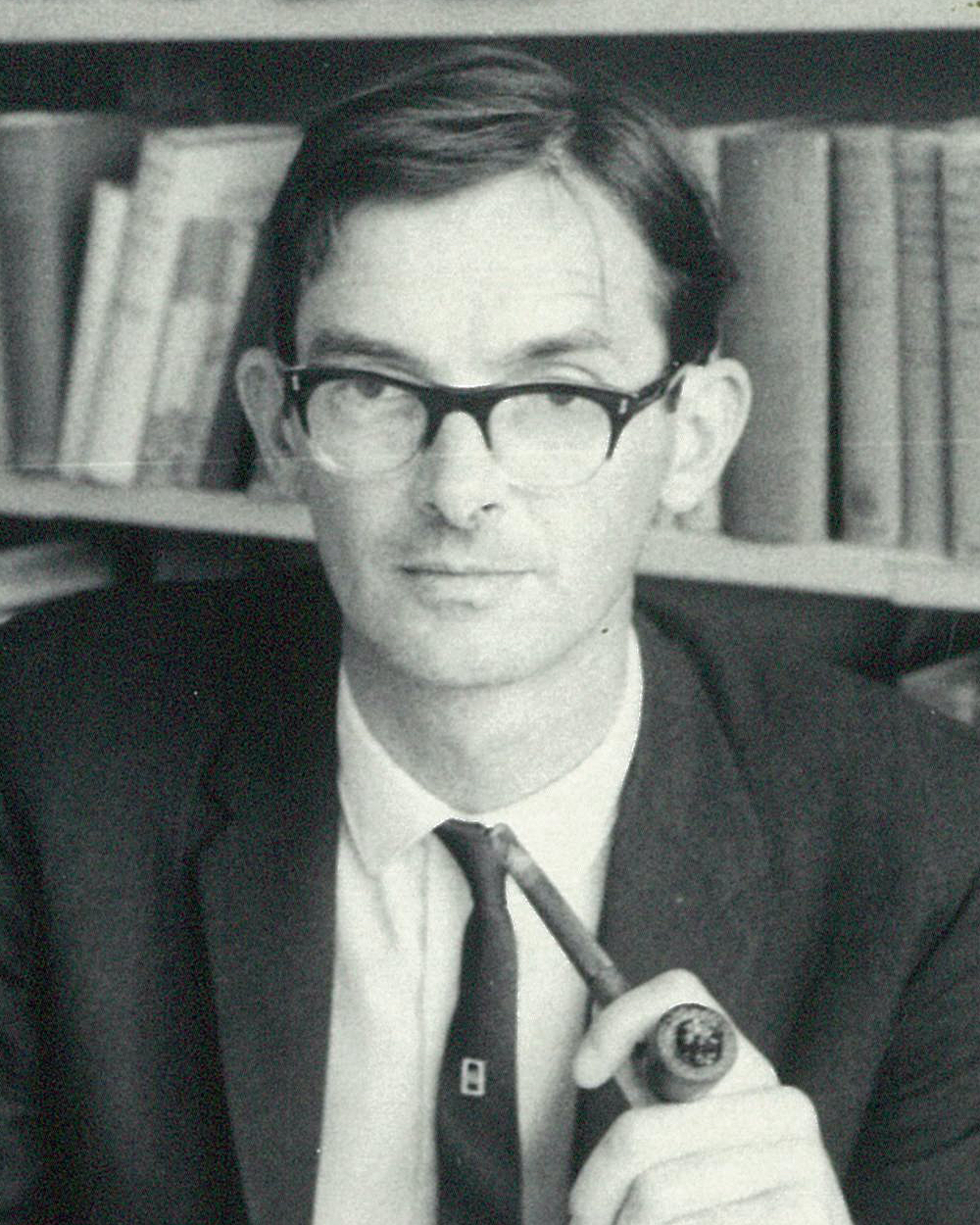
Bill Oliver

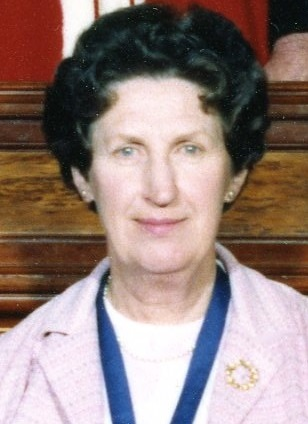
Iona Williams

=== Officer (OBE) ===
Civil division

- Ian Nevis Bird – assistant commissioner, New Zealand Police.
- Ian William Gore Cochrane – of Wellington. For services to the arts.
- Dr Barry Mitchell Dallas JP – of Greymouth. For services to local government and the community.
- Joan Elsa Donley – of Auckland, For services to midwifery.
- Bernard John Drake – of Christchurch. For services to sport and the community.
- Dr Albert James Ellis – of Lower Hutt; lately director-general, Department of Scientific and Industrial Research.
- John Charles Fair – of Wellington. For services to the petroleum industry and the community.
- Alan Keith Familton – of Wellington. For services to forestry.
- Dr Eric John Godley – of Christchurch. For services to botany.
- Walter Hirsh – of Auckland; lately Race Relations Conciliator.
- John Dempsey O'Shea – of Wellington. For services to the film industry.
- Dr Margaret Stuart Smith – of Christchurch. For services to medicine and the community.
- (William) Kendrick Smithyman – of Auckland. For services to literature.
- Rex George Stewart – of Christchurch. For services to the wool industry.
- Rawson (Ross) Wright JP – of Wellsford. For services to the Māori people and the community.
- Professor Frederick John Lenane Young – of Raumati South. For services to industrial relations.

Military division

- Colonel Joseph James Walker – Colonels' List, New Zealand Army.

=== Member (MBE) ===
Civil division

- Tamati (Thomas) Pawa Bailey JP – of Motueka. For services to the community.
- Vera Esther Burt – of Auckland. For services to sport, especially women's hockey, and the community.
- Ewen John Chatfield – of Lower Hutt. For services to cricket.
- Terence John Dunleavy – of Auckland. For services to the wine industry and the community.
- Geoffrey Millis Findley JP – of Invercargill. For services to agriculture.
- George McMurray Fuller – of New Plymouth. For services to horticulture.
- Alfred William Gallagher – of Hamilton. For services to the community.
- Frank Jackson Lamont Gurr – of Wellington. For services to music.
- Iranui Teaonohoriu Haig – of Tokomaru Bay. For services to the Māori people.
- John Esmond Hartstonge JP – of Upper Hutt. For services to tourism and the community.
- Joseph John Hinton JP – of Auckland. For services to local-body and community affairs.
- Elizabeth Mary Ann Jackson – of Dunedin. For services to the Order of St John and the community.
- Elspeth Cantlie Kennedy – of Nelson. For services to tourism.
- Kenneth William Kersley – of Lower Hutt; counsel to the Parliamentary Counsel Office.
- Alistair George Malcolm – of Christchurch. For services to the fruitgrowing industry and the community.
- John Wardell Malcolmson – of Plimmerton. For services to engineering.
- Margharet Norma Matenga – of Rarotonga, Cook Islands (formerly of Wellington). For services to netball.
- Mata Te Hoturoa Morehu JP – of Rotorua. For services to the Māori people.
- Basil David Parkes – of Tuamarina. For services to farming.
- Ivor Rudolph Powell JP – of Dunedin. For services to trade-union affairs.
- Kathleen Priscilla Rangi – of New Plymouth. For services to the community.
- Colin Harry Russell – of Christchurch. For services to tertiary education and the community.
- Maureen Mary Seipolt JP – of Tokoroa. For services to the community.
- Norman Anthony Thorn – of Alexandra. For services to brass bands.
- Alexander Reid Veysey – of Raumati Beach. For services to journalism.
- Nesslea Quentin Wright – of Sheffield. For services to agriculture.

Military division

- Warrant Officer William Alfred Beale BEM – Royal New Zealand Navy.
- Warrant Officer Class 1 Eru Hamuera Brown – New Zealand Army Physical Training Corps.
- Squadron Leader Raymond George McKay – Royal New Zealand Air Force.
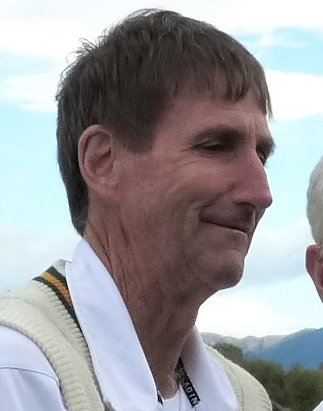
Ewen Chatfield

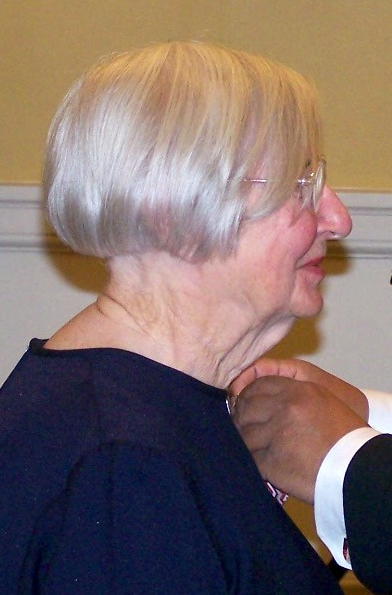
Elspeth Kennedy

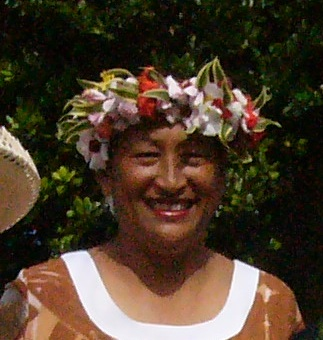
Margharet Matenga

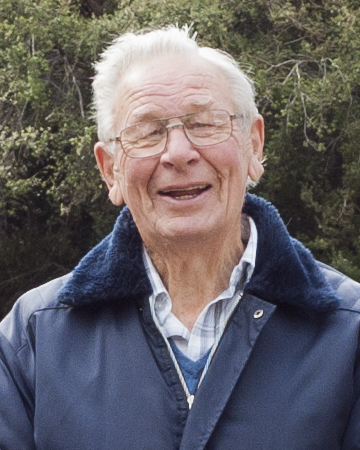
Basil Parkes

== British Empire Medal (BEM) ==
Military division

- Chief Petty Officer Lyndsay Alan Fletcher – Royal New Zealand Navy.
- Chief Petty Officer William Arthur Peacock – Royal New Zealand Navy.
- Staff Sergeant (now Acting Warrant Officer Class II) Bryan James McKenzie – Royal New Zealand Infantry Regiment.

== Companion of the Queen's Service Order (QSO) ==
=== For community service ===
- The Reverend William Selwyn Dawson – of Auckland.
- Joseph de Valley McManemin CBE JP – of Auckland.
- Erihapeti Rehu Murchie – of Wanganui.
- Harata Ria Te Uira Solomon – of Porirua.
- Eileen Norma Walding – of Palmerston North.

=== For public services ===
- The Right Honourable John Bowie Gordon – of Tapanui.
- Dr Reginald Henry James Hamlin OBE – of Addis Ababa, Ethiopia.
- Hugh Wilson Hayward MBE JP – of Ngatea.
- Ian Anthony Johnstone – of Lower Hutt.
- John Baldwin Munro – of Lower Hutt.
- James Alexander Ross – of Waikanae; lately principal educational consultant, Department of Education.
- Jennifer Daphne Simpson – of Inglewood.
- John James Terris MP – of Lower Hutt; Chairman of Committees, House of Representatives.
- The Honourable Venn Spearman Young MP – of Hāwera.
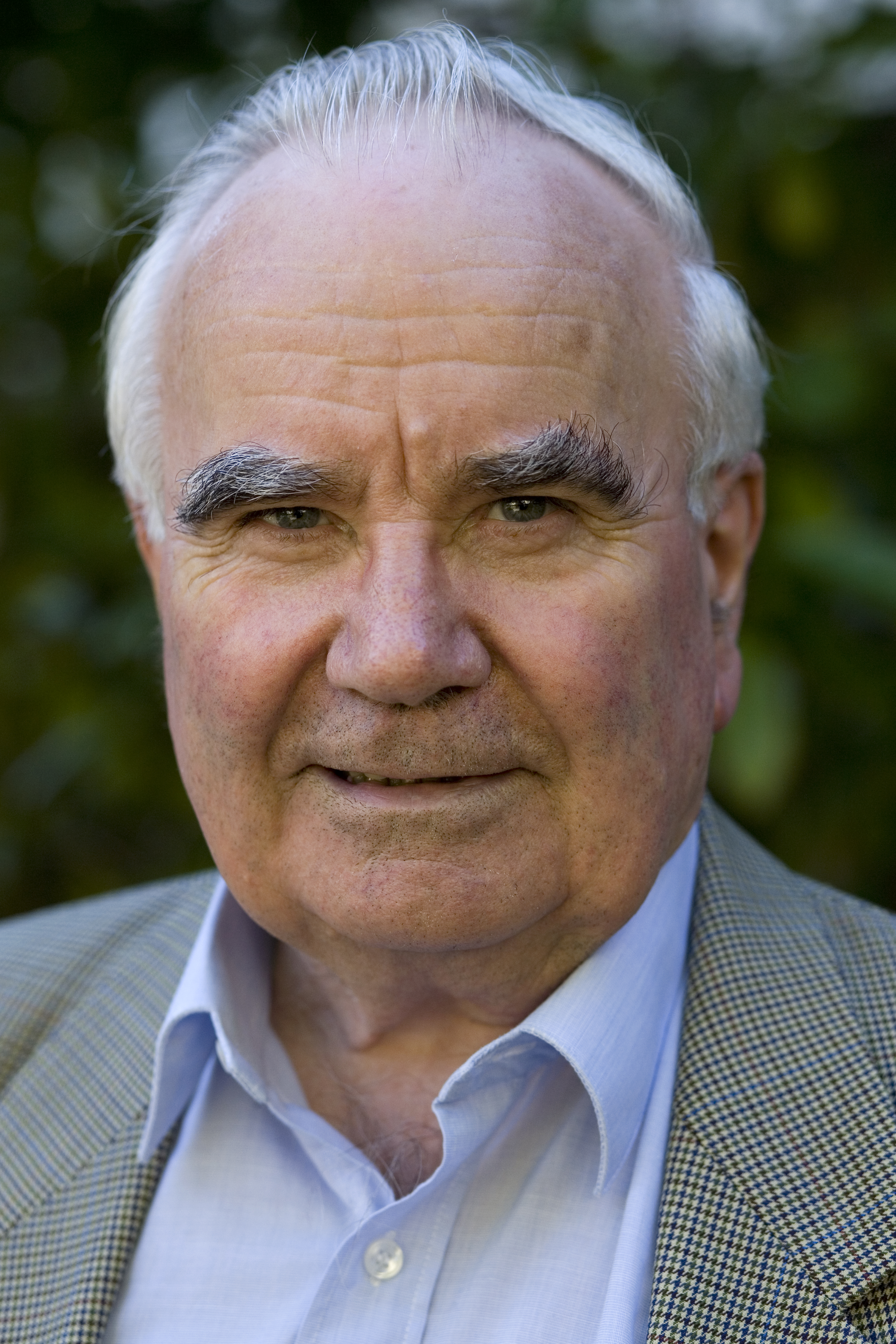
J.B. Munro

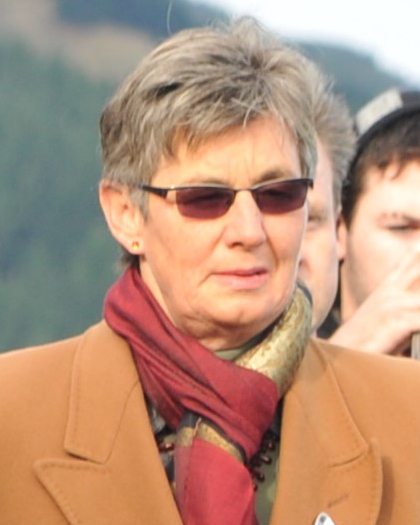
Jenny Simpson

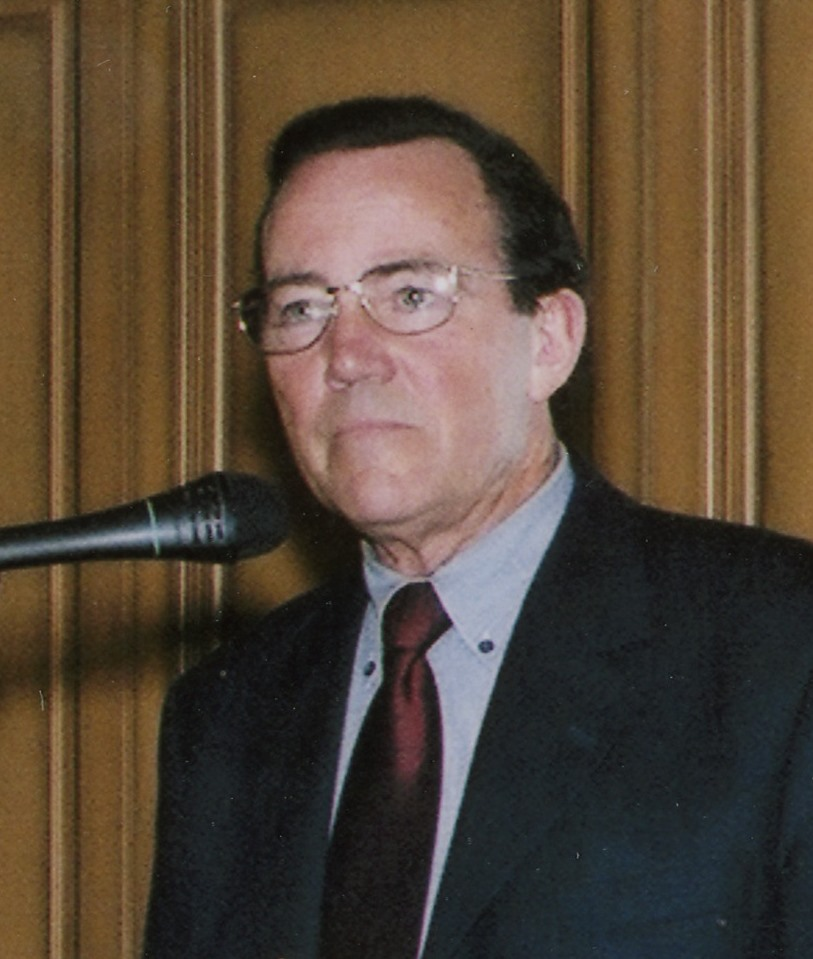
John Terris

== Queen's Service Medal (QSM) ==
=== For community service ===
- Rachel Albert – of Auckland.
- Michael John Andrew – of Christchurch.
- Barbara Staples Archer – of Palmerston North.
- Joseph Thomas Bartle – of Stoke.
- Neil Fifield Buckley – of Mosgiel.
- Jabez Ernest Chapman – of Te Kūiti.
- Letitia June Clifford – of Napier.
- Ian Anthony Davidson JP – of Christchurch.
- Ethel Elizabeth Dighton – of Wellington.
- Mavis Josephine Ewart – of Mosgiel.
- Andrew Bruce Fordyce – of Ōpōtiki.
- Albert Purvis (Bill) Freeman JP – of Wellington.
- Lawrence Gordon Hargrave – of Auckland.
- David James Hughey – of Christchurch.
- The Reverend Turi Karati – of Porirua.
- Lealaiauloto Okesene Sakaria Lealaiauloto – of Auckland.
- The Reverend Canon Gon Loong – of Wellington.
- Shivalal Bhukhandas Masters – of Auckland.
- Whaia Te Rangi McClutchie – of Ruatoria.
- Raymond George Middlemiss – of Gisborne.
- Ernest Edward Stanton Probert JP – of Auckland.
- Gwendoline Naomi Radford – of Wellington.
- Joseph Henry Salt – of Christchurch.
- Betty Marian Steffensen – of Palmerston North.
- Colin Campbell Stuart – of Tapanui.
- Ruby Parfitt Stuart – of Tapanui.
- Teariki Tuiono JP – of Auckland.
- Turi Iti Turia – of Tokoroa.
- Sylvia Joan Vowless – of Auckland.
- Captain Te Waari Kahukura Ward Whaitiri – of Wellington.

=== For public services ===
- Thomas Te Wahia Apes – of Christchurch; senior traffic sergeant, Ministry of Transport, Christchurch.
- Walter Osborne Askew – of Christchurch. (Note: Deceased 12 December 1989. Her Majesty's approval of this award was signified prior to the date of decease.)
- Isobel Helen Ivy Bremner – of Queenstown.
- Peter Winston Daniel – of Kapiti Island.
- Keith De Dulin – senior constable, New Zealand Police.
- Norman Austin Dewhurst – of Auckland.
- Betty Nola Dunbar – of Hamilton.
- Eileen Lesley (Jane) English – of Christchurch.
- Dr Sholto Grant Faris – of Auckland.
- Elizabeth Ronald Gardiner – of Bluff.
- Edith Mary Grut – of Waimate.
- Dr Helen Robyn Hewland – of Christchurch.
- Ralph Hutchings – of Auckland.
- Margaret Mary Inkster JP – of Masterton.
- Anna Eccles Innes – of Greymouth.
- Richard John Jackson – of Auckland; lately senior inspector of prisons, Department of Justice.
- Ronald Charles Kersel – of Palmerston North.
- Agnes Mary (Eti) Ivala-Laufiso JP – of Wellington.
- Bruce Alan Kitto – constable, New Zealand Police.
- Dr Ronald Robert Macintyre – of Christchurch.
- Brian Neilson McIvor – of Hamilton.
- Jeanette Laurel Massey (Sister Juliana SM) – of Auckland.
- John Matheson JP – of Christchurch.
- James Dalton Milburn – of Upper Hutt.
- Paul William Mitchell JP – of Wanganui.
- Douglas George Morrison – of Whangārei.
- June Martha Mulgrew (now Lady Hillary) – of Auckland.
- William Clydesdale Nairn JP – of Wellington.
- Rodney Nees JP – of Tākaka.
- Clifford Jack Owen JP – of Wairoa.
- Philippa Jane Parker – of New Plymouth.
- Lila Joyce Petherick – of Auckland.
- Eric Frank Presling – of Napier.
- Dr Nagalingam Rasalingam – of Auckland.
- Maurice Russell (Brother Maurice) – of Auckland.
- Niko Maihi Tangaroa – of Auckland.
- Lyall Bertrand Thomas – of Christchurch.
- Peggy Tombs JP – of Blenheim.
- Desmond Sarney Walker – of Christchurch.
- Kelly Russell Wilson JP – of Hokitika.
- Alfred Henry Longueville Woodward – of Auckland.
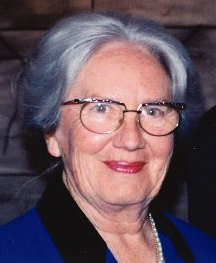
June, Lady Hillary

== Queen's Fire Service Medal (QFSM) ==
- Kerry John Everson – fire force commander, No. 4 Region (Wellington), New Zealand Fire Service.
- Harry Sim Greenyer – divisional officer (fire safety), Dunedin, New Zealand Fire Service.
- Jock Primmer – chief fire officer, Motueka Volunteer Fire Brigade, New Zealand Fire Service
- Raymond William Rook – lately chief fire officer, Ōkato Volunteer Fire Brigade, New Zealand Fire Service.

== Queen's Police Medal (QPM) ==
- John Rex Hughes – detective inspector, New Zealand Police.

== Air Force Cross (AFC) ==
- Squadron Leader Warwick Robert Bell – Royal New Zealand Air Force.
