= Betty Steffensen =

New Zealand netball player and administrator

Betty Steffensen QSM
Personal information
- Full name: Betty Marian Steffensen (Née: Pratt)
- Born: 27 April 1936 (age 90)
- Occupation: Schoolteacher
- Height: 1.53 m (5 ft 0 in)

Netball career
- Playing position: GA
Years	National team	Caps
1960	New Zealand	1

Betty Marian Steffensen QSM (née Pratt; born 27 April 1936) is a former New Zealand netball player, coach, umpire and administrator. She played one Test match for the New Zealand team on their 1960 tour to Australia. She later served as president of Manawatu Netball for 21 years and was vice-president of Netball New Zealand for 12 years. Steffensen has been the patron of Netball Manawatu since 2016.

== Early life ==
Steffensen was born Betty Marian Pratt on 27 April 1936, the daughter of Jack and Ivy Pratt (née Davey), who farmed at Kairanga, west of Palmerston North. She studied at Christchurch Teachers' College and became a schoolteacher specialising in physical education.

== Netball career ==
=== Player ===
While she was a student at Christchurch Teachers' College, Pratt played netball for the Canterbury provincial representative team. She was a member of the Canterbury team that won the national championships at Hastings in 1954, going through the tournament unbeaten. By 1959, she had married and was known by her married name. That year, Steffensen was part of the Manawatu team that won the second-grade championship at the national netball championships in Nelson. At the conclusion of the tournament, she was named captain of the North Island Minor team to play South Island Minor.

In 1960, Steffensen was selected as vice-captain of the New Zealand team to tour Australia. She appeared in one of the three Test matches, playing at goal attack in the second Test in Melbourne, which was won by Australia, 44–39. In the match, Steffensen made 12 goals from 27 attempts, in trying, windy conditions.

Steffensen retired from playing in 1962.

=== Coach, umpire and administrator ===
Following her playing career, Steffensen continued her involvement in netball as a coach, umpire and administrator. She was the first former New Zealand player to qualify as an international umpire, and she also became an examiner. She served as president of Netball Manawatu for 12 years, and for 12 years was the vice-president of Netball New Zealand. In 2016, she succeeded Vern Chettleburgh as patron of Netball Manawatu.

Steffensen was the manager of the New Zealand netball team from 1980 to 1984, including at the 1983 World Netball Tournament.

== Other sports ==
Steffensen also played badminton, basketball and tennis to provincial representative level.

== Honours and awards ==
In the 1990 New Year Honours, Steffensen was awarded the Queen's Service Medal for community service. In 1993, she received the New Zealand Suffrage Centennial Medal.

In 1991, Steffensen was made a life member of Netball Manawatu and Netball New Zealand. She was named as a Manawatu legend of sport at the 2007 Manawatu Sportsperson of the Year awards. in 2010, a new pavilion at Vautier Park in Palmerston North was named the Steffensen Lounge in her honour.
