= Florence Harsant =

Florence Marie Harsant QSM (née Woodhead; 19 September 1891 – 19 June 1994) was a New Zealand temperance worker, nurse, community leader and writer.

== Biography ==
She was born in New Plymouth, New Zealand, on 19 September 1891.

In the 1981 Queen's Birthday Honours, Harsant was awarded the Queen's Service Medal for community service.

Harsant wrote a book They called me Te Maari about her nursing experiences.

She died on 19 June 1994, aged 102.
