= Binney Lock =

New Zealand newspaper editor

Binney Lock CBE
- Born: Edmund Binney Lock; 21 May 1932; New Zealand
- Died: 16 November 2014 (aged 82); Christchurch, New Zealand
- Occupation: Journalist
- Known for: Editor of The Press (1978–90)

Edmund Binney Lock CBE (21 May 1932 – 16 November 2014) was a New Zealand journalist, and editor of The Press newspaper in Christchurch from 1978 to 1990.

== Biography ==
Born in 1932, Lock was educated at Christ's College, Christchurch from 1945 to 1949. He attended Canterbury University College, graduating with a Master of Arts degree in 1957.

He joined The Press as a copyholder in 1951, later becoming a reporter. In the 1960s he worked in the parliamentary press gallery, and in 1972 he became assistant editor of The Press. He was editor from 1978 until his retirement in 1990.

In the 1990 New Year Honours, Lock was appointed a Commander of the Order of the British Empire, for services to journalism.

Lock served as secretary of the Canterbury History Foundation from its establishment in 1999 until 2013. He wrote a number of local histories, including: Medbury, 1923–1973: Story of a Family School (published 1973) and The Anglican Church in Oxford and Cust (1966).

He died from cancer in Christchurch in 2014.
