= Russell Pettigrew =

New Zealand businessman and philanthropist

Sir Russell Hilton Pettigrew (10 September 1920 – 20 March 2015) was a New Zealand businessman and philanthropist. He was the founder of transport company Freightways Ltd.

== Biography ==
Pettigrew was born at Hangatiki (between Ōtorohanga and Te Kūiti) in 1920, attended Te Kuiti District High School and served in the navy during World War II. In 1964, he founded Freightways Ltd.

Pettigrew was a rugby player and later was a member of the Hawke's Bay Rugby Union, serving as its president and patron. He was also president of the New Zealand Rugby Football Union. In 1986, Pettigrew and Kel Tremain established the New Zealand Rugby Foundation. He was the patron of the Sensible Sentencing Trust and bred, owned and raced Thoroughbred racehorses, beginning in the 1970s.

In the 1983 New Year Honours, Pettigrew was appointed a Knight Bachelor, for services to the transport industry. He was inducted into the Hawke's Bay Business Hall of Fame in 2010, the New Zealand Road Transport Hall of Fame in 2013, and the New Zealand Business Hall of Fame in 2015.

Pettigrew died in Hawke's Bay in 2015.
