= Vivienne Boyd =

Dame Vivienne Boyd DBE
- Born: Vivienne Myra Lowe; 11 April 1926; Lower Hutt, New Zealand
- Died: 13 July 2011 (aged 85); Lower Hutt, New Zealand
- Education: Hutt Valley High School
- Alma mater: Victoria University College
- Known for: Community leader
- Spouse: Robert Macdonald Boyd (m. 1948; died 2004)
- Children: 4

Dame Vivienne Myra Boyd DBE (née Lowe, 11 April 1926 – 13 July 2011) was a New Zealand woman active in community and public affairs.

== Early life and family ==
Born Vivienne Myra Lowe in Lower Hutt on 11 April 1926, Boyd was the daughter of Winifred and Hugh Lowe. She was educated at Hutt Valley High School from 1940 to 1943, and then studied at Victoria University College, graduating Master of Science with third-class honours in 1948.

In 1948, she married Robert Macdonald Boyd, and the couple went on to have four children.

== Community and public life ==
She was president of the National Council of Women (1978–1982), a member and later chair of the Consumer Council (1975–1988), and chair of the Abortion Supervisory Committee (1979–1980).

She had active lay leadership roles in the Epuni Baptist Church, and wider New Zealand Baptist roles as president of the Baptist Women's League (1966–1968), as a member and later convenor of the Public Questions Committee (1967–1972, 1977–1979), as a member of the Baptist Union Council (1970–1985) and as president of the Baptist Union (1984–1985). She was the first woman to hold the latter two positions.

== Honours ==
In 1977, Boyd was awarded the Queen Elizabeth II Silver Jubilee Medal. She was appointed a Commander of the Order of the British Empire in the 1983 New Year Honours, and then in the 1986 Queen's Birthday Honours, she was promoted to Dame Commander of the same order, for public and community services.

== Death ==
Boyd died in Lower Hutt in 2011, and was buried in the Taita Old Cemetery. She had been predeceased by her husband, Robert, in 2004.
