= Terry Dunleavy =

New Zealand wine industry leader (1928–2022)

Terry Dunleavy MBE JP
- Born: Terence John Dunleavy; 23 November 1928; Te Awamutu, New Zealand
- Died: 14 March 2022 (aged 93); Takapuna, New Zealand
- Political party: National

Terence John Dunleavy (23 November 1928 – 14 March 2022) was a New Zealand wine industry leader, politician and columnist. In the 1990 New Year Honours, he was appointed a Member of the Order of the British Empire, for services to the wine industry and the community.
