= Colin McLeod (engineer) =

New Zealand civil engineer (1921–2018)

Colin McLeod CMG

Commissioner of Works
- In office 1973–1981
- Preceded by: Jim Macky
- Succeeded by: Jack Chesterman

Personal details
- Born: Norman Colin McLeod; 5 August 1921 Auckland, New Zealand
- Died: 6 April 2018 (aged 96) Wellington, New Zealand
- Spouse: Ella Margaret McEwan (m. 1946; died 2011)
- Education: Canterbury University College
- Profession: Civil engineer

Norman Colin McLeod CMG (5 August 1921 – 6 April 2018) was a New Zealand civil engineer, who served as the Commissioner of Works between 1973 and 1981.

== Early life and education ==
McLeod was born in Auckland on 5 August 1921, the son of Norman John Murdoch McLeod, also an engineer, and Eva Mary McLeod (née Ringrose). Raised in the Wellington suburb of Karori, he was educated at Wellington College, and went on to study civil engineering at Canterbury University College, graduating BE in 1942.

== Early career and military service ==
Following graduation, McLeod initially worked in the Public Works Department, designing coastal defences. In April 1943, he was commissioned as a second lieutenant in the Corps of New Zealand Engineers, but was decommissioned and sent overseas in January 1944 as a sapper, serving in Italy. He was again commissioned as a second lieutenant in February 1945, and served as adjutant to Brigadier Fred Hanson. In March 1946, he went to Japan with the 5th Engineer Company as part of J Force.

== Post-war family and career ==
Returning to New Zealand in September 1946, he married Ella Margaret McEwan, and the couple went on to have three children.

McLeod resumed his career with the Ministry of Works, and in 1949 moved to Mangakino, where he rose to become the project engineer for construction of the Waikato River dams. In 1962, McLeod became district commissioner of works in Wanganui. and then, from 1964 to 1966, district commissioner of Works in Hamilton. After an Eisenhower Exchange Fellowship in the United States in 1966, McLeod served as director of the National Water and Soil Conservation Authority from 1966 to 1971. He was appointed Commissioner of Works, succeeding Jim Macky, in 1973, and served in that capacity until his retirement in 1981, when he was succeeded by Jack Chesterman. In the 1981 Queen's Birthday Honours, McLeod was appointed a Companion of the Order of St Michael and St George, in recognition of his service as commissioner.

== Later life and death ==
McLeod's wife, Ella, was active in community activities, including 15 years as a member of the Wellington Hospital Board from 1974 to 1989. In the 1982 Queen's Birthday Honours, she was awarded the Queen's Service Medal for community service. She died on 20 June 2011.

Colin McLeod died in Wellington on 6 April 2018.
