= Emarina Manuel =

New Zealand typist, teacher and Māori welfare officer

Emarina "Lena" Manuel QSO MBE (née Rōpata; 21 August 1915 – 16 August 1996) was a New Zealand typist, teacher, Māori welfare officer and community leader. Of Māori descent, Manuel identified with the Ngāti Kahungunu iwi. She was born in Wairoa, New Zealand, on 21 August 1915.

Manuel attended Hukarere Native School for Girls.

In the 1983 New Year Honours, Manuel was appointed a Member of the Order of the British Empire, for services to the Māori people. In the 1991 Queen's Birthday Honours, she was made a Companion of the Queen's Service Order for community service.
