= Te Waari Kahukura Whaitiri =

Te Waari Kahukura Whaitiri QSM (11 September 1912 – 26 November 1996) was a notable New Zealand master mariner and community worker. Of Māori descent, he identified with the Ngāi Tahu and Ngāti Mutunga iwi. He was born in Kairakau, Chatham Islands, New Zealand, in 1912.

In the 1990 New Year Honours, Whaitiri was awarded the Queen's Service Medal for community service.
