= Archibald George William Dunningham =

New Zealand librarian (1907–1996)

Archibald George William Dunningham (26 April 1907 – 16 April 1996) was a New Zealand librarian. He was born in Napier, Hawke's Bay, New Zealand on 26 April 1907.

== Life ==
Archibald George William Dunningham was born in Napier, New Zealand on April 26, 1907, the son of William Dunningham (1869–1959) and Mary Marshall (née Thomson; 1871–1960). In 1929 Dunningham became an assistant in the General Assembly Library and later moved onto become deputy chief librarian to the Wellington Public Library in 1932. At the age of 46 Dunningham first went to Indonesia in 1953 as the UNESCO mission's library consultant. By the end of 1968, he had served for six years and had become a major architect of Indonesian library policy and practice.
