= Ian Grey =

Australian historian

Ian Grey (5 May 1918 – 5 June 1996) was a New Zealand-born historian of Russian history.

== Biography ==
He began his career as a lawyer, a member of the New South Wales Bar. In 1941 he joined the Australian navy and was posted at Naval Intelligence of the Admiralty in London, then serving in the Soviet Union as an officer. He served for two and a half years in the Russian north, acting as a liaison for British Destroyers of the Soviet Navy in the Arctic. He also served as Deputy Secretary-General and the editor of publications of the Commonwealth Parliamentary Association Headquarters Secretariat from 1966 until his retirement. In 1971 he established the Parliamentary Information and Reference Centre.

== Bibliography ==
- Peter the Great, Emperor of all Russia, Philadelphia, Lippincott (1960), 505 p.
- Catherine the Great, Autocrat and Empress of All Russia, Philadelphia, Lippincott (1962), 254 p.
  - Paru en France sous le titre: La Grande Catherine, Cercle du bibliophile (1970), 297 p.
- Ivan the Terrible, Hodder & Stoughton (1964) 256p.
- Ivan III and the Unification of Russia, The English Universities Press (1964), 182 p.
- First Fifty Years: Soviet Russia 1917–67, Hodder (1967), 558 p.
- A History of Russia, American Heritage Pub. Co. (1970), 404 p.
- Romanovs, David & Charles PLC (1971), 408 p.
- Boris Godunov, Hodder (1973), 192 p.
- Stalin: Man of History, Weidefeld & Nicolson, (1979), 547 p.
- The Parliamentarians: The History of the Commonwealth Parliamentary Association, 1911–1985, Gower Pub Co (1986), 319 p.
