= Colin Gillies =

- Born: Colin Cuthbert Gillies; 8 October 1912 Oamaru, New Zealand
- Died: 20 June 1996 (aged 83) Timaru, New Zealand
- Weight: 73 kg (161 lb)
- School: Waitaki Boys' High School
- University: University of Otago
- Occupation: Accountant

Rugby union career
- Position: First five-eighth
Provincial / State sides
Years	Team	Apps	(Points)
1931	North Otago		
1932–36	Otago		
International career
Years	Team	Apps	(Points)
1936	NZ Universities		
1936	New Zealand	1	(0)

Colin Cuthbert Gillies (8 October 1912 – 20 June 1996) was a New Zealand rugby union player. A first five-eighth, Gillies represented North Otago and Otago at a provincial level, and was a member of the New Zealand national side, the All Blacks, in 1936. He played two matches for the All Blacks including one international against the touring Australian team.
