= Luther Hirini =

NZ rugby union player (born 1996)

- Born: 27 July 1996 (age 30)
- Height: 1.82 m (6 ft 0 in)
- Weight: 87 kg (192 lb)
- School: Feilding High School

Rugby union career
- Position(s): Wing, Fullback, Centre
Amateur team(s)
Years	Team	Apps	(Points)
- Fielding Old Boys-Oroua
Provincial / State sides
Years	Team	Apps	(Points)
2015–	Manawatu	2	(0)
- Correct as of 9 October 2016

Luther Hirini (born 27 July 1996) is a New Zealand rugby union player. He currently plays for Manawatu in the Mitre 10 Cup. He generally plays in the wing or fullback positions but can also play as a centre.

A product of Feilding High School, Hirini plays for the Feilding Old Boys-Oroua club.

Hirini was involved in the Hurricanes U18 team in 2014.

He was a part of the Manawatu academy in 2015.

He made his provincial debut coming off the bench on 24 September 2016 in the 30–19 loss to Taranaki.

His father, Paul, played as a centre for Horowhenua-Kapiti and Manawatu.
