= Patrick Rhind =

New Zealand rugby player (1915–1996)

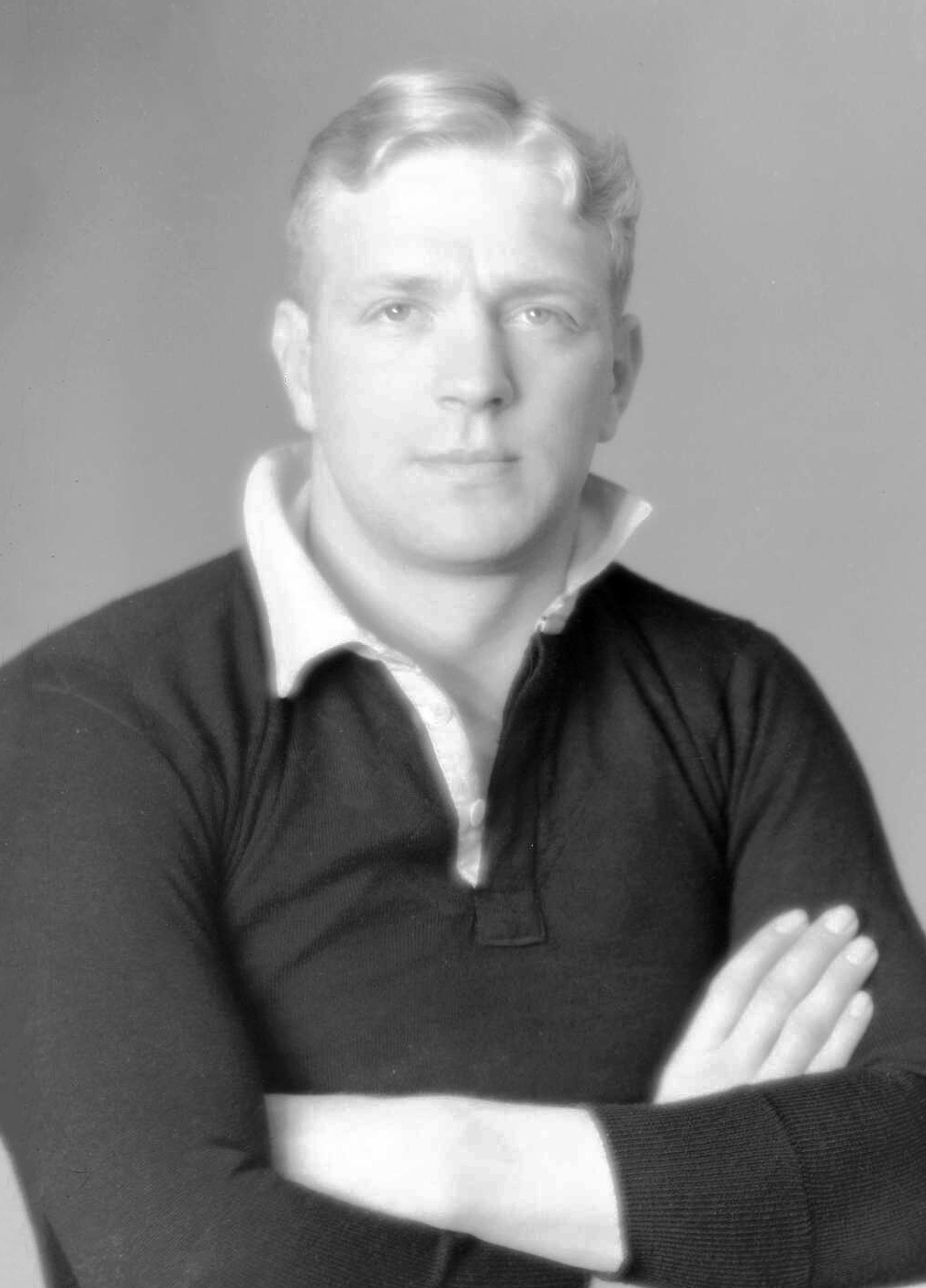
- Rhind in 1946
- Born: Patrick Keith Rhind; 20 June 1915 Lyttelton, New Zealand
- Died: 10 September 1996 (aged 81) Christchurch, New Zealand
- Height: 1.83 m (6 ft 0 in)
- Weight: 93 kg (205 lb)
- School: St Bede's College

Rugby union career
- Position: Prop
Provincial / State sides
Years	Team	Apps	(Points)
1937–47	Canterbury	27	
1947	Wellington	1	
International career
Years	Team	Apps	(Points)
1946	New Zealand	2	(0)

Patrick Keith Rhind (20 June 1915 – 10 September 1996) was a New Zealand rugby union player and coach. A prop, Rhind represented Canterbury and, briefly, Wellington at a provincial level, and was a member of the New Zealand national side, the All Blacks, in 1946. He played two matches for the All Blacks, both of them test matches against the touring Australian team. Together with another former All Black, Pat Vincent, Rhind was selector-coach of the Canterbury team from 1960 to 1962.

Rhind saw active service during World War II. He was commissioned as a second lieutenant in the New Zealand Infantry in August 1940, and was taken prisoner of war in Greece in 1941. Following the end of the war, Rhind was a member of the Second New Zealand Expeditionary Force rugby team, known as the "Kiwis", that toured Britain and France in 1945 and 1946, playing in 22 matches.
