= James Basil Wilkie Roberton =

New Zealand soldier, doctor, historian, writer

James Basil Wilkie Roberton (30 January 1896 – 4 January 1996) was a New Zealand soldier, medical doctor, historian and writer. He was born in Auckland, New Zealand in 1896.
