= Hugh Sew Hoy =

New Zealand businessman and community leader

Hugh Sew Hoy OBE (26 November 1901 – 5 November 1996) was a New Zealand businessman and community leader, and was based in Dunedin. He was born in Guangdong Province, China, in 1901. He was a grandson of early New Zealand entrepreneur Choie Sew Hoy.

In the 1981 Queen's Birthday Honours, Sew Hoy was appointed an Officer of the Order of the British Empire, for services to export and the community.
