= Gabby Westbrook-Patrick =

New Zealand-born Australian model

- Born: Gabrielle Catherine Westbrook-Patrick; 28 January 1996 (age 30); Auckland, New Zealand
- Occupation: Model
- Modeling information
- Height: 175 cm (5 ft 9 in)
- Hair color: Brown
- Eye color: Blue

Gabrielle Catherine Westbrook-Patrick (born 28 January 1996) is a New Zealand-Australian model. She is the first model of Samoan descent to be on a cover of Elle, Harper's Bazaar, and Marie Claire.

== Early life ==
Westbrook was born in Auckland, New Zealand as an only child. Her family moved to Australia when she was two. She is of Samoan, Irish, German, and English descent.

Westbrook started out as a child model but did not officially sign with a major agency until 2012. She grew up in the Paddington area of Sydney and attended Ascham School before moving to New York to pursue an international modeling career.

== Career ==
At the age of 15, Westbrook was discovered by Kathy Ward, owner of Chic Model Management at The Girlfriend Model Search, the same competition that launched Miranda Kerr's career.

In 2013 she was selected to be the face of the L’Oréal Melbourne Fashion Festival. She has been on the cover of magazines such as Elle (Australia), Harper's Bazaar (Turkey), and Marie Claire (Malaysia). Her modeling portfolio includes features in magazines such as Vogue and RUSSH. Westbrook has done advertising campaigns for brands such as Dolce and Gabbana, Armani, Vera Wang, Elizabeth Arden and Elie Saab. She also starred in a Diesel Campaign with actor, Colton Haynes, photographed by Nick Knight (photographer).

On November 7, 2024, Westbrook made $2570 on a poker live stream, presented by the Hustler Casino Live, which featured amateur and poker pros.
