= Beeban McKnight =

New Zealand community leader (1897–1996)

Beeban Annadale McKnight QSM JP (née McDonald; 16 January 1897 – 6 January 1996) was a New Zealand clerical worker, bank teller, dancer, entertainer, cinema operator and community leader. She was born in Dunedin, New Zealand, on 16 January 1897.

In the 1983 New Year Honours, McKnight was awarded the Queen's Service Medal for community service.
