= 1986 Birthday Honours (New Zealand) =

Awards list for New Zealand

The 1986 Queen's Birthday Honours in New Zealand, celebrating the official birthday of Elizabeth II, were appointments made by the Queen in her right as Queen of New Zealand, on the advice of the New Zealand government, to various orders and honours to reward and highlight good works by New Zealanders. They were announced on 14 June 1986.

The recipients of honours are displayed here as they were styled before their new honour.

== Knight Bachelor ==
- Neil Isaac QSO JP – of Christchurch. For services to conservation.
- The Right Honourable (Mr Justice) Ivor Lloyd Morgan Richardson – of Wellington; judge of the Court of Appeal.
- (Lionel) Earl George Richardson JP – of Auckland. For services to manufacturing.

== Order of Saint Michael and Saint George ==
=== Companion (CMG) ===
- Edwin Joseph Keating – of Silverstream. For public and community services.
- Athol Wilson Mann – of Christchurch. For services to the accountancy profession, the arts and community.
- Anthony Joseph Neary – of Wellington. For services to the trade-union movement.

== Order of the British Empire ==
=== Dame Commander (DBE) ===
Civil division

- Vivienne Myra Boyd CBE – of Lower Hutt. For public services.

=== Knight Commander (KBE) ===
Civil division

- The Right Honourable Sir Robin Brunskill Cooke – of Wellington; president of the Court of Appeal.
- Dr Frank William Eden Rutter CBE – of Auckland. For services to the New Zealand Hospital Boards Association and the Auckland Hospital Board.

=== Commander (CBE) ===
Civil division

- Dr Henry Rongomau Bennett QSO – of Rotorua. For services to medicine.
- Dr Edith Ruth Black – of Auckland. For public services.
- Stanley James Callahan – of Wellington; lately Secretary for Justice.
- Leonard Ramsay Castle – of Auckland. For services to pottery.
- Professor Patricia Dorothy Coleman (Lady Sayers) – of Dunedin. For services to home science.
- Dr Thomas Allen Monro Curnow – of Auckland. For services to literature.
- Sister Pauline Frances Engel – of Auckland. For services to education.
- Gavin Leonard Jackson – of Wellington; lately Secretary of Labour.

Military division

- Commodore Kelvin John Lewis OBE – Royal New Zealand Navy.
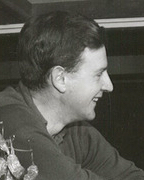
Len Castle

=== Officer (OBE) ===
Civil division

- Frank Brugger – of Wellington. For services to industry, export and the community.
- Leslie Haywood Corkery – of Auckland; lately chief executive, Auckland Hospital Board.
- Graham John Davy – of Auckland. For services to sport.
- Lauris Dorothy Edmond – of Wellington. For services to poetry.
- Donald Alec Hutchings – of Helensville. For services to television and the community.
- Alan Raymond Johnston JP – of Wellington. For services to returned servicemen and the disabled.
- Himiona Te Wahu Kahika – of Ōpōtiki. For services to the Māori people.
- The Right Reverend Monsignor Thomas Joseph Liddy – of Mosgiel. For services to the Catholic Church and the community.
- John Gordon Rhodes Lister – of Auckland. For services to export.
- Stuart Blair McEwen – assistant commissioner, New Zealand Police.
- Alan Franklin McLeod JP – of Wellington. For services to trade-union affairs.
- Peter Macquarie Muller – of Invercargill. For services to journalism.
- Emeritus Professor Hugh Noble Parton – of Christchurch. For services to science and education.
- Professor Thomas Paulay – of Christchurch. For services to civil engineering.
- Professor Alexander Lindsay Rae – of Palmerston North. For services to agriculture.
- Desmond Barry Rich – of Christchurch. For services to the community.
- Basil Peter Farrar Smith – of Auckland. For services to art education.
- Evelyn Margaret Warren – of Christchurch. For services to bowling.

Military division

- Colonel Bruce Meldrum – Colonels' List, New Zealand Army.
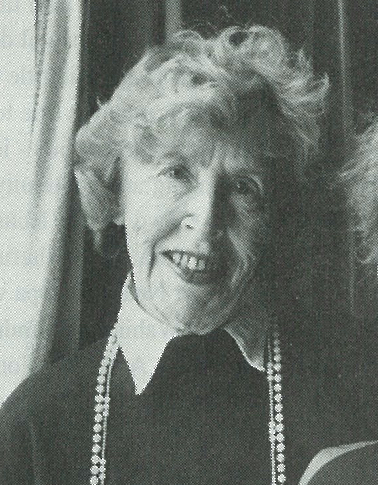
Lauris Edmond

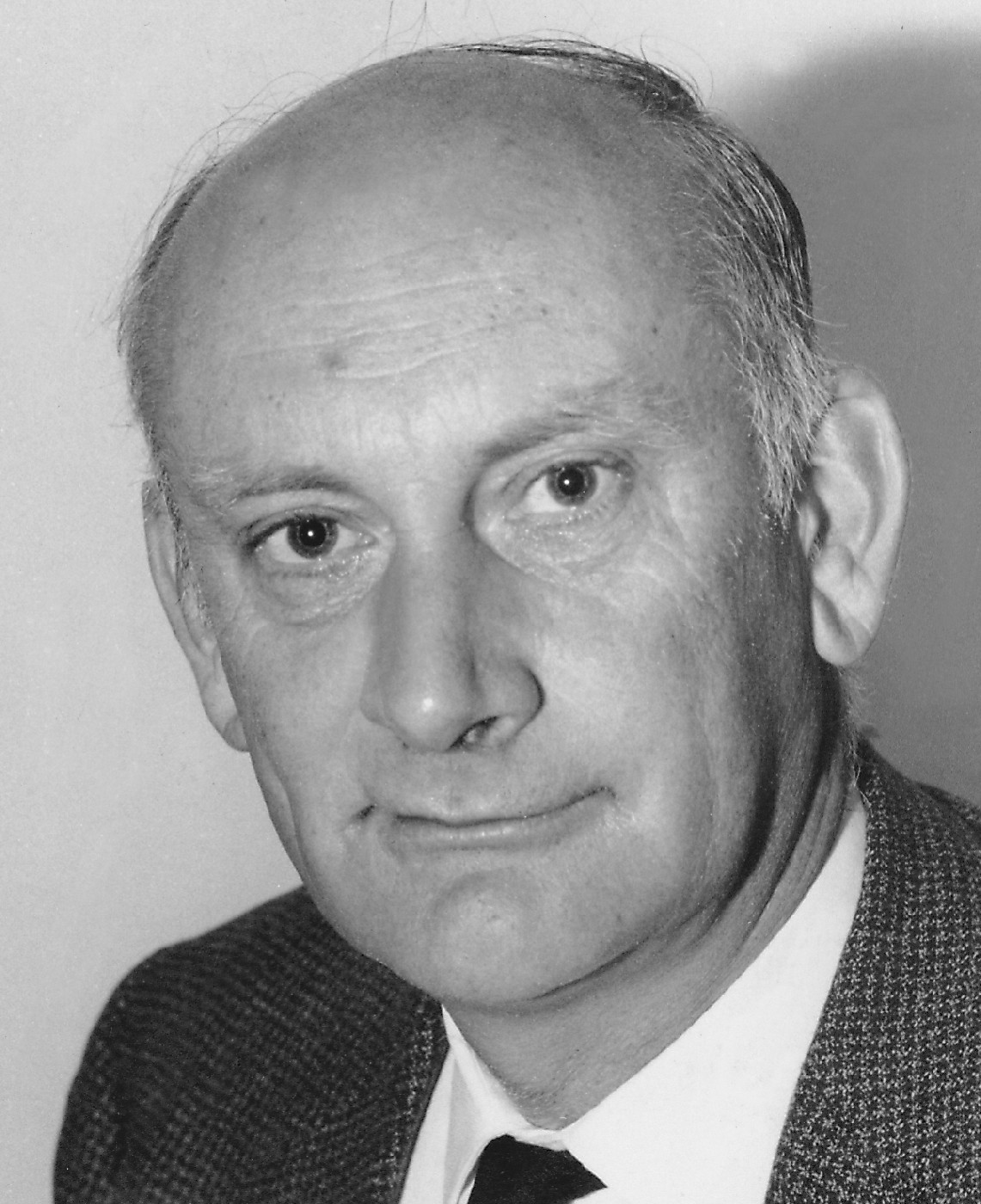
Al Rae

=== Member (MBE) ===
Civil division

- Ernest Albert Barry JP – of Lower Hutt. For services to local government.
- Maurice Ronald Buchan – of Hamilton. For services to bowling.
- Allan Saxon Burns – of Auckland. For services to tennis.
- Robin Nelson Carter – of Masterton. For services to the community.
- Jeremy Vernon Coney – of Wellington. For services to cricket.
- Pettine-Ann Croul (Mrs Edwards) – of Auckland. For services to music.
- Geoffrey Bertrand de Lautour – of Wellington. For services to opera and music.
- Eric William Dempster – of Dunedin. For services to the disabled and cricket.
- John Thomas Diamond – of Auckland. For services to archaeology.
- Dr Zoe Petronella During – of Auckland. For services to the community.
- Brian Alexander McKay Freeman – of Lower Hutt. For services to the meat export industry.
- Brian Dudley Gargiulo – of Christchurch. For services to horticulture.
- Colin Graham – lately chief inspector, New Zealand Police.
- James Richard Green – of Dunedin. For services to the Royal New Zealand Society for the Prevention of Cruelty to Animals and the community.
- John Lawrence Henderson JP – of Auckland. For services to local government.
- Kevin Leslie Jarrett – of Wanganui. For services to brass bands.
- Ngaire Effie Olive Johnston – of Christchurch. For services to Lifeline and the community.
- Christopher John Robert McCorquindale JP – of Auckland. For services to local-body and community affairs.
- Elsie Muriel McKay JP – of Greymouth. For services to the community.
- Walter Robert Hugh Martin ED – of Auckland. For services to education.
- Alister Miller – of Christchurch. For services to Highland piping and dancing.
- Alexander Milne – of Whakatāne; chief technologist, Bay of Plenty Hospital Board.
- John Nelson Morris – of Napier. For services to education.
- Harold William Nelson – of Nelson. For services to athletics.
- John Gordon Power – of Christchurch. For services to sport and the community.
- Professor Desmond Branson Sawyer – of Wānaka. For services to mathematics.
- Stuart Keith Spry – of Wellington. For services to local-body and community affairs.
- Maurice Fleming Woods – of Taupō. For services to the community.

Military division

- Lieutenant Commander Michael David Lloyd – Royal New Zealand Navy.
- Captain Barry James Knowles – Corps of Royal New Zealand Engineers.
- Major Michael Whitmore Thornton – Royal Regiment of New Zealand Artillery (Territorial Force).
- Squadron Leader Kenneth Charles McKenzie Williams – Royal New Zealand Air Force.
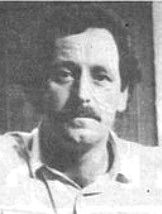
Jeremy Coney

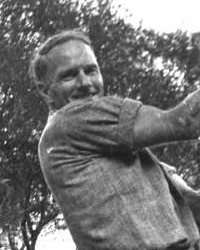
Jack Diamond

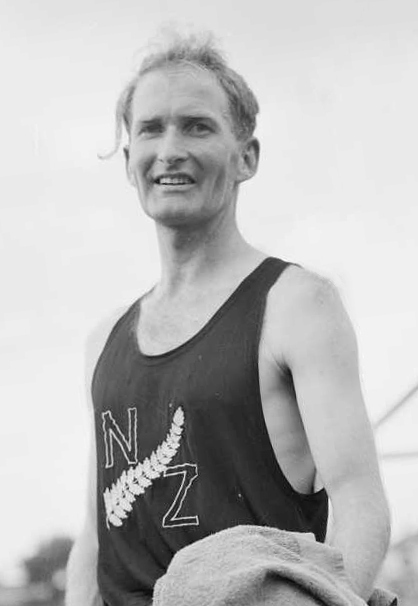
Harold Nelson

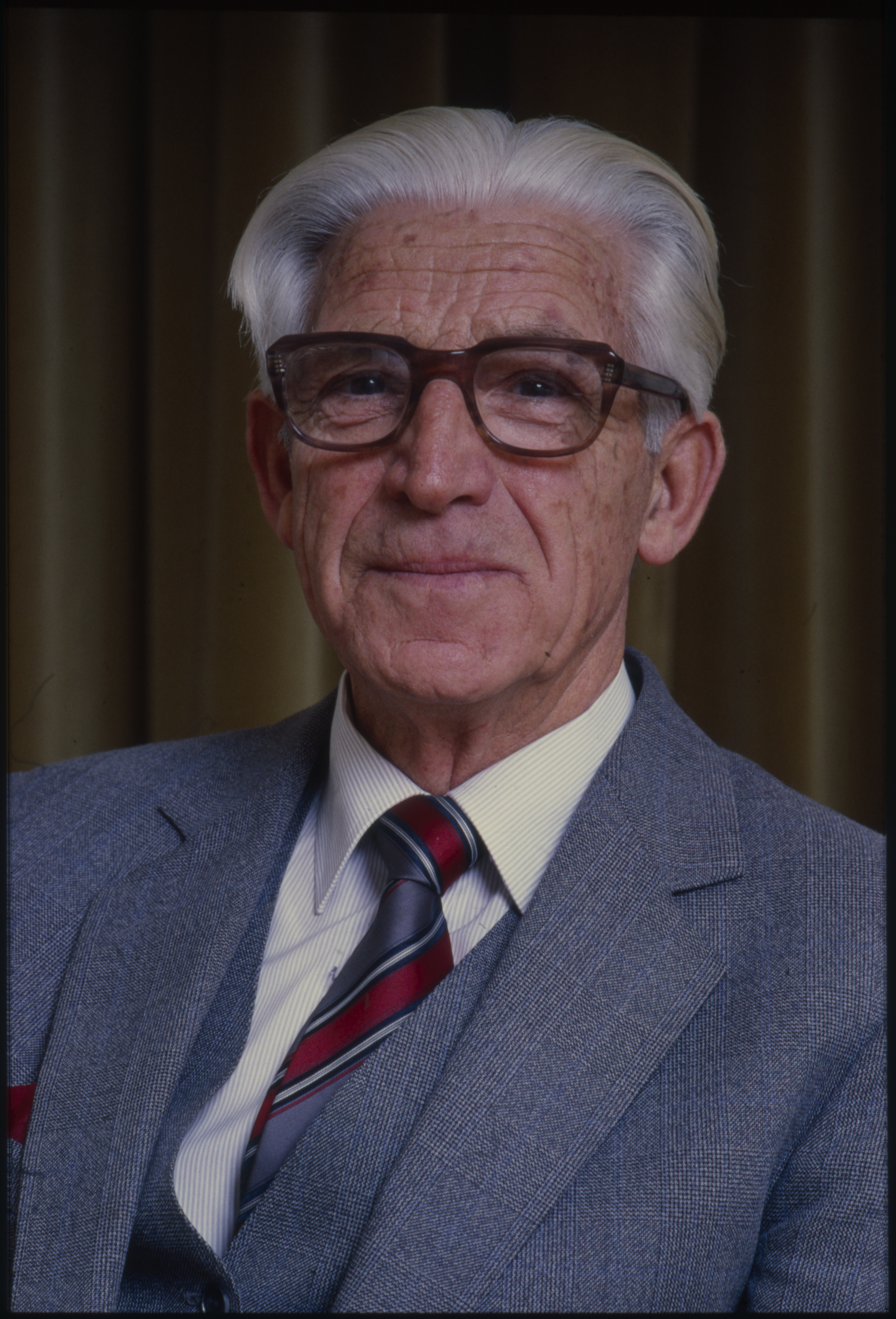
Keith Spry

== British Empire Medal (BEM) ==
Military division

- Chief Petty Officer Stephen Perry – Royal New Zealand Naval Volunteer Reserve.
- Sergeant William Tutawhaio Ormsby – Royal Regiment of New Zealand Artillery (Territorial Force).
- Staff Sergeant Sotia Ponijiasi – New Zealand Special Air Service.
- Warrant Officer Class II William Ernest Rawiri – Royal New Zealand Infantry Regiment.
- Flight Sergeant Patrick John Johnson – Royal New Zealand Air Force.
- Flight Sergeant Kevin Edward Whiteside – Royal New Zealand Air Force.

== Companion of the Queen's Service Order (QSO) ==
=== For community service ===
- Mary Katrine Brown MBE JP – of Christchurch.
- Mary Ena Burgess – of Whangārei.
- The Reverend Leslie Colin Clements – of Auckland.
- lain Watson Gallaway MBE – of Dunedin.
- Christine Blair Staniforth – of Christchurch.
- Elsie Kathleen May Walker – of Whakatāne.

=== For public services ===
- Marion Edna Bruce – of Porirua.
- Kenneth Harold James Headifen – of Nelson; lately District Court judge.
- Dr James Vincent Hodge – of Auckland; director, Medical Research Council of New Zealand.
- Fanaura Kimiora Kingstone – of Tokoroa.
- Vincent Patrick McGlone – of Wellington; chairman, Special Public Service Appeal Board.
- Professor John Edward Morton – of Auckland.

== Queen's Service Medal (QSM) ==
=== For community service ===
- Geoffrey Ralph Bonallack – of Wellington.
- Lyn Cassidy – of Wellington.
- James Cullen – of Auckland.
- Edwin Robert John Daniel JP – of Wellington.
- Margaret Corsie Flighty – of Lower Hutt.
- Janet Mary Flood-Smith – of Waimate.
- Marjorie Gillian Hall – of Kaiapoi.
- Patricia Clapin, Lady Harris – of Waikanae.
- Witarina Te Miriarangi Parewahaika Harris – of Rotorua.
- Carole Ada Hendry JP – of Dunedin.
- Thomas Stanley Johnson – of Upper Hutt.
- Osborne Idwell Jones – of Auckland.
- Russell Ian Kerr – of Christchurch.
- Lyndsey Alison Leask – of Christchurch.
- Joan Margaret Mattingley JP – of Wellington.
- Jean Almond Maynard – of Palmerston North.
- James Ronald Millar – of Christchurch.
- Patrick Michael Mulcahy – of Christchurch.
- Ronald Ng-Waishing – of Pukekohe.
- Captain Edward Parsons – of Auckland.
- Hoana Rapatini – of Kaikohe.
- Hugh Beynon Redgrove – of Auckland.
- Bathie Stuart – of Laguna Beach, California, United States.
- Tokorua Barney Te Kani – of Gisborne.
- Alan Frank Thomas – of Nelson.
- Tanuyasa James Alfred Yandall – of Auckland.

=== For public services ===
- Walter Bright Ashford JP – of Ashburton.
- Hugh Aiton Aitken Baird – of Hastings.
- Phyllis May Brown – of Wanganui.
- Raymond Martin Carter – lately senior constable, New Zealand Police.
- Tala Cleverley JP – of Wellington.
- Anthony Paul Laing Cunningham – senior constable, New Zealand Police.
- Glynn Douglas Cuthbert – sergeant, New Zealand Police.
- Francis Joseph Fee – sergeant, New Zealand Police.
- Marion Murray (Peg) Fellowes JP – of Auckland.
- David Boyd Foote JP – of Tokoroa.
- John Frederick Howard Grylls – of Te Awamutu.
- Ross Talbot Harris – of Wellington.
- Peter Arthur Hoskins – of Christchurch.
- Witi Tame Ihimaera Smiler – of New York, United States.
- Owen Trevor Jones – of Wellington.
- Fa'afua Savelina Laban – of Auckland.
- Ewen Sneddon (Snow) Lupton – of Waverley.
- Margaret Ruth McNeur – of Dunedin; lately supervising nurse, paediatric services, Dunedin Hospital, Otago Hospital Board.
- John Little Meney – of Hamilton.
- Teupokoina (Poko) Morgan – of Tokoroa.
- Ronald Angus Proctor – of Christchurch.
- Powell Montagu Robinson – of Napier.
- Gilbert Simpson – of Christchurch.
- Robert Henry Stott – of Wellington.
- John Russell Francis Von Tunzelman – of Te Anau.
- Lubo Joseph Yelavich JP – of Auckland.
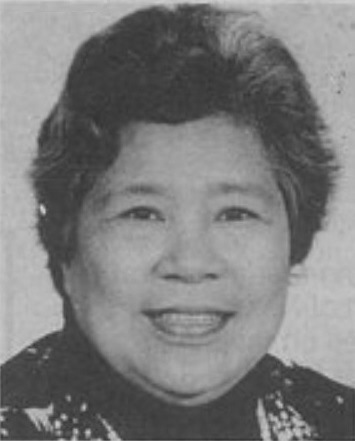
Tala Cleverley

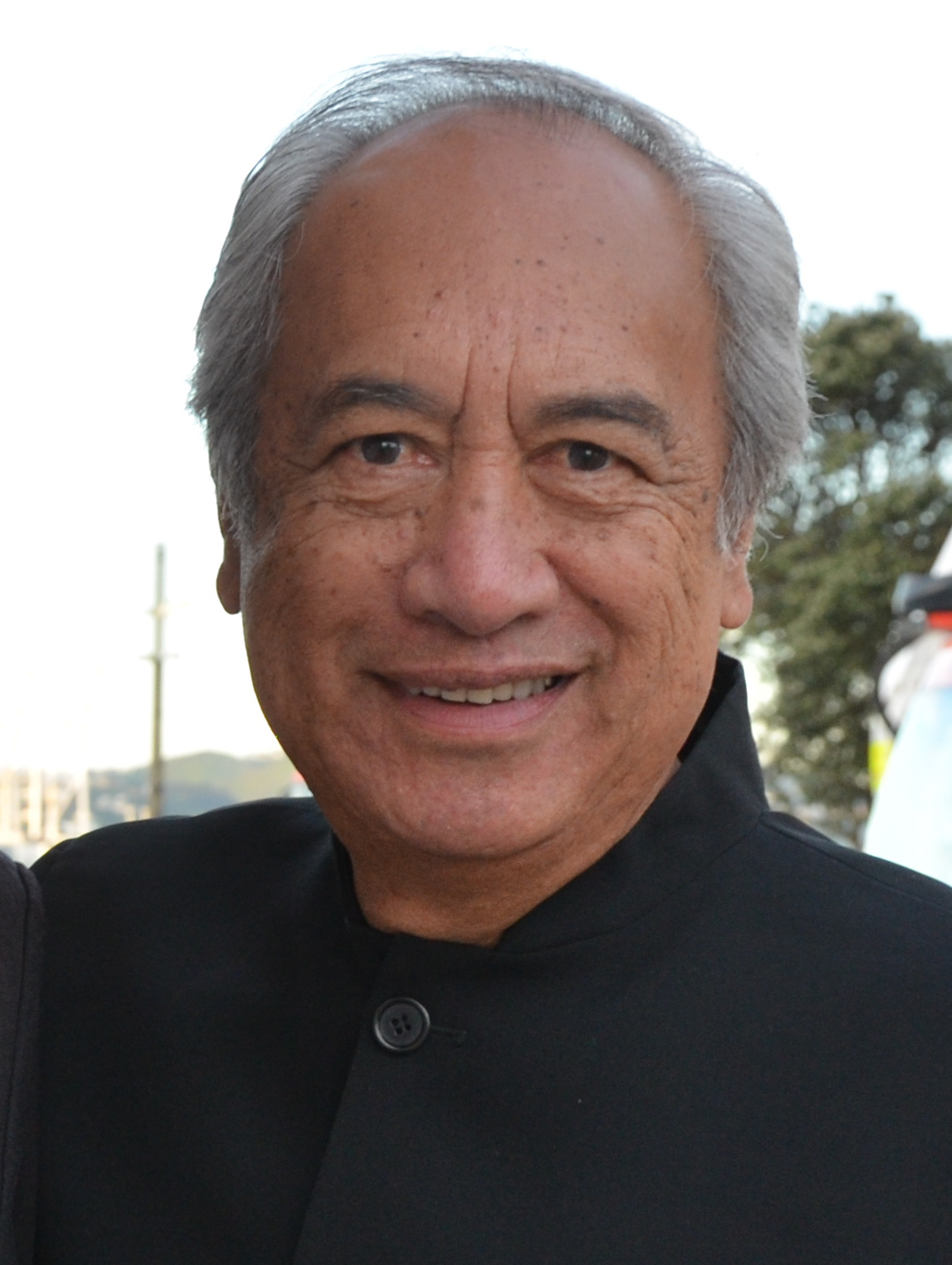
Witi Ihimaera

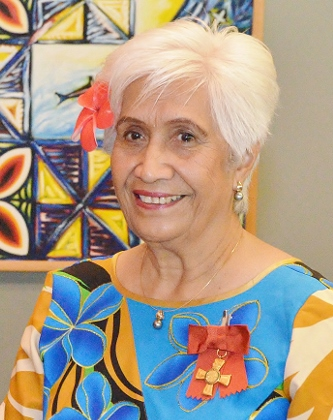
Fa'afua Laban

== Royal Red Cross ==
=== Associate (ARRC) ===
- Major Ellen Verdon Wallace – Royal New Zealand Nursing Corps.

== Queen's Fire Service Medal (QFSM) ==
- Cedric Adrian Baker Clemas – station officer, Masterton Volunteer Fire Brigade, New Zealand Fire Service.
- Tom Johnston – chief fire officer, Titirangi Volunteer Fire Brigade, New Zealand Fire Service.
- Paul Anthony McQuillan – fire commander, 5B Area, Nelson, New Zealand Fire Service.

== Queen's Police Medal (QPM) ==
- William Allan Reid Galbraith – detective superintendent, New Zealand Police.
- Roger George Emery Winter – inspector, New Zealand Police.

== Air Force Cross (AFC) ==
- Wing Commander James Stanley Barclay – Royal New Zealand Air Force.

== Queen's Commendation for Valuable Service in the Air ==
- Flight Lieutenant Roger Gordon Read – Royal New Zealand Air Force.
