= Graham Davy =

New Zealand athlete and sports administrator (1936–2018)

Graham Davey OBE
Personal information
- Born: 4 October 1936 Auckland, New Zealand
- Died: 18 June 2018 (aged 81) Auckland, New Zealand
- Occupation: Accountant
- Spouse: Janette Catherine McKenzie (m. 1960)

Sport
- Country: New Zealand
- Sport: Track and field

Achievements and titles
- National finals: 100 yards champion (1960)

Graham John Davy OBE (4 October 1936 – 18 June 2018) was a New Zealand athlete and sports administrator. He won one national athletics title, and served as the chair of directors of the New Zealand Sports Foundation.

== Biography ==
Born in the Auckland suburb of Herne Bay on 4 October 1936, Davy was the son of John Baxter Davy and Georgiana Alleyne Davy (née Litchfield). He was educated at Auckland Grammar School, and went on to study at Auckland University College and Seddon Memorial Technical College, qualifying as an accountant.

In 1960, Davy married Janette Catherine McKenzie, and the couple went on to have three children.

As an athlete, Davy won the New Zealand national 100 yards title representing Auckland in 1960, with a time of 9.6 seconds.

Davy served as secretary of the Auckland Amateur Athletic Association, and in that role in 1972 he helped Arthur Lydiard get a job with Winstone Ltd that enabled Lydiard to assist athletes and coaches throughout New Zealand. The same year, Davy was the athletics team manager for the New Zealand team at the 1972 Olympic Games in Munich. He was involved in the formation of the New Zealand Sports Foundation in 1979, and served as a director and chair of the directorate of that body. In 1981, he became the inaugural president of the Pacific Conference Games Federation. He was the director of athletics at the 1990 Commonwealth Games, held in Auckland.

Davy died on 18 June 2018.

== Honours and awards ==
Davy was awarded the Queen Elizabeth II Silver Jubilee Medal in 1977, and the New Zealand 1990 Commemoration Medal.

In the 1986 Queen's Birthday Honours, Davy was appointed an Officer of the Order of the British Empire, for services to sport. He was also a life member of Athletics Auckland.
