= Peter Molan =

New Zealand biochemist (1943–2015)

Peter Molan MBE
- Born: Peter Charles Molan; 20 October 1943; Cardiff, Wales
- Died: 16 September 2015 (aged 71); Hamilton, New Zealand
- Education: University of Liverpool
- Spouses: 1.; Winifred Ruth Whitcomb (m. 1963; died 1991): 2. Alyson Molan
- Scientific career
- Fields: Biochemistry
- Workplaces: University of Waikato
- Thesis: Respirometric studies of the metabolism occurring in saliva (1969)
- Website: www.petermolan.com

Peter Charles Molan MBE (20 October 1943 – 16 September 2015) was a New Zealand biochemist, noted for his elucidation of the medicinal properties of mānuka honey.

== Early life and family ==
Born in Cardiff, Wales, on 20 October 1943, Molan was the son of Vera Molan (née Boswell) and her husband Charles Molan. In 1963 Molan married Winifred Ruth Whitcomb in Cardiff. They migrated to New Zealand with their four children in 1973, and became naturalised New Zealanders in 1977. Ruth Molan died in 1991, and Molan later remarried.

== Academic and research career ==
Molan studied at the University of Wales, graduating with a Bachelor of Science with honours in biochemistry in 1965. He then undertook doctoral research at the University of Liverpool, where he awarded a PhD in dental science in 1969. His thesis was entitled Respirometric studies of the metabolism occurring in saliva. A lecturer in dental science at Liverpool from 1968 to 1973, he took up a lectureship at the University of Waikato in Hamilton in 1973, and established the first biochemistry course at that institution. He rose to the position of professor of biological sciences (2003), and was the director of the Honey Research Unit at Waikato from 1995 until 2013. He retired from the University of Waikato in 2014.

In 1981 Molan began to investigate the antiseptic properties of mānuka honey. His research identified that mānuka honey has significant non-peroxide antimicrobial activity. He went on to establish a grading system, known as the "Molan Gold Standard", for the quality of mānuka honey, based on the honey's methylglyoxal content. He also investigated the use of honey as an aid to the healing of wounds.

Over his career Molan wrote or co-wrote over 90 refereed scientific papers and seven book chapters, and gave over 60 conference presentations. He was co-editor of two books on the use of honey for wound management, was awarded several patents, and wrote numerous magazine and newspaper articles.

== Awards and honours ==
In the 1995 Queen's Birthday Honours, Molan was appointed a Member of the Order of the British Empire, for services to the honey industry. In 2001 he was awarded a New Zealand Science and Technology silver medal by the Royal Society of New Zealand, for "revolutionising the New Zealand honey industry and adding significantly to the value of their product." He was twice honoured at the KuDos Hamilton Science Excellence Awards, receiving the inaugural science entrepreneur award in 2007, and a lifetime achievement award in 2013.

== Death ==
Molan died from cancer at his home in Hamilton on 16 September 2015.
