= Carmel College, Auckland =

State-integrated secondary school in Auckland, New Zealand

Carmel College

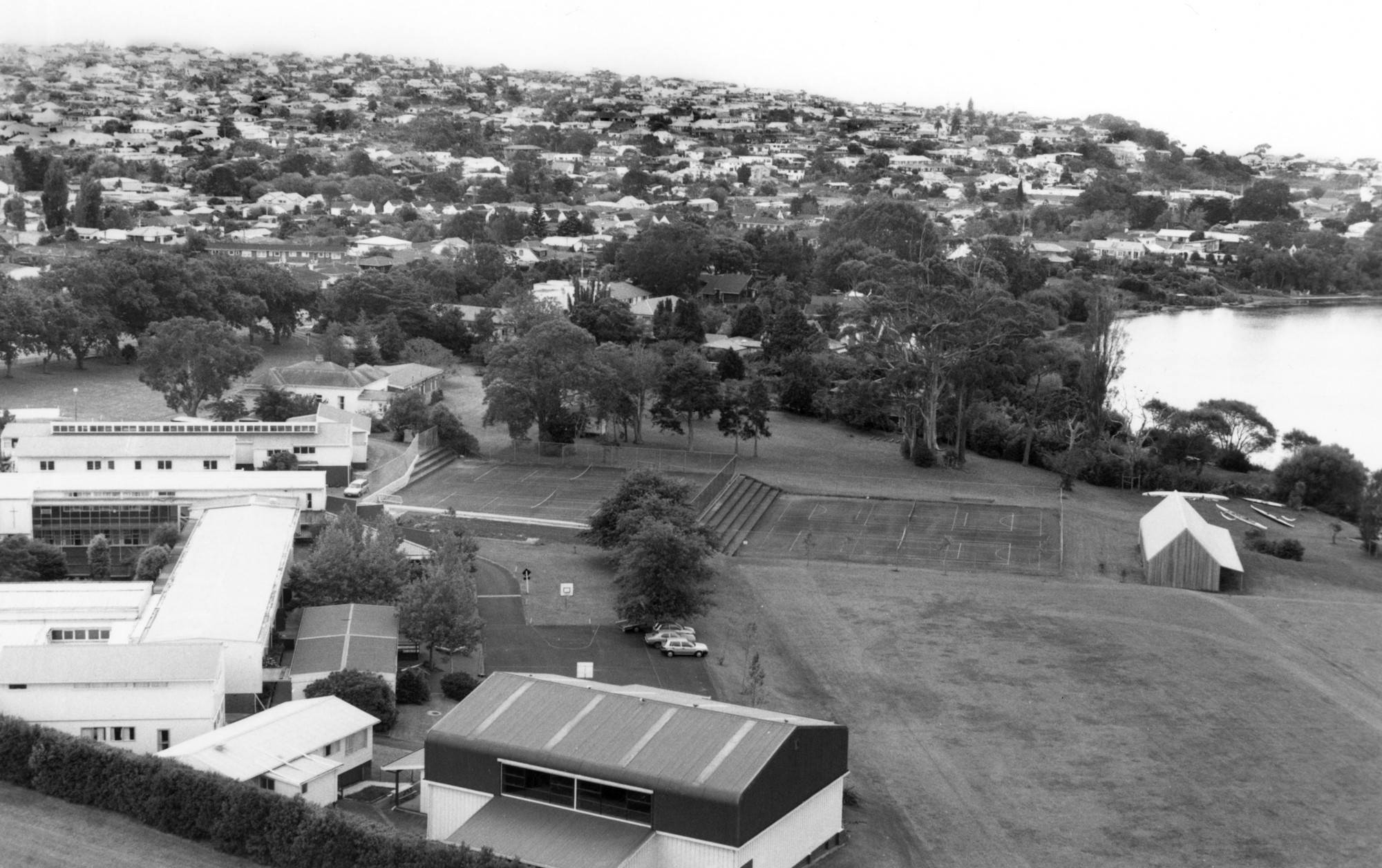
- Carmel College and Lake Pupuke seen from North Shore Hospital (1997)

Location
- 108 Shakespeare Road, Milford, Auckland, New Zealand; 36.7792°S 174.7573°E

Information
- Type: Integrated single sex-girls Secondary (Year 7–13)
- Motto: 'Act justly, love tenderly, walk humbly with your God'
- Established: 1957; 69 years ago
- Ministry of Education Institution no.: 35
- Principal: Sarah Kemble
- Enrolment: 1,100 (July 2026)
- Socio-economic decile: 9Q
- Website: carmel.school.nz

Carmel College is a Catholic secondary school for girls located in Milford on Auckland's North Shore. It was established by the Sisters of Mercy in 1957 starting with a student roll of only 15 girls. The College's brother school is nearby Rosmini College.

== Location ==
Carmel College is situated on the northern shore of Lake Pupuke.

== History ==
The school was established in 1957 by the Sisters of Mercy. Sister Mary Justine Gillies was given the mission of founding Carmel College on donated land, initially with 15 students and no actual classrooms. Sister Justine gathered dedicated teaching Sisters and, as the school grew, these Sisters were joined by the first full-time lay teacher, Verena Butler, in 1963.

Under Sister Pauline Engel, the third principal of the College, who was appointed in 1983, the college undertook an programme of building, expanding and refurbishing. This included building a gymnasium, a food and technology block, an arts block, and the refurbishment of the science laboratories.

On 19 June 2013, Bishop Patrick Dunn and the mayor of Auckland, Len Brown, opened the Harkins Building, which included a classroom block to accommodate music, drama, information technology and social sciences, a performing arts centre seating 160, a covered atrium providing break-out teaching and social spaces, and a new library overlooking Lake Pupuke.

== Enrolment ==
As of July 2026, the school has a roll of 1,100 students, of which 74 (6.7%) identify as Māori.

As of 2026, the school has an Equity Index of 382, placing it amongst schools whose students have the fewest socioeconomic barriers to achievement (roughly equivalent to deciles 9 and 10 under the former socio-economic decile system).

== School activities ==
Carmel College students take part in a range of activities throughout New Zealand including Stage Challenge, Big Sing Choral Festival, Filo Night, and Polyfest. The school has a number of clubs, including the Human Rights Group, Creative Writers' Club, Students Against Driving Drunk (SADD), Young Vinnies and the SAVE environmental group. Carmel has different music groups such as the Carmel College Orchestra, the Carmel College Jazz Band, and Chamber groups.

== Notable alumnae ==
- Tania Dalton, netballer
- Rebecca Dubber, swimmer, Paralympic bronze medallist
- Barbara Edmonds, politician
- Teneale Hatton, canoeist
- Fiona McDonald, singer
- Shai Navot, leader of The Opportunities Party, lawyer, crown prosecutor
- Randa, AKA LarzRanda rapper & recording artist
- Jodie Rimmer, actress
