= Pauline Engel =

New Zealander Catholic nun

Dame Sister Pauline Engel DBE RSM
- Vicar for Education of the Diocese of Auckland

Personal details
- Born: 10 September 1930 Waimea West, New Zealand
- Died: 15 November 2017 (aged 87) Takapuna, New Zealand
- Buried: Waikaraka Cemetery
- Denomination: Roman Catholic
- Parents: John Engel; Eileen Engel
- Occupation: nun, school administrator

Dame Sister Pauline Frances Engel DBE RSM (10 September 1930 – 15 November 2017) was a New Zealand educator and Roman Catholic religious sister. A member of the Sisters of Mercy, she served as the third principal of Carmel College. Prior to running Carmel College, she taught English, religious studies, history, and geography. She actively opposed capital punishment and assisted suicide in New Zealand, and was a critic of apartheid in South Africa. After retiring, Engel was appointed as the Vicar for Education in the Diocese of Auckland. She was made a Commander of the Order of the British Empire in the 1986 Queen's Birthday Honours and a Dame Commander of the Order of the British Empire in the 1995 Queen's Birthday Honours for her services to education in New Zealand.

== Biography ==
Born in 1930 in Waimea West to Roman Catholic parents, John and Eileen Engel, she was one of five siblings. A sister in the Sisters of Mercy, Nga Whaea Atawhai o Aotearoa, she became an educator. In 1983, she became the third principal of Carmel College. She was the first principal to be appointed by Carmel College's Board of Governors. Engel taught history, English, geography, and religious studies at Carmel College from 1965 to 1983. After retiring, she was appointed as the Vicar for Education for the Diocese of Auckland.

In the 1995 Queen's Birthday Honours, Engel was appointed a Dame Commander of the Order of the British Empire, for services to education, having been made a Commander of the same order in the 1986 Queen's Birthday Honours.

Engel worked with the Ministry of Justice and wrote a history of the abolition of capital punishment in New Zealand, prior to entering religious life.

At the age of 85, Engel submitted an opposition to the introduction of assisted suicide to the Parliamentary Health Committee. A critic of apartheid in South Africa, she opposed the 1981 Springbok Tour and was among the religious leaders who actively opposed rugby matches in Auckland.

Engel died at North Shore Hospital, Takapuna on 15 November 2017, aged 87. At the time of her death, she was one of the last two nuns to live at the convent at Carmel College. A requiem mass for Engel was held at St. Joseph's Catholic Church in Takapuna on 20 November 2017. She was buried at Waikaraka Cemetery.
