= Pat Goodman =

New Zealand businessman, arts patron and philanthropist

Sir Pat Goodman GNZM CBE
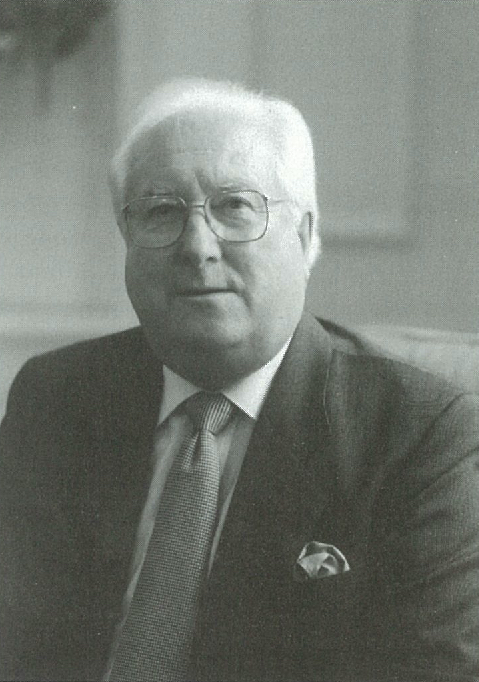
- Goodman in 1999
- Born: Patrick Ledger Goodman; 6 April 1929; Motueka, New Zealand
- Died: 9 September 2017 (aged 88); Motueka, New Zealand
- Occupation: Businessman
- Known for: Goodman Fielder

Sir Patrick Ledger Goodman GNZM CBE (6 April 1929 – 9 September 2017), known as Pat Goodman or Sir Pat Goodman, was a prominent New Zealand businessman, arts patron and philanthropist. Along with his brother, Peter, he co-founded the Australasian food giant Goodman Fielder. He was CEO and chairman of the company.

Goodman was made a Commander of the Order of the British Empire, for services to business management and the community, in the 1990 New Year Honours. In the 1995 Queen's Birthday Honours, he was appointed a Knight Bachelor, for services to business management, export and the community. In the 2002 Queen's Birthday and Golden Jubilee Honours, Goodman was appointed a Principal Companion of the New Zealand Order of Merit, for services to business, the arts and the community. In 2009, following the restoration of titular honours by the New Zealand government, he accepted redesignation as a Knight Grand Companion of the New Zealand Order of Merit.

In 2005, Goodman was inducted into the New Zealand Business Hall of Fame.

Goodman died at his home in Motueka on 9 September 2017.
