= Morva Croxson =

New Zealand music therapist and university chancellor

Morva Croxson CBE
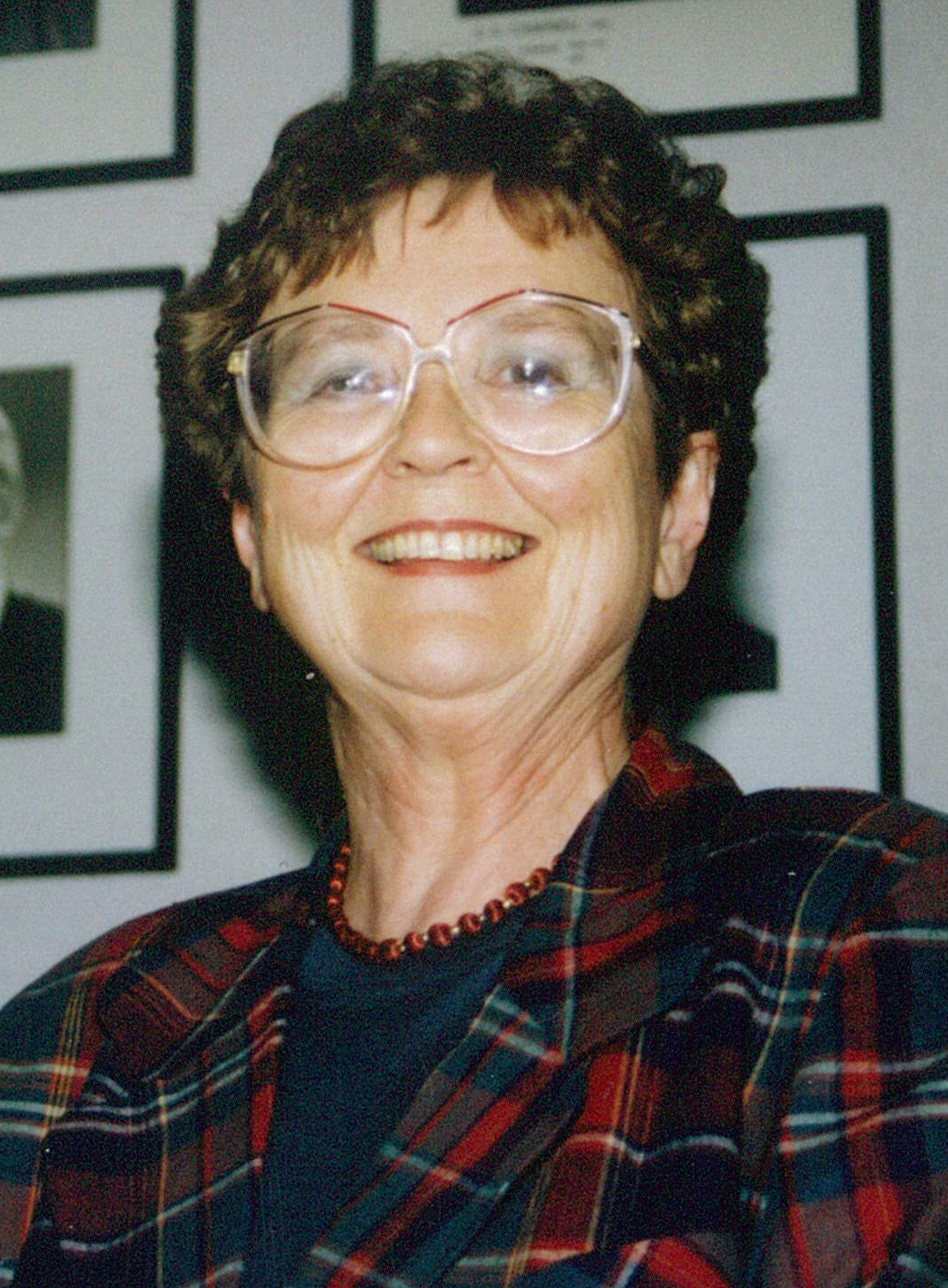
- Croxson in 1997

8th Chancellor of Massey University
- In office 1998–2002
- Preceded by: Hugh Williams
- Succeeded by: Nigel Gould

Personal details
- Born: 1934 (age 91–92)

Academic background
- Education: University of Auckland (BMus); Massey University (MPhil)
- Thesis: The effect of music therapy on motor control of cerebral palsied children (1988)

Academic work
- Institutions: Massey University

Morva Olwyn Croxson CBE (née Jones; born 1934) is a New Zealand music therapist. She was the first woman to serve as chancellor of Massey University.

== Education and career ==
Croxson was born in 1934, and was educated at Otago Girls' High School and St Dominic's College in Dunedin. She went on to study at the University of Otago, Victoria University of Wellington and the University of Auckland, graduating from the latter with a Bachelor of Music degree in 1965. She earned a Diploma of Teaching in 1979, and graduated from Massey University in 1988 with a Master of Philosophy in education for her thesis titled The effect of music therapy on motor control of cerebral palsied children.

To celebrate the centenary of women's suffrage in New Zealand, Croxson was selected as one of eight women to give graduation addresses at Massey University in 1993.

In 1997, she was the first woman to be appointed chancellor of Massey University. She served in that role from 1998 to 2002.

== Honours and awards ==
In the 1995 Queen's Birthday Honours, Croxson was appointed a Commander of the Order of the British Empire, for services to arts and the community. She was made a life member of Music Therapy New Zealand in 1999. In 2003, she was awarded a Doctor of Literature (honoris causa) by Massey University.
