= Lyndsey Leask =

New Zealand softball administrator (1935–2021)

Lyndsey Leask QSM
- Born: Lyndsey Alison Leask; 4 October 1935; Ashburton, New Zealand
- Died: 2 December 2021 (aged 86)
- Occupation: Schoolteacher
- Known for: First female president of Softball New Zealand

Lyndsey Alison Leask QSM (4 October 1935 – 2 December 2021) was a New Zealand softball player, coach and administrator. She was manager of the New Zealand women's team at two world championship tournaments, in 1978 and 1982, and was the first woman to serve as president of the New Zealand Softball Association (now Softball New Zealand) from 1993 to 1997.

== Biography ==
Leask was born in Ashburton on 4 October 1935, the daughter of Alison and James Leask, and educated at Papanui High School in Christchurch. She went on to study at Christchurch Teachers' College.

Leask represented Canterbury in softball as an outfielder, and was a member of the Monowai club team that won seven national titles between 1959 and 1968. She later became coach of the Canterbury team, winning the national provincial title in 1982. A teacher at Burnside High School in Christchurch, Leask founded the Burnside softball club with Gavin Britt in 1972.

In 1968, Leask was elected to the council of the New Zealand Softball Association (NZSA), and she became vice president in 1983. After 10 years in that role, she became president of the NZSA in 1993, the first woman to serve in that capacity. When the NZSA was restructured as Softball New Zealand (SNZ), with a board headed by a chairperson, in 1996, Leask remained as ceremonial president until serving as patron of SNZ from 1997 to 2001.

Leask had her first involvement with the management of the New Zealand national women's softball team in 1973, when she was the team's publicity officer. The following year, she was the assistant manager of the team at the 1974 ISF Women's World Championships, and she became the team manager in 1977. Leask was manager of the team at two ISF Women's World Championships: in 1978 where they finished third; and in 1982 where they won the tournament. She was New Zealand delegate to the International Softball Federation congress on five occasions, and was a member of the technical committee for the inaugural Olympic softball tournament at Atlanta in 1996.

In the 1986 Queen's Birthday Honours, Leask was awarded the Queen's Service Medal for community service. In 1999, she was elected to the International Softball Federation Hall of Fame, and in 2016, she was inducted into the Softball New Zealand Hall of Fame.

Leask died on 2 December 2021.
