= Papanui High School =

Location
- 30 Langdons Road; Canterbury; Christchurch; New Zealand; 43°29′29″S 172°36′25″E

Information
- School type: State co-educational secondary (Year 9–13)
- Motto: Latin: In Opere Felicitas ("Success Through Work")
- Established: 1936
- Ministry of Education Institution no.: 316
- Chairperson: Alison Arrow
- Principal: Robert Gilbert
- Enrolment: 1,416 (July 2026)
- Average class size: 28.5
- Campus type: Suburban
- Houses: Pīwakawaka, Kōtare, Kererū, Weka and Makomako (as of May 2024)
- Colours: Navy blue Green
- Socio-economic decile: 7O
- Website: papanui.school.nz

Papanui High School (PHS) is a co-educational state secondary school located in Papanui, Christchurch, New Zealand. It is situated on Langdons Road, in a rapidly growing commercial area. It was formerly bounded by Northlands Mall, and Firestone.

== Attendance ==
As of Term 1, 2024, all year groups except Year 9 have 'moderate absence' according to Ministry of Education standards.

Years 10, 11, 12, and 13 less than 80% of students 'regularly attending' (attending more than 90% of the school term) with respective percentages of 76, 78, 78, and 75. Year 9s have the highest number, with 87% of them in regular attendance.

== History ==
The school opened as Papanui Technical College in 1936 with an informal opening on 26 May 1936, and an official opening in September 1936. It operated under the control of the Christchurch Technical College. The first principal of the school was Joseph Bell McBride. In the late 1940s educational changes transferred the control of the technical colleges from the Technical College boards to new school boards. The school continued to be known as the Papanui Technical High School. Debate about the name of the school led to a name change to Papanui High School in 1954.

== 2011 earthquake ==
In 2011 a new community and school shared gymnasium and pool complex was introduced to the school's campus. It was opened in association with Christchurch City Council and was named in honour of Paralympian Graham Condon.

Papanui High School site-shared with Shirley Boys' High School for 26 weeks following the 2011 earthquake.

It is the fourth largest school in Christchurch with a roll of 1,416 students in July 2026. The standard school pathway follows the NCEA (National Certificate of Education Achievement) curriculum with many subjects ranging from sciences such as Biology and Physics, to arts and history subjects such as photography and geography. The school also features the Kimi Ora department, a unit of the school designed in aiding and schooling students with an intellectual or behavioural disability, with each Kimi Ora student working on their individual education program designed with assistance from the family, specialists, and the teaching staff.

== Enrolment ==
As of July 2026, Papanui High School has roll of 1,416 students, of which 251 (17.7%) identify as Māori.

As of 2026, the school has an Equity Index of 461, placing it amongst schools whose students have average socioeconomic barriers to achievement (roughly equivalent to deciles 5 and 6 under the former socio-economic decile system).

== Notable alumni ==
- Shane Bond – cricketer
- Taylor Britt – basketball player
- Lewis Brown – rugby league player
- Andy Caddick – cricketer
- David Grundy – hockey player, Olympian 619
- Michael Hurst – actor, director and writer
- Lyndsey Leask – softball player
- Gilbert Myles – former politician
- George Naoupu – rugby union player
- Mark Priest – cricketer
- Melodie Robinson – rugby union player

== Sources ==
- Jennings, Sheeril; Jennings, Ryan L. (2018). Proof of War: The Gallipoli Photo Album. UMprint Publishing. ISBN 978-0-473-43911-8.
- Chalklen, M. F., & Papanui High School Old Students' Association. (1986). The school at the terminus: A jubilee history of Papanui High School, 1936-1986. Papanui High School Old Students' Association.
