= 1995 Birthday Honours (New Zealand) =

Awards list for New Zealand

The 1995 Queen's Birthday Honours in New Zealand, celebrating the official birthday of Elizabeth II, were appointments made by the Queen in her right as Queen of New Zealand, on the advice of the New Zealand government, to various orders and honours to reward and highlight good works by New Zealanders. They were announced on 17 June 1995.

The recipients of honours are displayed here as they were styled before their new honour.

== Order of New Zealand (ONZ) ==
Ordinary member

- Sir Roy Allan McKenzie KBE – of Eastbourne.
- Dame Kiri Janette Te Kanawa DBE AC – of Surrey, United Kingdom.
- Sir (Frederick) Miles Warren KBE – of Governors Bay.
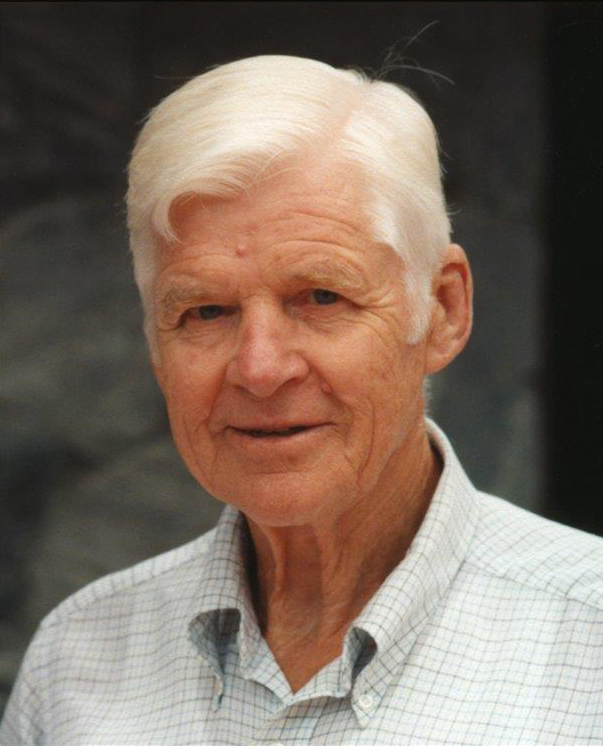
Sir Roy McKenzie

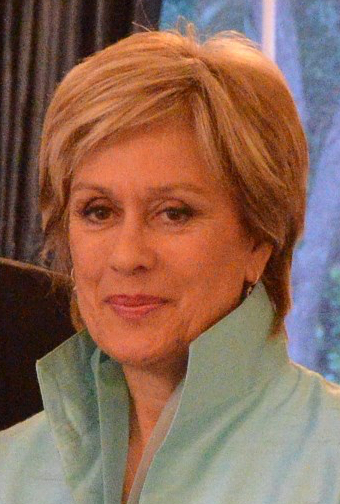
Dame Kiri Te Kanawa

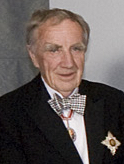
Sir Miles Warren

== Knight Bachelor ==
- Patrick Ledger Goodman CBE – of Motueka. For services to business management, export and the community.
- Dr Thomas Neil Morris Waters – of Palmerston North. For services to tertiary education.
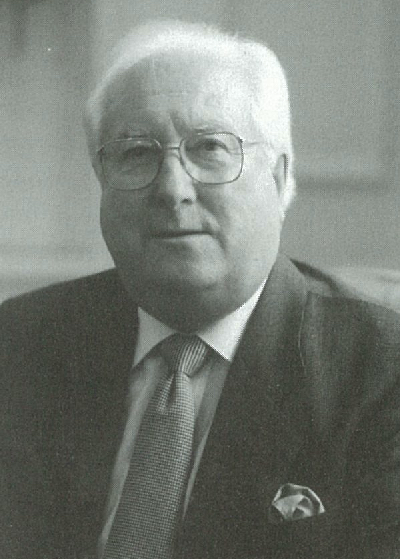
Sir Pat Goodman

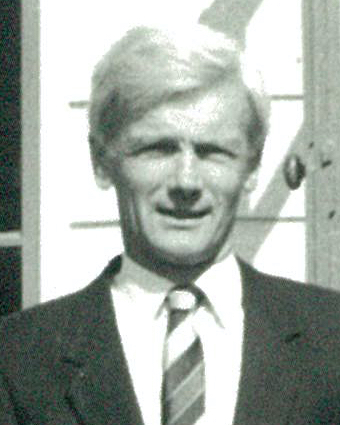
Sir Neil Waters

== Order of the Bath ==
=== Companion (CB) ===
Civil division

- Dr Graham Cecil Scott – of Wellington. For public services.

== Order of Saint Michael and Saint George ==
=== Companion (CMG) ===
- Lieutenant General Donald Stuart McIver OBE – New Zealand Army (Retired), of Lower Hutt; director, New Zealand Security Intelligence Service.
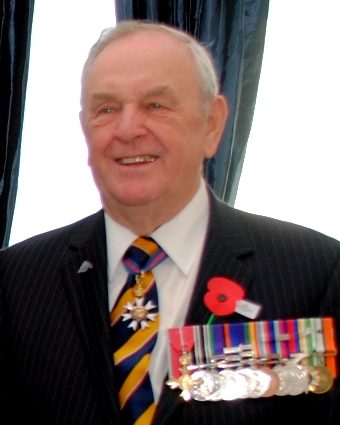
Don McIver

== Order of the British Empire ==
=== Dame Commander (DBE) ===
Civil division

- Pauline Frances Engel (Sister Pauline Engel) CBE – of Auckland. For services to education.

=== Knight Commander (KBE) ===
Civil division

- Peter James Blake OBE – of Emsworth, Hampshire, United Kingdom. For services to yachting.
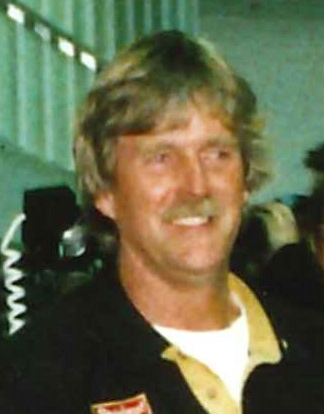
Sir Peter Blake

=== Commander (CBE) ===
Civil division

- Dianne Jean Armstrong – of Wellington. For services to the Royal New Zealand Plunket Society.
- Russell Coutts MBE – of Auckland. For services to yachting.
- Morva Olwyn Croxson – of Palmerston North. For services to arts and the community.
- Albert Barrie Downey – of Auckland. For services to business and the community.
- Graeme James Marsh – of Dunedin. For services to export and the community.
- Alexander Phillips QSM – of Taumarunui. For services to the Māori people.
- Mark James Todd MBE – of Moreton-in-Marsh, United Kingdom. For services to equestrian sport.
- Beatrice Dorothy Anne Town JP – of Wellington. For services to the community.
- John Joseph Turei QSM – of Auckland. For services to the Māori people.
- David Houghton Wale – of Wellington. For services to business management and the community.
- Heather Jean White JP – of Te Puke. For services to the community.
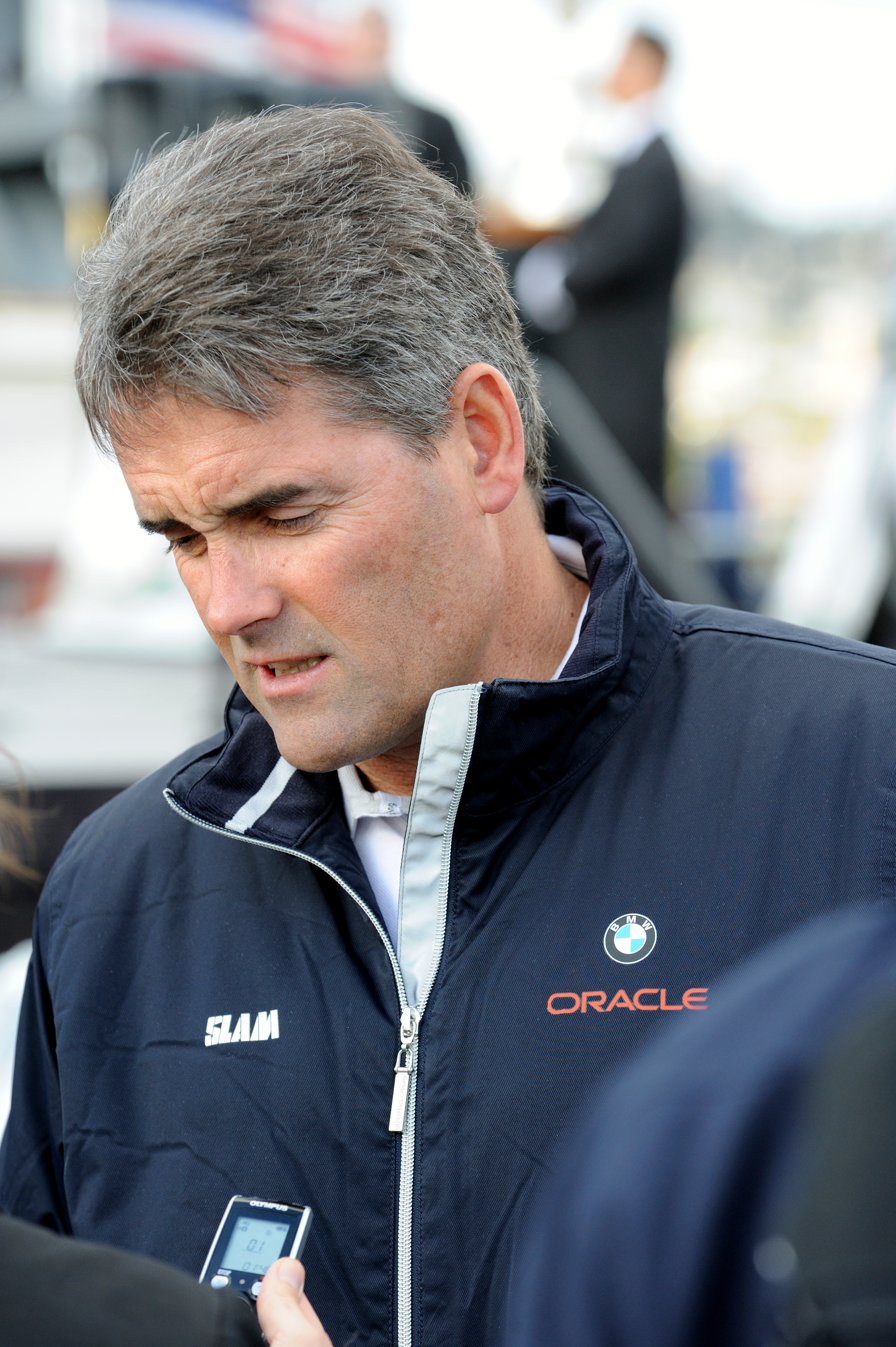
Russell Coutts

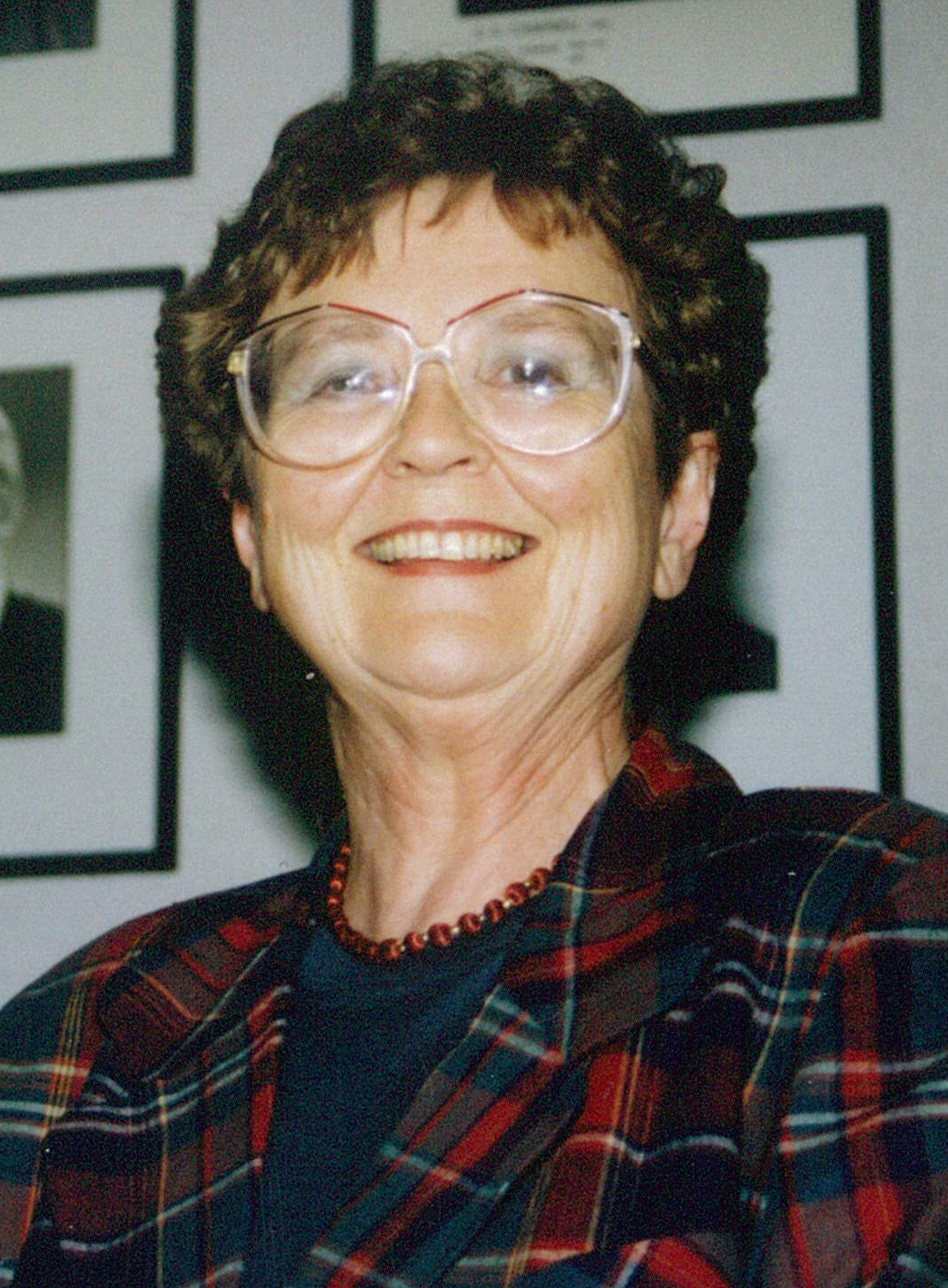
Morva Croxson

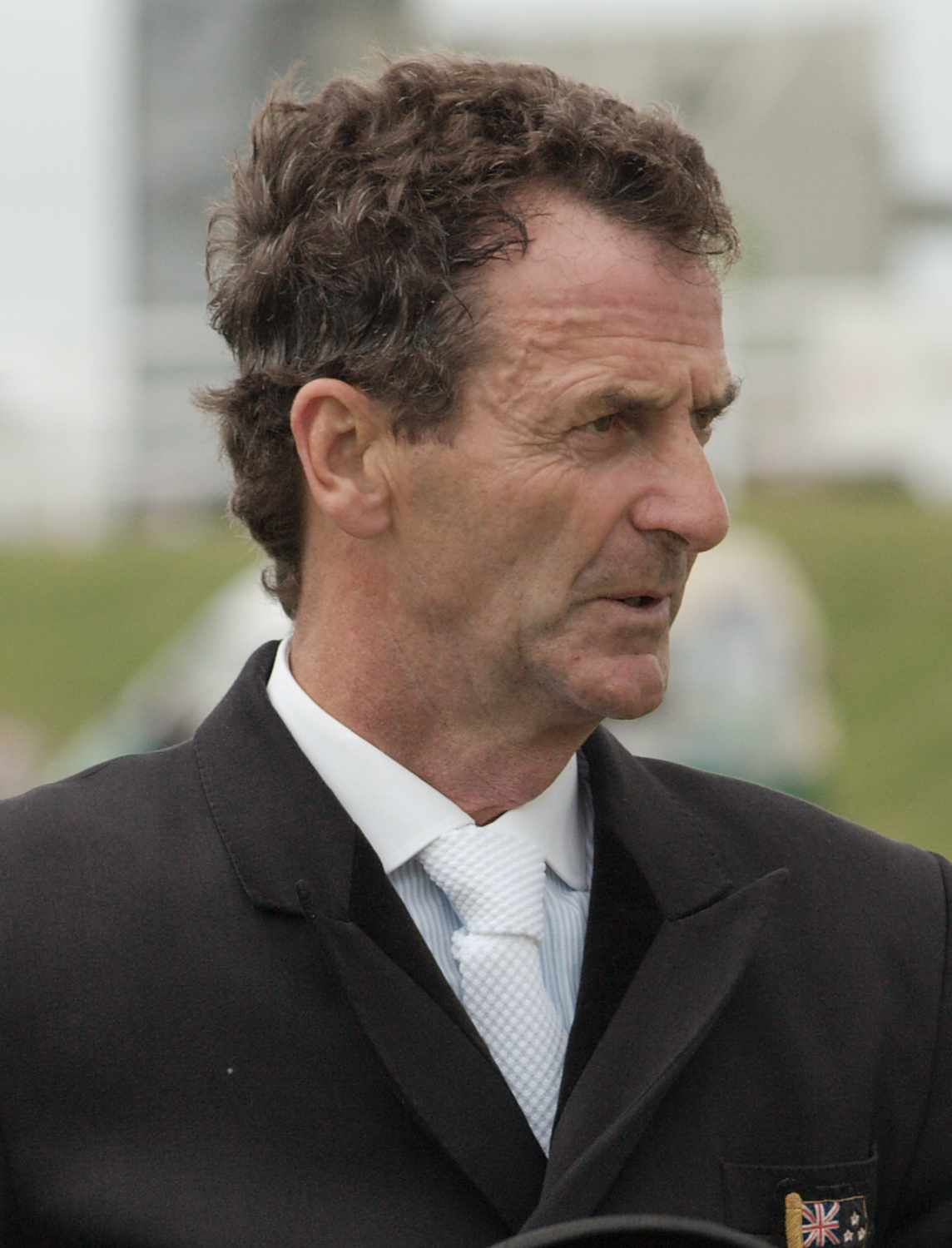
Mark Todd

=== Officer (OBE) ===
Civil division

- Donald Hall Binney – of Auckland. For services to art.
- John Kenneth Buck – of Havelock North. For services to the wine industry.
- James Bull – of Hunterville. For services to racing and farming.
- Bradley William Butterworth – of Auckland. For services to yachting.
- Leslie Hambleton Cleveland – of Dunedin. For services to the community.
- Michael Ernest Christopher Cox – of Wellington. For public services.
- Alister Austen Deans – of Geraldine. For services to art.
- Joan Marjore Dingley – of Auckland. For services to botany.
- Dr Alan Robert Edmunds – of Christchurch. For services to the wool industry.
- Dr Wayne Leonard Edwards – of Palmerston North. For services to education and intercultural programmes.
- William Clive Edwards – of Auckland. For services to the community.
- John Noel Keegan – of Auckland. For services to business management and the community.
- Dr Hylton LeGrice – of Auckland. For service to the community.
- David Raymond Levene – of Auckland. For services to business and the community.
- Professor Robert Park – of Christchurch. For services to civil engineering.
- Suzanne Lena Prentice – of Invercargill. For services to music.
- Thomas William Schnackenberg OAM – of Auckland. For services to yachting.
- Robin Scholes – of Auckland. For services to the film industry.

Military division

- Commander Larry Robbins – Royal New Zealand Navy.
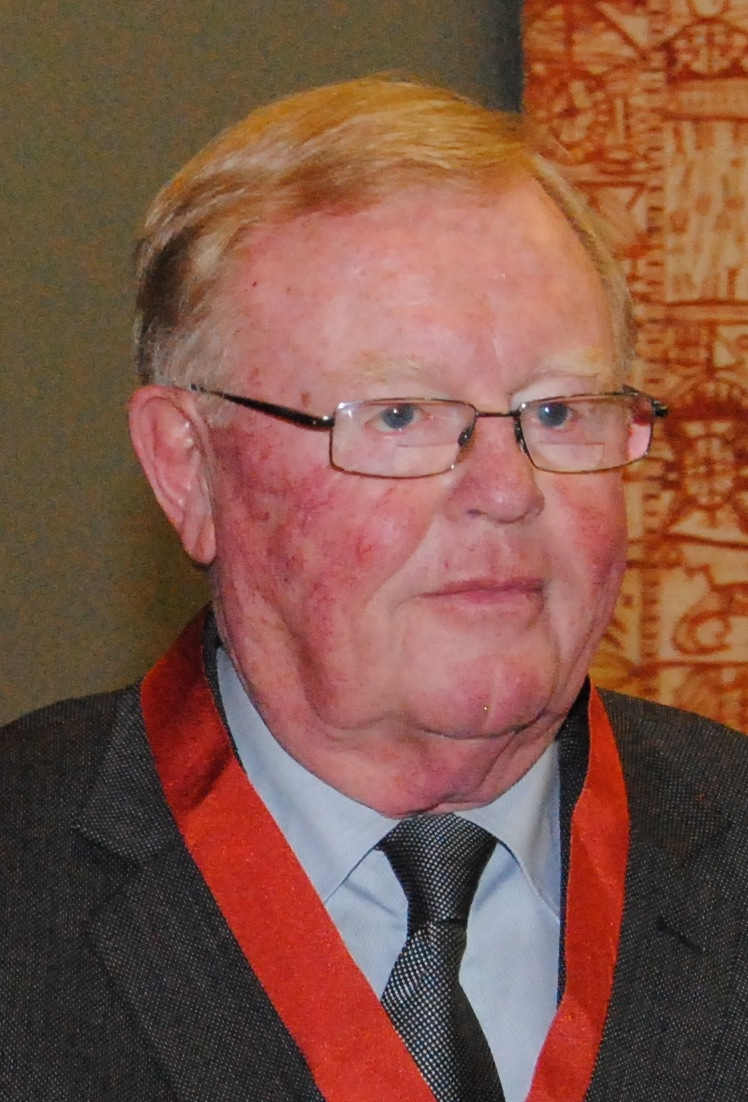
John Buck

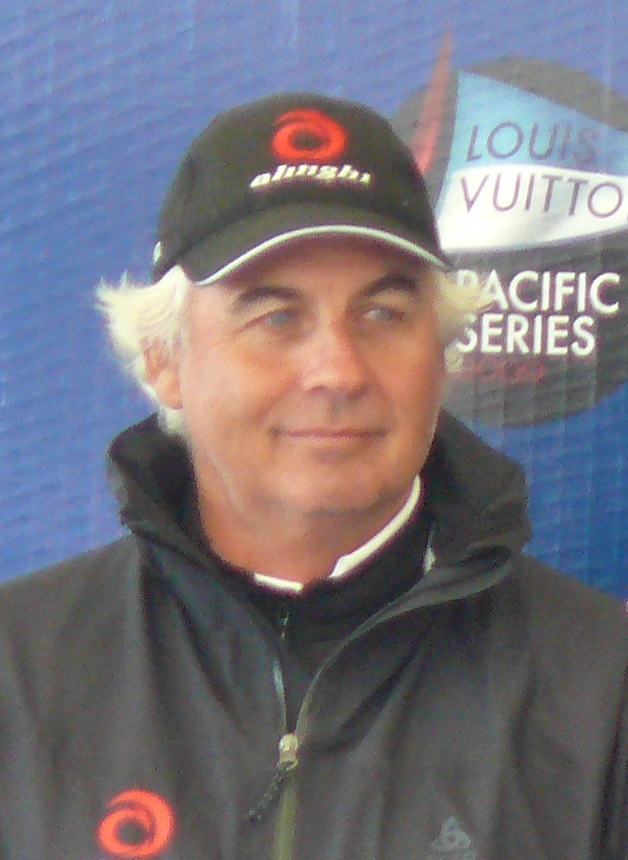
Brad Buterworth

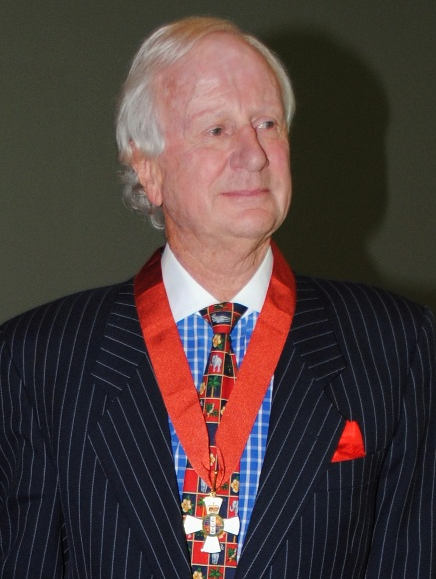
Hylton LeGrice

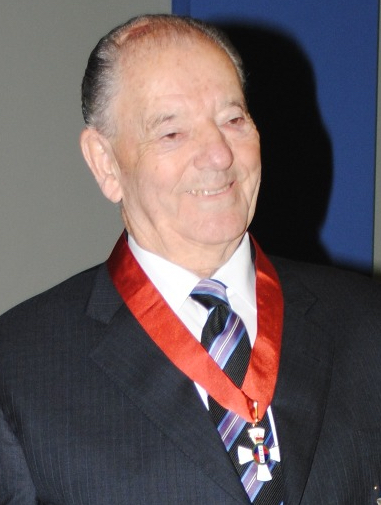
David Levene

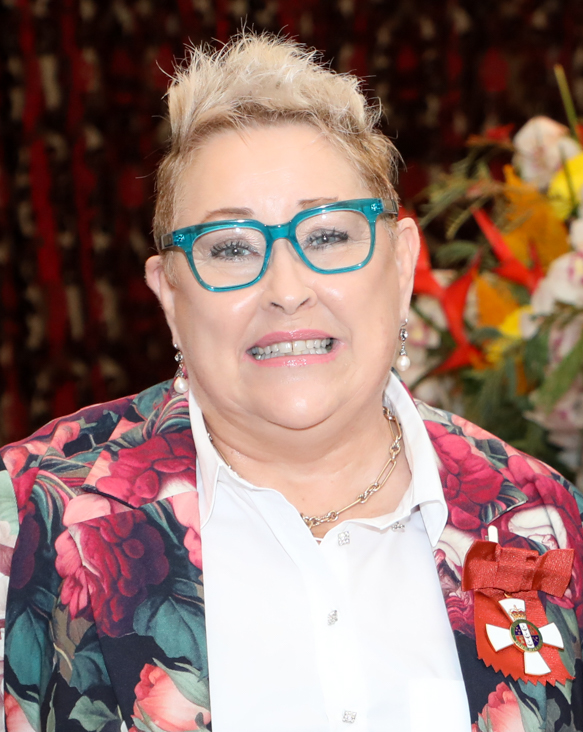
Suzanne Prentice

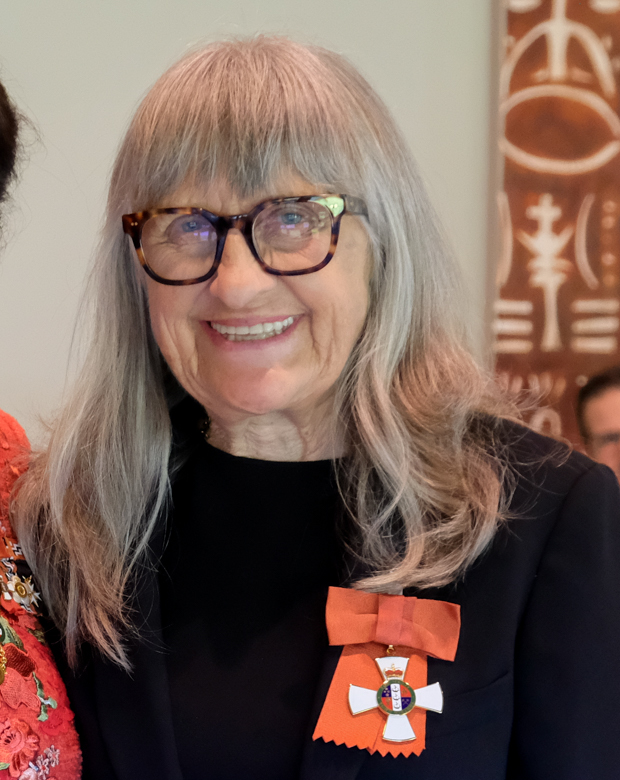
Robin Scholes

=== Member (MBE) ===
Civil division

- Marie Rose Aubin – of Dunedin. For services to education and the community.
- Marilyn Ann Baikie – of Christchurch. For services to the disabled.
- Tuakana Charlie Carlson – of Wellington. For services to the community.
- Susan Winifred Jane Dean Chatfield – of Auckland. For services to the community.
- Patricia Maldwyn Clapham JP – of Orewa. For services to the community.
- Caryll Lydia Mary Clausen JP – of Feilding. For services to local-body and community affairs.
- Owen Francis Delany – of Taupō. For services to sport.
- Sandra Helen Edge – of Auckland. For services to netball.
- Dr Bernard John Forde JP – of Palmerston North. For services to local-body and community affairs.
- Maureen Clara Fox – of Invercargill. For services to education.
- Colin Heber Gordge JP – of Morrinsville. For services to farming.
- Robert Morris Jarrett – of Pukekohe. For services to bowls.
- Peter Robert Knight – of Christchurch. For services to powerboat sport.
- Richard Trevor Vincent Linnell – of Kaiwaka. For services to the community.
- Raymond William Lynskey – of Blenheim. For services to gliding.
- Patricia Mary McQuillan – of Auckland. For services to the community.
- Arthur Dawson Moir JP – of Roxburgh. For services to the community.
- Dr Peter Charles Molan – of Hamilton. For services to the honey industry.
- Peter John Montgomery – of Auckland. For services to sports broadcasting.
- Alan Joseph O'Connell – of Queenstown. For services to sport and the community.
- George Emile Rennie – of Leeston. For services to farming.
- Alon Edgar Shaw – of Warkworth. For services to education.
- Eileen Margaret Skidmore – of Te Aroha. For services to the community.
- Raymond Terence Whatmough – superintendent, New Zealand Police.

Military division

- Major Nigel John Murray – Royal New Zealand Army Medical Corps.
- Squadron Leader Kenneth Albert James Cunningham – Royal New Zealand Air Force.
- Squadron Leader Graeme Warren Harris – Royal New Zealand Air Force (Retired).
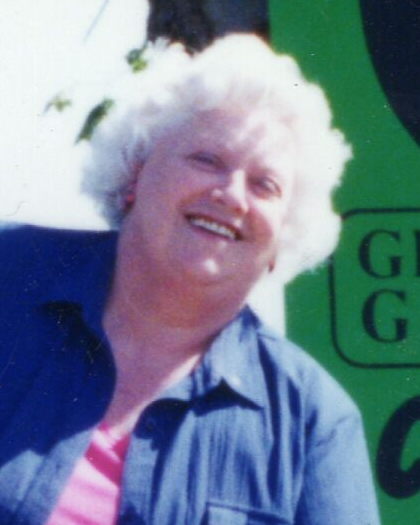
Caryll Clausen

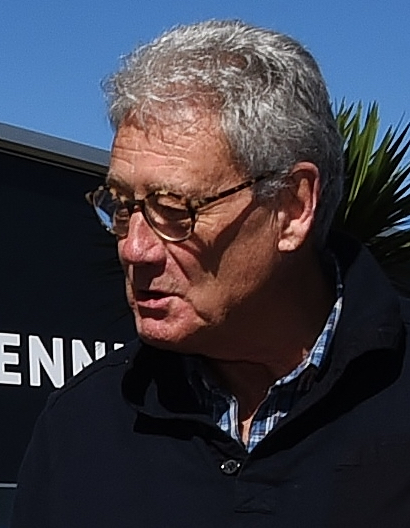
Peter Montgomery

== British Empire Medal (BEM) ==
Military division

- Warrant Officer Class Two Ross Charles Fearon – Royal New Zealand Army Ordnance Corps.
- Sergeant Darryl Brian Lark – Corps of Royal New Zealand Engineers.
- Flight Sergeant Calvin Paul Clare – Royal New Zealand Air Force (Retired).
- Flight Sergeant Ronald Gregory Cox – Royal New Zealand Air Force.

== Companion of the Queen's Service Order (QSO) ==
=== For community service ===
- Elizabeth Desiree Ferguson Baxendine – of Christchurch.
- The Reverend John Ernest Bowles – of Lower Hutt.
- Colin Arthur Gilmour-Wilson JP – of Taupō.
- Audrey Gwen Harris – of Te Kauwhata.
- The Reverend Kenneth Gerard Irwin – of Auckland.
- Archbishop Dionysios Psiachas – of Wellington.
- The Very Reverend John Oliver Rymer – of Auckland.
- Patricia Margaret Teague – of Christchurch.

=== For public services ===
- Dr Elizabeth Ursula Alley – of Wellington.
- Brian Phillip Najib Corban – of Auckland.
- Valerie Madeline Lawson (Sister Valerie) – of Lower Hutt.
- Angus John Macdonald JP – of Ngāruawāhia.
- Colin James McKenzie – of Wellington; lately Secretary of Labour.
- Margaret Moir JP – of Hokitika.
- Gladys Joyce Ryan – of Whangārei.
- David Ernest Walter JP – of Stratford.
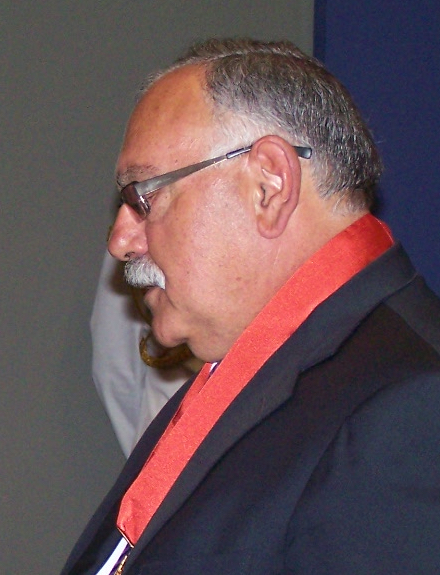
Brian Corban

== Queen's Service Medal (QSM) ==
=== For community service ===
- Sarah Teira Priscilla Ashby JP – of Te Kūiti.
- Patricia Irene Ball – of Hamilton.
- Robert Anthony Leighton Batley – of Taihape.
- June Emily Bonnington – of Timaru.
- Owen Mervyn Brookes JP – of Huntly.
- Doreen Elizabeth Burns – of Waiheke Island.
- Hilda Ngahiraka Rangi Busby – of Tikipunga.
- Alice Elizabeth Calder – of Levin.
- Amie Euphemia Isobel Calvert – of Waikanae.
- Rosemary Bridget Chapman – of Christchurch.
- Claire Mary Emberson JP – of Auckland.
- Esther May Hepburn – of Ashburton.
- Wiremu Hapi Hunia – of Kawerau.
- Joan Gertrude Johnson – of Wellington.
- Lorna Monica Leydon – of Lower Hutt.
- Locksley Clement Lindsay – of The Pines Beach.
- Joan-Mary Longcroft JP – of Auckland.
- Bryan Mahony – of Wellington.
- Norman John Martin – of Hastings.
- Noel Albert McMahon – of Auckland.
- William James McMullan – of Wellington.
- Frederick Lewis Mitchell – of Christchurch.
- Phillis Hilda Murphy – of Featherston.
- Clarence Roland Papps JP – of Tākaka.
- Eliza Raiha Serjeant – of Maketu.
- Mavis Eileen Steffens – of Motueka.
- Ellen Adrienne, Lady Stewart – of Christchurch.
- Alan George Tozer – of New Plymouth.
- Charles Iotua Tuarau – of Lower Hutt.
- Esther Taylor Turner – of Kerikeri.
- Dorothy Ethel Walker – of Auckland.
- Ellen Mary (Ella) Warren – of Dargaville.
- Carolyn Georgina Weston – of Invercargill.
- Joan Elizabeth Williams – of Auckland.
- Lesley Iris Wills – of Matamata.
- Eunice Boyce Wilson – of Pukekohe.
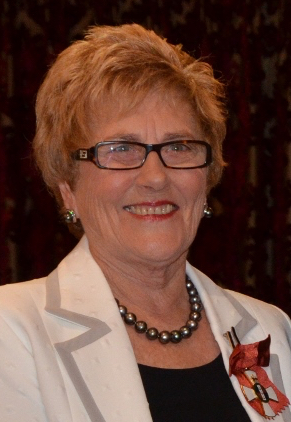
Adrienne, Lady Stewart

=== For public services ===
- Charles George Anderson – of Wanganui.
- Evelyn Annette Carrington – of Whangārei.
- Clive Basil Cleland – of Hamilton.
- Helen Dashfield – of Masterton.
- William James Davey – sergeant, New Zealand Police.
- Ian George Duncan – senior constable, New Zealand Police.
- David Peter Ellery – of Rotorua.
- Carol June Garland – of Christchurch.
- Paul Ronald Garland – of Christchurch.
- Catherine May Glynn – of Auckland.
- Malcolm Campbell Grayling – of New Plymouth.
- Ruth Jacqualine Hera Harris JP – of Rangiotu.
- Marsden Alfred Heaslip – of Katikati.
- Lorraine Anne Hill – of Russell.
- Wilfred Jeffs (Bill Sevesi) – of Auckland.
- Ian Roy Johnson JP – of Te Puke.
- Diana Patricia Lenihan – of Invercargill.
- William James McCabe – of Wainuiomata.
- Julie Margaret McKendry JP – of Blenheim.
- Heather Margaret MacLeod – of Auckland.
- Ronald Kenneth McSkimming – of Ranfurly.
- Irene Saxon Messenger – of Greymouth.
- John Bracken Mortimer – of Hamilton.
- Margaret Mortimer – of Hamilton.
- Catherine Jean Motion – of Thames.
- Miriam Harris Murray JP – of Dunedin.
- Glenys Patricia Searancke – of Rotorua.
- Helen Mary Smith JP – of Porirua.
- Heather Jane Te Huia – of Porirua.
- Christina Manuhopukia Waihape JP – of Tauranga.
- William Grigor Walker – of Clinton.
- Kathleen Florence Wills JP – of Timaru.
- Phillippa Alix Woodward – of Blenheim.
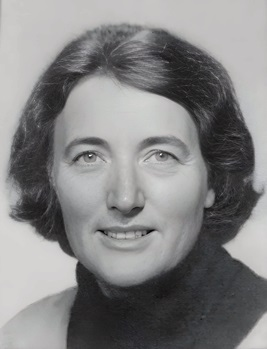
Helen Smith

== Queen's Fire Service Medal (QFSM) ==
- Walter Henry Mills – lately deputy chief fire officer, Cambridge Volunteer Fire Brigade, New Zealand Fire Service.
- Robert Alexander Morriss – chief fire officer, Te Awamutu Volunteer Fire Brigade, New Zealand Fire Service.
- Brian Muschamp – chief fire officer, Hāwera and Okaiawa Fire Brigades, New Zealand Fire Service.

== Queen's Police Medal (QPM) ==
- John Morris Atkinson Gott – detective senior sergeant, New Zealand Police.

== Air Force Cross (AFC) ==
- Wing Commander Peter James Stockwell – Royal New Zealand Air Force.
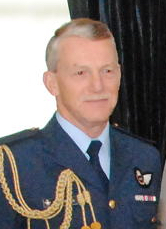
Peter Stockwell

== Queen's Commendation for Valuable Service in the Air ==
- Flight Lieutenant Grant Redvers Withers – Royal New Zealand Air Force.
