= Rails (magazine) =

New Zealand magazine

- Editor: Robin Bromby (1971–1975); Bob Stott QSM (1971–2003)
- Categories: Rail transport in New Zealand
- Frequency: Monthly
- Publisher: Southern Press Limited
- First issue: August 1971
- Final issue: December 2003
- Country: New Zealand
- Based in: Wellington
- Language: New Zealand English
- ISSN: 0110-6155

Rails was a New Zealand–based monthly periodical covering rail transport in New Zealand published by Rails Publishing Ltd from August 1971, which in 1972 changed its name to Southern Press from August 1971 until December 2003. The company was jointly owned by Bob Stott and Robin Bromby; Bob Stott was Editor and ran the editorial content and Robin Bromby was Managing Editor mainly responsible for the business operation.

The editor for the entirety of Rails existence was Bob Stott QSM. Robin Bromby was managing editor from 1971 to 1975, at which time Bob and Jan Stott become the owners of the magazine. The magazine's existence spanned the final years of central government control of railways in New Zealand (the New Zealand Railways Department), corporatisation in the 1980s (the New Zealand Railways Corporation), privatisation of the railways in 1993 (New Zealand Rail Limited, renamed Tranz Rail in 1995) and finally the purchase of Tranz Rail by Toll Holdings followed by the renationalisation of the rail network in 2003.

The magazine was initially printed by the Masterton Printing Company. In 1973 Robin Bromby established the Dunedin office, and the printing was transferred to Allied Press (owner of the Otago Daily Times newspaper). There were some difficult moments and, in 1973, the partners agreed to close the magazine to prevent further losses. New Zealand Railways was eager to see the magazine continue and committed to regular advertising, the revenue from that making it possible for Rails to survive. The rescue was very much at quarter to midnight; the next edition was about to go to print and the inside cover contained the closure announcement. At the last moment, that announcement was pulled and a full-page photograph of an Invercargill tram substituted. The economics of the magazine were further underpinned by the decision by Stott and Bromby to begin publishing rail books and this ancillary business enabled the company to turn the corner.

Rails and editor Bob Stott were often cited as authorities on rail-related subjects in the general news media. Stott continued to comment on railway-related matters after Rails ceased publication, and has had regular opinion columns published in Rails former competitor, Railfan.
