= 2019 New Year Honours (New Zealand) =

Annual awards for New Zealanders

- Previous: 2018 Queen's Birthday Honours; Next: 2019 Special Honours
- Type: New Zealand royal honours: New Zealand Order of Merit; Queen's Service Order; Queen's Service Medal; New Zealand Antarctic Medal; New Zealand Distinguished Service Decoration
- Date: 31 December 2018
- Country: New Zealand
- Total recipients: 196

The 2019 New Year Honours in New Zealand were appointments by Elizabeth II in her right as Queen of New Zealand, on the advice of the New Zealand government, to various orders and honours to reward and highlight good works by New Zealanders, and to celebrate the passing of 2018 and the beginning of 2019. They were announced on 31 December 2018.

The recipients of honours are displayed here as they were styled before their new honour.

== New Zealand Order of Merit ==
=== Knight Grand Companion (GNZM) ===
- Sir Stephen Robert Tindall KNZM – of Auckland. For services to business, the community, and the environment.
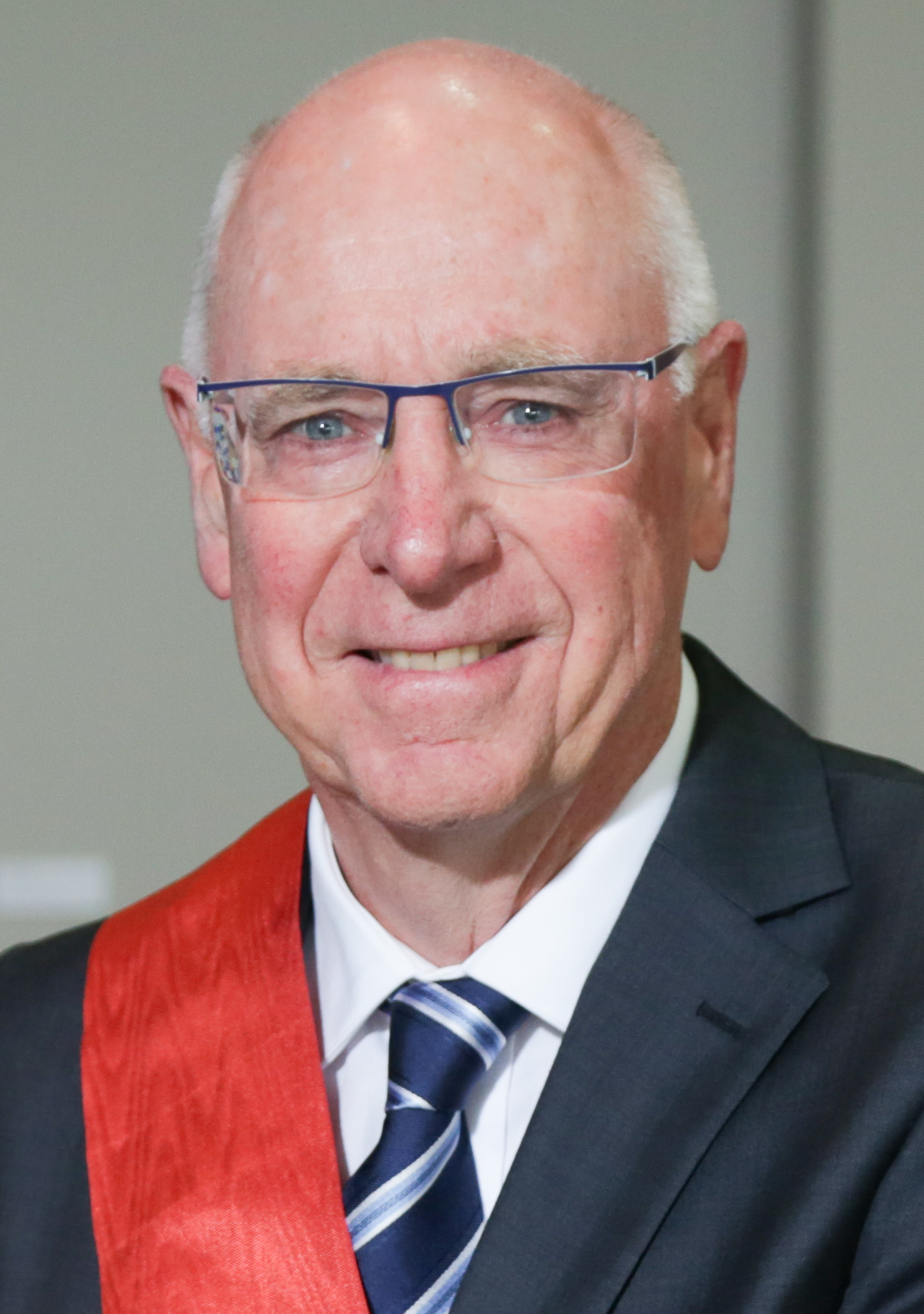
Sir Stephen Tindall

=== Dame Companion (DNZM) ===
- Distinguished Professor Margaret Anne Brimble CNZM FRS – of Auckland. For services to science.
- Diana Buchanan Crossan – of Wellington. For services to the State.
- Kerry Leigh Prendergast CNZM JP – of Wellington. For services to governance and the community.
- Gaylene Mary Preston ONZM – of Wellington. For services to film.
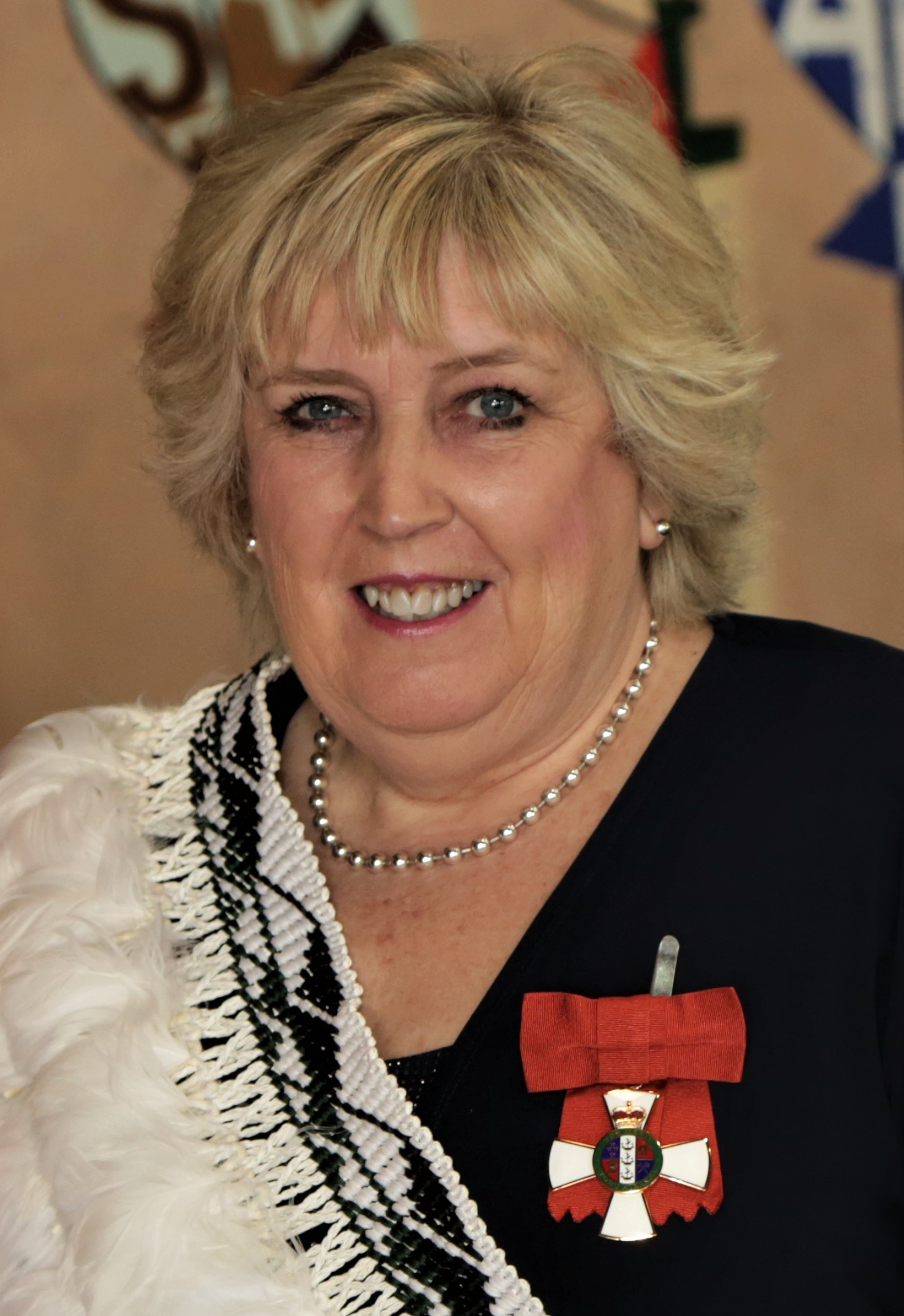
Dame Margaret Brimble

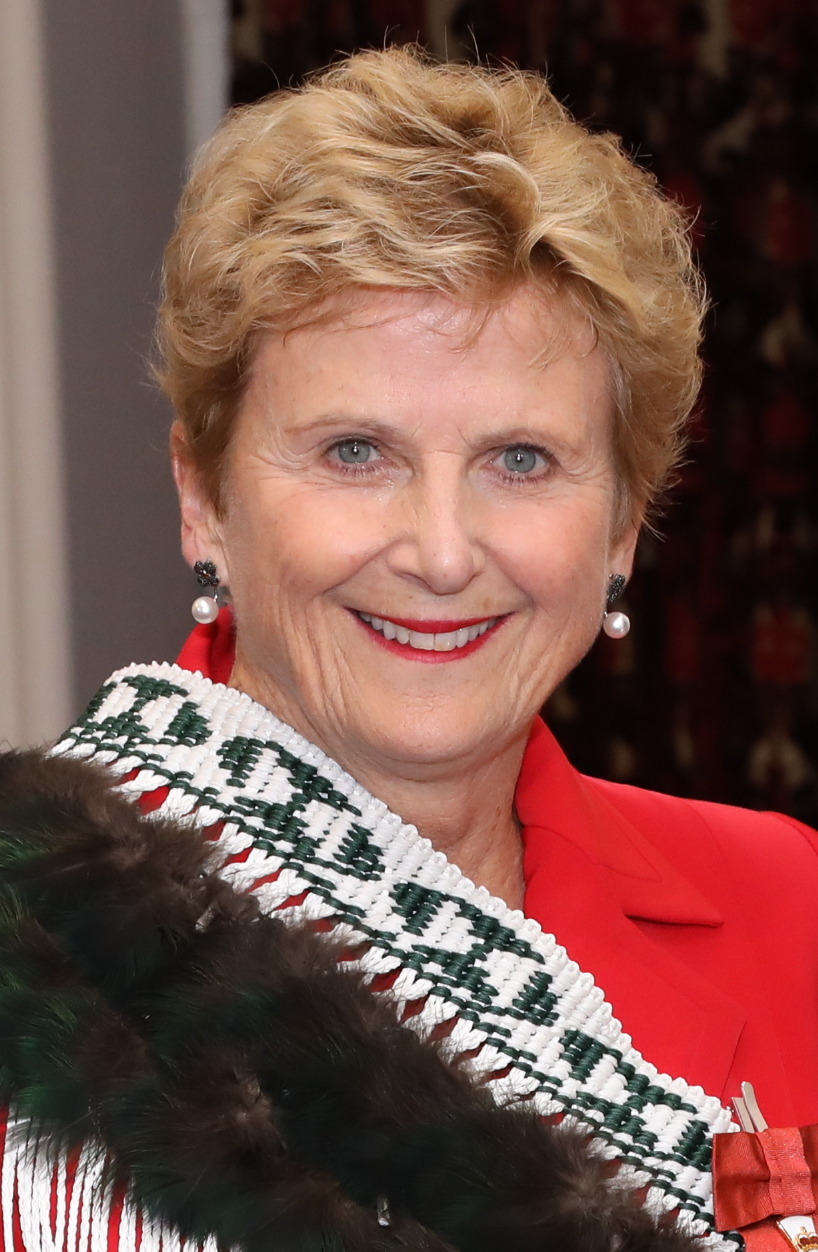
Dame Diana Crossan

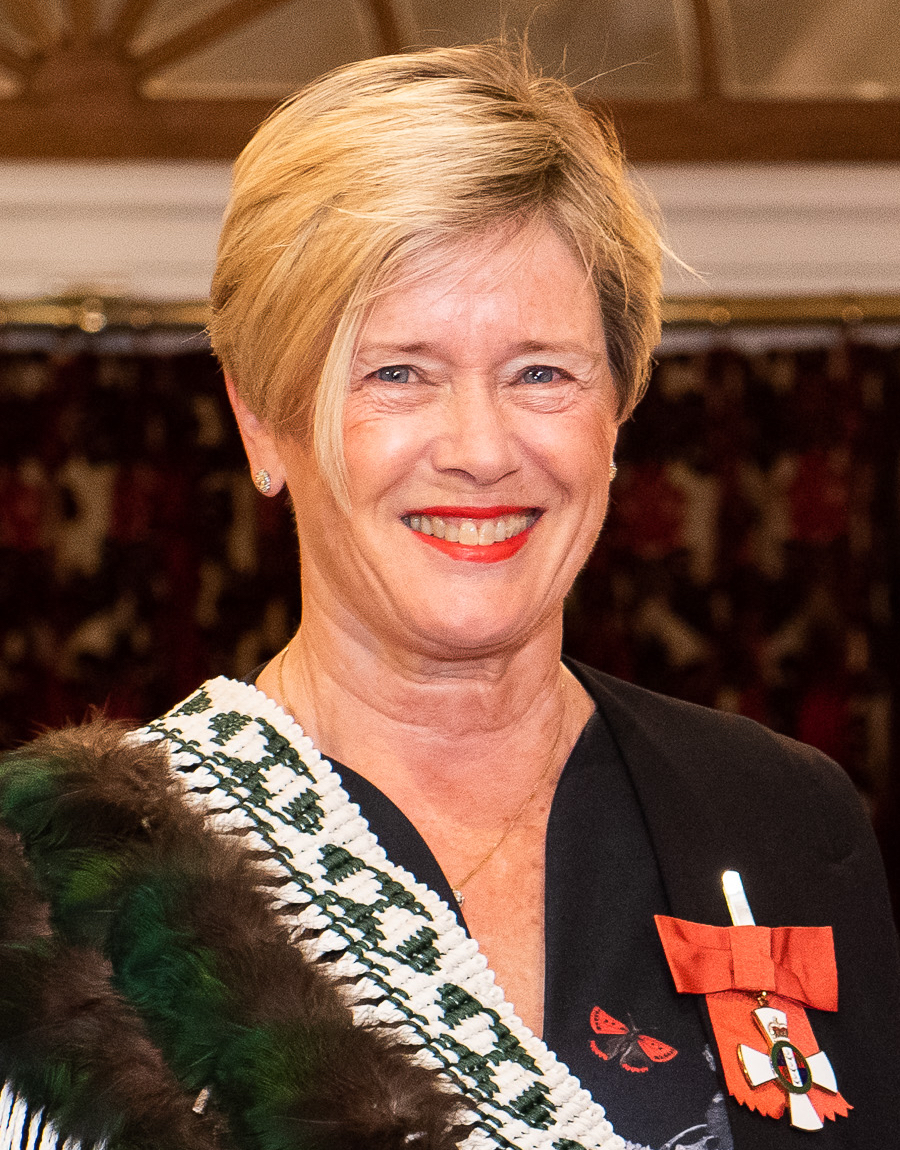
Dame Kerry Prendergast

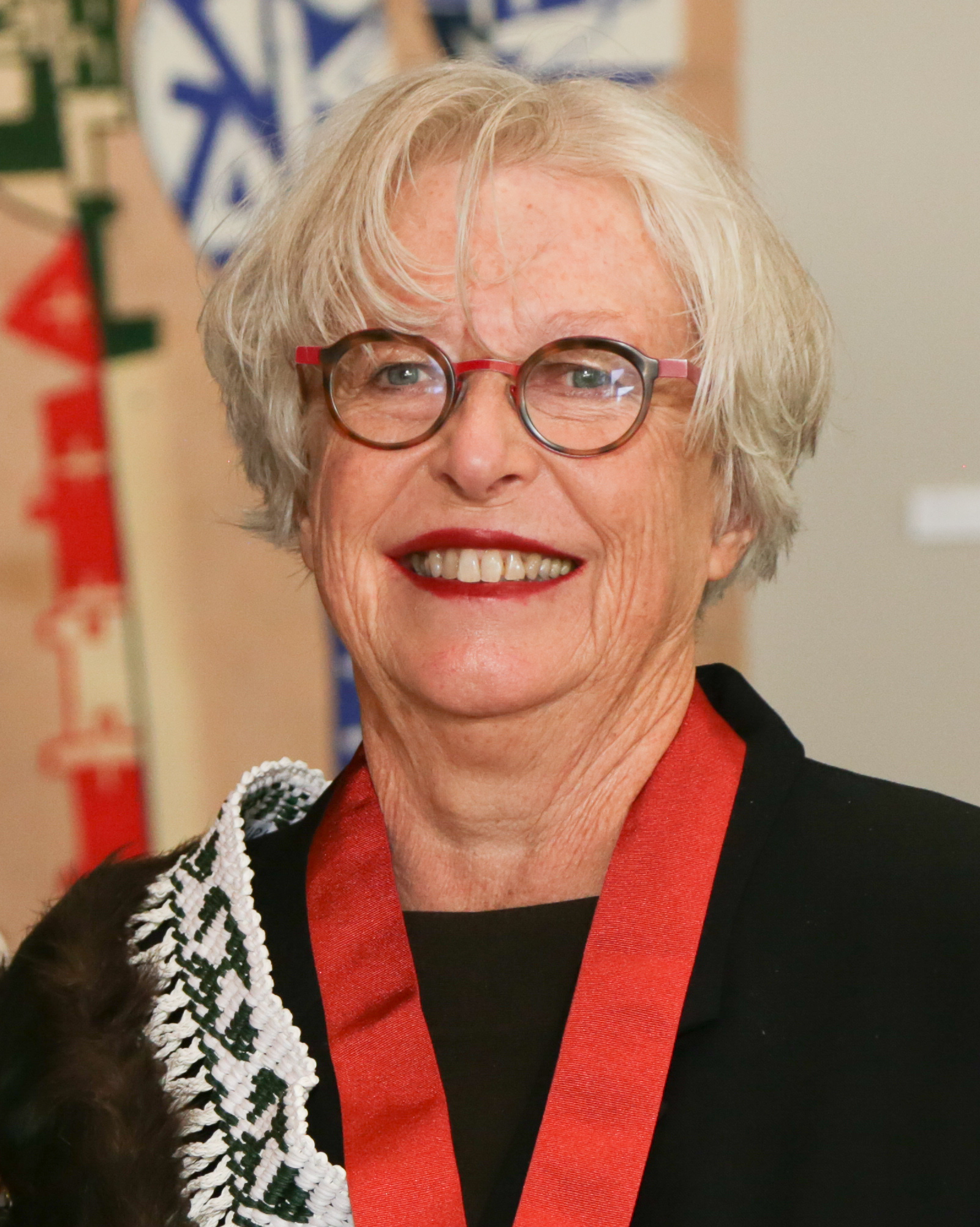
Dame Gaylene Preston

=== Knight Companion (KNZM) ===
- Dr Ian Bruce Hassall – of Auckland. For services to the welfare of children.
- Robert Arnold McLeod – of Auckland. For services to business and Māori.
- Timothy Richard Shadbolt JP – of Invercargill. For services to local government and the community.
- Robert Kinsela Workman QSO – of Levin. For services to prisoner welfare and the justice sector.
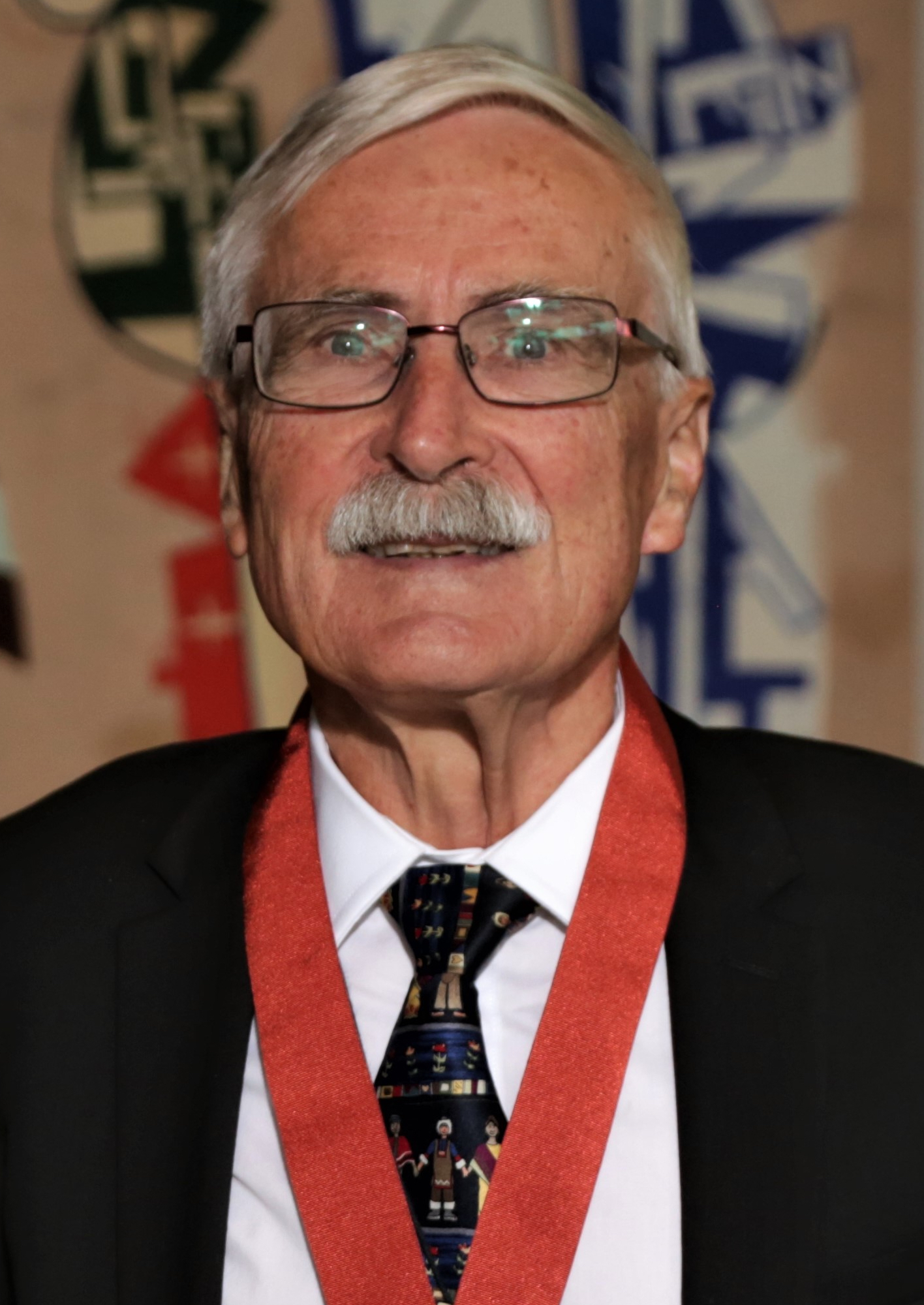
Sir Ian Hassall

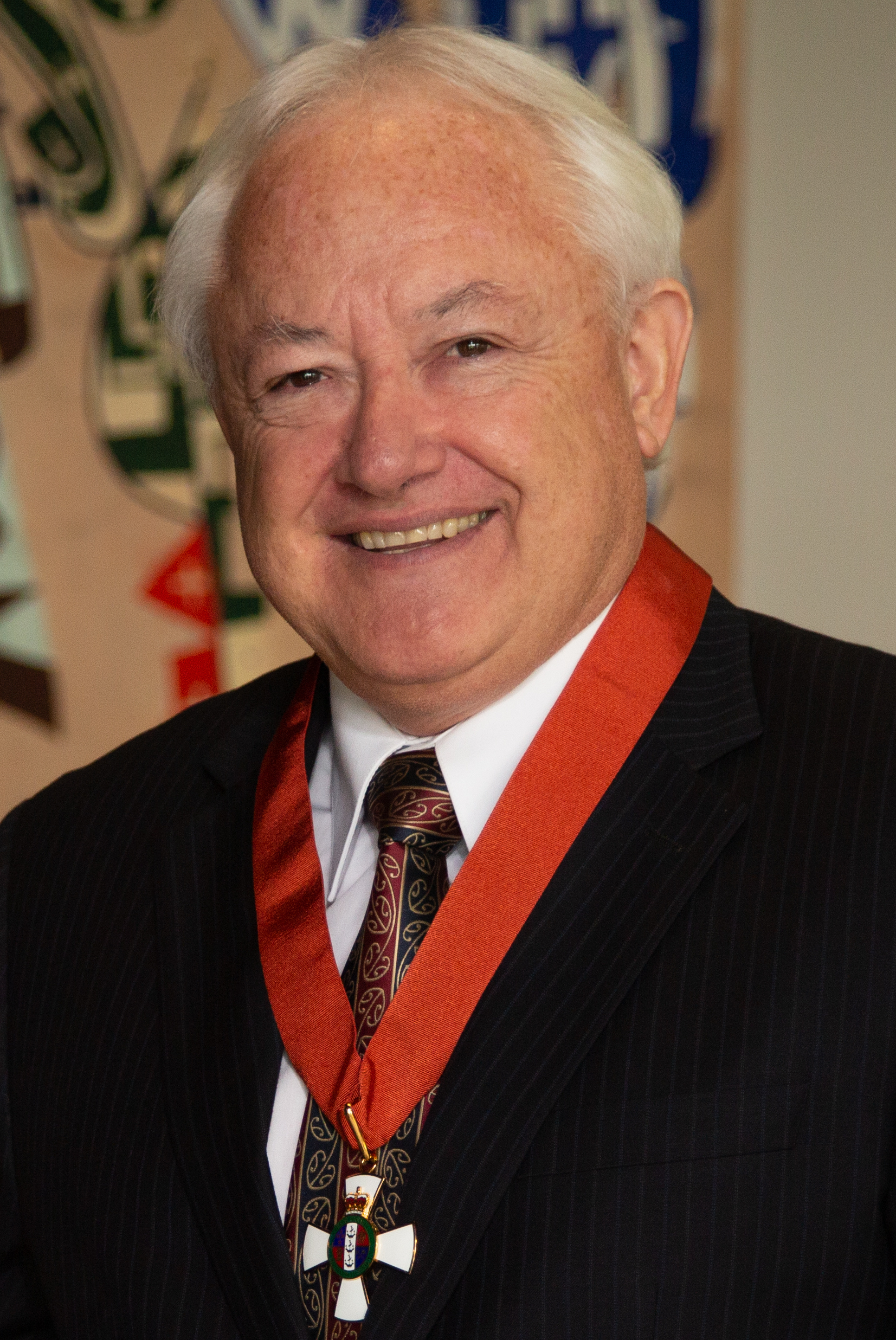
Sir Rob McLeod

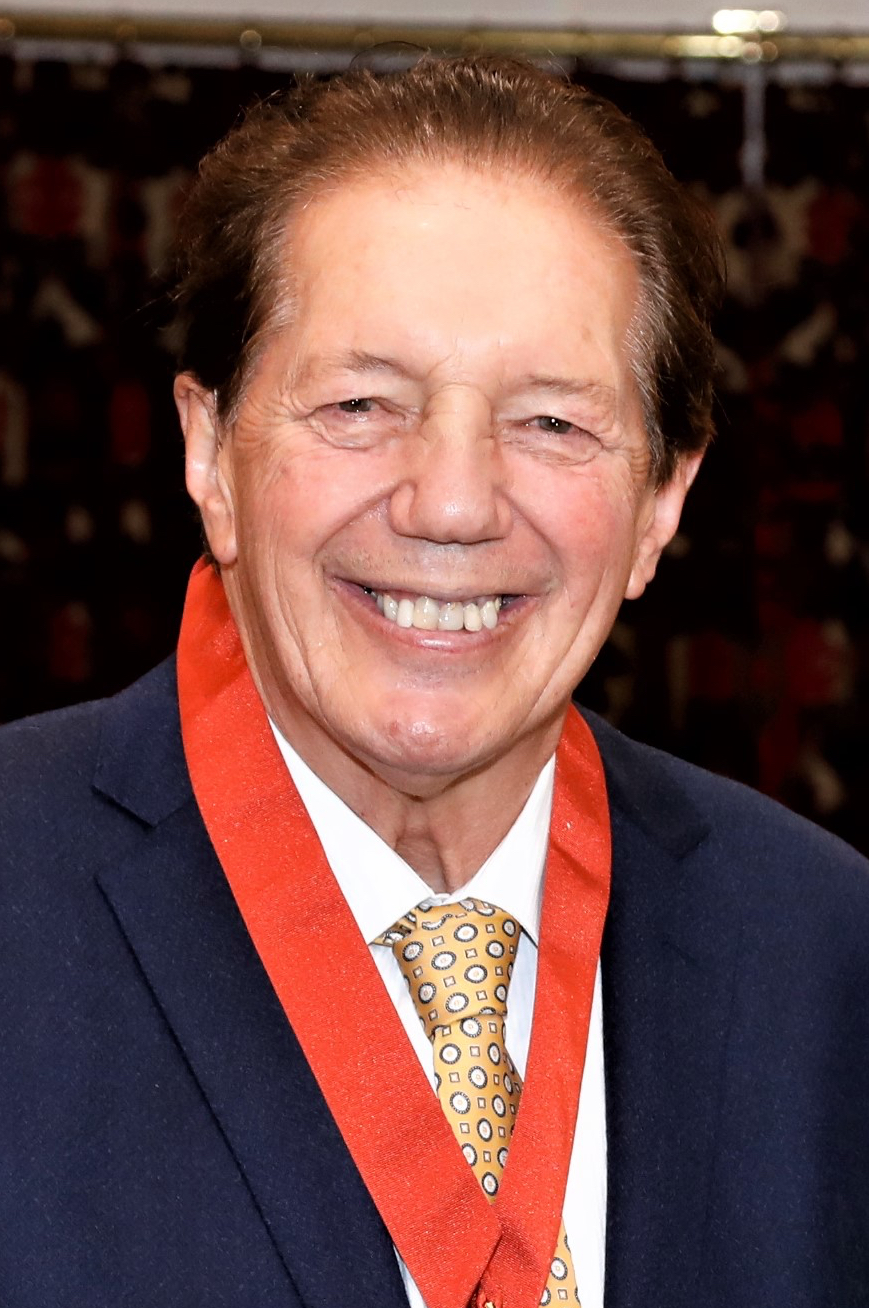
Sir Tim Shadbolt

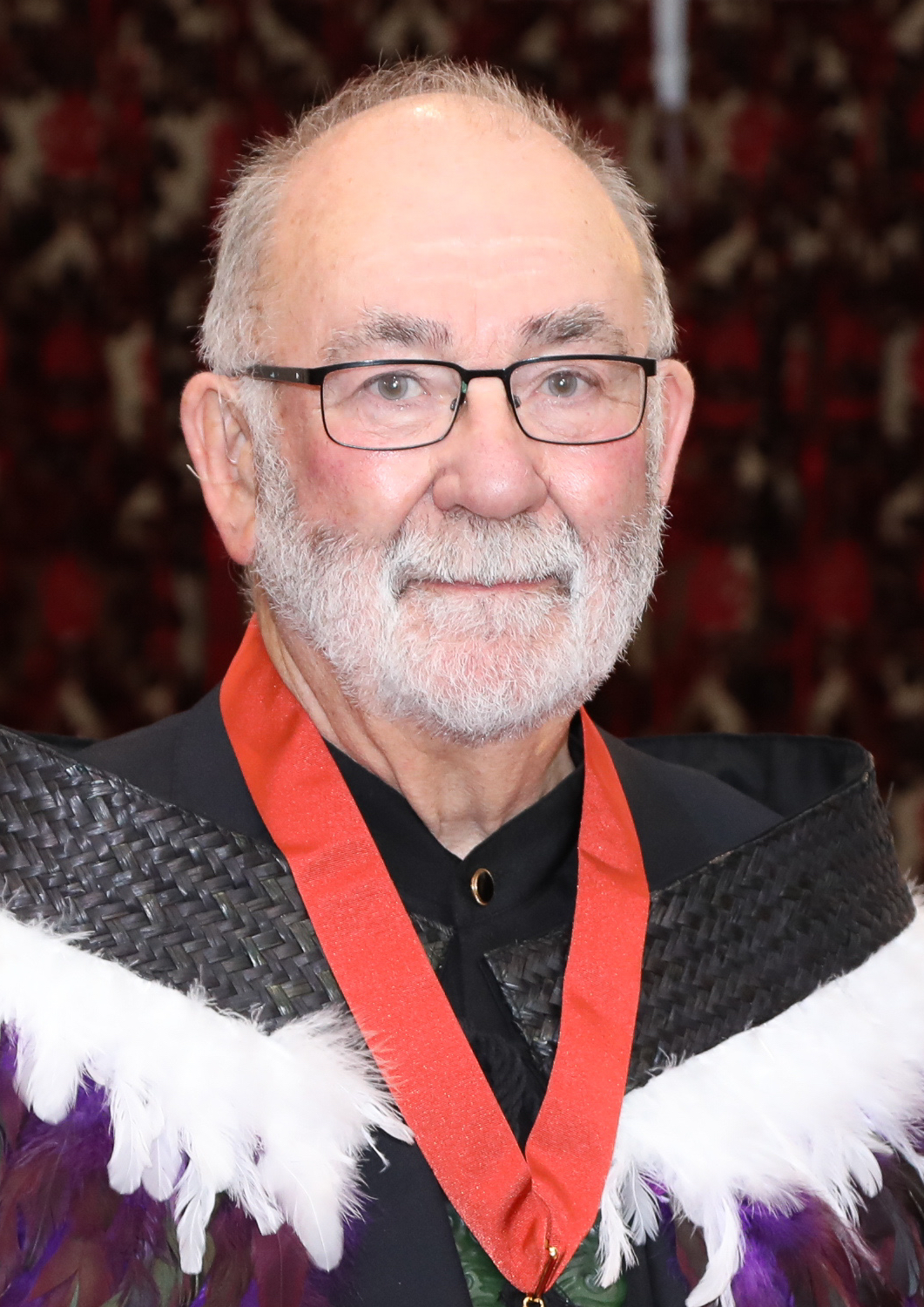
Sir Kim Workman

=== Companion (CNZM) ===
- Philip Frederick Bagshaw – of Christchurch. For services to health.
- Professor Margaret Ann Bedggood QSO – of Auckland. For services to human rights law.
- Barbara Joan Chapman – of Auckland. For services to business.
- Professor Peter Roy Crampton – of Dunedin. For services to education and health sciences.
- Carmel Miringa Fisher – of Auckland. For services to business.
- Lieutenant General Timothy James Keating MNZM (Rtd.) – of Lower Hutt. For services to the New Zealand Defence Force.
- Barbara Anne Kendall MBE – of Whangaparāoa. For services to sport.
- Owen Thomas Mapp – of Paraparaumu – For services to Māori carving and bone art.
- Major Alfred Campbell Roberts – of Auckland. For services to the community.
- Andrée Elizabeth Talbot – of Auckland. For services to the Plunket Society.
- Jennifer Cecily Ward-Lealand ONZM – of Auckland. For services to theatre, film and television.
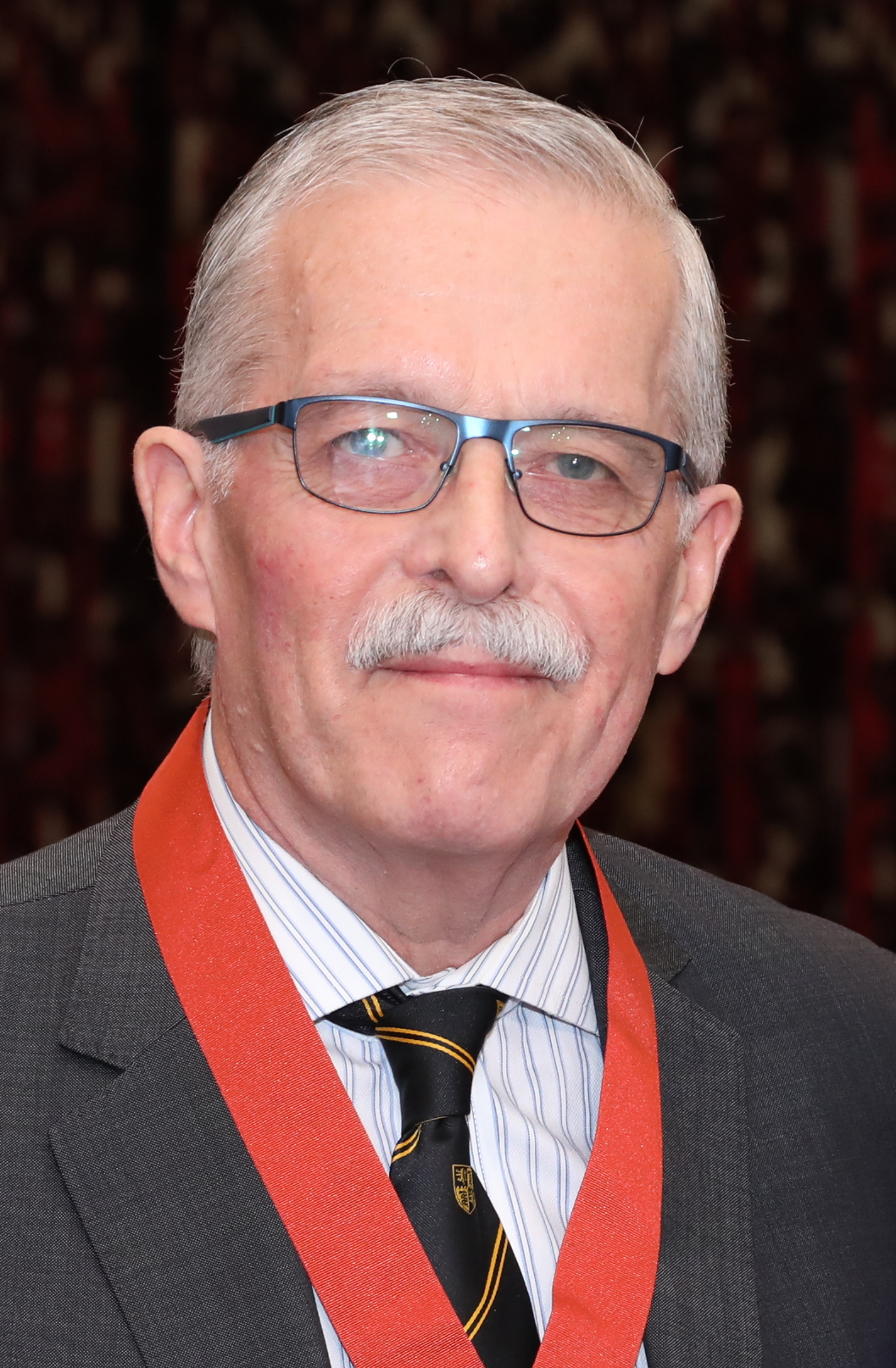
Phil Bagshaw

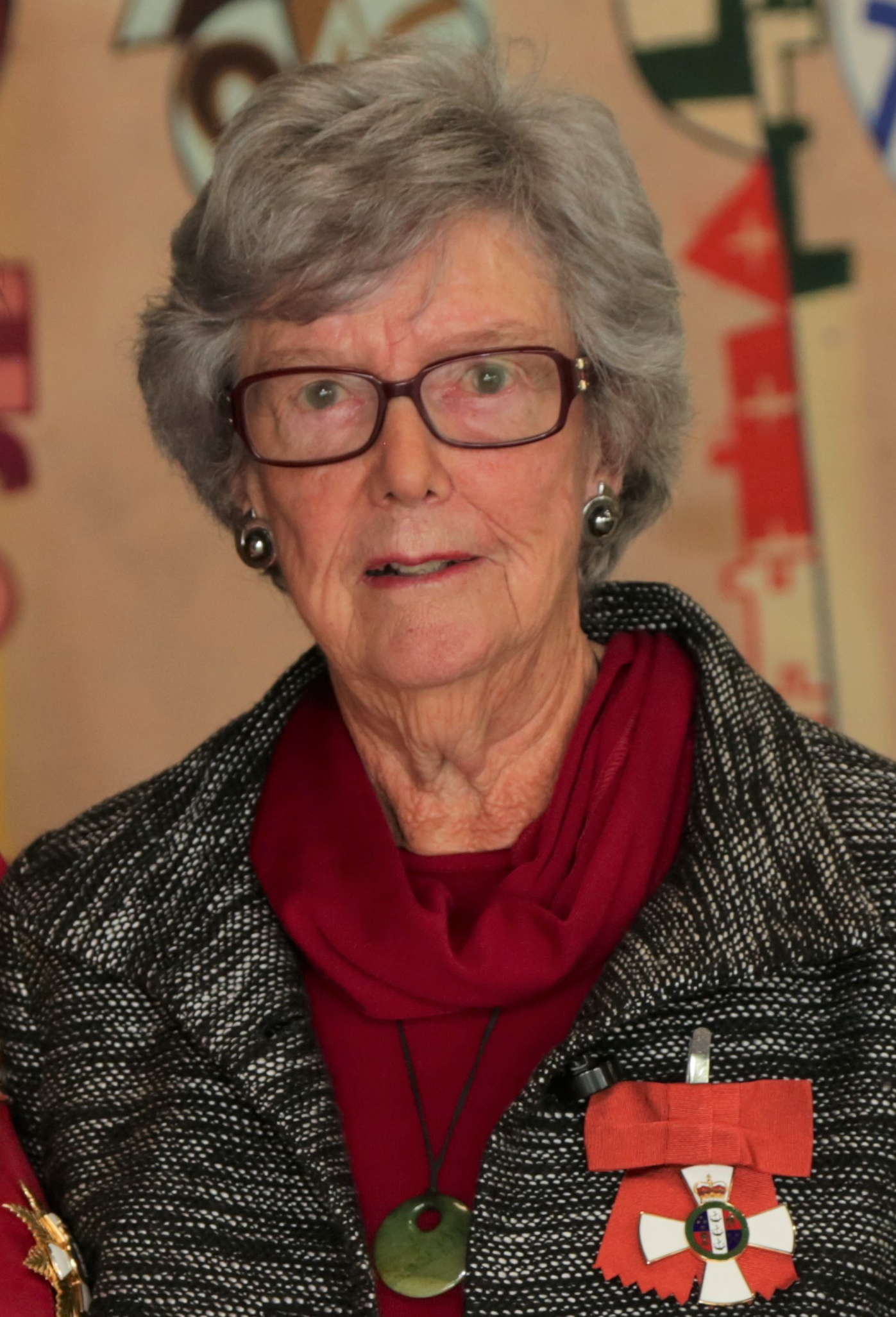
Margaret Bedggood

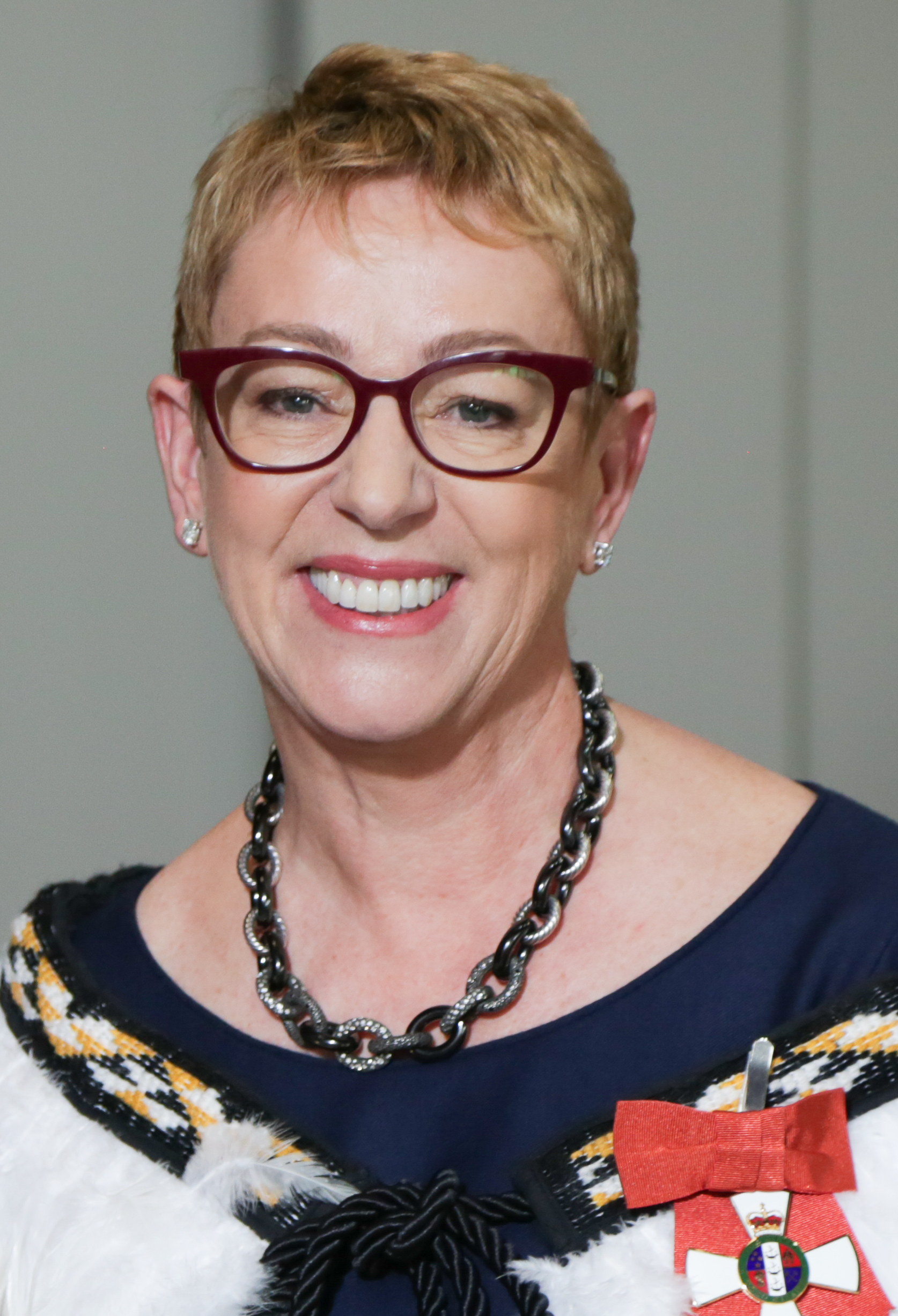
Barbara Chapman

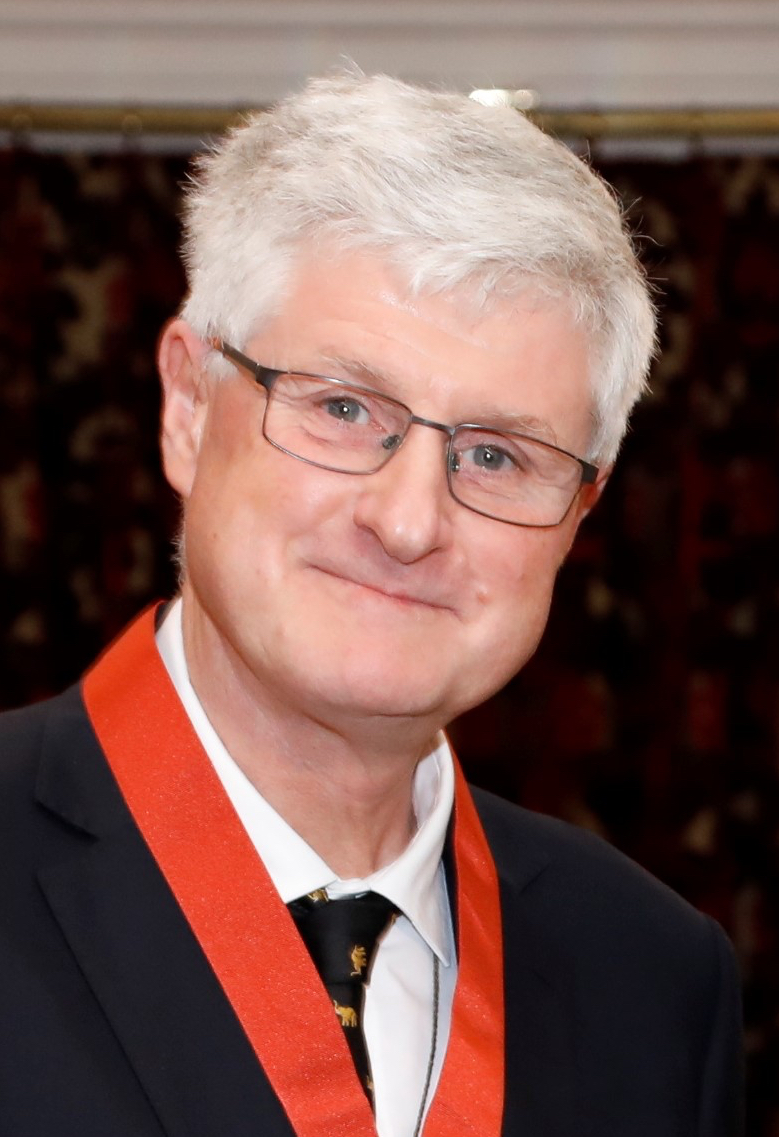
Peter Crampton

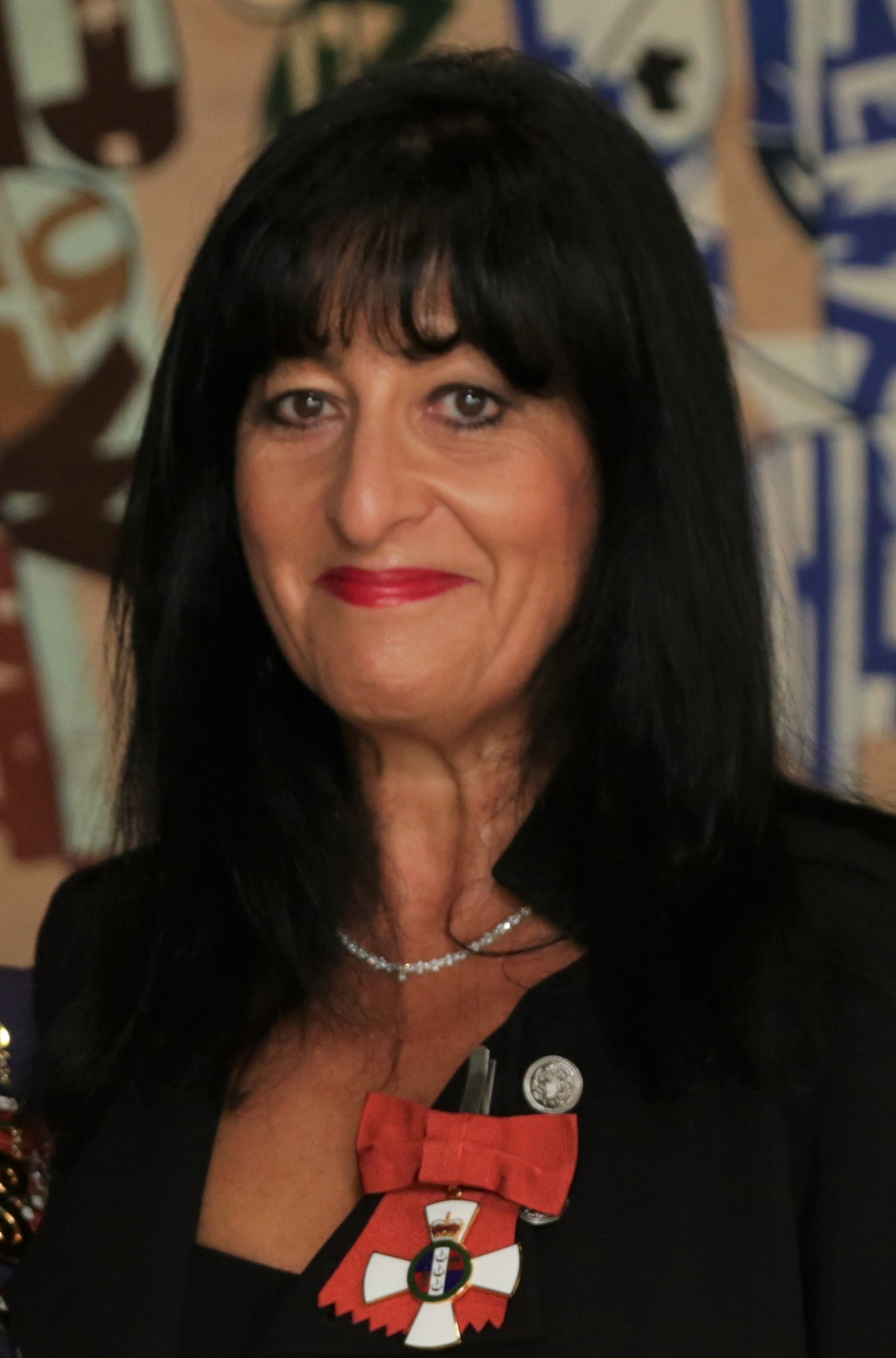
Carmel Fisher

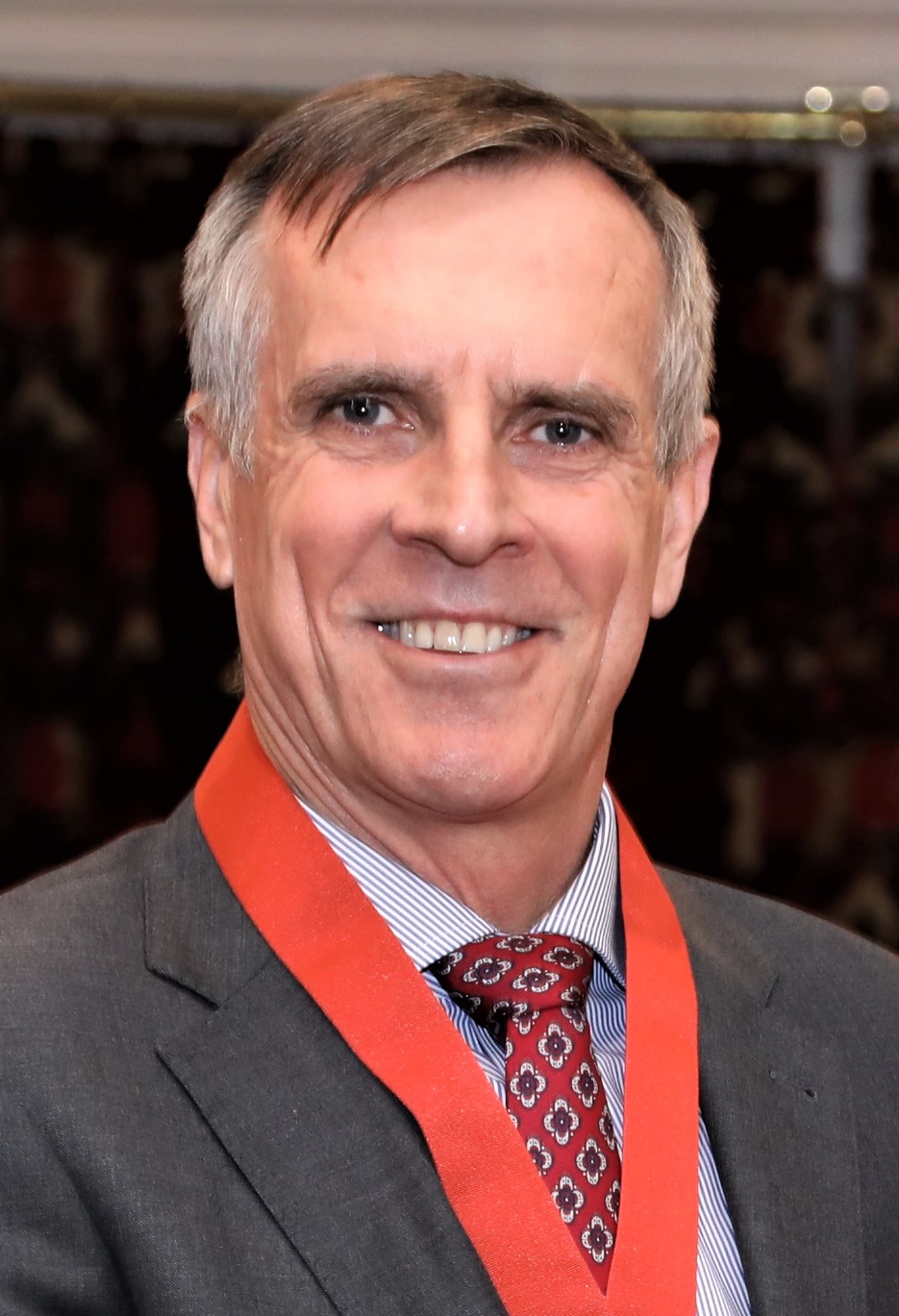
Tim Keating

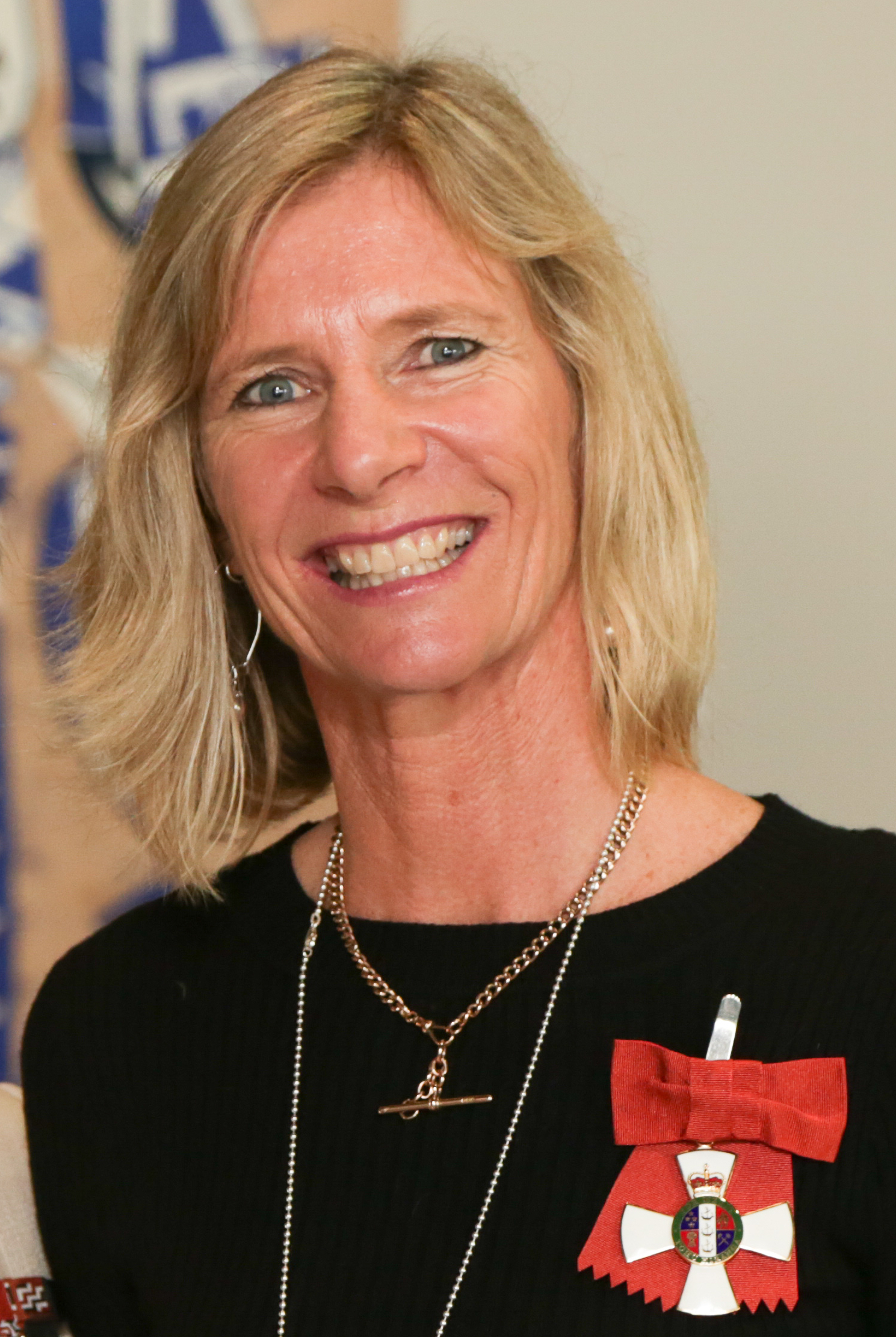
Barbara Kendall

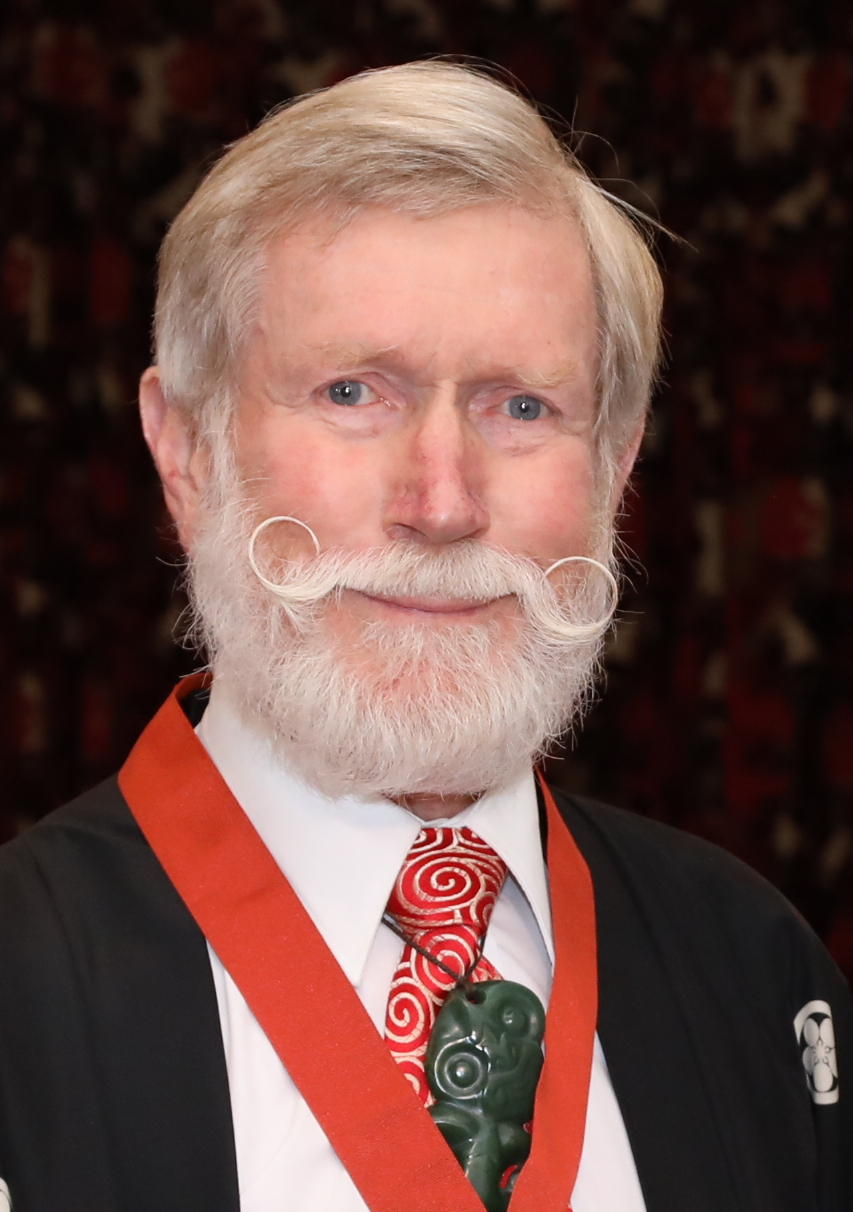
Owen Mapp

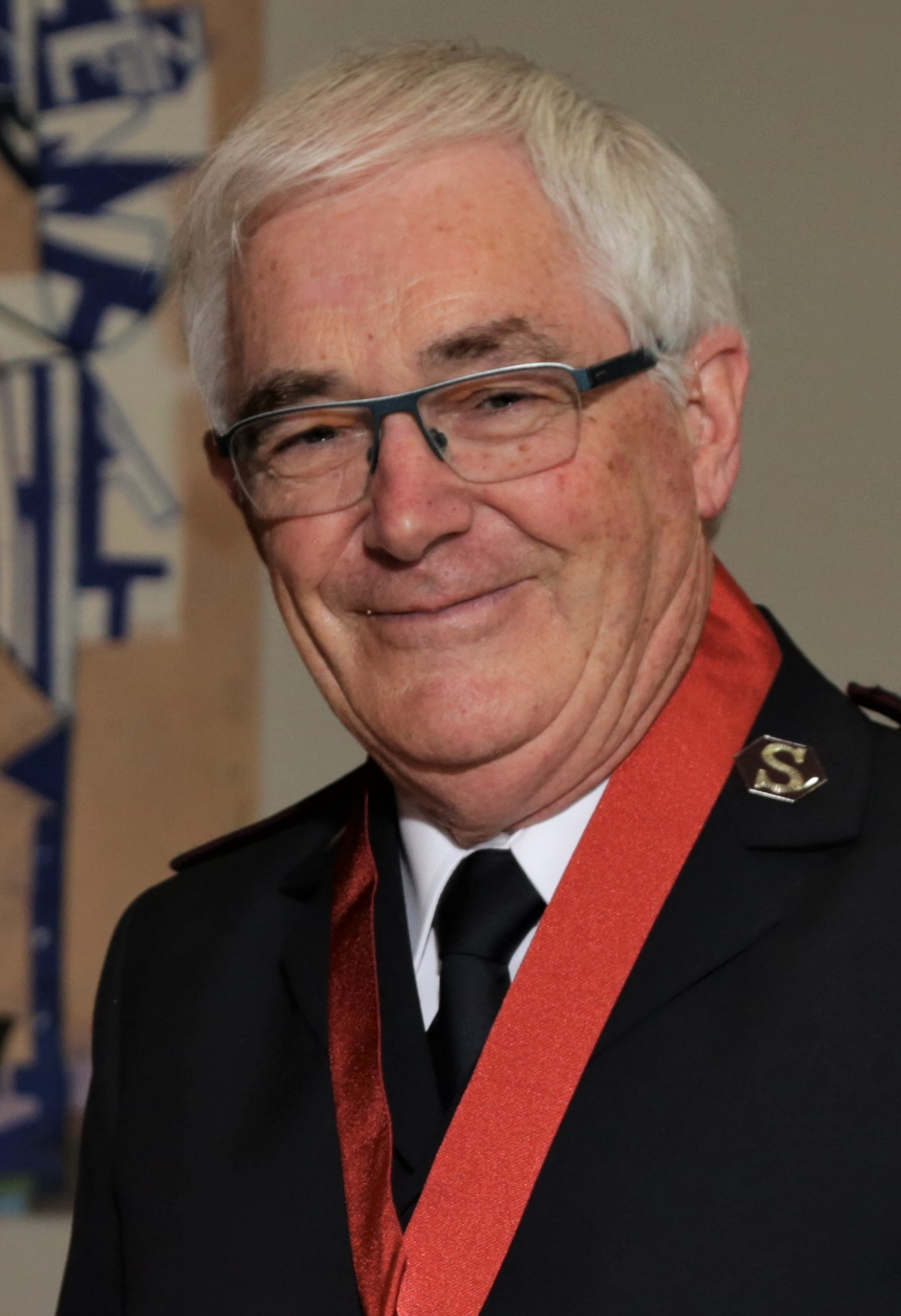
Campbell Roberts

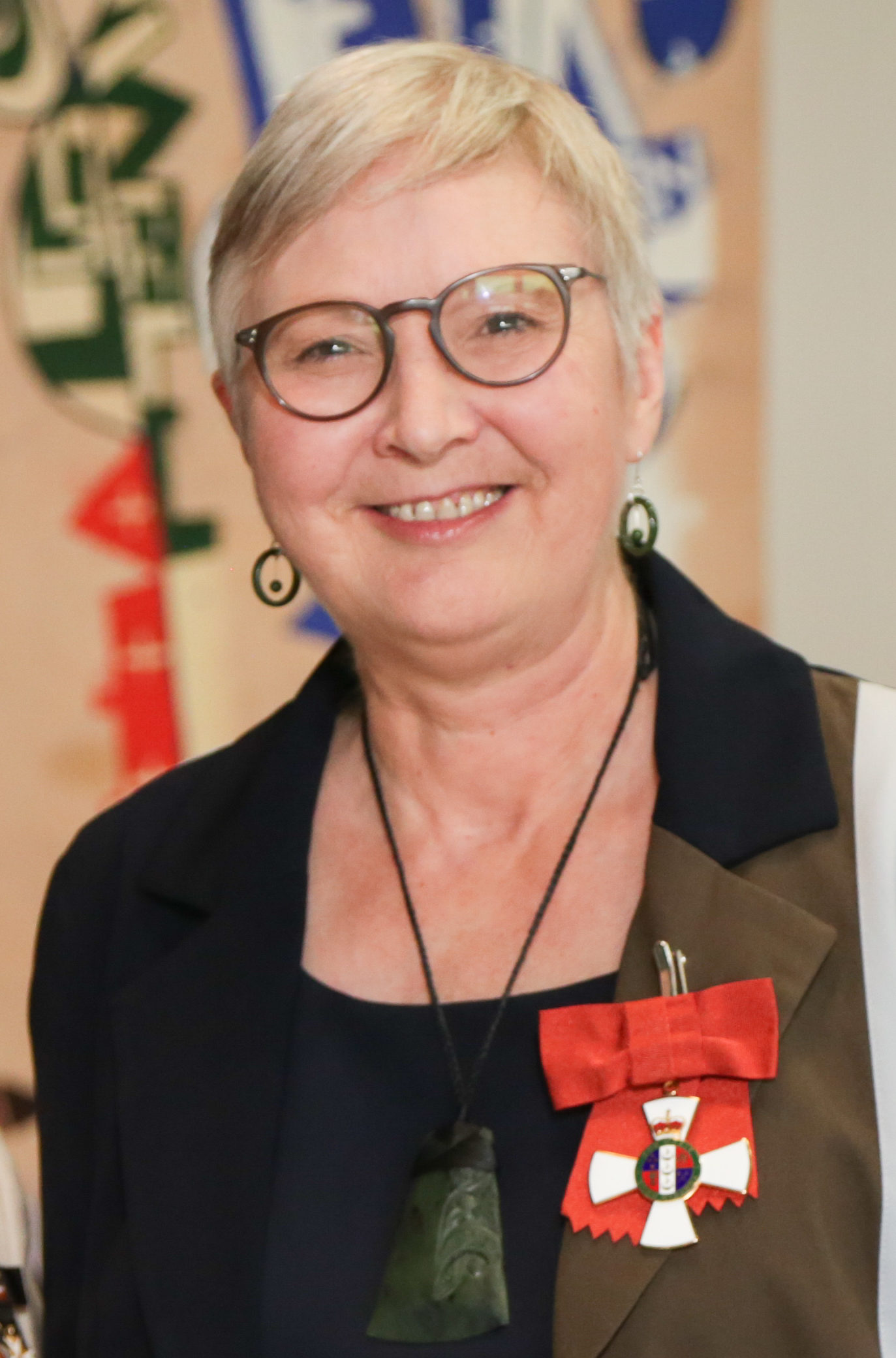
Andrée Talbot

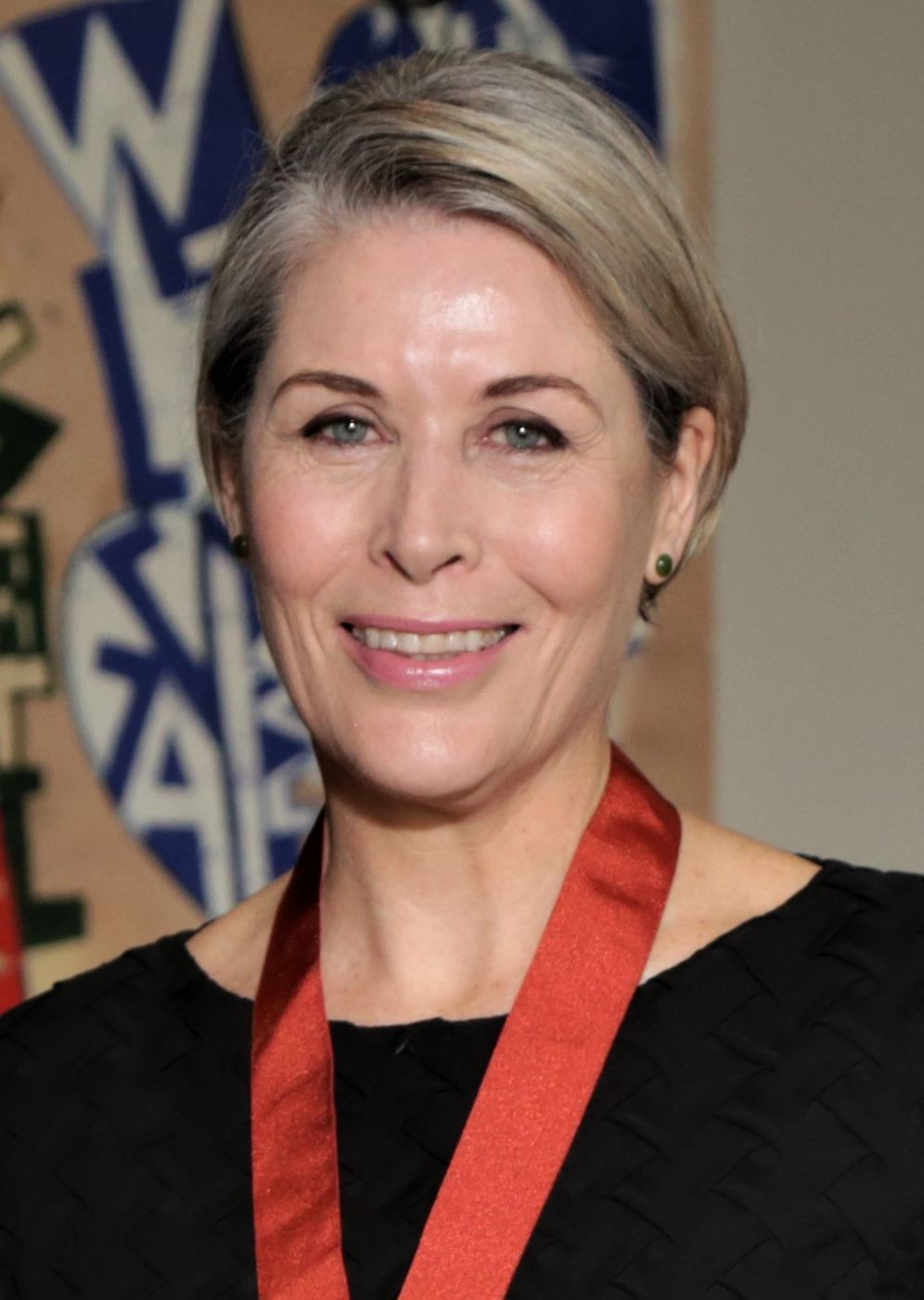
Jennifer Ward‑Lealand

=== Officer (ONZM) ===
- Malcolm James Prentice Black – of Auckland. For services to the music industry.
- Robert Falconer Campbell – of Auckland. For services to the wine industry.
- Lindsay Griffiths Corban JP – of Auckland. For services to governance.
- Ronald Crichton – of Christchurch. For services to Paralympic sport.
- Dr David Gordon Crum – of Christchurch. For services to dentistry.
- Dr Dianne Margaret Elliott (Dianne Sharp) – of Auckland. For services to ophthalmology.
- Murray Edward Fenton – of Auckland. For services to design and business.
- Dr Ian Robert Hall – of Dunedin. For services to mycology and agri-business.
- Robert Andrew Hamilton – of Auckland. For services to business.
- Shirley Yeta Horrocks – of Auckland. For services to documentary filmmaking.
- William Russell Howie – of Nelson. For services to environmental resource management.
- Dr Michael Robert Johnston – of Nelson. For services to geological science and history.
- Diane Jean Lucas – of Christchurch. For services to conservation.
- Kristy Pearl McDonald QC – of Wellington. For services to the law and governance.
- Dr Jennifer Anne McMahon MBE – of Dunedin. For services to the Red Cross.
- Frances Ann O'Sullivan – of Auckland. For services to journalism and business.
- Rore Stafford – of Ōtorohanga. For services to Māori.
- Ahmed Hassan Tani – of Christchurch. For services to refugee communities.
- Robert Gerard Tapert – of Auckland. For services to the film and television industries.
- Thomas Dawson Thomson – of Christchurch. For services to the manufacturing industry, philanthropy and the community.
- Maryanne Jennifer Tipler – of Picton. For services to mathematics education.
- Associate Professor Selina Tusitala Marsh – of Auckland. For services to poetry, literature and the Pacific community.
- Professor Adrianus Marie Van Rij – of Dunedin. For services to health, particularly vascular surgery.
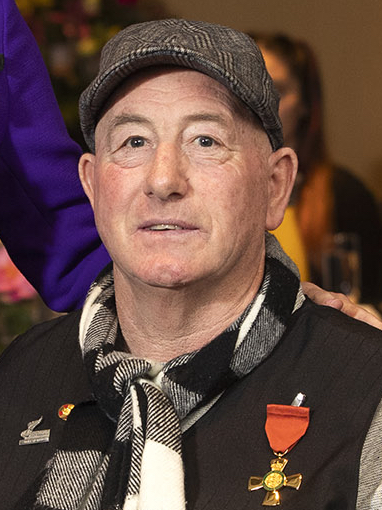
Roly Crichton

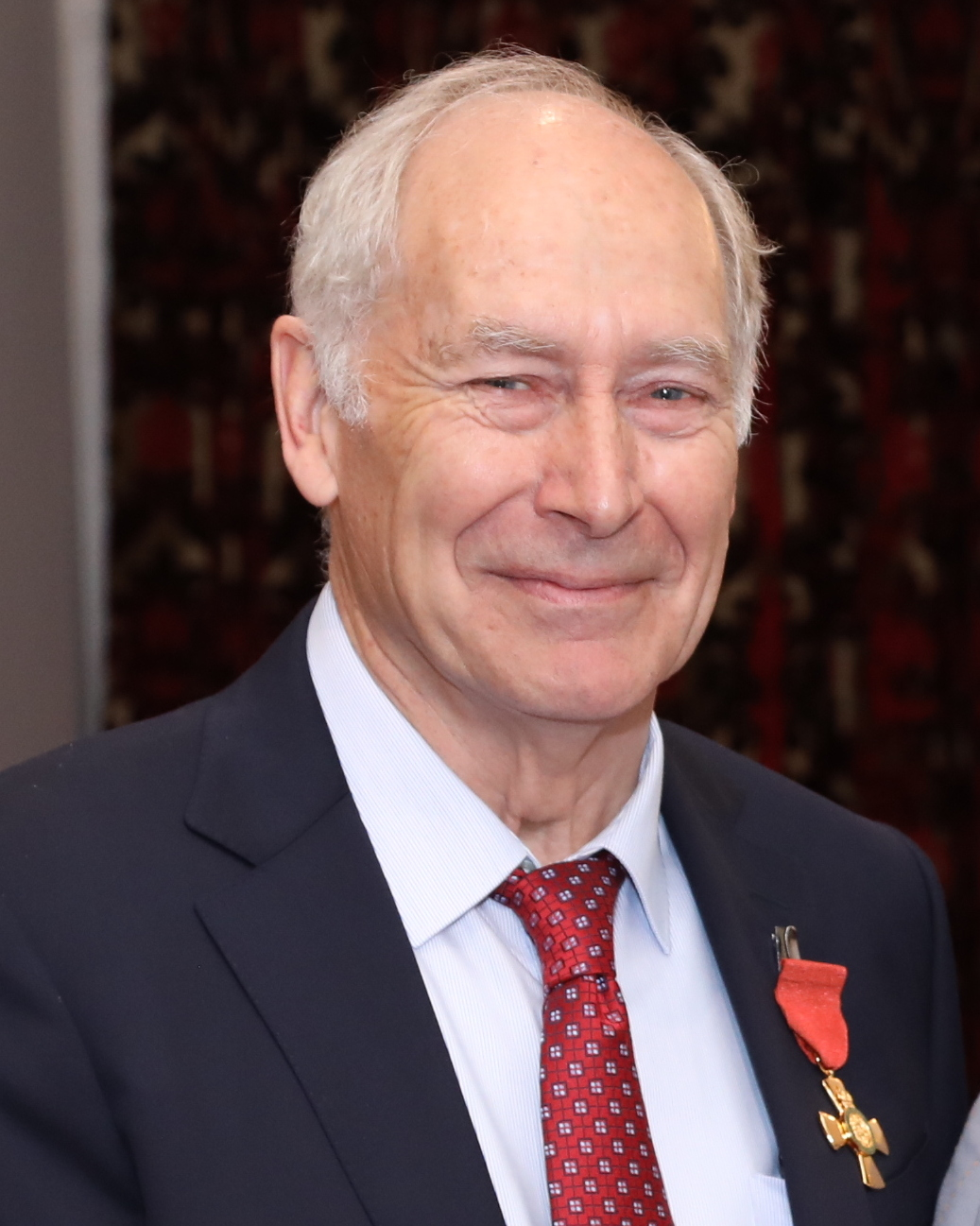
Ian Hall

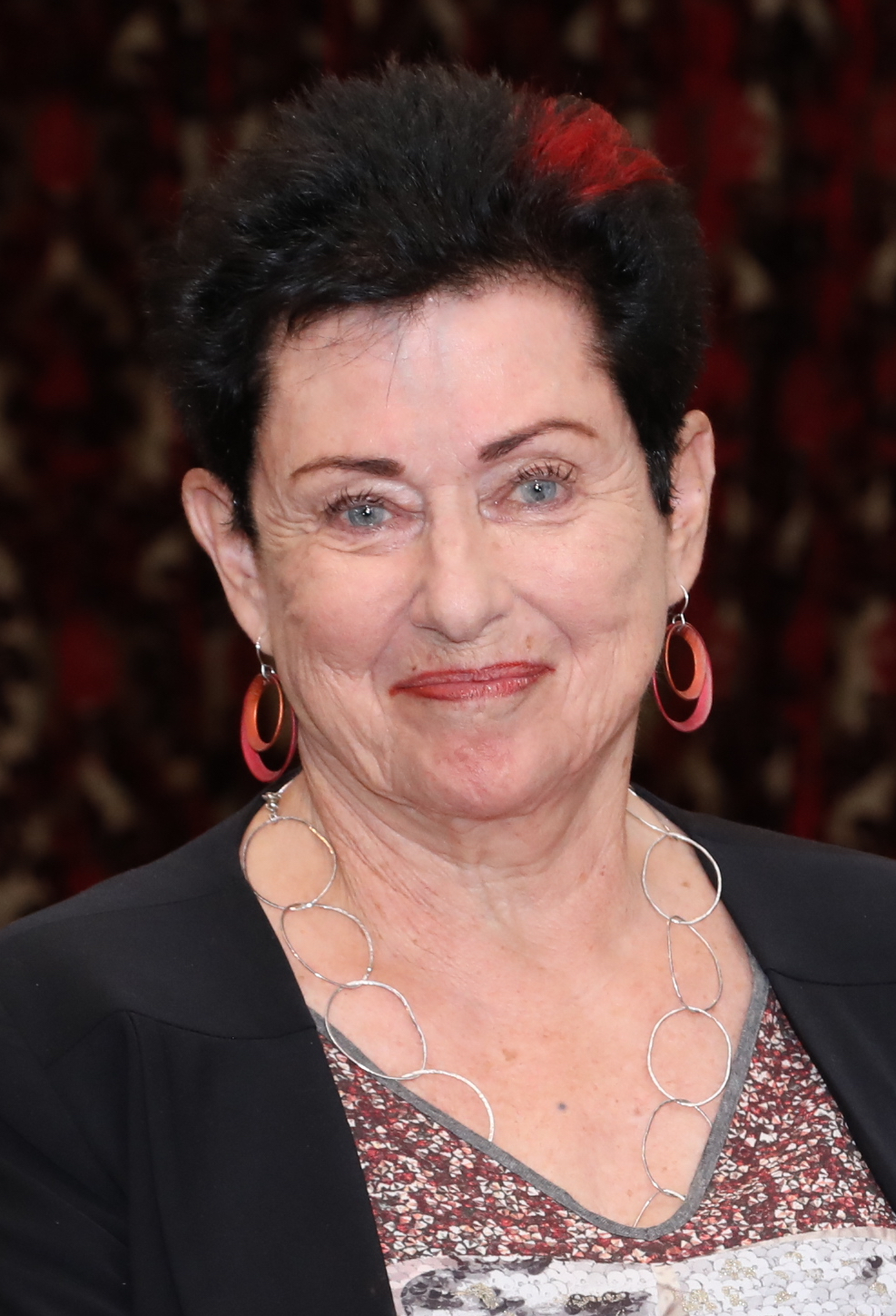
Shirley Horrocks

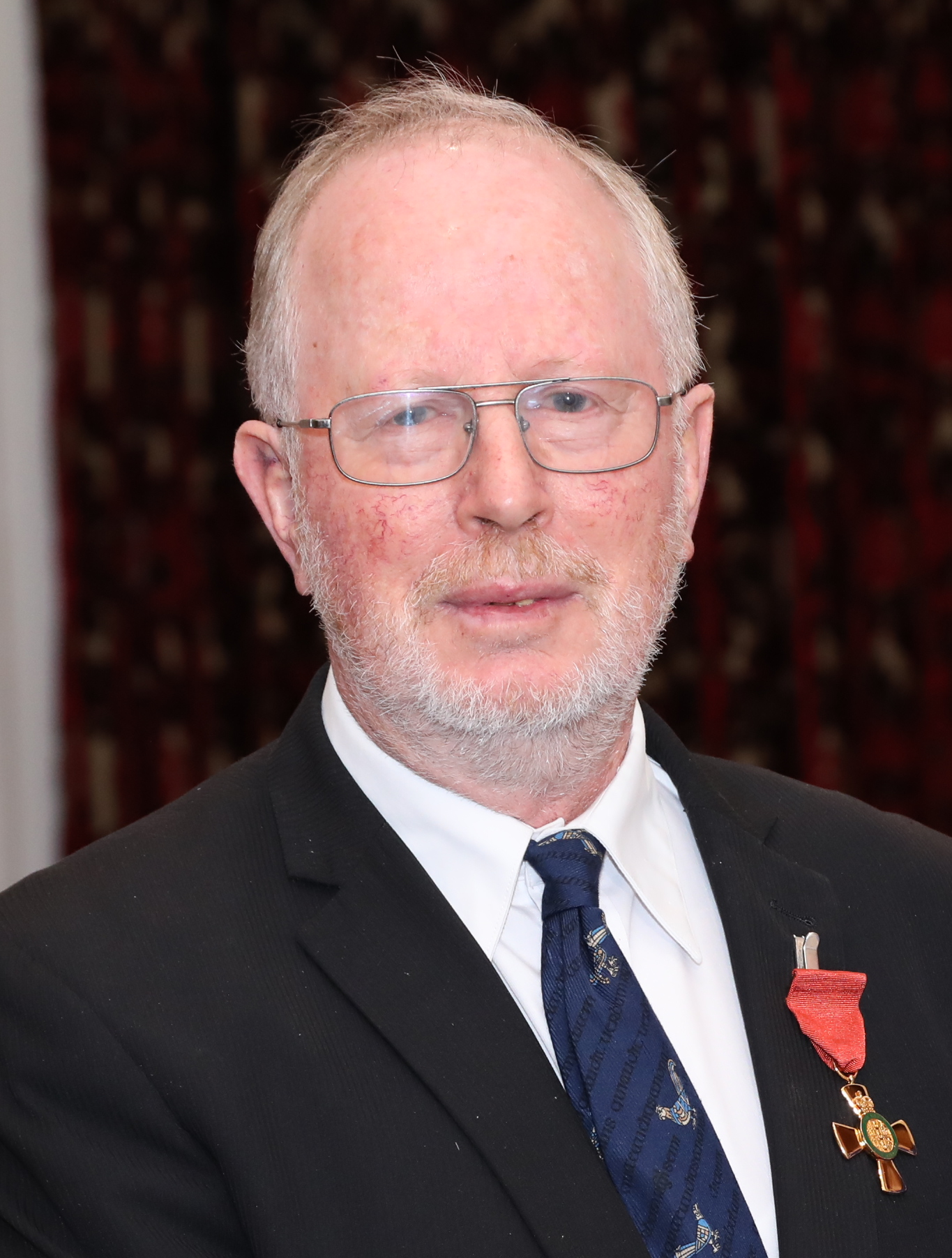
Mike Johnston

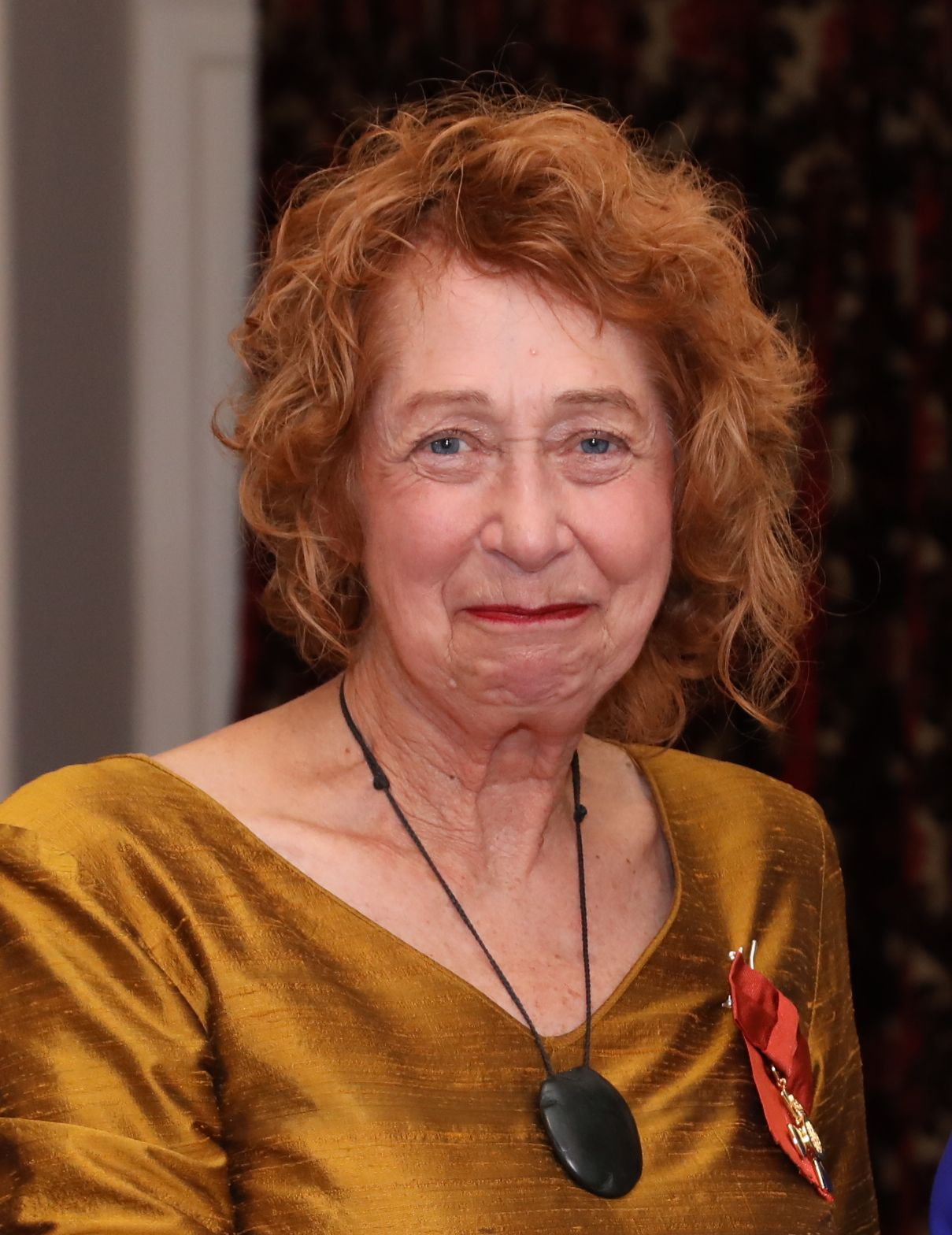
Di Lucas

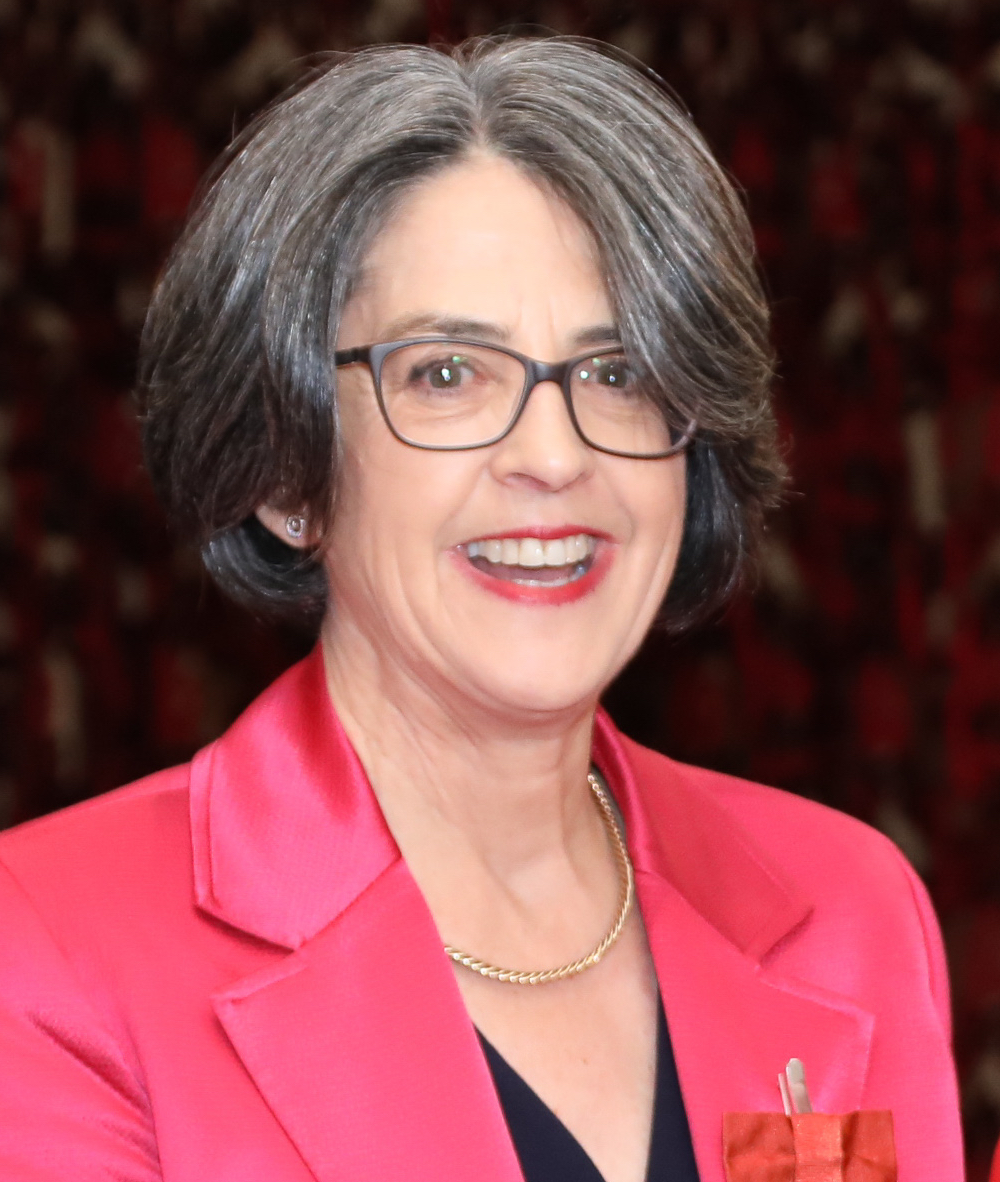
Kristy McDonald

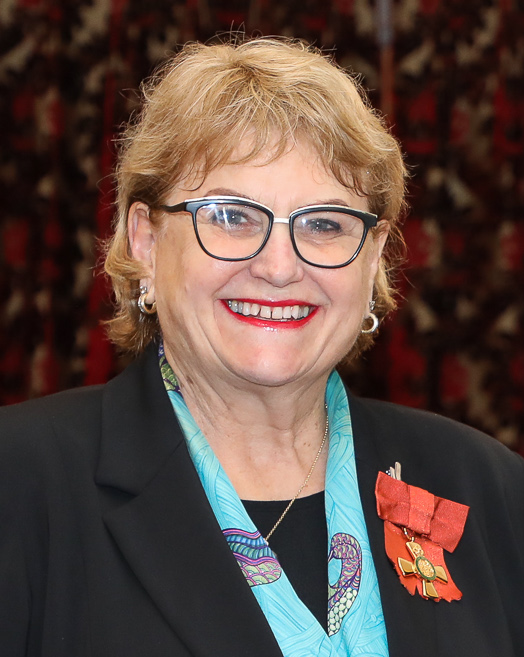
Jenny McMahon

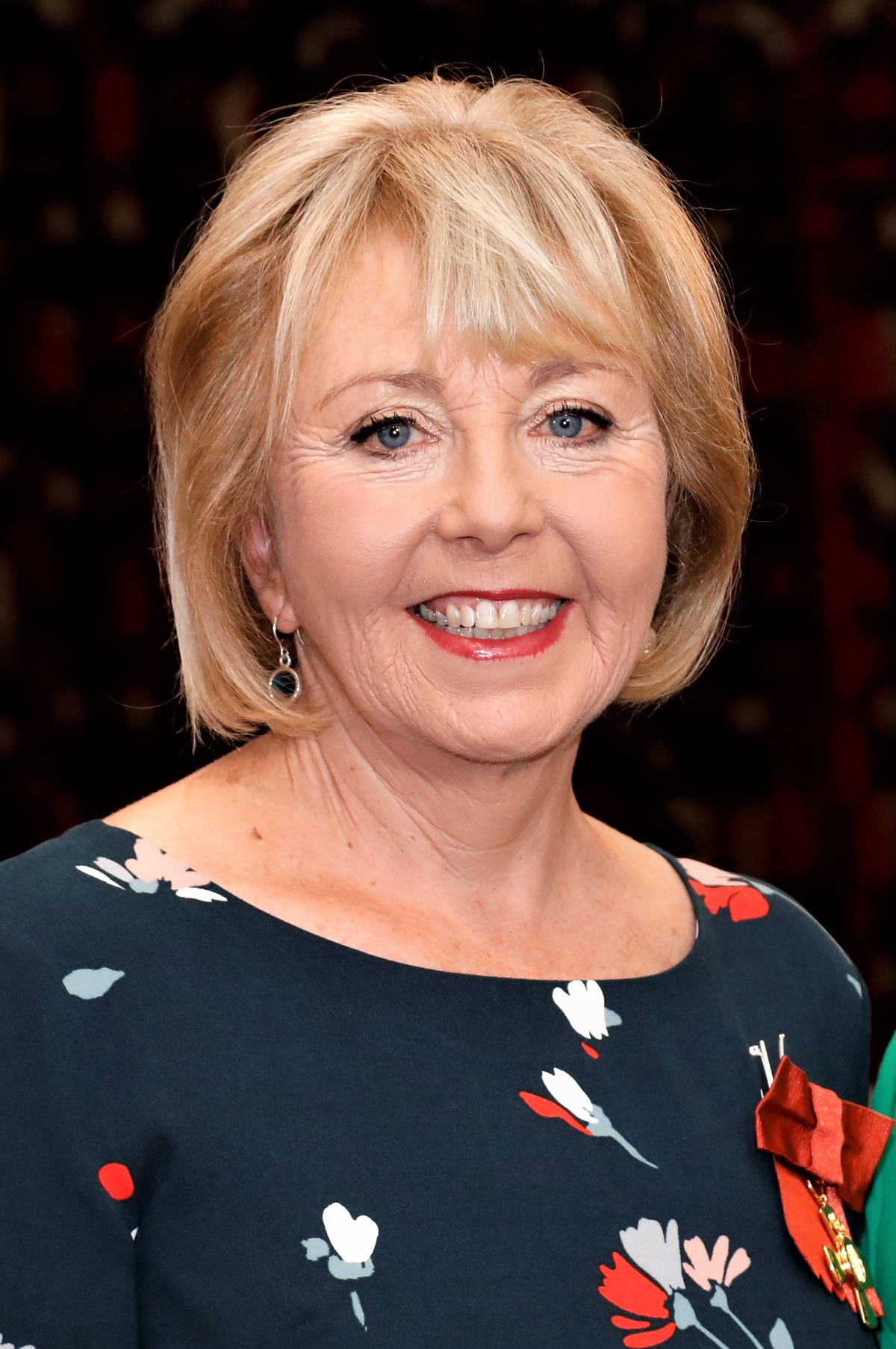
Maryanne Tipler

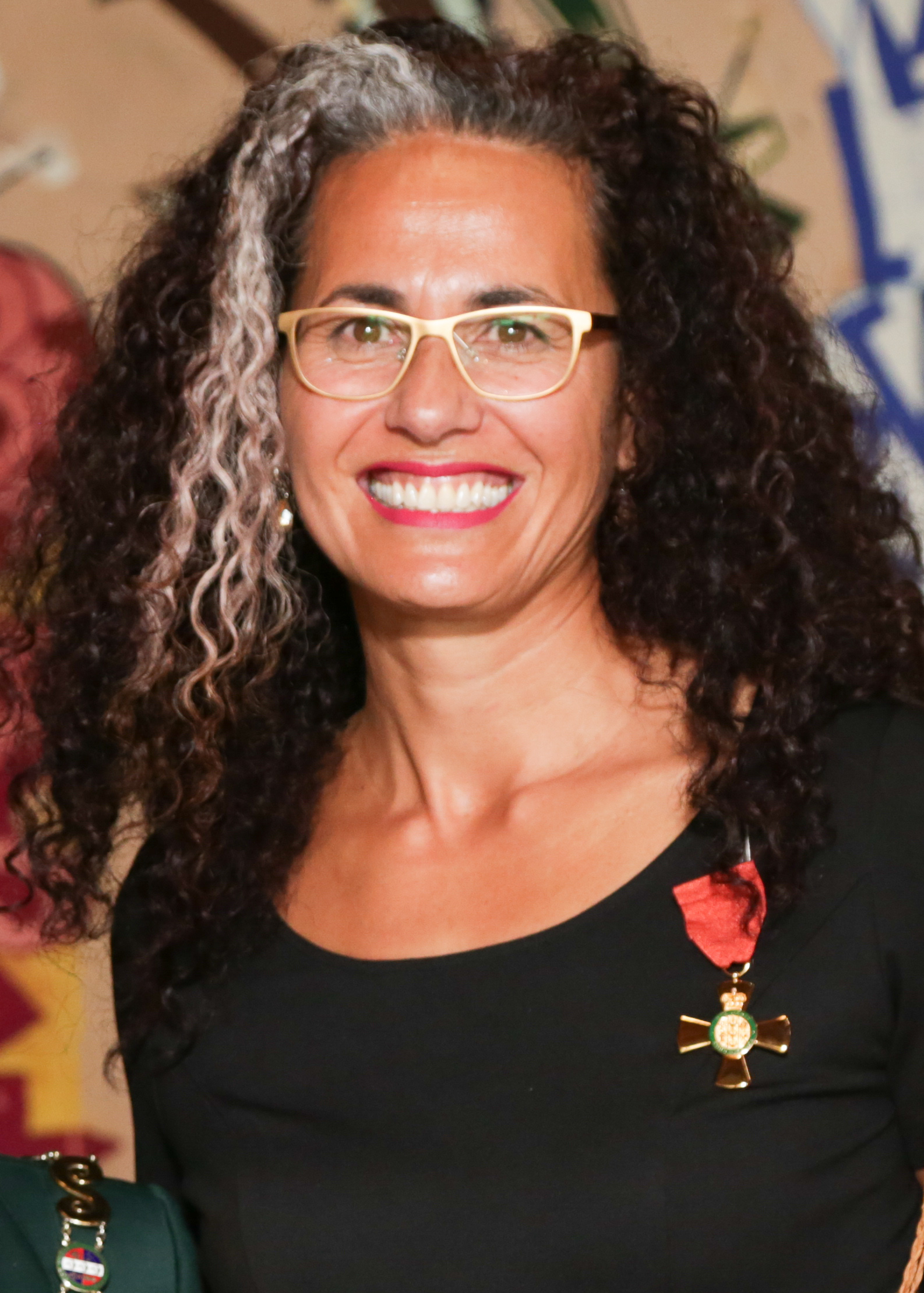
Selina Tusitala Marsh

=== Member (MNZM) ===
- Vaine Arai Areora – of Auckland. For services to the Cook Islands community and sport.
- Glenn Thomas Ashby – of McCrae, Australia. For services to sailing.
- Luisa Avaiki – of Auckland. For services to rugby league.
- Quentin Mountfield Bennett – of Napier. For services to optometry, diving and conservation.
- Carole Anne Beu – of Auckland. For services to the literary industry.
- Edmund Bohan – of Christchurch. For services to music, historical research and literature.
- Robert Allan Brooke – of Auckland. For services to education and heritage preservation.
- Valerie Ann Burrell – of Te Puke. For services to the community and horticulture.
- Associate Professor Andrew Brian Connolly – of Auckland. For services to health.
- Malcolm Cowie – of Auckland. For services to football.
- Rae Crossley Croft – of Auckland. For services as a violinist.
- Ingrid Joy Culliford – of Whanganui. For services to music and education.
- Rex Clifton Davy – of Auckland. For services to rugby and the community.
- Gina Rosanne Dellabarca – of Auckland. For services to the film industry.
- Paul Vincent Ellis – of Christchurch. For services to music.
- Lani Beth Evans – of Porirua. For services to social enterprise.
- Annette Cherie Fale – of Auckland. For services to youth and Pacific peoples.
- Tanu Daniel Gago – of Auckland. For services to art and the LGBTIQ+ community.
- Barry Robert Gardiner – of Christchurch. For services to sport, particularly squash.
- Rosalie Maria Goldsworthy – of Palmerston. For services to wildlife conservation.
- Glen Norman Green – of Auckland. For services to youth and sport.
- Elizabeth Sarah Harford – of Lower Hutt. For services to palliative care.
- Sergeant Arthur John Harris – of Invercargill. For services to the New Zealand Police and the community.
- Dr Rosemary Collinge Hipkins – of Kāpiti. For services to science education.
- Alan Frank Hitchens – of Tauranga. For services to journalism and the community.
- Daphne Annette Hull QSM – of Alexandra. For services to tourism and recreation.
- Denise Pamela Hutchins ED – of Nelson. For services as a justice of the peace and to the health sector.
- Gerda Christine Sophie Johnson (Kitty Johnson) – of Hastings. For services to outdoor recreation and support for people with multiple sclerosis.
- Professor Barbara Alison Jones – of Auckland. For services to education and sociology research.
- Ruxmani Vanmali Kasanji – of Wellington. For services to the Indian community.
- Laurie Tamati Ngarue Sadler Keung (Laurie Wharemate-Keung) – of Auckland. For services to children.
- Elizabeth Mary King – of Auckland. For services to aviation.
- Wana Joelle King – of Cambridge. For services to squash.
- Bogyung Ko (Lydia Ko) – of Kissimmee, Florida, United States of America. For services to golf.
- Margaret Joy Kouvelis – of Palmerston North. For services to local government and education.
- Roberta Hannah Laraman – of Cromwell. For services to tourism and heritage preservation.
- Joan Lardner-Rivlin QSM – of Auckland. For services to seniors.
- Professor Peter James Lineham – of Auckland. For services to religious history and the community.
- Peter Stevenson Little – of Carterton. For services to Māori land development and administration.
- Fay Looney – of New Plymouth. For services to the arts, particularly photography.
- Vinka Dragica Lucas – of Auckland. For services to the fashion industry and design.
- Terry Isobel MacTavish – of Dunedin. For services to theatre and education.
- Vivien Rae Maidaborn – of Wellington. For services to human rights and social entrepreneurship.
- Heidi Melissa Mardon – of Hamilton. For services to environmental education.
- Celeste Mojo Mathers – of Geraldine. For services to people with disabilities.
- Professor Tracey Kathleen Dorothy McIntosh – of Auckland. For services to education and social science.
- Dr Karlo Estelle Mila – of Auckland. For services to the Pacific community and as a poet.
- Dr Arbutus Mitikulena – of Wellington. For services to health and the Pacific community.
- William Hugh Moran – of Queenstown. For services to the State, sport and youth.
- Jennifer Patricia Morris OAM – of Potts Point, Australia. For services to music and charity fundraising.
- Dr Paula Jane Kiri Morris – of Auckland. For services to literature.
- Simon George Mortlock – of Lyttelton. For services to the community and education.
- Dr Susan Mary Bennett Morton – of Auckland. For services to epidemiology and public health research.
- Philip James Newbury, – of Invercargill. For services to glass art.
- Pouroto Nicholas Hamilton Ngaropō JP – of Whakatāne. For services to Māori and governance.
- Thomas Michael O'Connor JP – of St Andrews. For services to seniors, local government and journalism.
- Kerry Louise Owen – of North Salt Lake, Utah, United States of America. For services to children.
- Raewyn Margery Peart – of Auckland. For services to environmental and conservation policy.
- Cushla-Mary Piesse – of Christchurch. For services to Highland dancing.
- Emeritus Professor Thomas Kenneth Prebble – of Palmerston North. For services to tertiary education.
- Anne Patricia Rodger – of Dunedin. For services to women.
- Georgina Hera Salter – of Oamaru. For services to netball. (Note: Deceased. Her Majesty's approval of this appointment took effect on 27 November 2018, prior to the date of decease.)
- Fiona Samuel – of Auckland. For services to television and theatre.
- Sharon Norma Shea – of Auckland. For services to Māori health and development.
- Professor Emeritus Ivan Augustine Snook – of Palmerston North. For services to education. (Note: Deceased. Her Majesty's approval of this appointment took effect on 18 October 2018, prior to the date of decease.)
- Paul Stanleigh Spiller – of Auckland. For services to chess.
- Wendy Sporle – of Kaitaia. For services to kiwi conservation.
- Karen Louise Staples – of Auckland. For services to the food industry.
- Dr James Robert Garfield Stewart – of Pauanui. For services to children with genetic immune deficiency disorders.
- Ava Marisha Strong – of Thames. For services to karate and the community.
- Lance Allan Strong – of Thames. For services to karate and the community.
- Vic Henery Tamati – of Auckland. For services to the prevention of family violence.
- Sharon Wallace Torstonson – of Christchurch. For services to the community.
- Tukua Turia – of Auckland. For services to Cook Islands art and culture.
- Elisabeth Vaneveld – of Auckland. For services to arts management.
- Mele Luisa Wendt – of Wellington. For services to governance, the Pacific community and women.
- Rosemary Maud Wildblood – of Porirua. For services to literature.
- Dr Siouxsie Wiles – of Auckland. For services to microbiology and science communication.
- Kerry-Jayne Wilson – of Charleston. For services to seabird conservation.
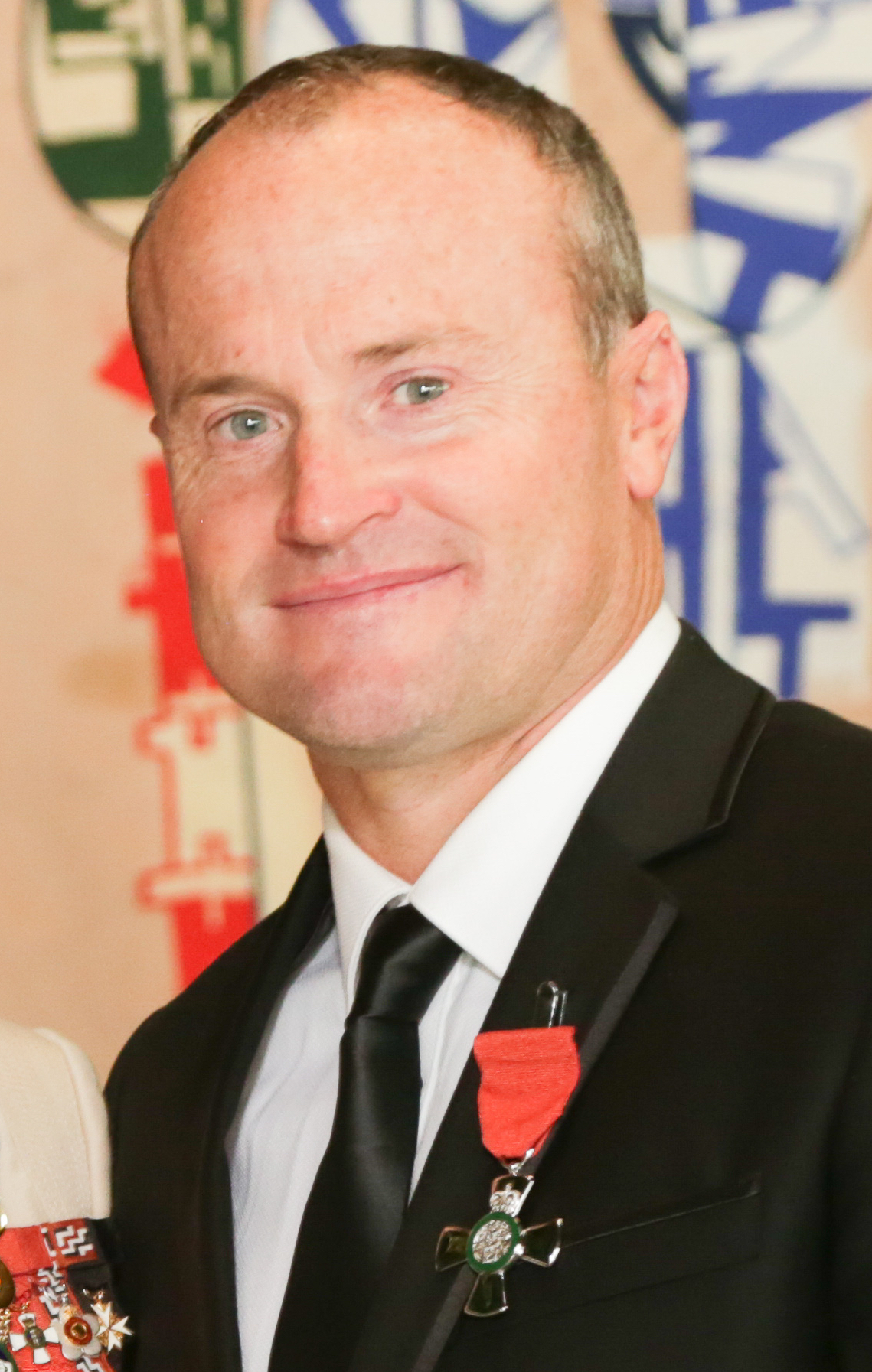
Glenn Ashby

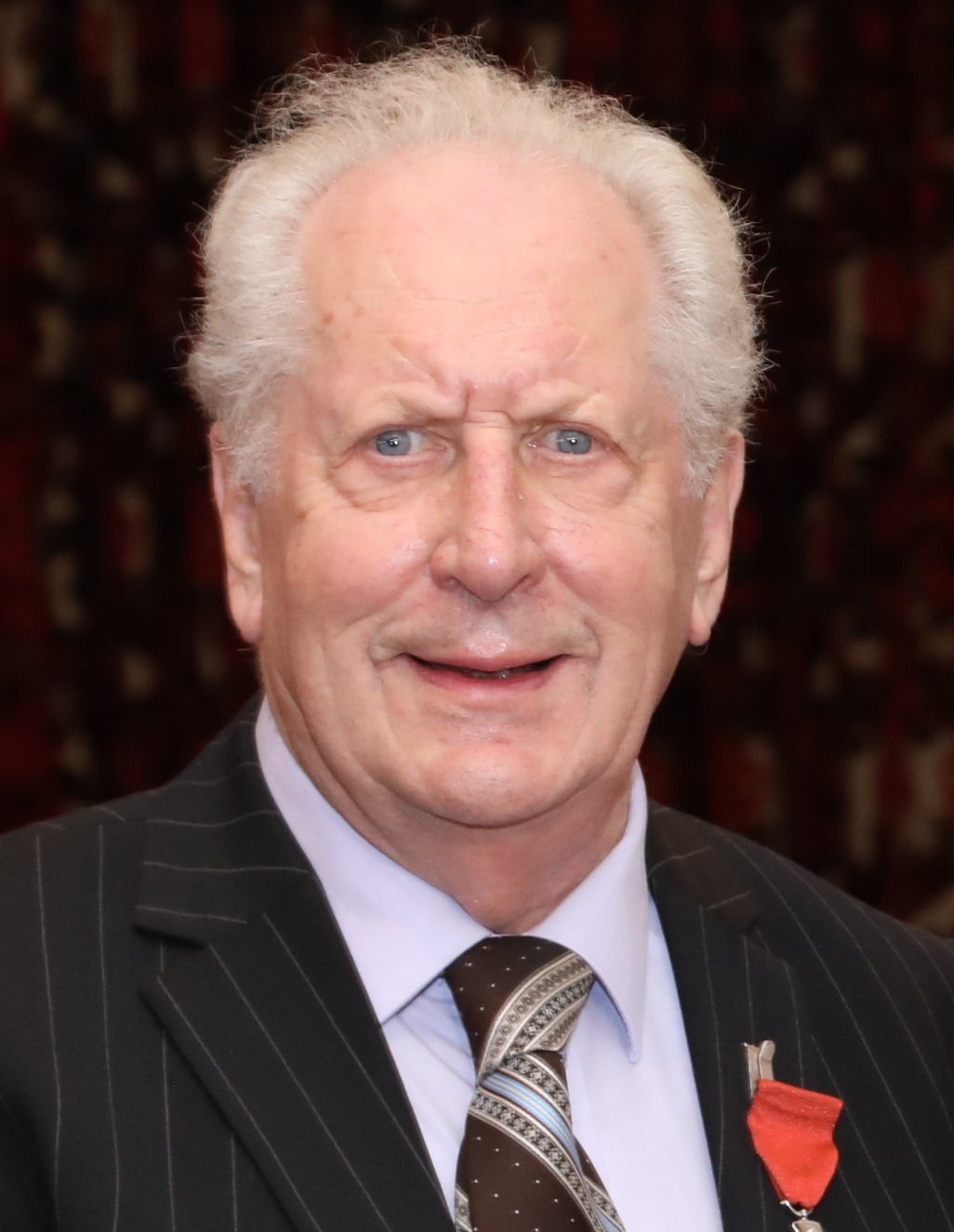
Edmund Bohan

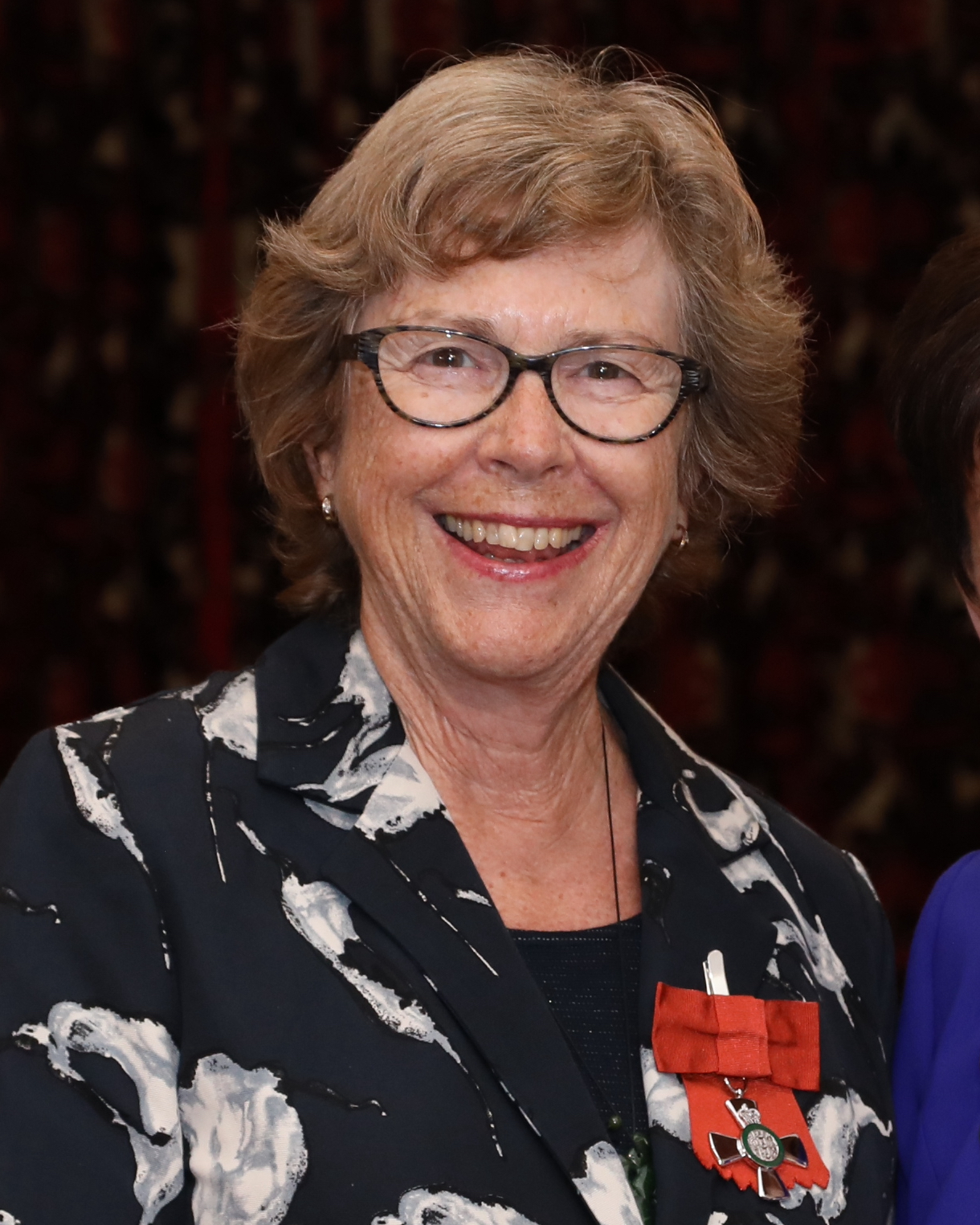
Rosemary Hipkins

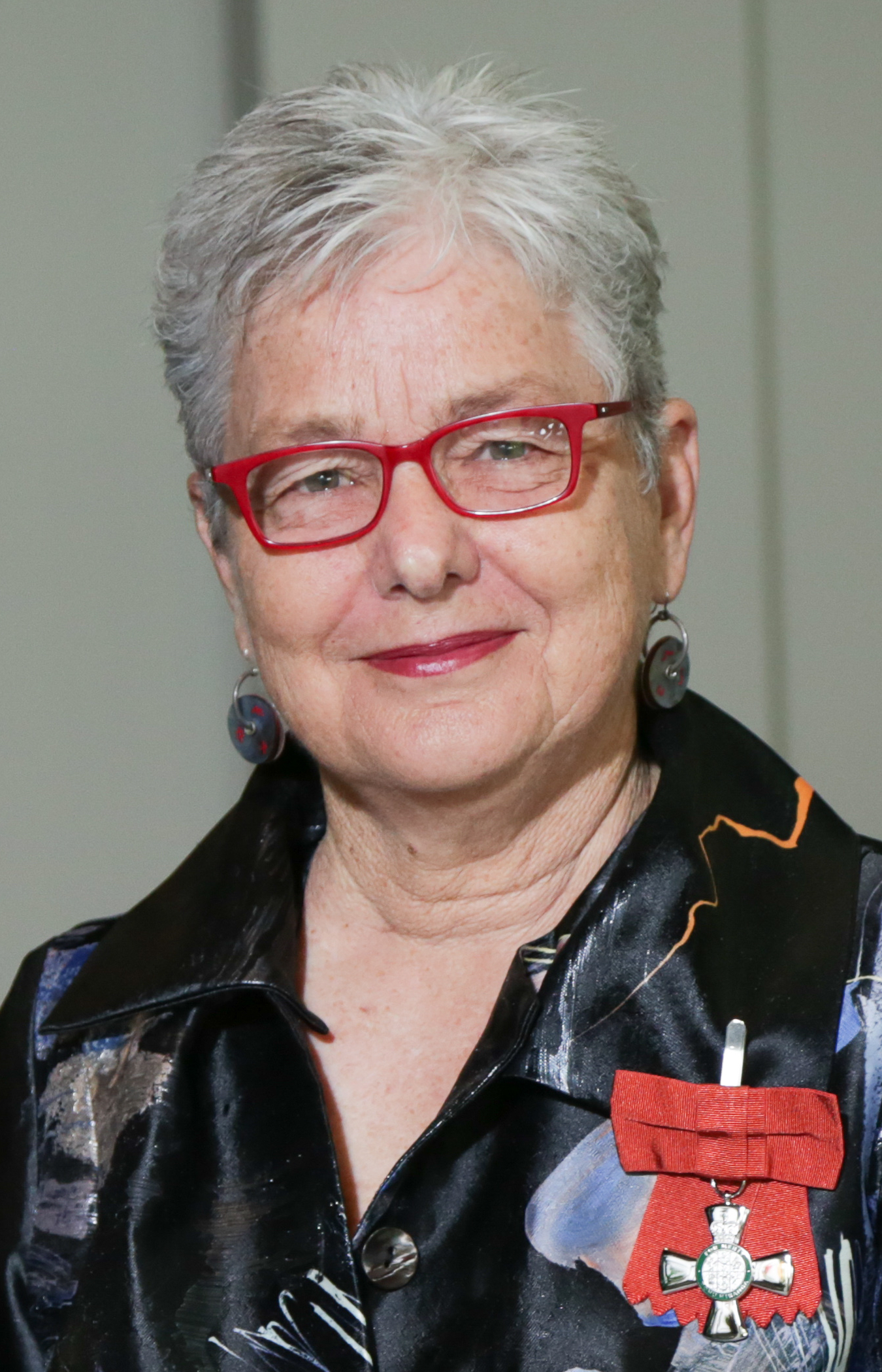
Alison Jones

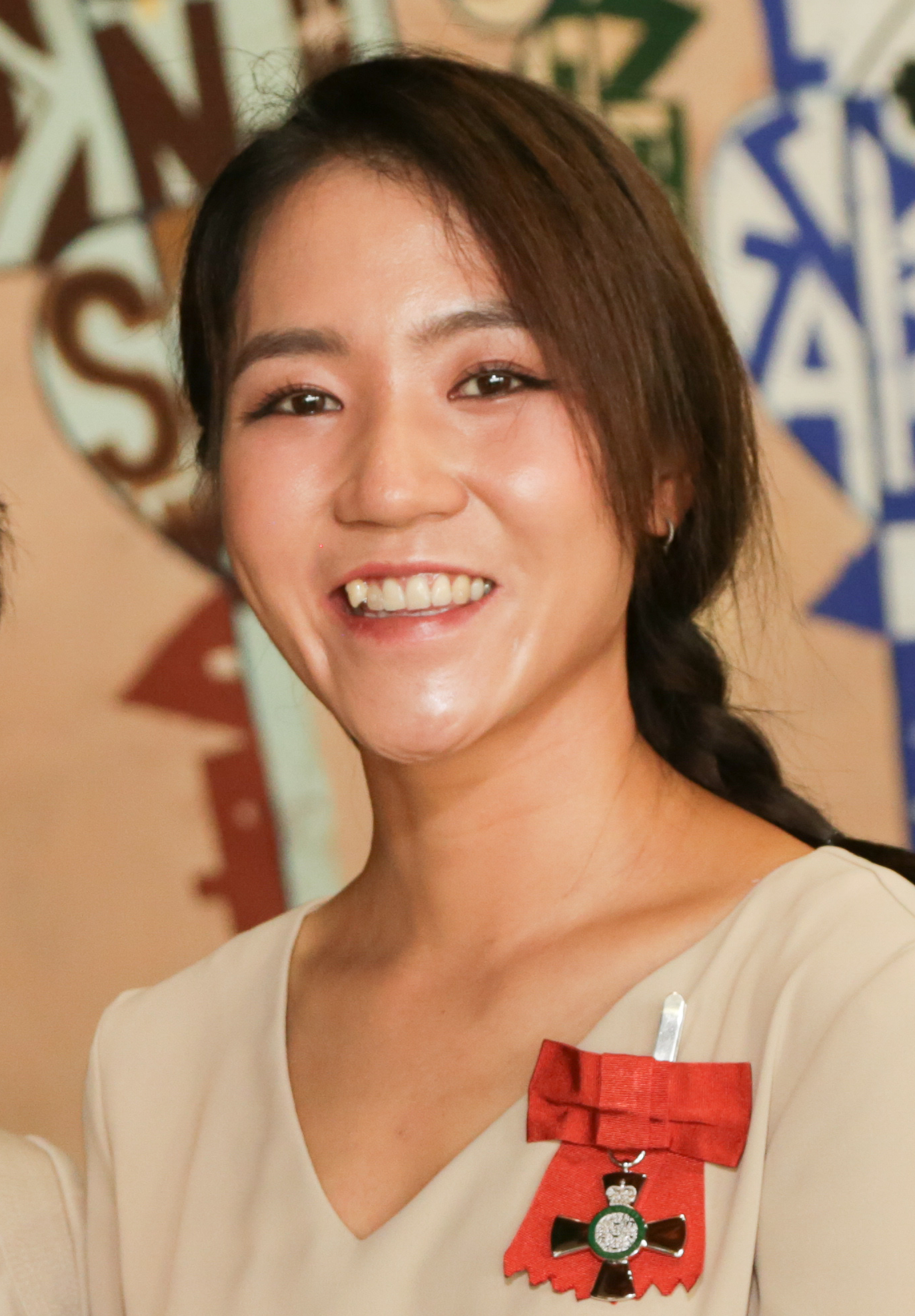
Lydia Ko

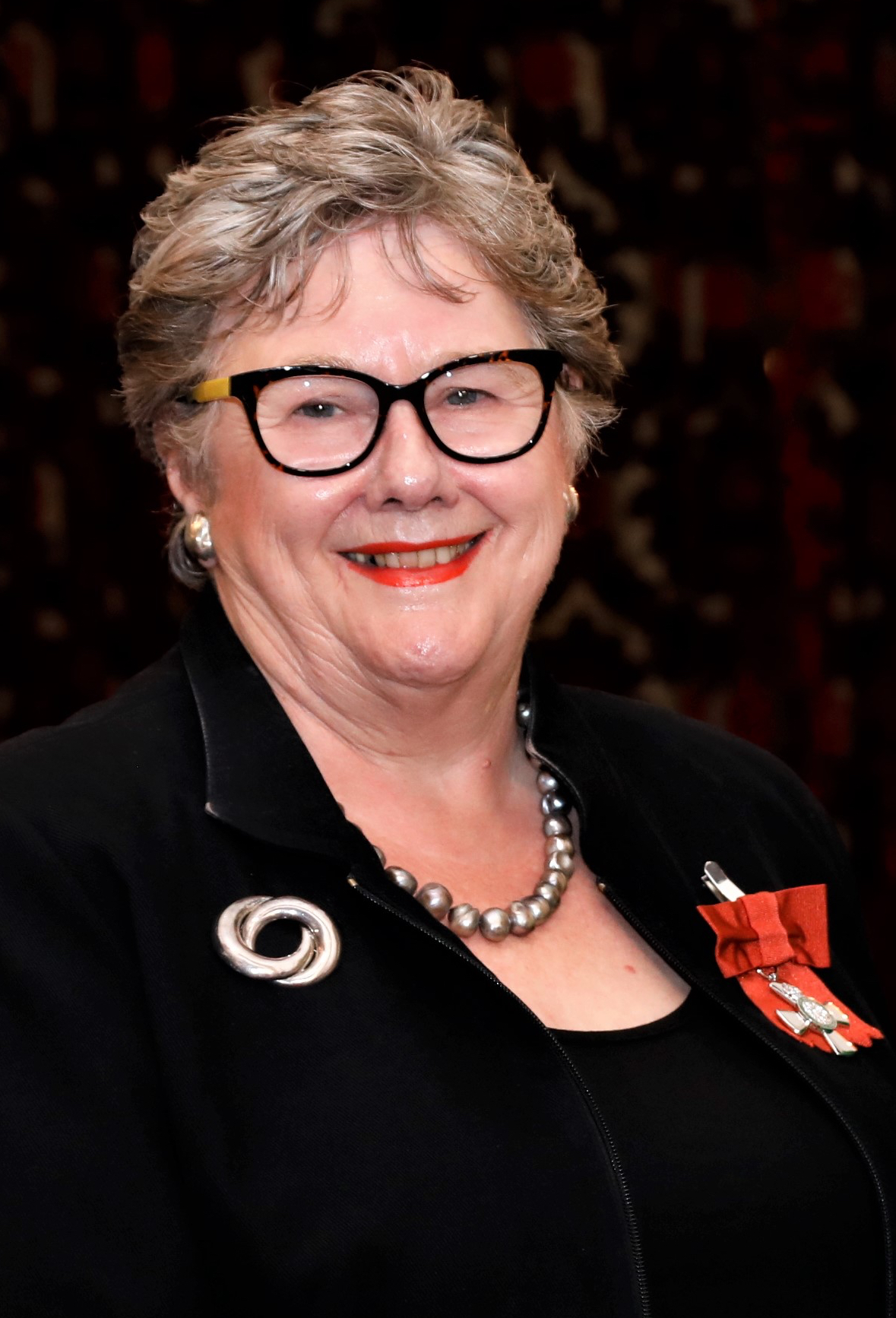
Margaret Kouvelis

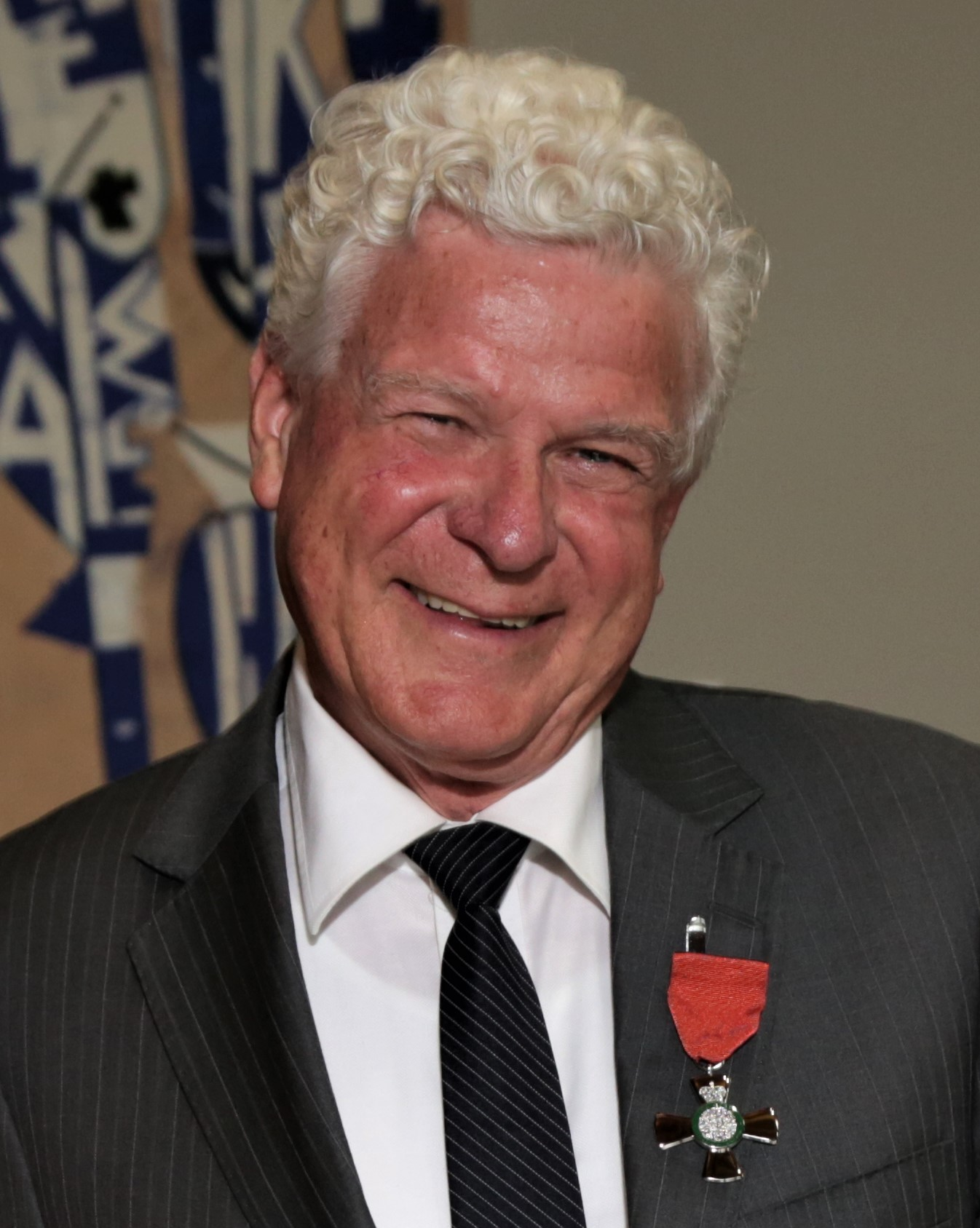
Peter Lineham

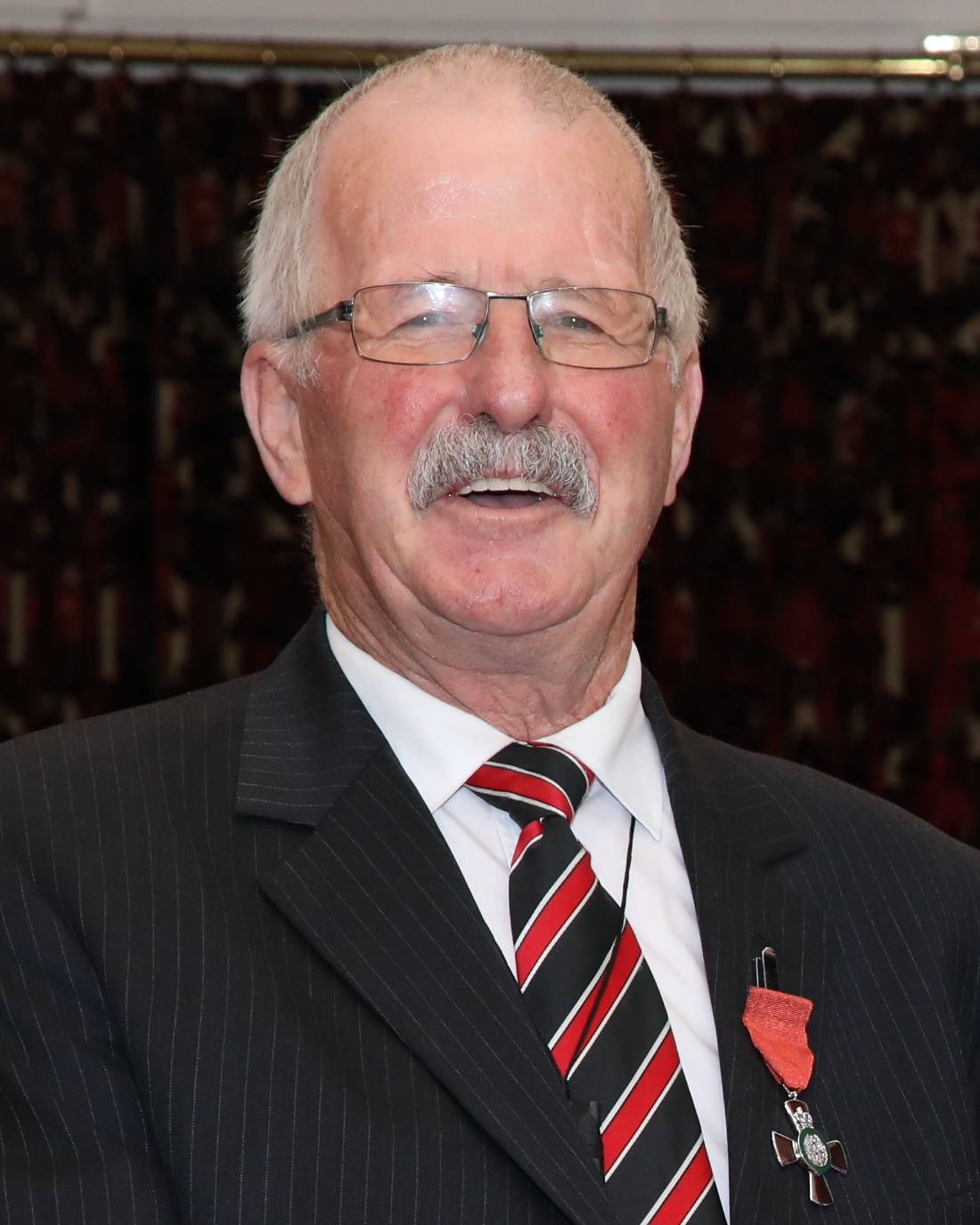
Peter Little

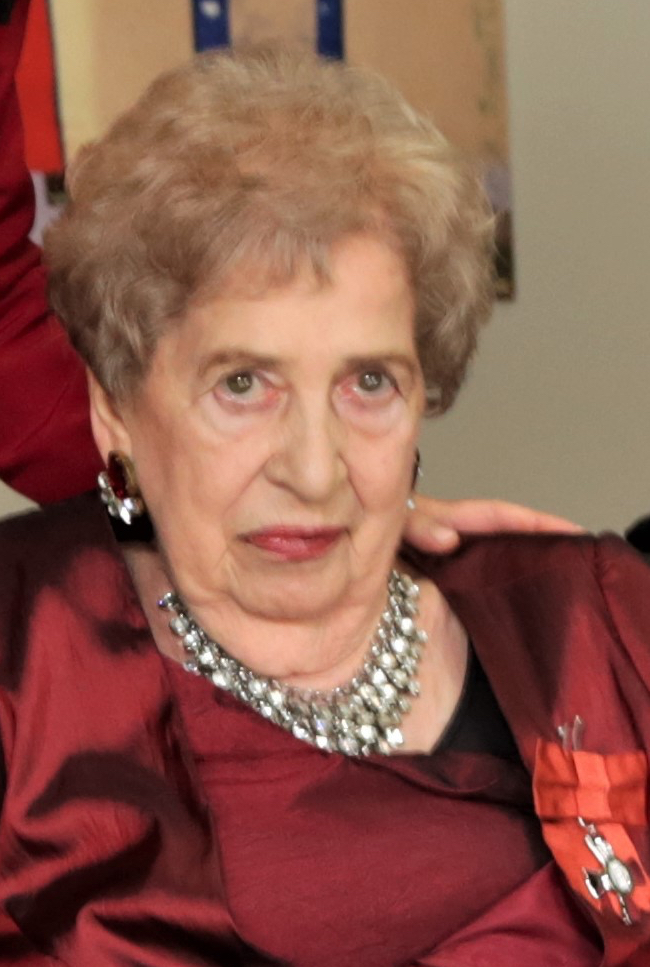
Vinka Lucas

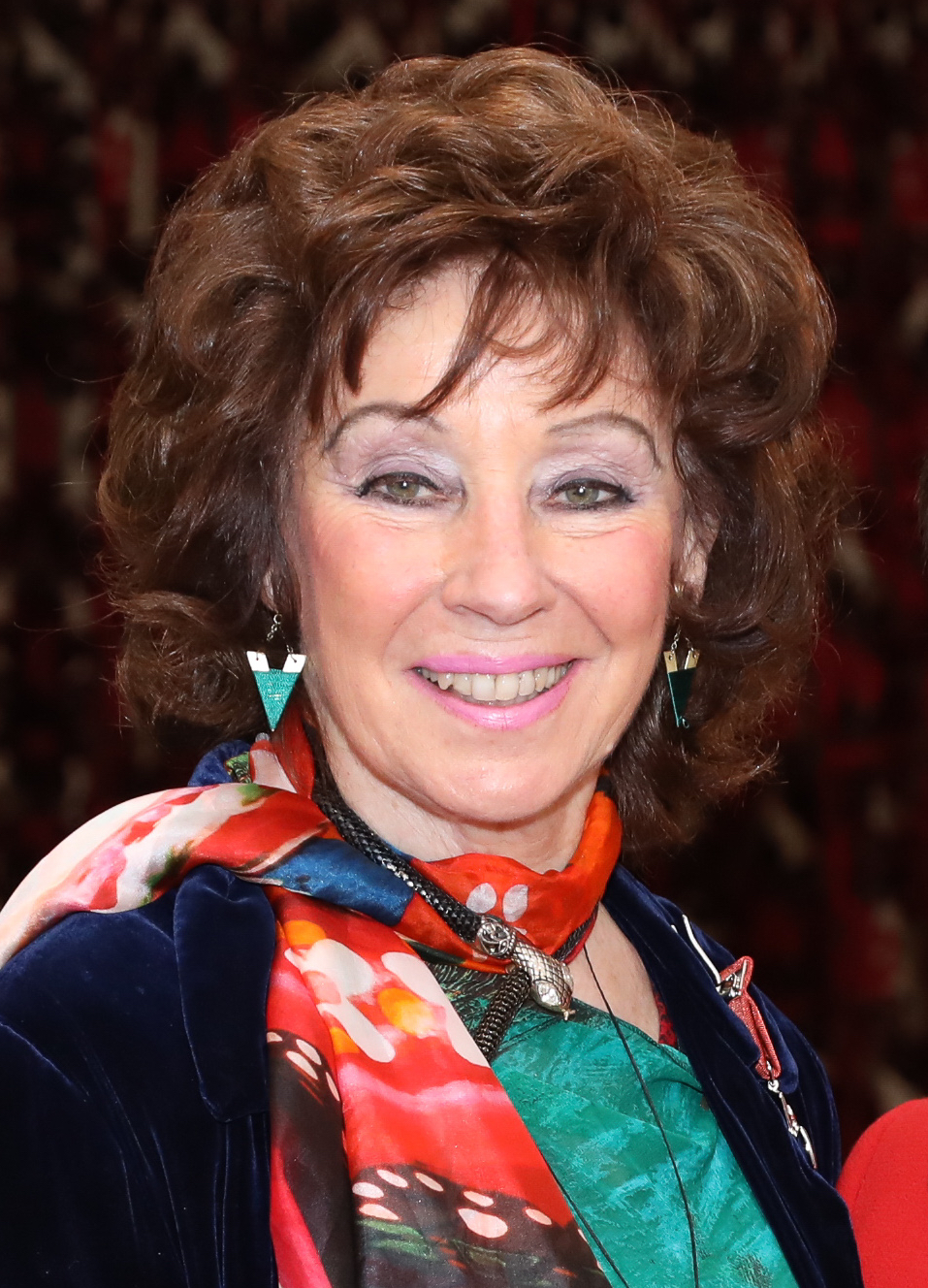
Terry MacTavish

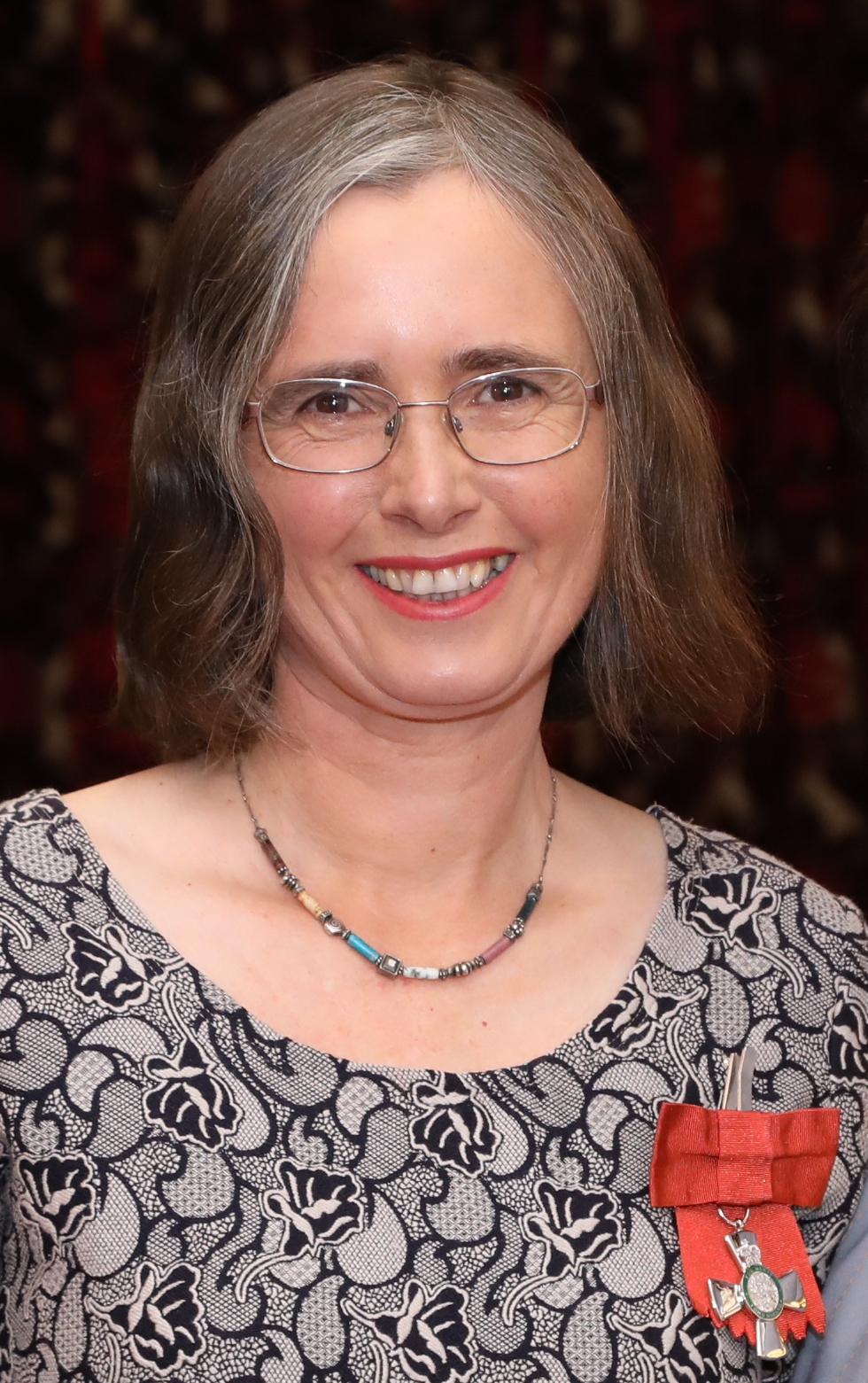
Mojo Mathers

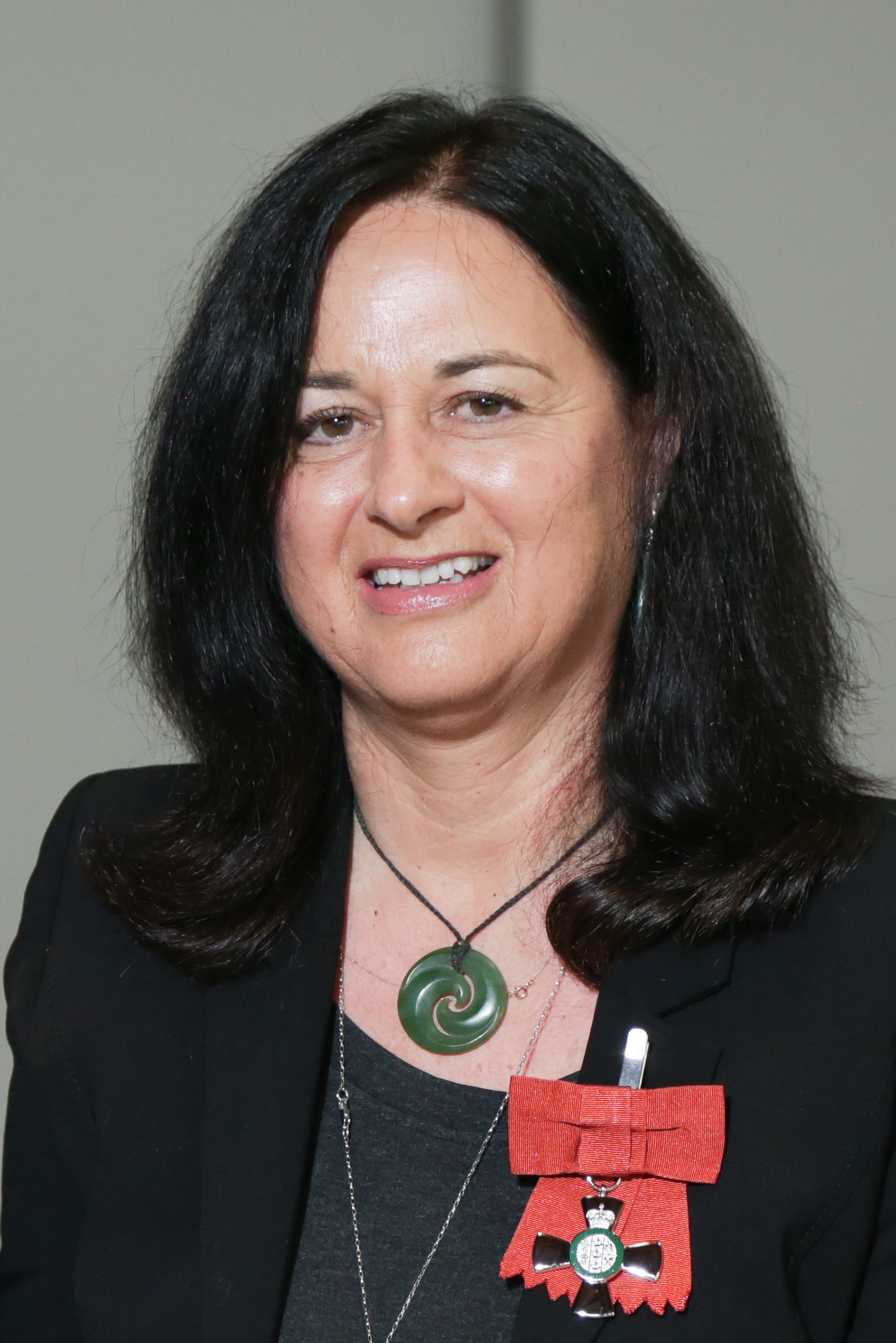
Tracey McIntosh

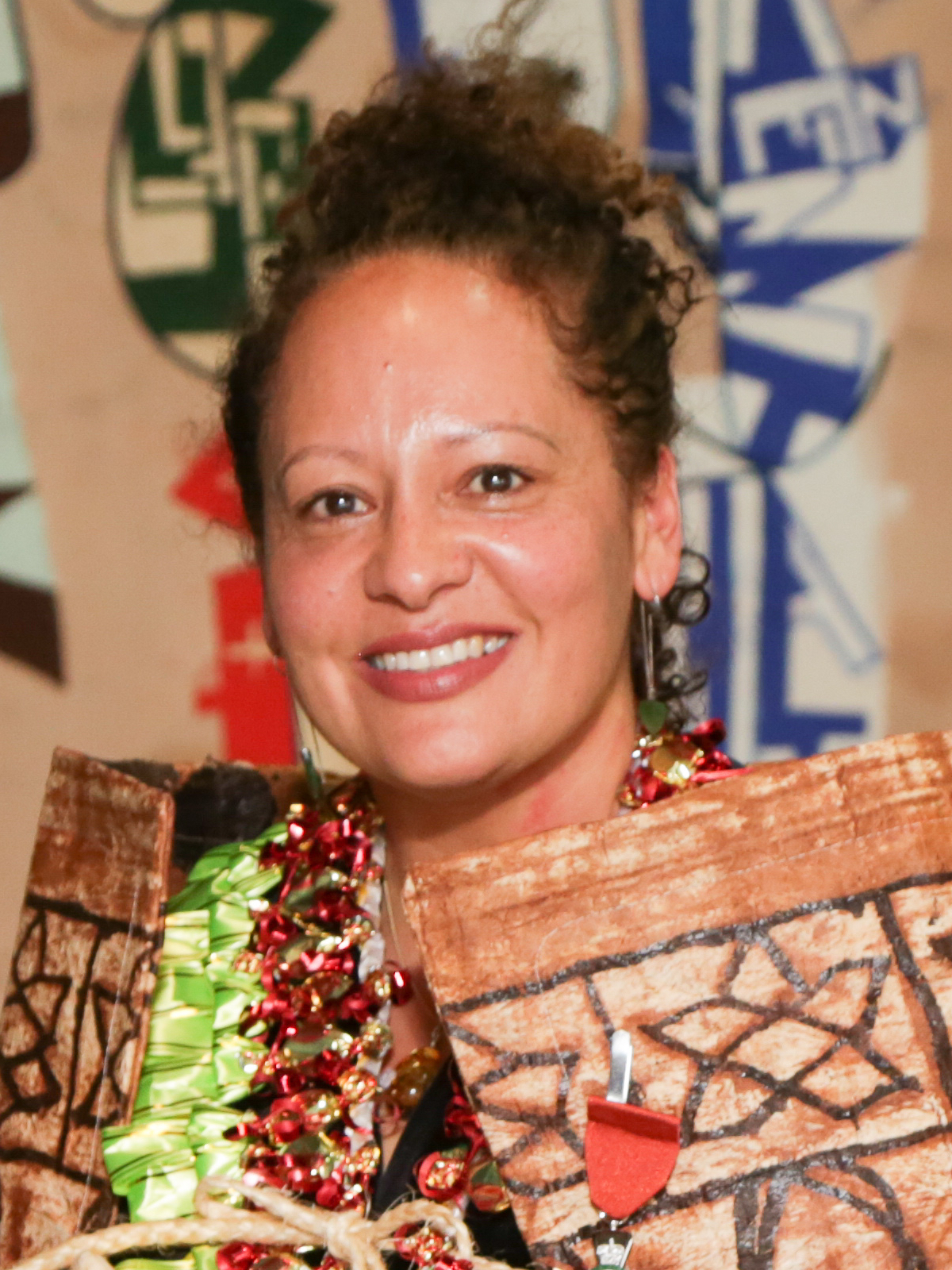
Karlo Mila

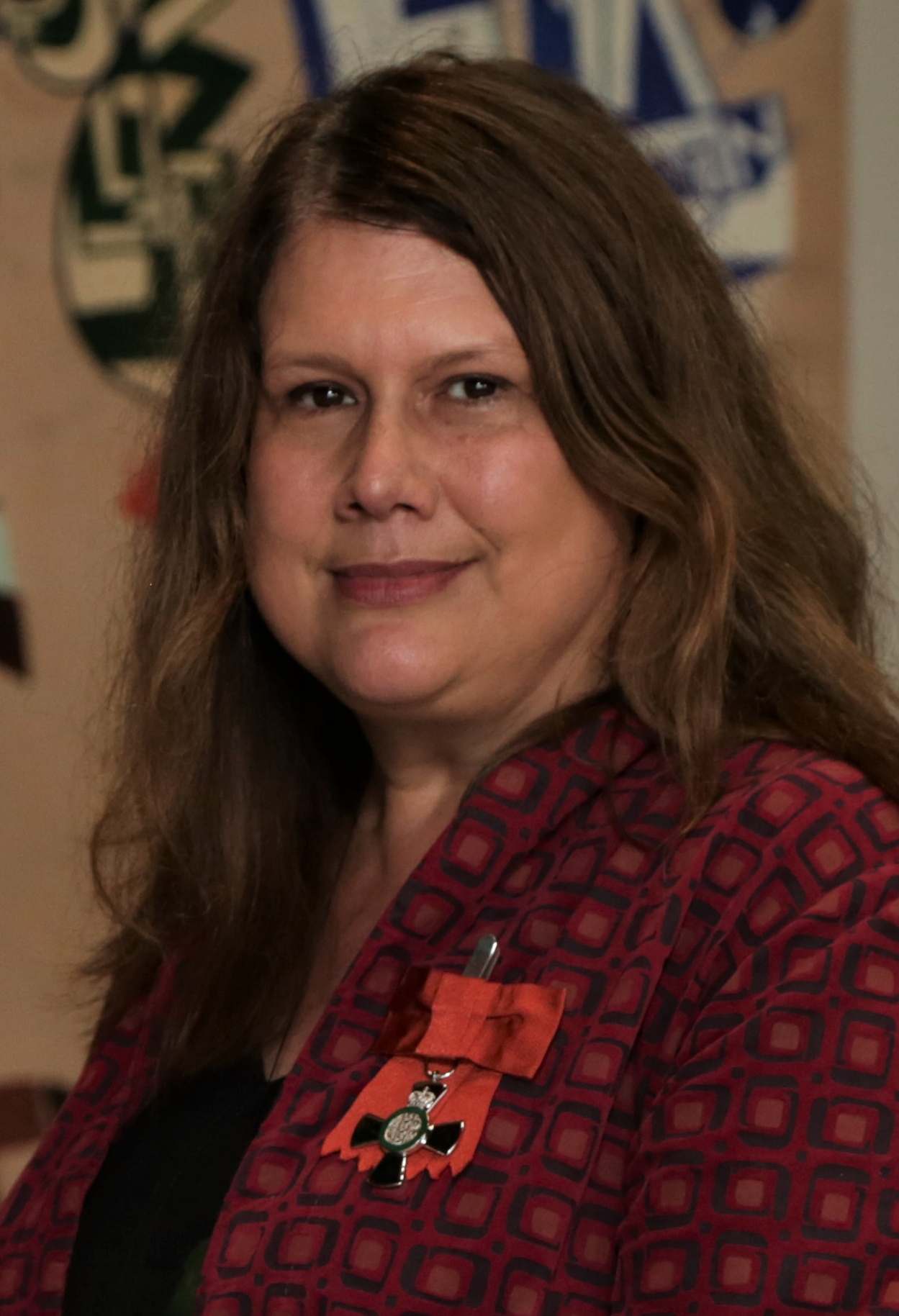
Paula Morris

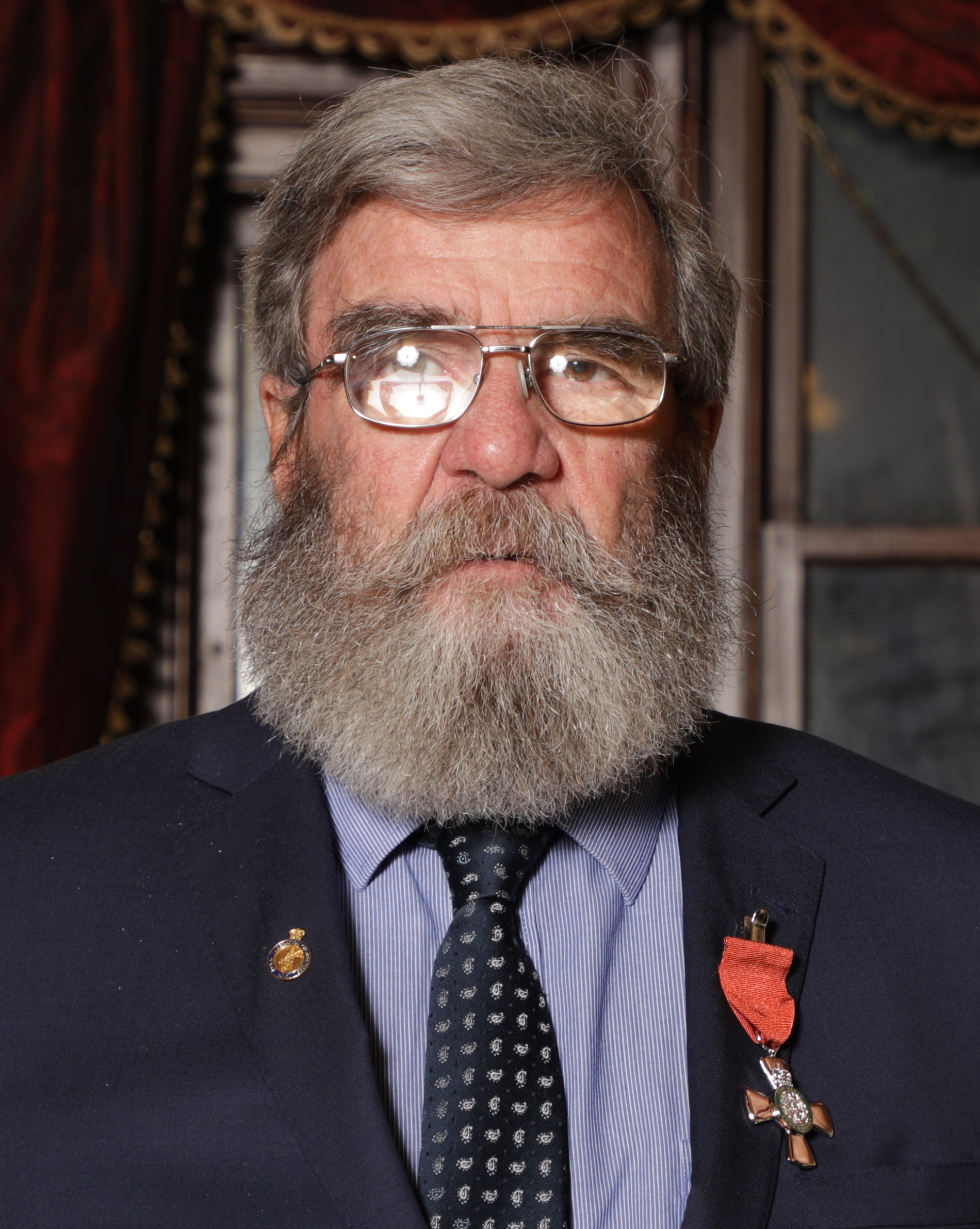
Tom O'Connor

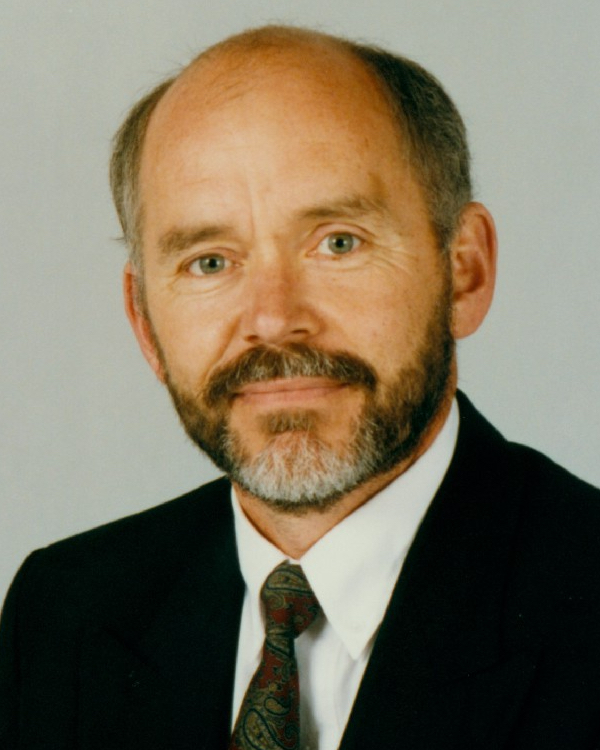
Tom Prebble

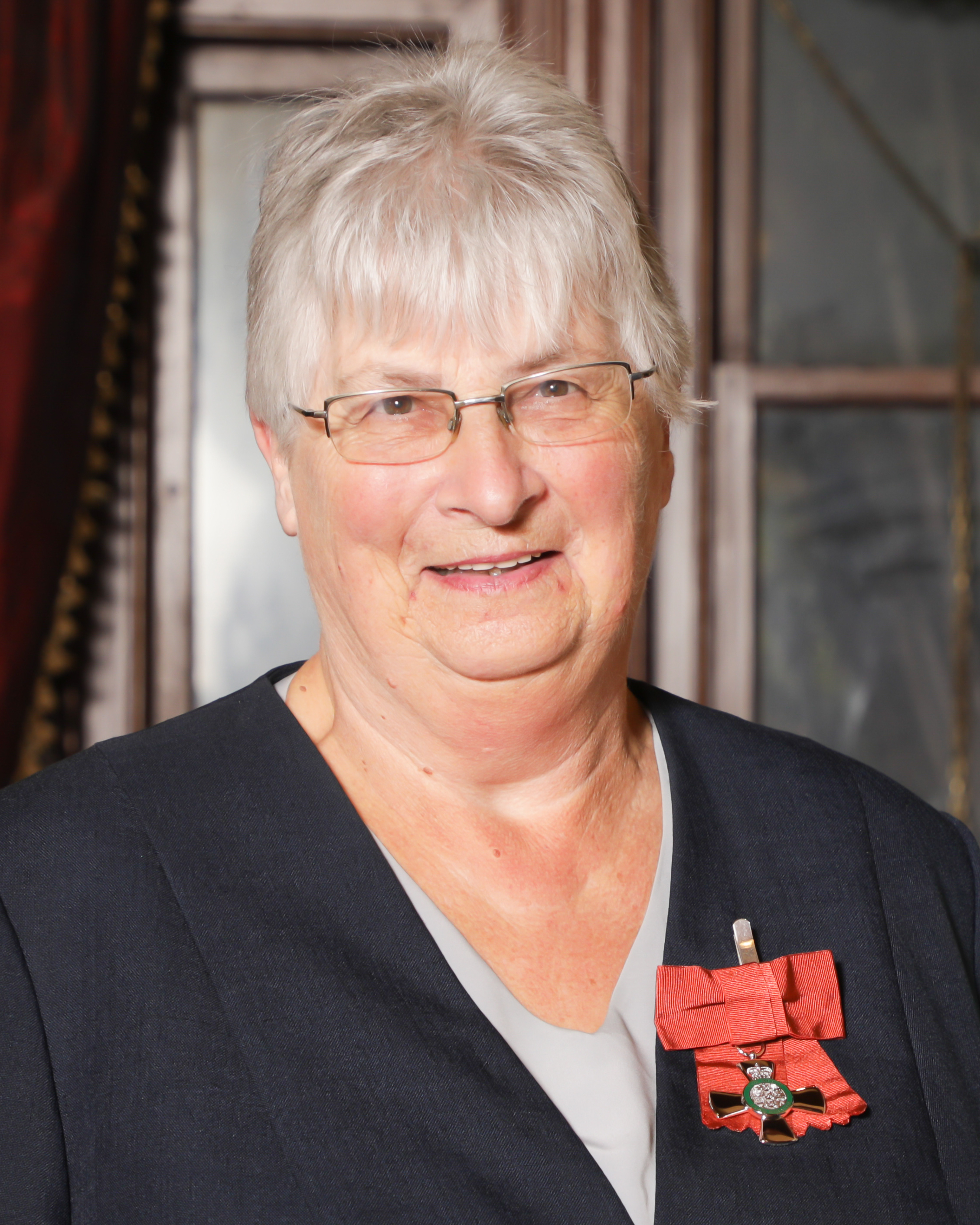
Anne Rodger

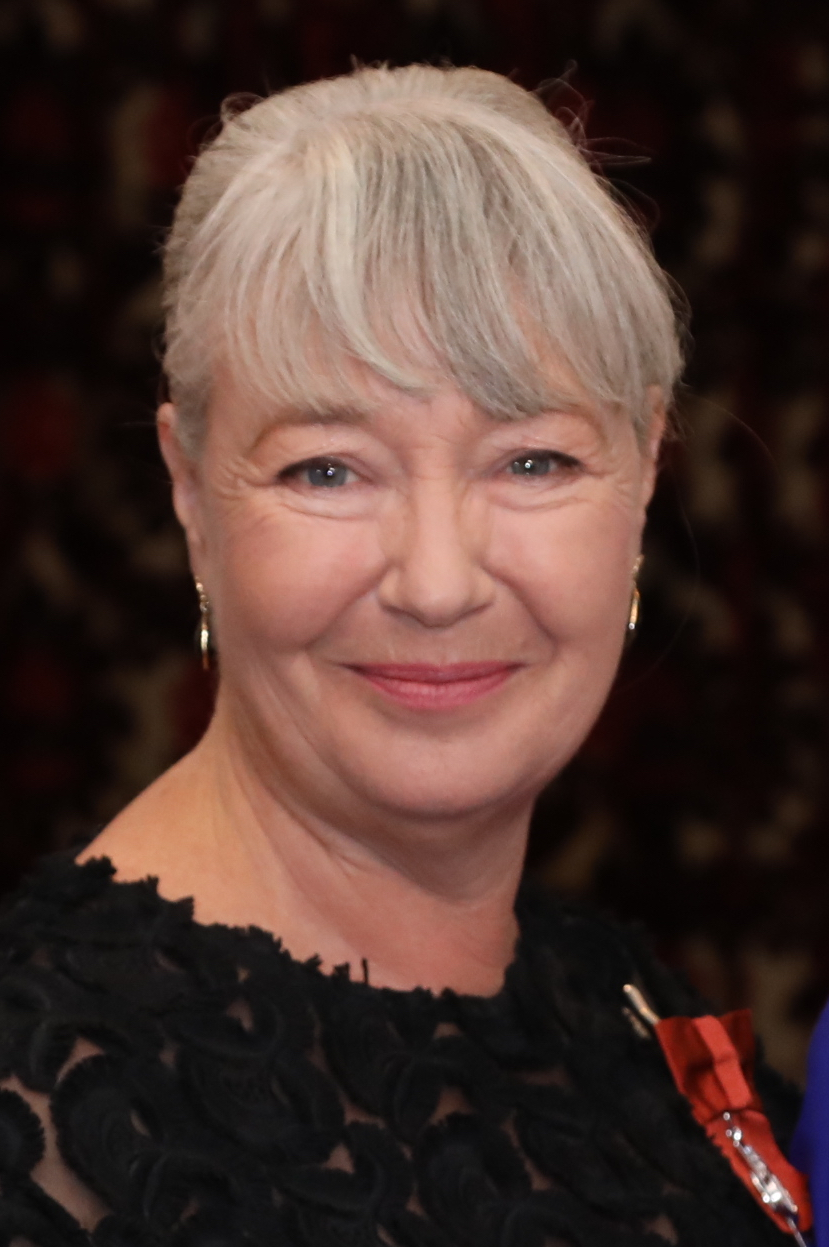
Fiona Samuel

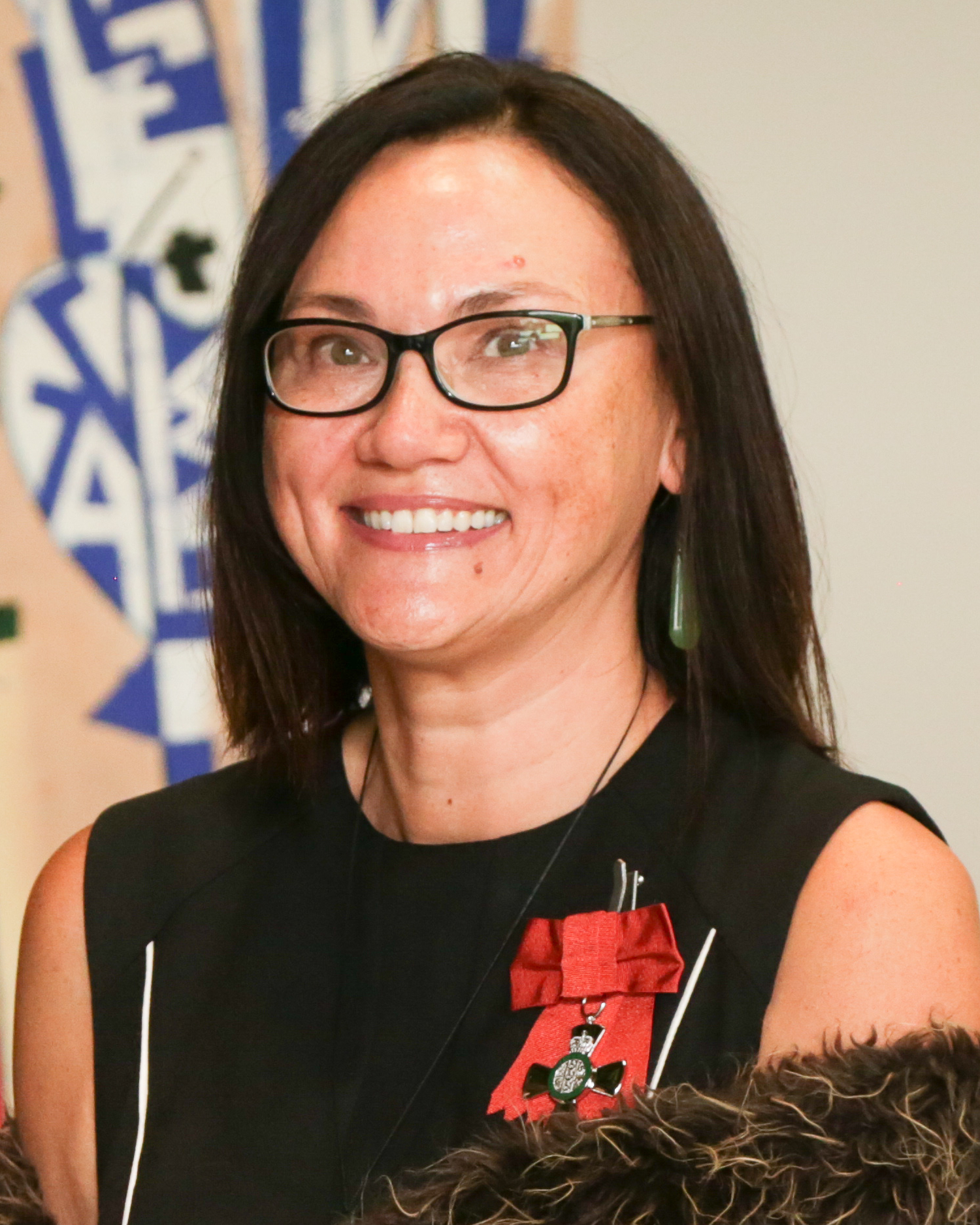
Sharon Shea

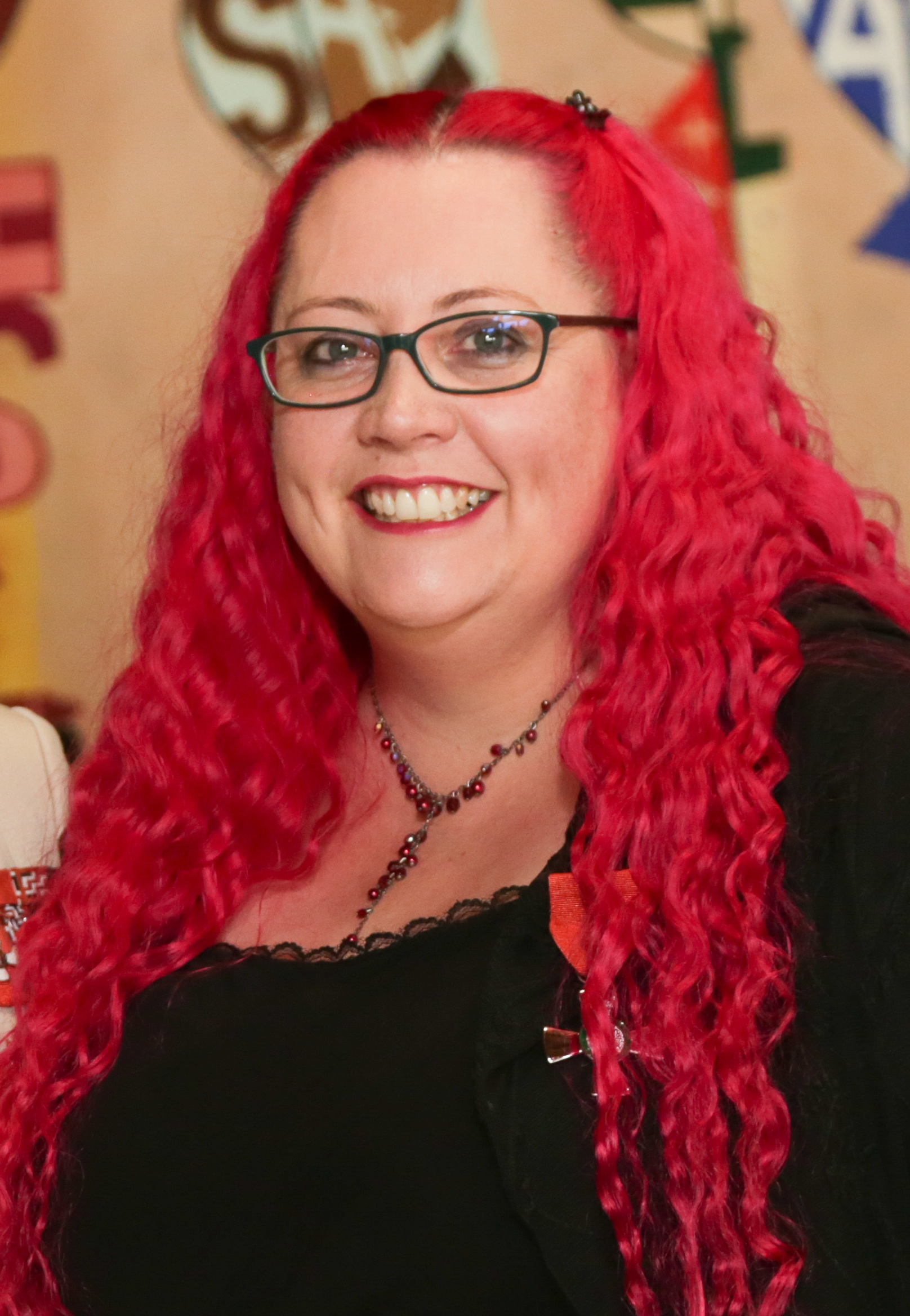
Siouxsie Wiles

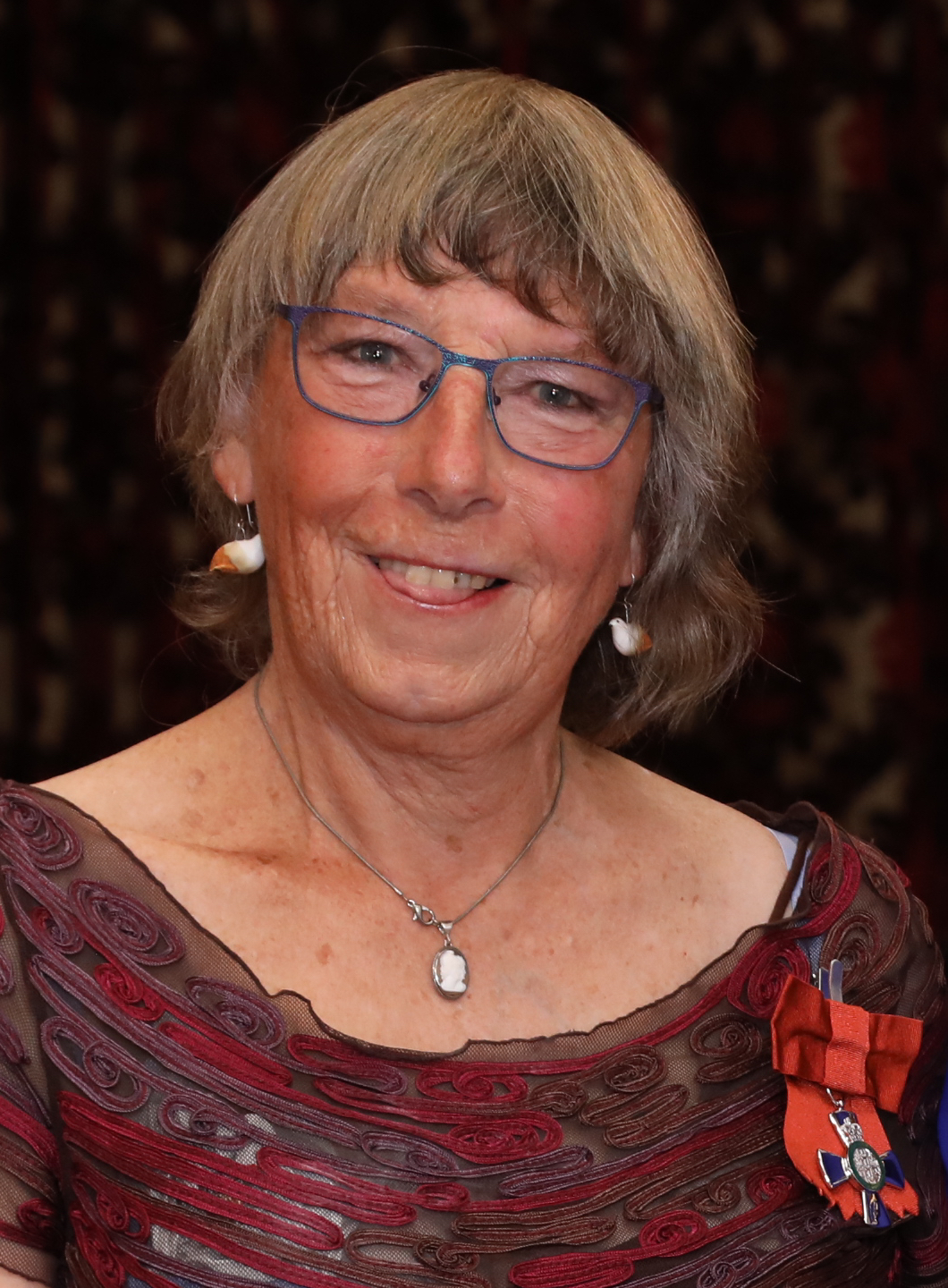
Kerry-Jayne Wilson

== Companion of the Queen's Service Order (QSO) ==
- Eleanor Anne Bodger – of Christchurch. For services to seniors.
- Martyn John Dunne CNZM – of Wellington. For services to the State.
- Sonia Ann Faulkner – of Auckland. For services to Girl Guiding.
- Colin Archibald MacDonald – of Wellington. For services to the State.
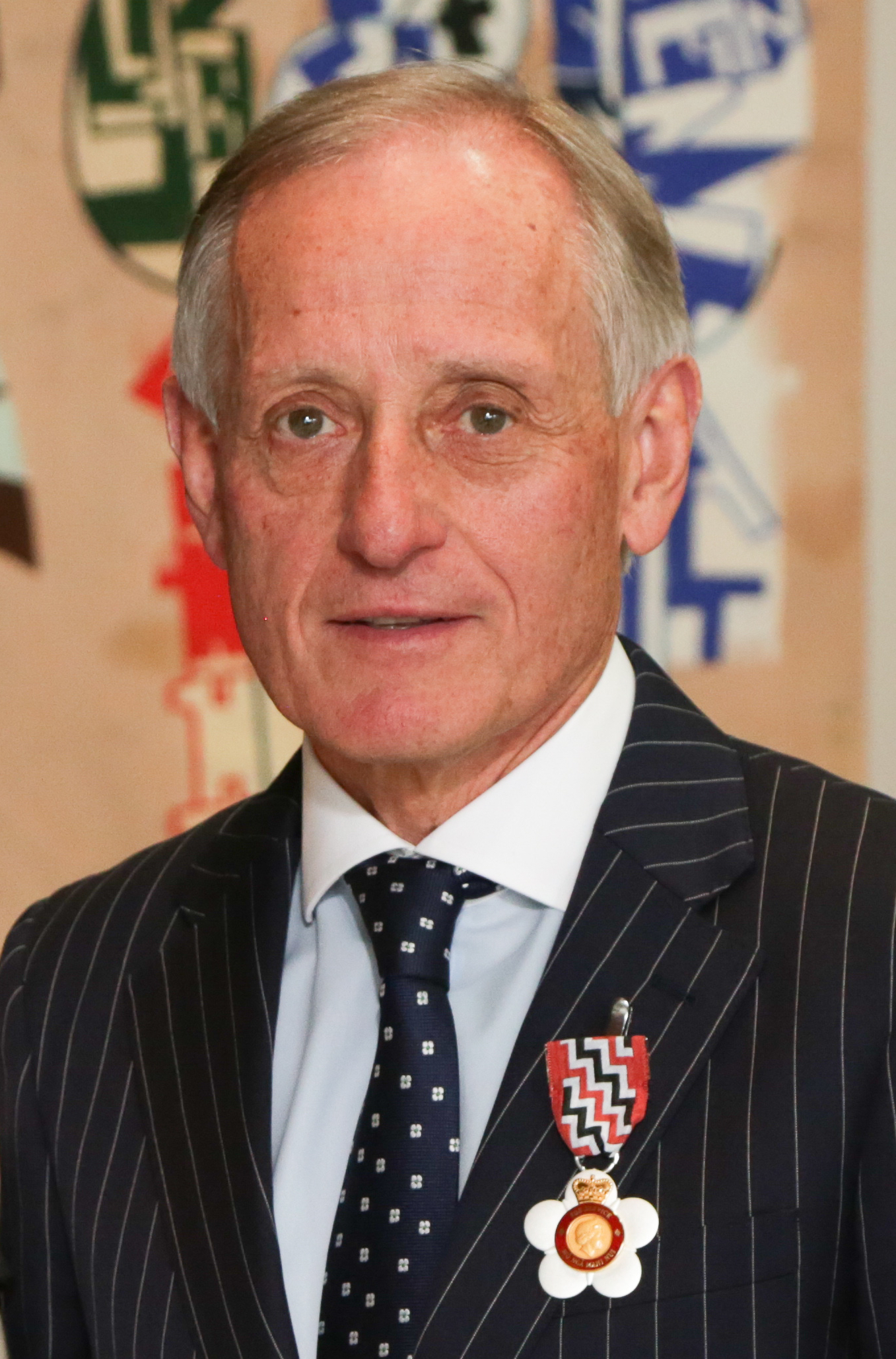
Martyn Dunne

== Queen's Service Medal (QSM) ==
- Virinder Kumar Aggarwal JP – of Auckland. For services to Asian communities.
- Frank Paul Bax – of Paeroa. For services to lawn bowls and the community.
- Bhikhu Bhana – of Auckland. For services to the Indian community and sport.
- Winifred Norah Bickerstaff – of Napier. For services to music education.
- Barbara Joan Brinsley – of Dunedin. For services to art curation.
- Warwick Peter Brooks – of Tairua. For services to Fire and Emergency New Zealand and the community.
- Reverend George William Bryant JP – of Tauranga. For services to publishing and the community.
- Mark Niven Buckley – of Christchurch. For services to Fire and Emergency New Zealand and the community.
- Andrew Buglass – of Hokitika. For services to outdoor recreation and conservation.
- Gerard Bullimore – of Kumara. For services to the community and sport.
- Margaret Hamilton Campion – of Whanganui. For services to the community.
- Garrick Alan Child – of Auckland. For services to hockey.
- John Leonard Clark – of Auckland. For services to the community.
- Geoffrey Robert Crutchley – of Ranfurly. For services to water management.
- Elizabeth Jean Curtis – of Havelock North. For services to music.
- Elizabeth McInnes Dickens – of Auckland. For services to Girls' Brigade.
- William Peter Dixon – of Paraparaumu. For services to the Coastguard.
- Pete Donaldson – of Katikati. For services to the Coastguard.
- Rodney Kelvin Eatwell – of Picton. For services to the community and outdoor recreation. (Note: Deceased. Her Majesty's approval of this appointment took effect on 27 November 2018, prior to the date of decease.)
- John Gordon Elliott – of Auckland. For services to the community.
- Kenneth Donald Fairbrother – of Kaiapoi. For services to seniors and the disabled.
- Paul Ernest Gay – of Invercargill. For services to outdoor education.
- Marilyn Anne Glover – of Auckland. For services to the community and education.
- Jacqueline Goodison (Jackie Clark) – of Auckland. For services to women.
- Colleen Janet Grayling – of Auckland. For services to wildlife conservation.
- Elizabeth Ann Haylock – of Akaroa. For services to the Returned and Services' Association and the community.
- Graeme Leslie Hoole – of Putāruru. For services to Fire and Emergency New Zealand and the community.
- Douglas George Hutchinson – of Hāwera. For services to conservation and the community.
- Lindsay Howard Kerr – of Rangiora. For services to sport.
- Donald Henry John Kirdy – of Ashburton. For services to cycling.
- Sheryl Anne Law – of Auckland. For services to hockey.
- Gwendoline Eileen Lawson – of Whangārei. For services to sports administration.
- Salamina Kaliatama Leolahi – of Auckland. For services to the Niuean community.
- Neill Livingstone – of New Plymouth. For services to taekwondo.
- Pauli Hifo Ma'afu – of Gisborne. For services to the Pacific community.
- William John McLachlan – of Invercargill. For services to Fire and Emergency New Zealand and the community.
- Heather Yvonne McLean – of Tauranga. For services to genealogy and historical research.
- Michael Joseph Merrick – of Waitara. For services to the community.
- Richard Morton Mitchell – of Whanganui. For services to the community and music.
- Heather Juliet Moore – of Hamilton. For services to the community.
- Janice Robyn Kathleen O'Connor – of Auckland. For services to local government and the community.
- Garry William O'Neill – of Palmerston North. For services to historical research.
- Kevin George O'Sullivan – of Auckland. For services to the Coastguard.
- Brian Hart Parker – of Christchurch. For services to the community.
- Janet Evelyn Pentecost – of Rangiora. For services to the community, particularly seniors.
- John William Pullar – of Whakatāne. For services to the community.
- Ross Richards – of Auckland. For services to the community.
- Patricia Anne Roser – of Tauranga. For services to the Coastguard and children.
- Ngaire Ethel Rowe – of Palmerston North. For services to the community.
- Ronald William Rowe – of Palmerston North. For services to the community.
- Florence Melva Shearman – of Cambridge. For services to seniors.
- James Frederick Simpson – of Gisborne. For services to Fire and Emergency New Zealand and the community.
- Graeme John Smith – of Tapanui. For services to the community and theatre.
- Tracey Lyn Swanberg – of Auckland. For services to victims of domestic violence.
- Derek Teariki – of Hastings. For services to the Cook Islands community.
- Alison Muriel Thomson JP – of Hastings. For services to the community.
- Reverend Tauinaola Tofilau – of Auckland. For services to the Pacific community.
- Reverend Penesikoto Togiatama – of Auckland. For services to the Niuean community.
- Alison Grace Vautier JP – of Waikanae. For services to the community.
- Elsie Valentine Walkinshaw – of Christchurch. For services to the community.
- Walter James Walsh – of Gisborne. For services to the community and broadcasting.
- Anthony Graham Warren – of Kaikohe. For services to youth.
- Eileen Isobel Whaitiri JP – of the Chatham Islands. For services to Māori and the community.
- Derek Meredith Williams – of Auckland. For services to the Welsh community and athletics.
- Dr Allan Young – of Palmerston North. For services to ethnic communities and dentistry.
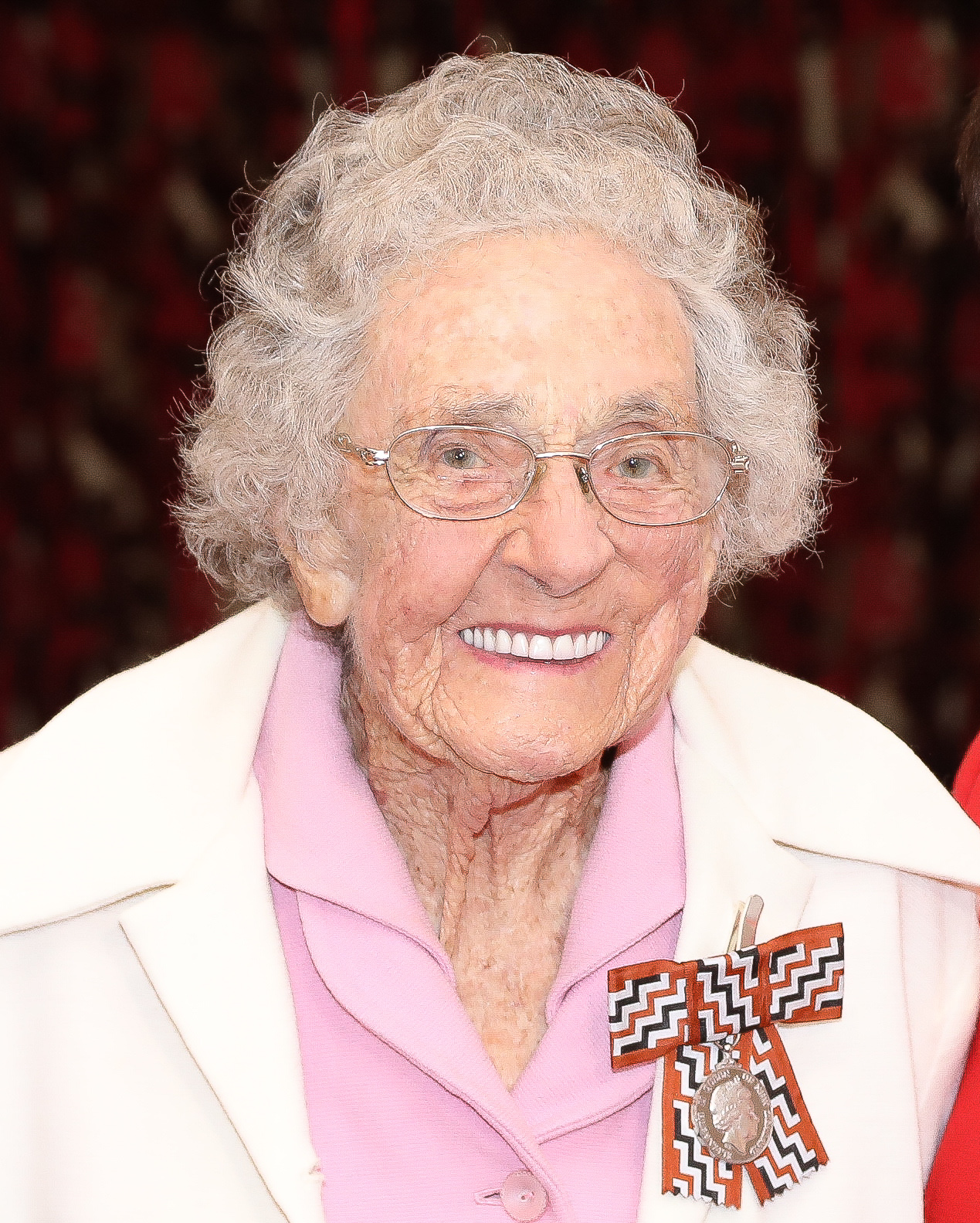
Winifred Bickerstaff

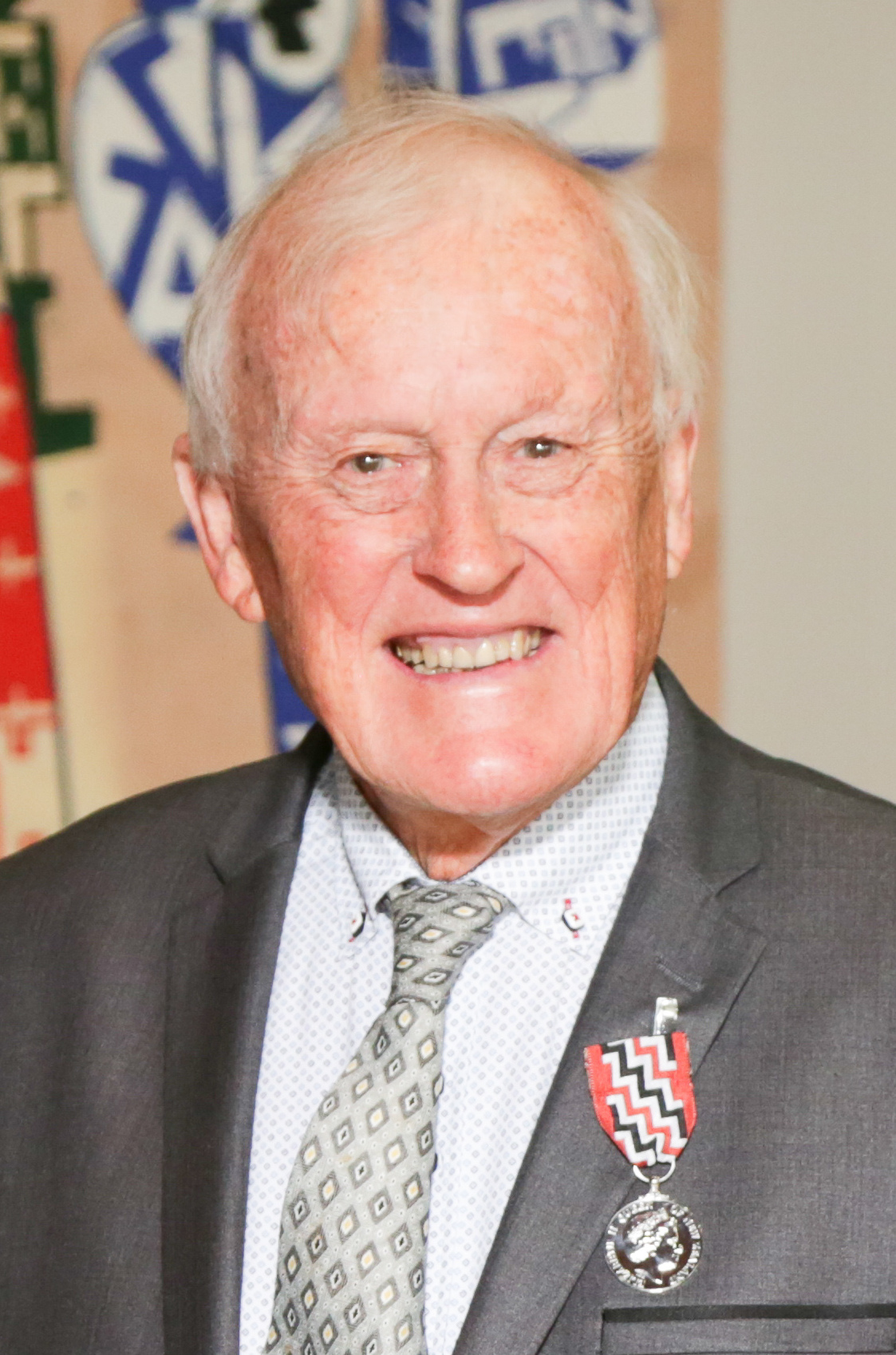
George Bryant

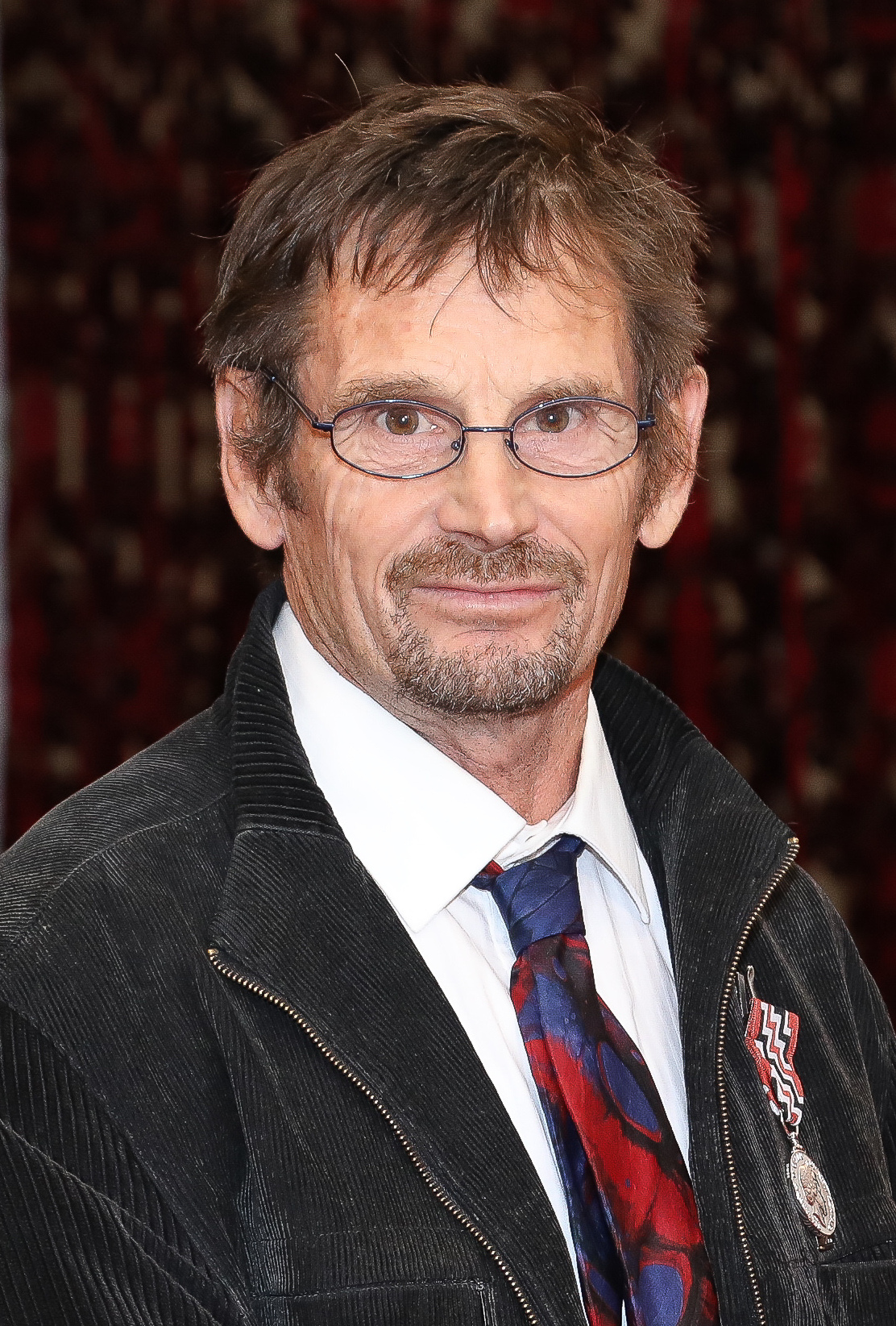
Andrew Buglass

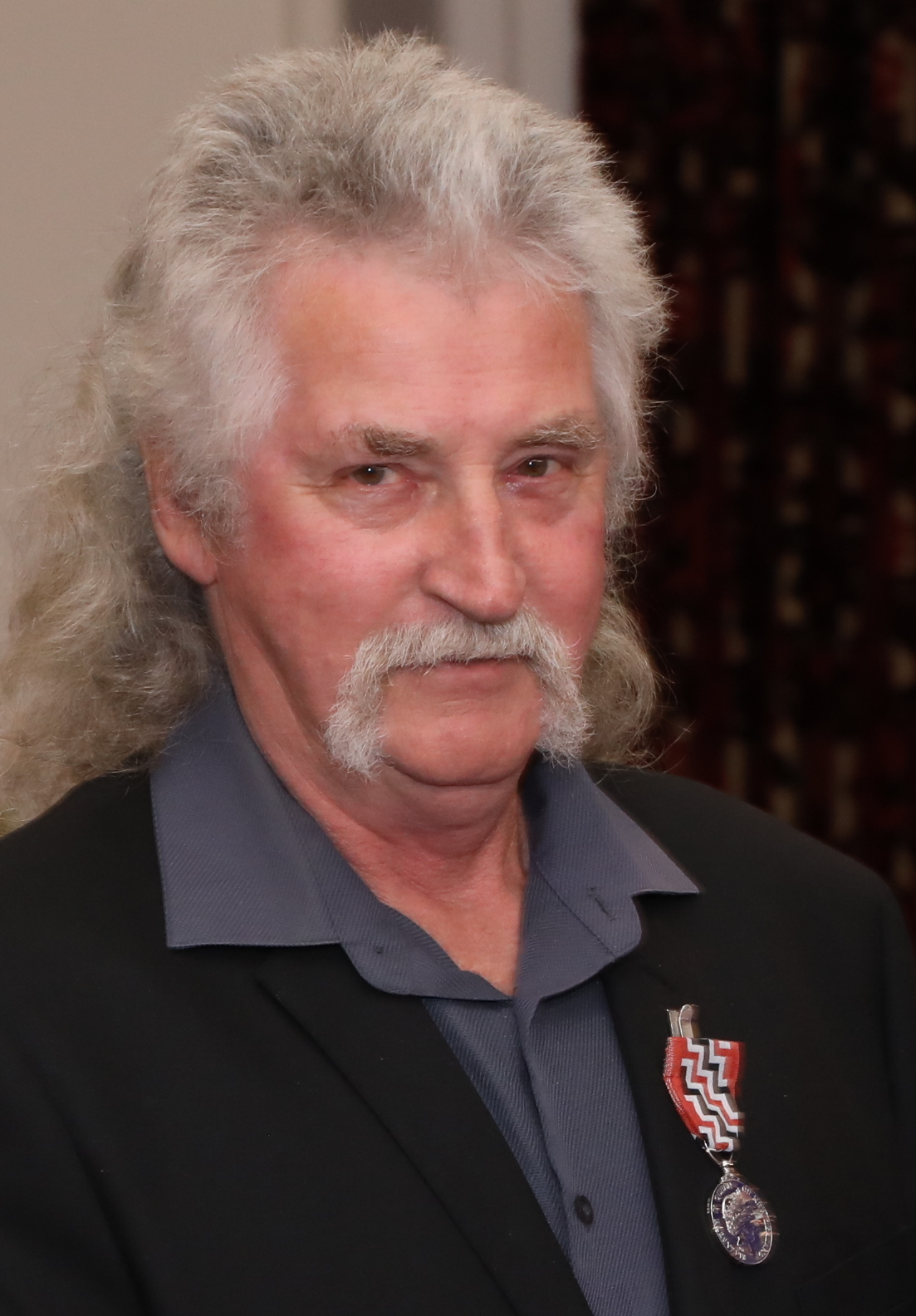
Gerard Bullimore

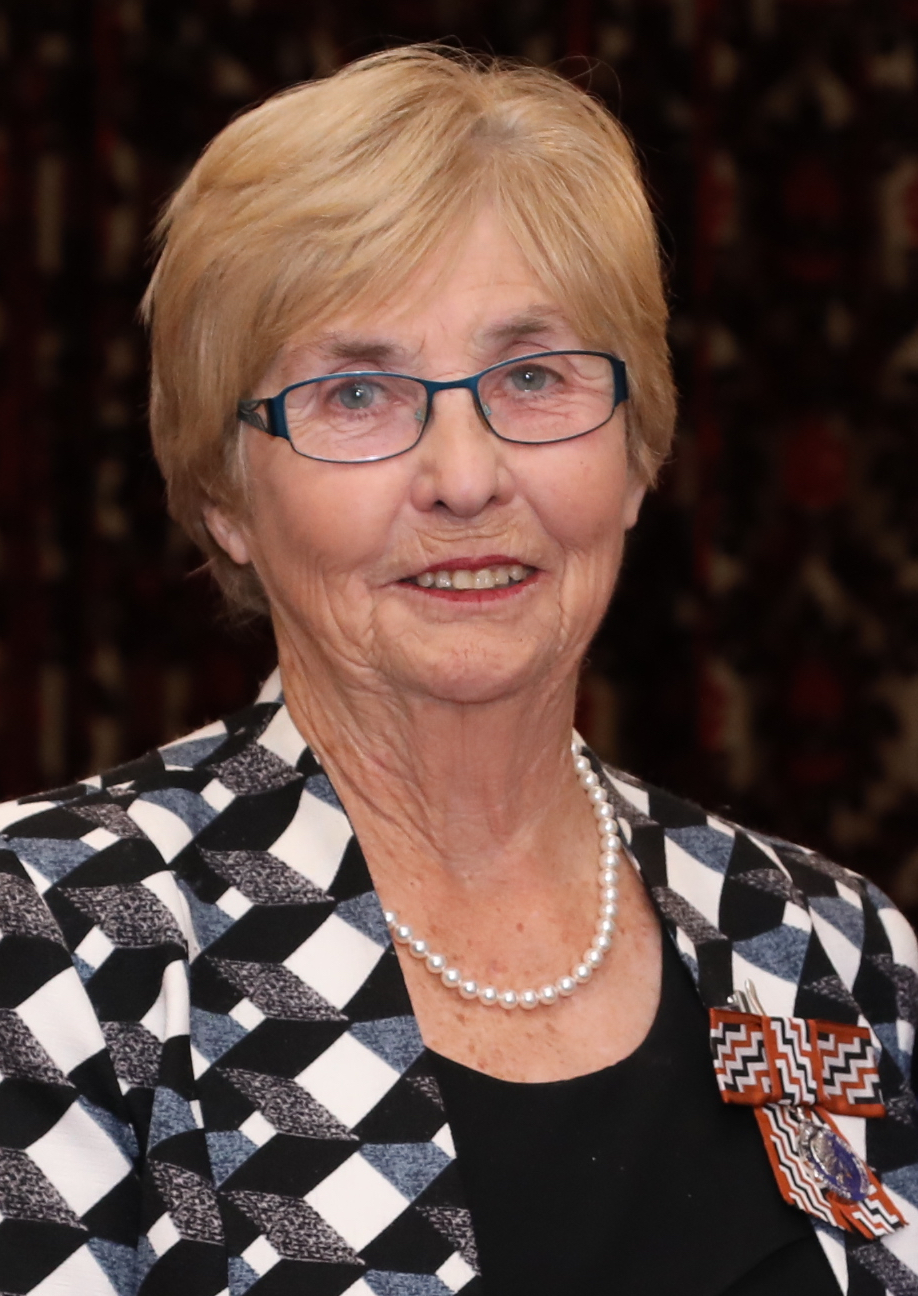
Margaret Campion

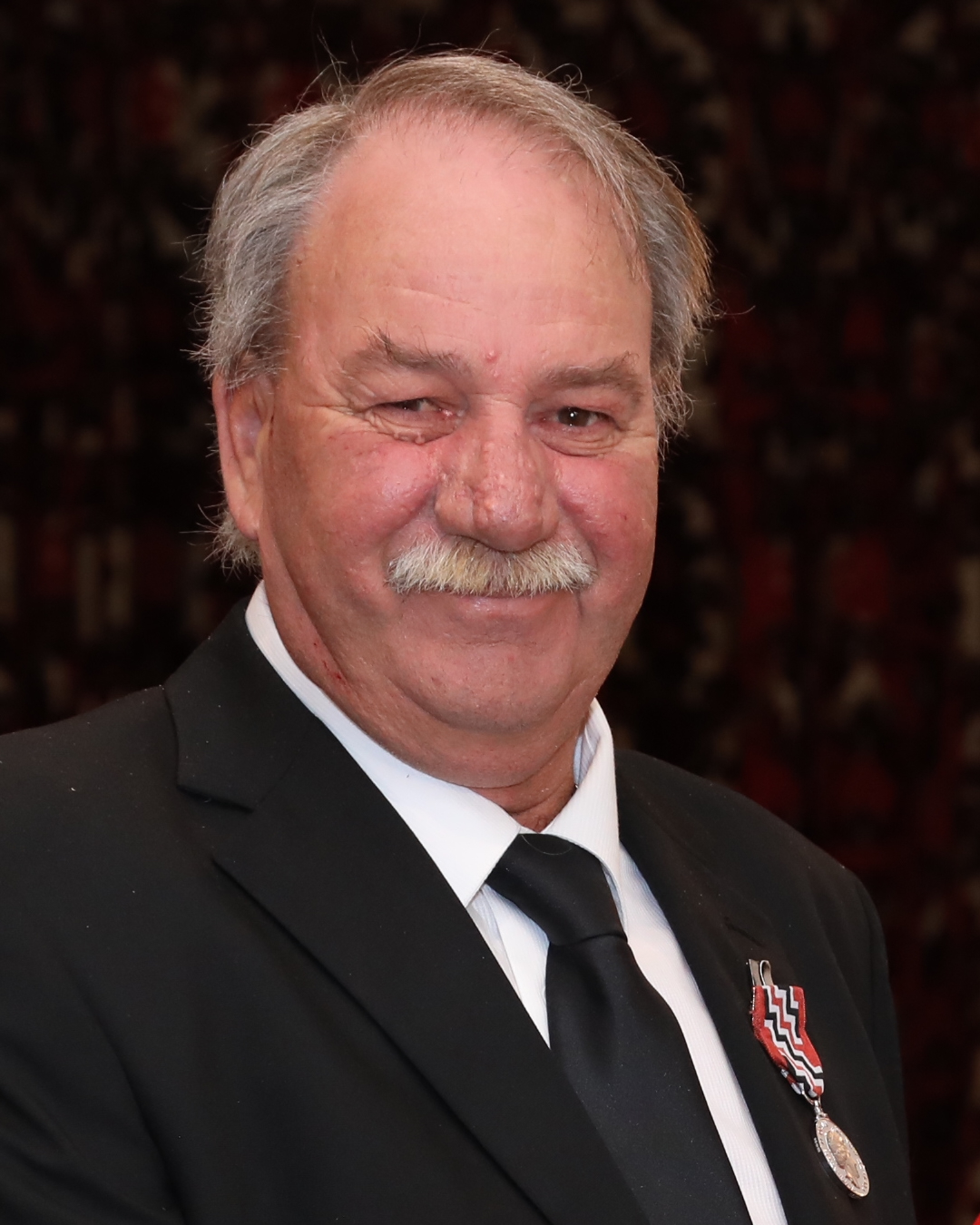
Pete Dixon

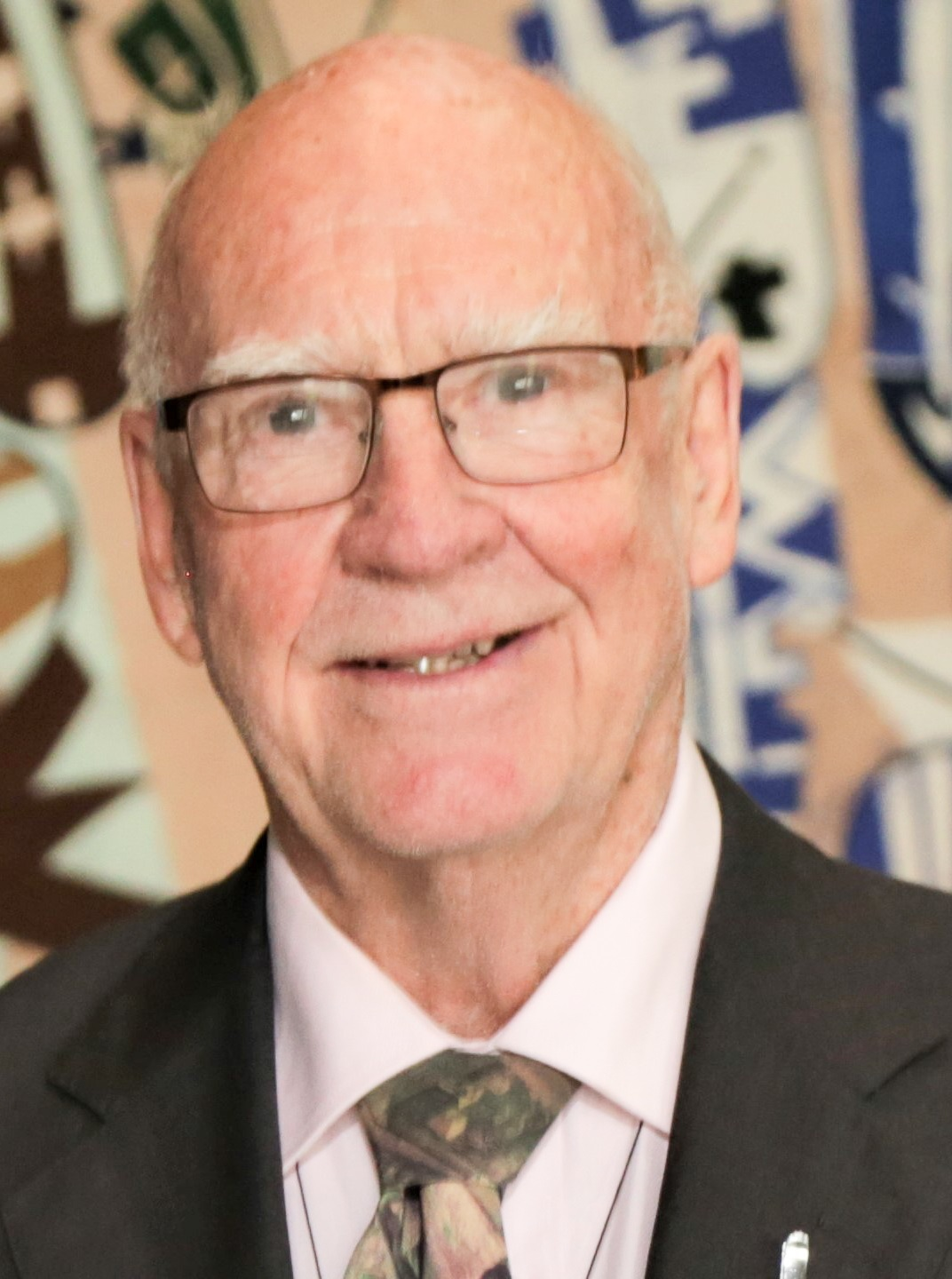
John Elliott

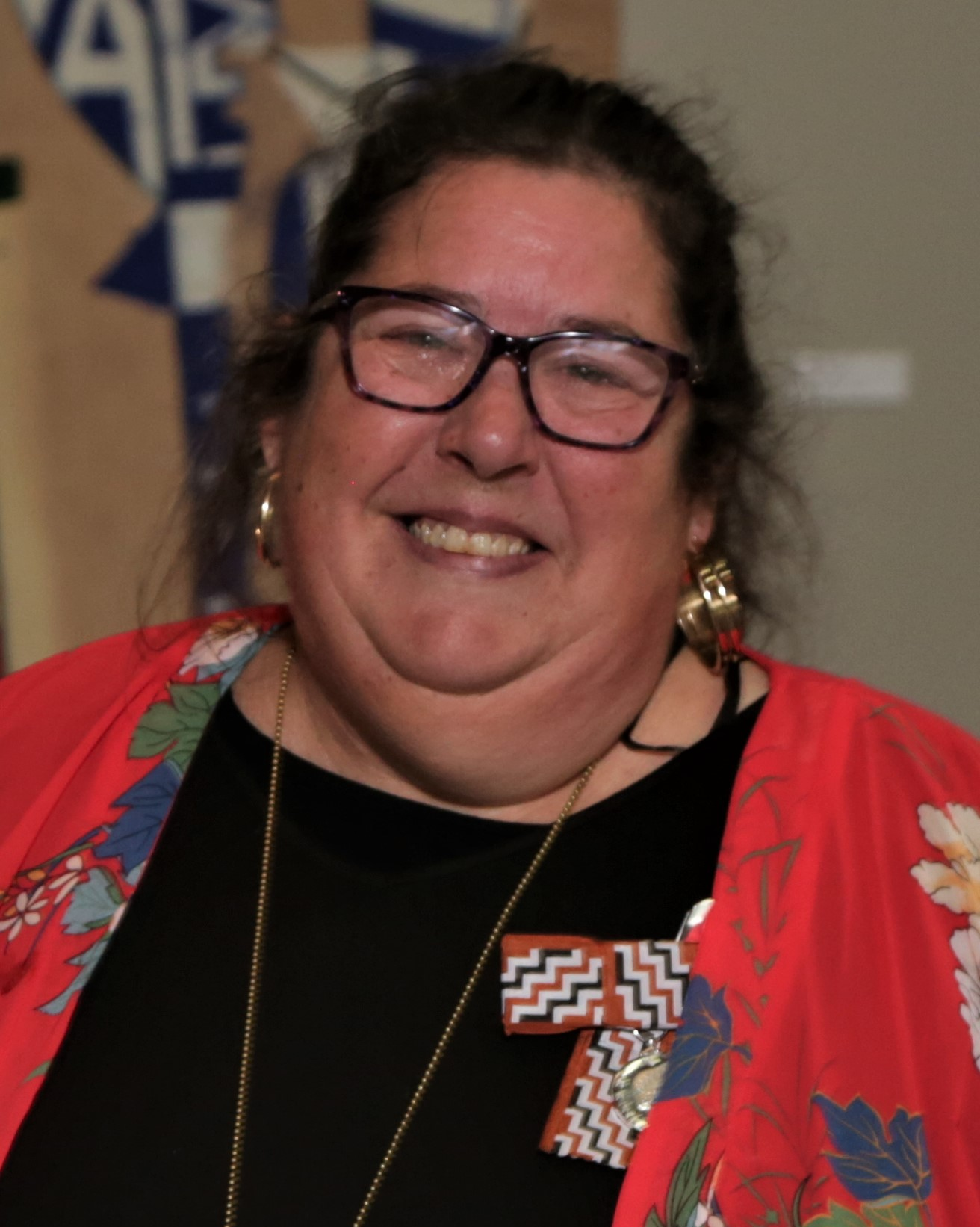
Jackie Clark

Paul Gay

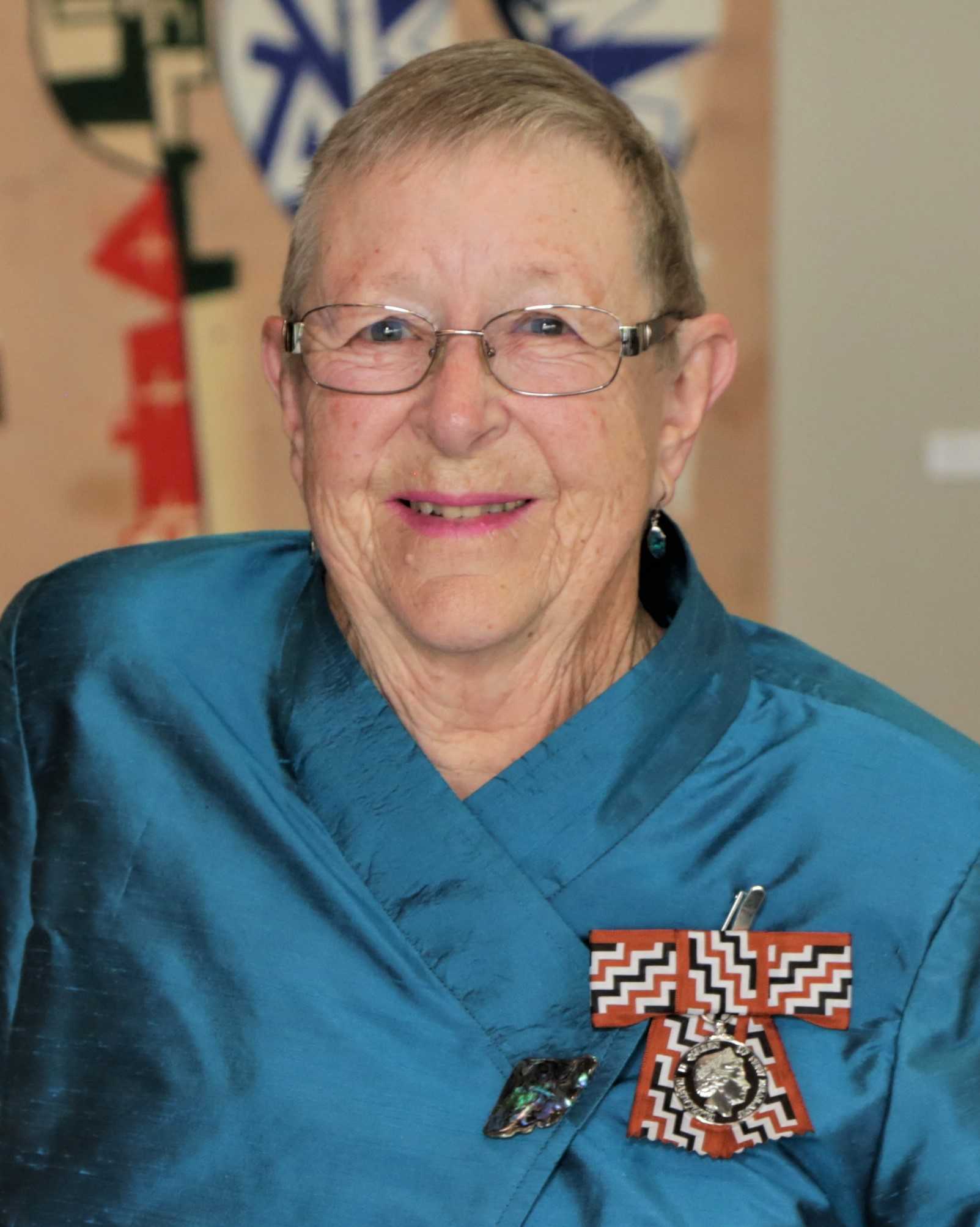
Marilyn Glover

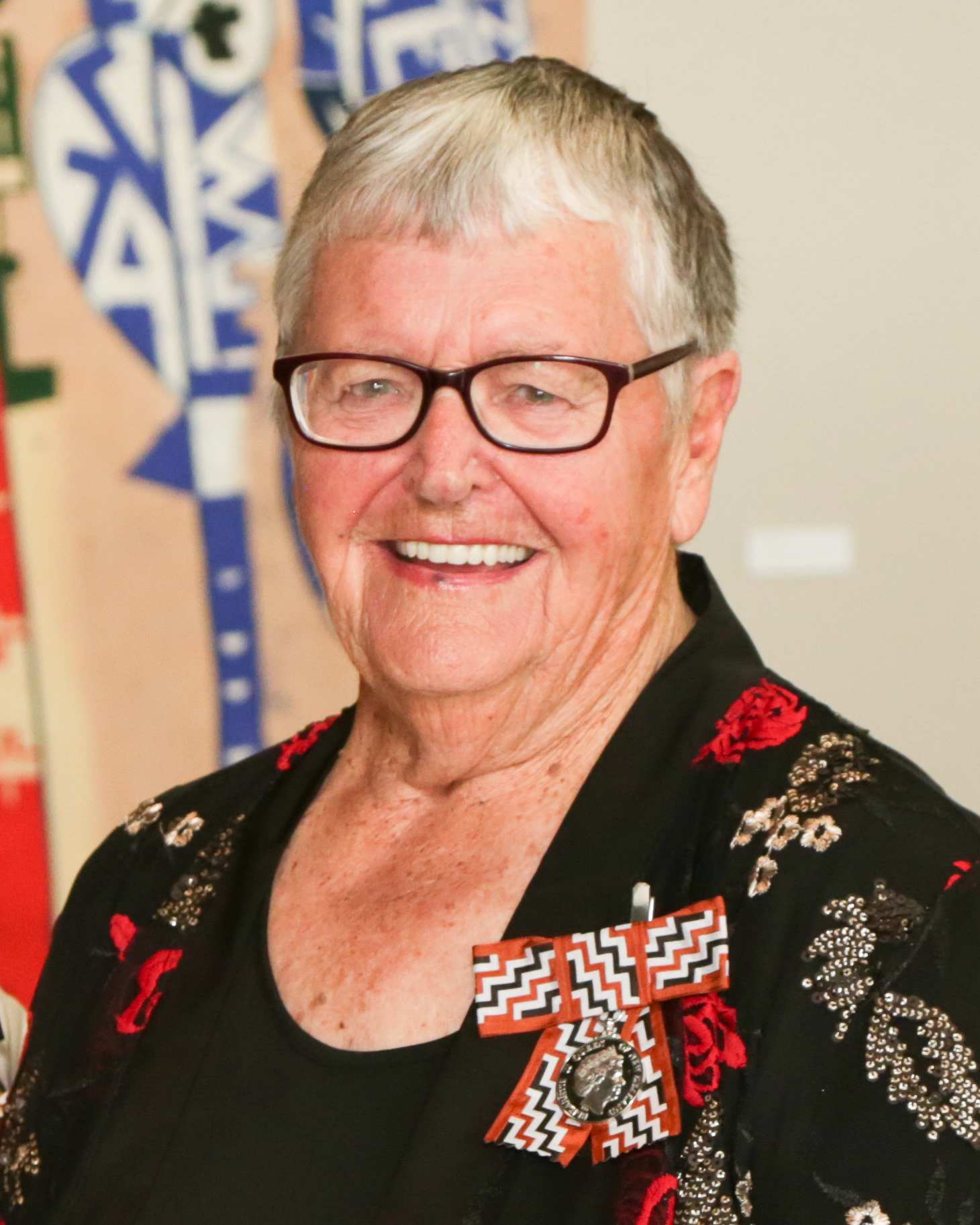
Gwen Lawson

Kevin O'Sullivan

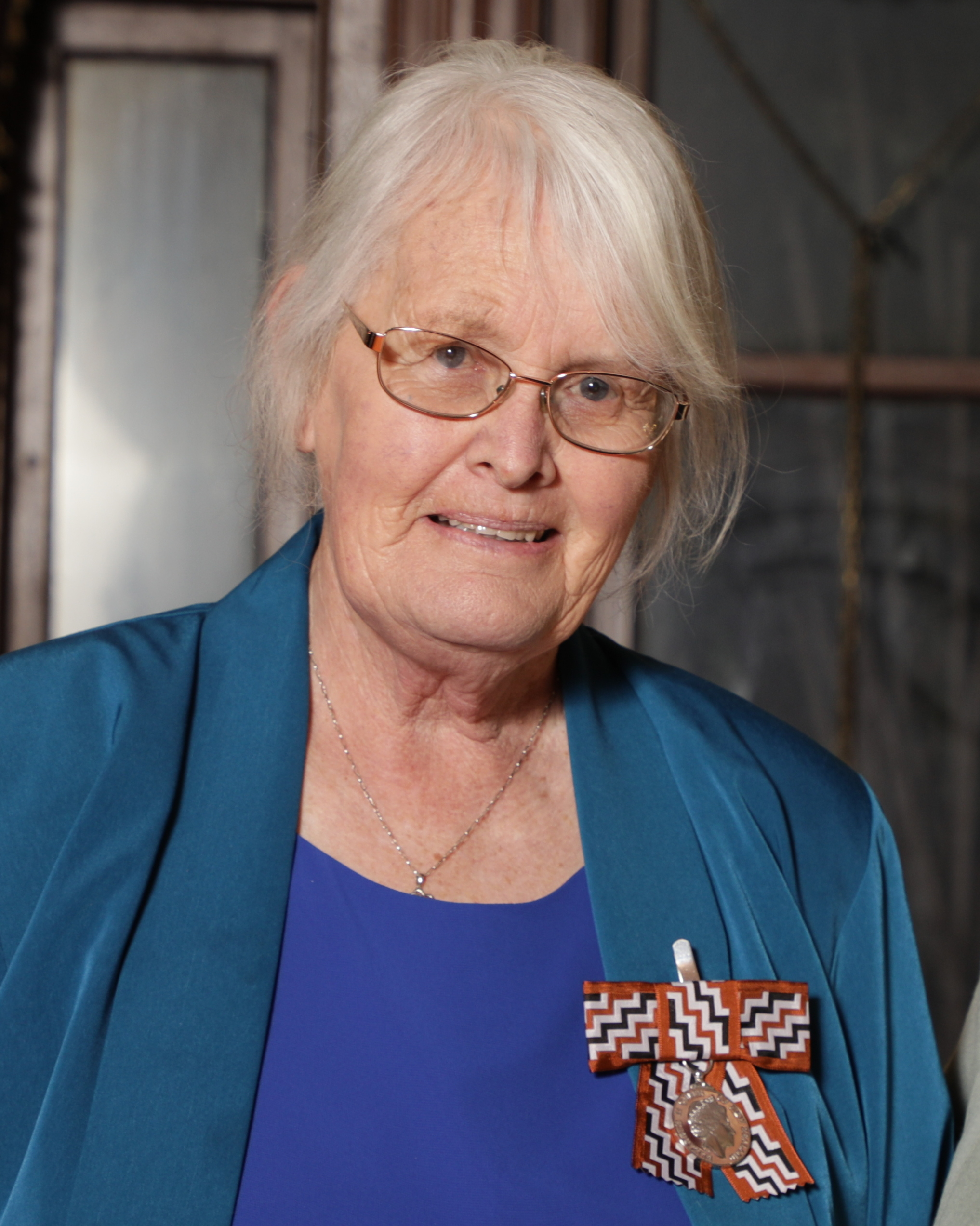
Jan Pentecost

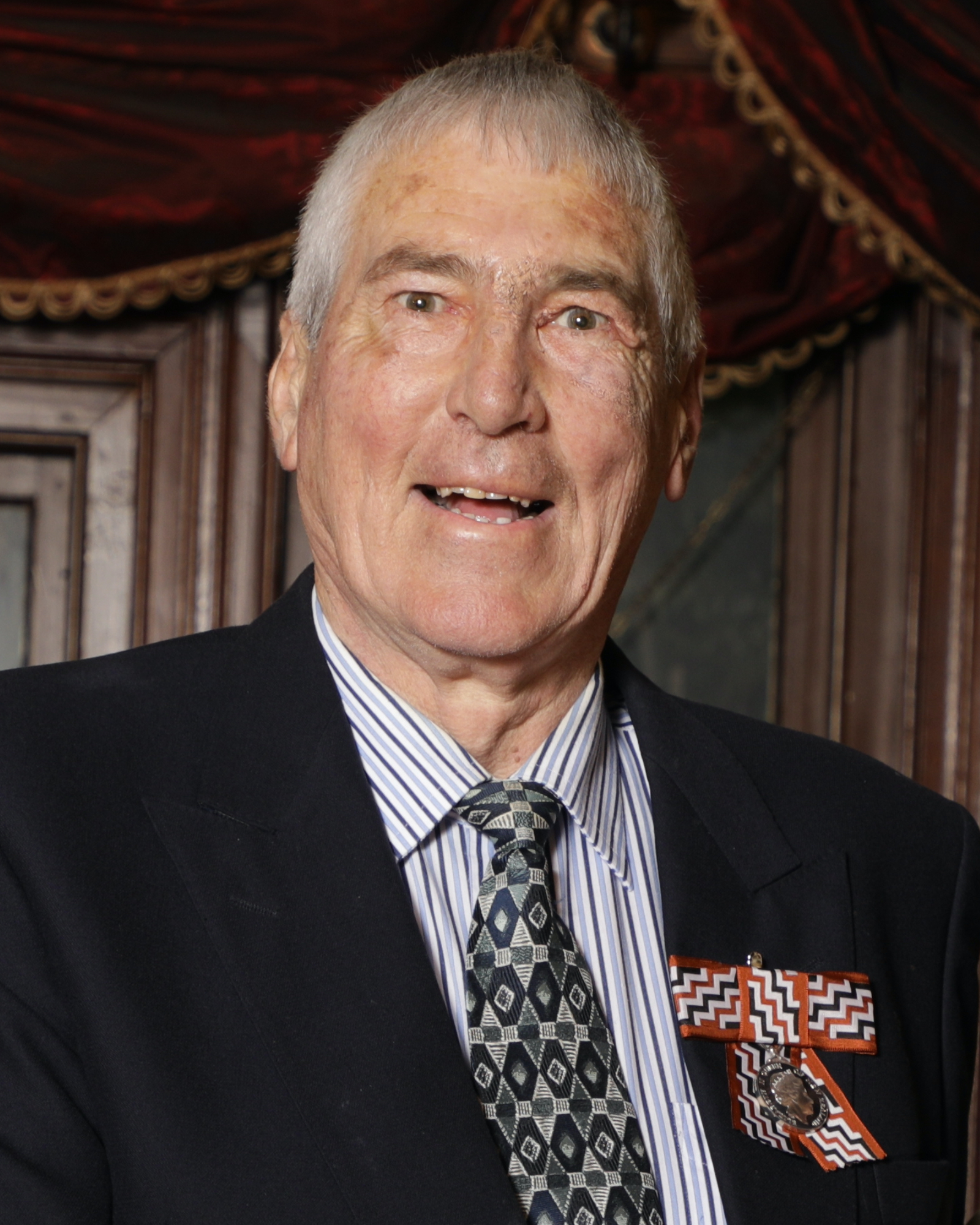
Graeme Smith

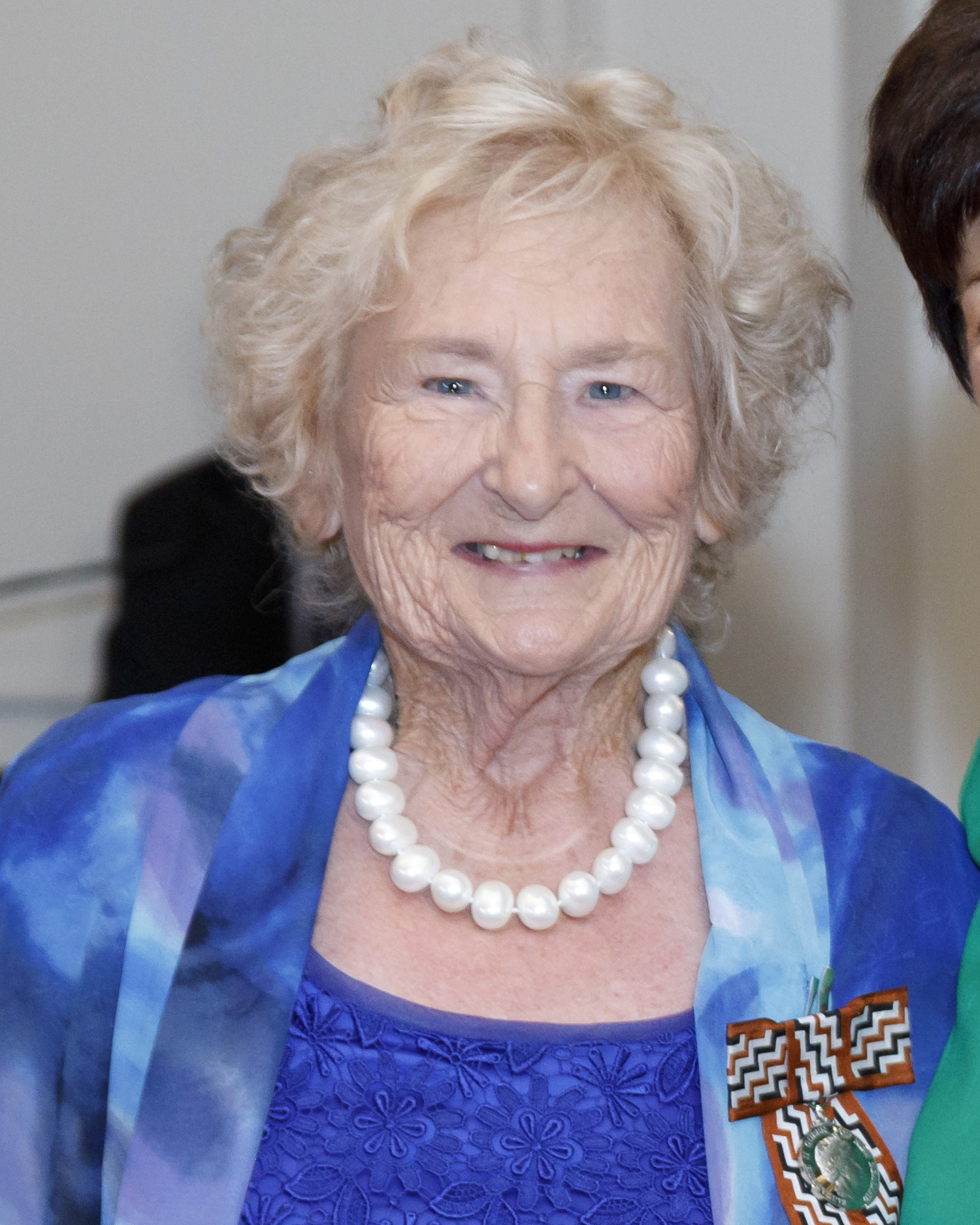
Alison Vautier

== New Zealand Antarctic Medal (NZAM) ==
- Professor Patricia Jean Langhorne – of Dunedin. For services to Antarctic science.
- Andrew Leachman – of Nelson. For services to New Zealand's Antarctic maritime capabilities and scientific research. (Note: Posthumous award)
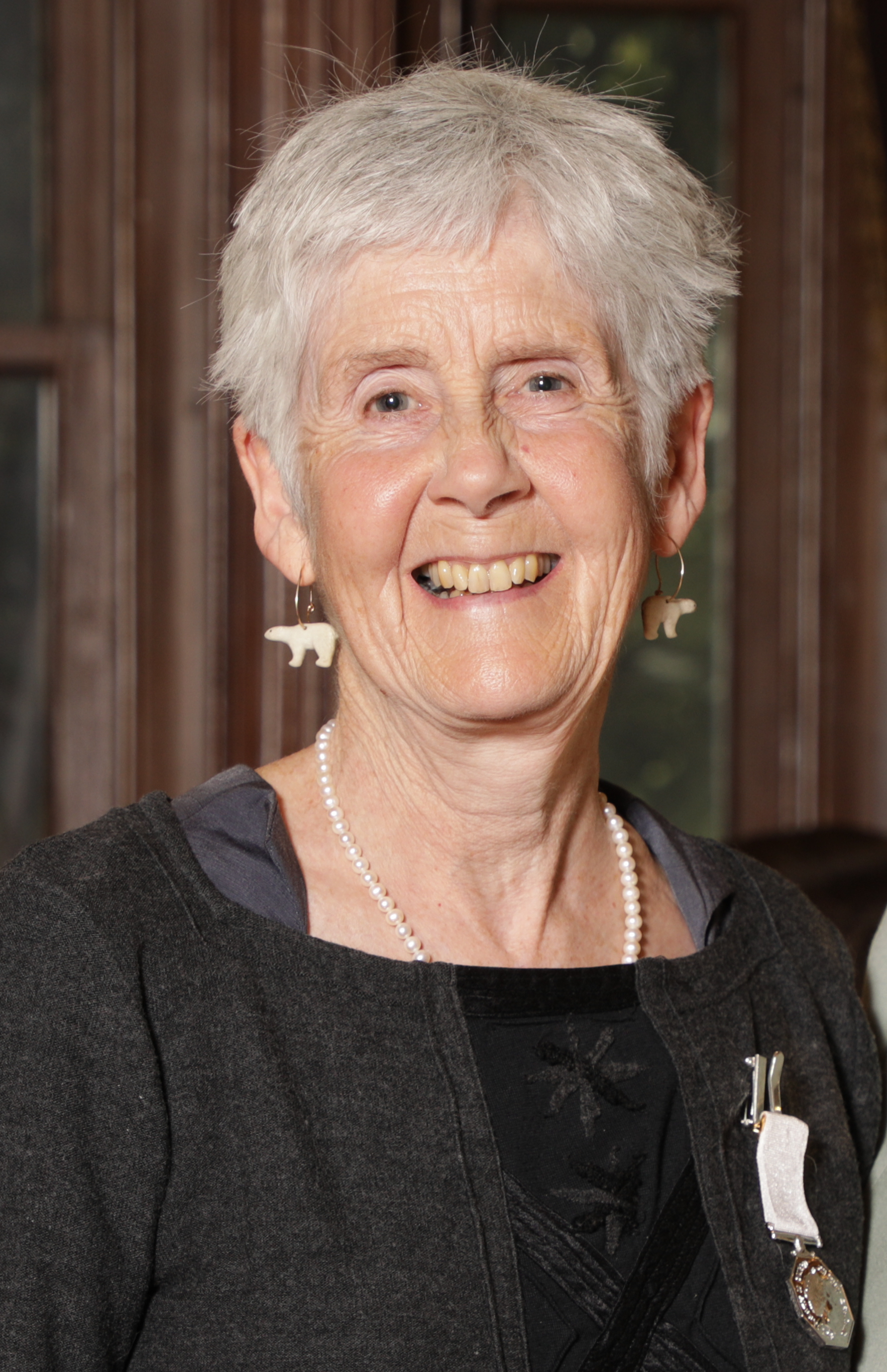
Pat Langhorne

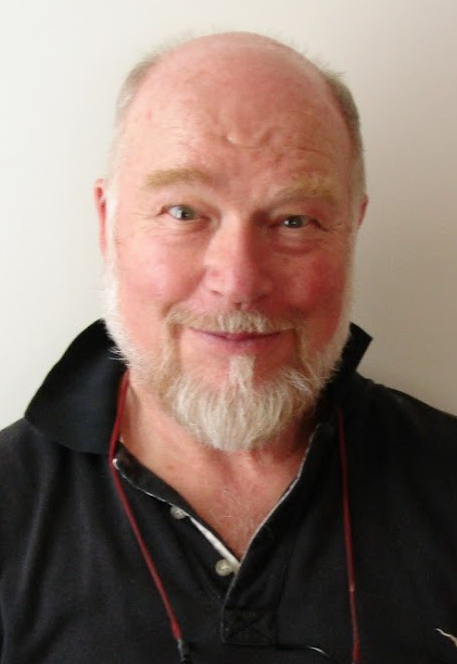
Andrew Leachman

== New Zealand Distinguished Service Decoration (DSD) ==
- Serviceman S. For services to the New Zealand Defence Force.
- Lieutenant Commander Jan Joseph Tupuola Peterson – of Auckland. For services to the New Zealand Defence Force.
- Colonel Ruth Leonie Putze – of Upper Hutt. For services to the New Zealand Defence Force.
