= List of grand and principal companions of the New Zealand Order of Merit =

This is a complete list of those who were made knights or dames grand companion of the New Zealand Order of Merit from the date of the order's establishment in 1996 by Queen Elizabeth II, on 30 May 1996. Knights and dames grand cross use the post-nominal GNZM. From 2000 to 2009, the highest level of the order were principal companions (PCNZM) without the appellation of "sir" or "dame".

Dame Silvia Cartwright who was a Dame in 1989 and Sir Ivor Richardson who was knighted in 1986 chose not to convert their respective PCNZM to GNZM.

== Knights and dames grand companion ==
Image	Name	Date	Notes
	The Rt. Hon. Sir Bill Birch, GNZM PC (1934–2026)	7 June 1999	Minister of Finance
	The Rt. Hon. Dame Sian Elias, GNZM PC (1949–)	7 June 1999	Chief Justice
	Sir Lloyd Geering, ONZ GNZM CBE (1918–)	27 March 2009	
	Sir Pat Goodman, GNZM CBE (1929–2017)	27 March 2009	
	Sir Paul Callaghan, GNZM (1947–2012)	27 March 2009	
	Dame Malvina Major, ONZ GNZM DBE; 1943–	27 March 2009	
	Sir Ngātata Love, GNZM QSO (1937–2018)	27 March 2009	
	Sir Ray Avery, GNZM (1947–)	31 December 2010	
	Sir Murray Brennan, GNZM (1940–)	31 December 2014	
	The Rt. Hon. Sir John Key, GNZM AC (1961–)	5 June 2017	Prime Minister
	Sir Stephen Tindall, GNZM (1951–)	31 December 2018	
	The Rt. Hon. Dame Jacinda Ardern, GNZM (1980–)	5 June 2023	Prime Minister

== Principal companions ==
Image	Name	Date	Notes
	The Rt Revd Whakahuihui Vercoe, PCNZM MBE (1928–2007)	5 June 2000	
	The Rt Hon Sir Ivor Richardson, PCNZM PC (1930–2014)	3 May 2002	President of the Court of Appeal

== Additional members ==
Image	Name	Date	Notes
	The Rt. Hon. Sir Michael Hardie Boys, GNZM GCMG QSO KStJ PC (1931–2023)	26 September 1996	Governor-General
	The Hon. Dame Silvia Cartwright, ONZ PCNZM DBE QSO KStJ (1943–)	20 March 2001	Governor-General
	The Rt. Hon. Sir Anand Satyanand, GNZM QSO KStJ (1944–)	5 June 2006	Governor-General
	Lieutenant-General The Rt. Hon. Sir Jerry Mateparae, GNZM QSO KStJ (1954–)	20 May 2011	Governor-General
	The Rt. Hon. Dame Patsy Reddy, GNZM CVO QSO DStJ (1954–)	27 June 2016	Governor-General
	The Rt. Hon. Dame Helen Winkelmann, GNZM (1962–)	4 March 2019	Chief Justice
	The Rt. Hon. Dame Cindy Kiro, GNZM QSO DStJ (1958–)	9 August 2021	Governor-General
