= John Angus (children's advocate) =

New Zealand children's advocate (1948–2015)

John Angus MNZM
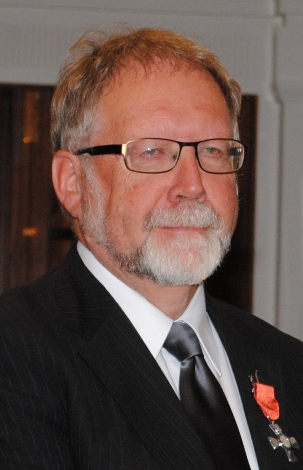
- Angus in 2012
- Born: John Hall Angus; 1948
- Died: 10 January 2015 (aged 66); Clyde, New Zealand
- Education: University of Otago
- Scientific career
- Thesis: City and country: change and continuity; electoral politics and society in Otago 1877–1893. (1976)

John Hall Angus MNZM (1948 – 10 January 2015) was a New Zealand historian, social worker and children's advocate. He served as the New Zealand Children's Commissioner between 2009 and 2011.

== Biography ==
Educated at Palmerston District High School and Bayfield High School, Angus completed a PhD in history at the University of Otago in 1976. His research examined politics and society in late-19th century Otago. In 1977 he became a social worker with the Department of Social Welfare in Dunedin, until moving into an advisory role in the department in Wellington 10 years later. Between 2001 and 2006 he was the principal advisor in the Ministry of Social Development. He participated in the review of the Children, Young Persons, and Their Families Act 1989, led work on the prevention of child abuse for the Taskforce on Action on Violence within Families, and, in 2003 to 2004, served on the ministerial task force on the community and voluntary sector.

In 2009, he succeeded Cindy Kiro as the Children's Commissioner, a role in which he served until June 2011. In 2009 he voiced his support for the Crimes (Substituted Section 59) Amendment Act 2007 (the so-called "anti-smacking" law) in advance of the citizens-initiated referendum later that year, aimed at repealing the act. In the 2012 New Year Honours, Angus was appointed a Member of the New Zealand Order of Merit for services to the State.

Angus died in Clyde in 2015. The Minister of Social Development, Anne Tolley, said that Angus had been a "tireless advocate for the rights of children."
