= Christiane Weidner =

Austrian stage actor (1730–1799)

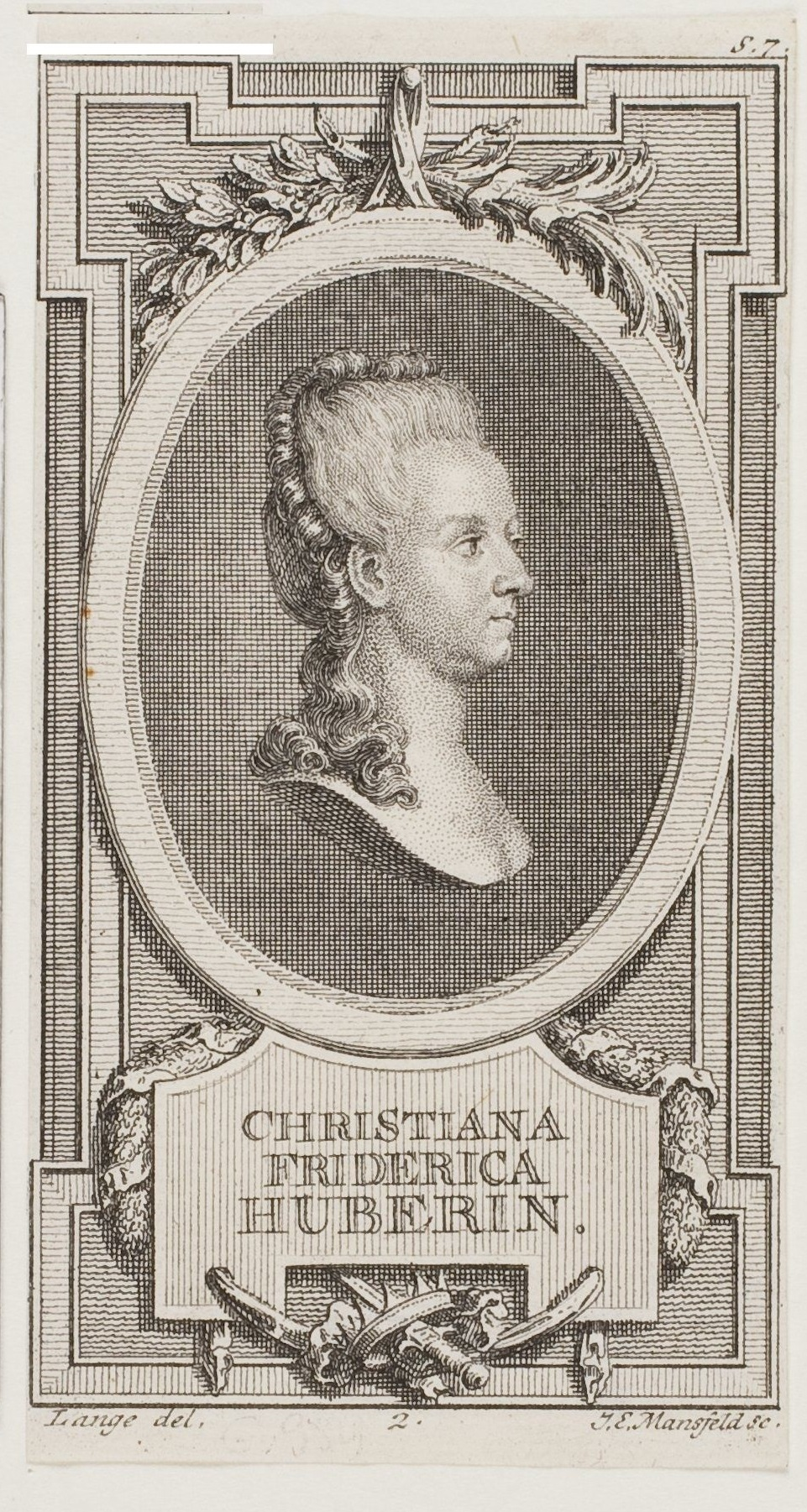
Christiana Friderica Huberin 1772

Christiana "Christiane" Friderica Weidner later Huberin (1730–1799) was a stage actress from the Holy Roman Empire. She was engaged at the Burgtheater in 1748–1799. She belonged to the pioneer generation actors of the Burgtheater and was referred to as their Doyenne. She was foremost known for her roles within tragedies. She married the actor Joseph Karl Huber (1726–1760).
