= David Gascoigne =

New Zealand lawyer and statesman (1940–2026)

Sir David Gascoigne KNZM CBE QSO CStJ
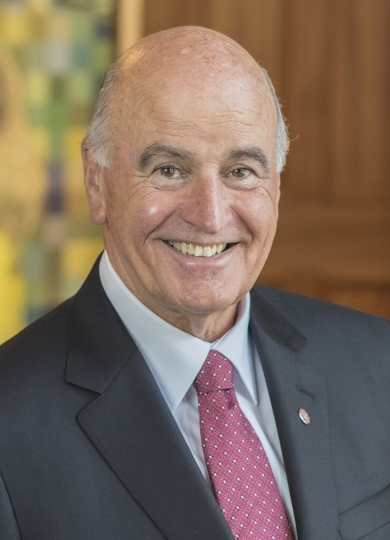

Viceregal consort of New Zealand
- In office 28 September 2016 – 28 September 2021
- Preceded by: Janine Mateparae
- Succeeded by: Richard Davies

Personal details
- Born: David Rendel Kingston Gascoigne; 15 January 1940 Wairau, New Zealand
- Died: 26 October 2026 (aged 86)
- Spouse(s): Margaret Louise Campbell Patsy Reddy (m. 2016)
- Education: Victoria University of Wellington

Sir David Rendel Kingston Gascoigne KNZM CBE QSO CStJ (15 January 1940 – 26 October 2026) was a New Zealand lawyer and judicial conduct commissioner. He was the husband of Dame Patsy Reddy, who served as the 21st governor-general of New Zealand from 2016 to 2021.

== Early life and education ==
Gascoigne was born on 15 January 1940 in the Wairau Valley of New Zealand's South Island, the son of Keith and Dorothy Gascoigne. The family moved to Blenheim where he received most of his schooling, including at Marlborough College where he was dux.

He completed tertiary study at Victoria University of Wellington, graduating with a Master of Laws degree in 1964.

== Career ==
Gascoigne began his legal career with Watts and Patterson (now Minter Ellison Rudd Watts), where he became chairman of partners specialising in corporate law. He maintained an association with this firm. Gascoigne's early partners in the practice included his future second wife, Patsy Reddy, and her then husband, Geoff Harley.

He served as chairman of Mitsubishi Motors New Zealand Limited, New Zealand Film Production Fund Trust, and New Zealand Opera Limited. He also served as the chairman of Transpower New Zealand Limited until November 2007 and chairman of The Co-operative Bank Limited until 1 April 2012. He served as a board member of the Museum of New Zealand Te Papa Tongarewa. Gascoigne served as a director of Transpower New Zealand Limited from 27 December 2000 to 31 October 2007. He served as a director at Skycity Leisure Limited and Mitsubishi Motors New Zealand Limited.

From 2005 to 2016, Gascoigne was an independent reviewer of the Auditor General's audit allocation process. From 2009, he served a six-year term as New Zealand's second judicial conduct commissioner.

== Death ==
Gascoigne died on 26 October 2026, at the age of 86.

== Honours and awards ==
In the 1989 New Year Honours, Gascoigne was appointed a Commander of the Order of the British Empire, for services to the film industry.

Gascoigne was appointed a Distinguished Companion of the New Zealand Order of Merit, for services to arts and business, in the 2006 New Year Honours. In the 2009 Special Honours, he accepted re-designation as a Knight Companion of the New Zealand Order of Merit following the restoration of titular honours by the New Zealand government.

In 2016, Gascoigne was appointed a Commander of the Most Venerable Order of the Hospital of Saint John of Jerusalem.

On 28 September 2021, the final day of his wife's term as governor-general, Gascoigne was appointed an additional Companion of the Queen's Service Order.
