= Helen Winkelmann =

Chief Justice of New Zealand since 2019

The Right Honourable Dame Helen Winkelmann GNZM
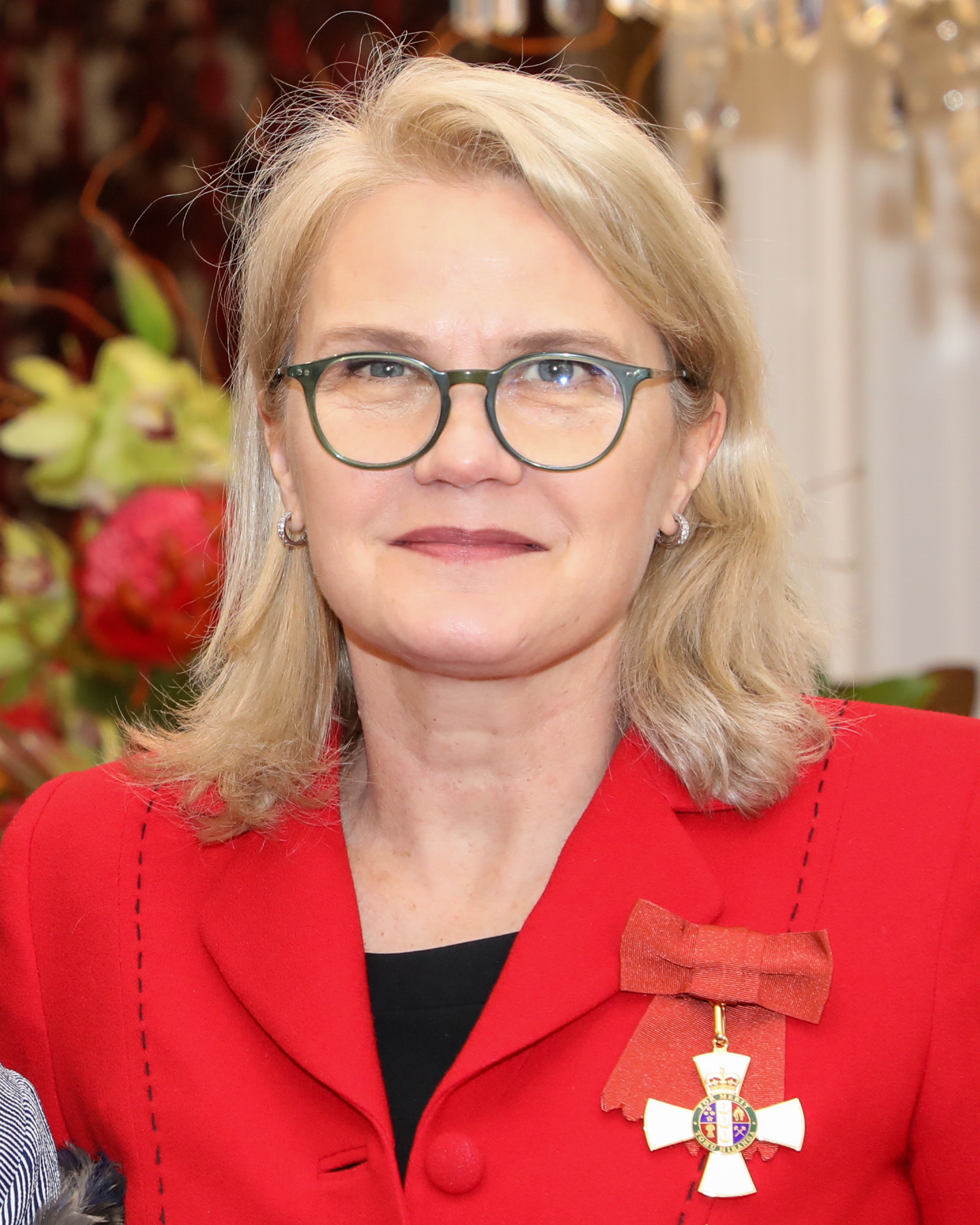
- Winkelmann in 2022

13th Chief Justice of New Zealand
- Incumbent
- Assumed office 14 March 2019
- Nominated by: Jacinda Ardern
- Appointed by: Patsy Reddy
- Preceded by: Sian Elias

Personal details
- Born: 1962 (age 63–64)
- Education: University of Auckland
- Profession: Barrister

Dame Helen Diana Winkelmann GNZM (born 1962) is the 13th and current chief justice of New Zealand – head of the New Zealand judiciary – having been sworn in on 14 March 2019. She is the second woman to hold the position, following her immediate predecessor, Sian Elias.

== Early life and family ==
Winkelmann was born in 1962 to Kathleen Winkelmann (née Papich), of Croatian descent, and her husband Douglas Winkelmann. She was raised in the Auckland suburb of Blockhouse Bay, and educated at Lynfield College. She went on to study history and law at the University of Auckland, with a focus on commercial law, and graduated with a Bachelor of Laws and Bachelor of Arts in history. She was awarded the Auckland District Law Society Centenary Prize for best undergraduate degree, and was admitted to the bar in 1985.

Winkelmann's sister is the New Zealand fashion designer Adrienne Winkelmann.

== Early judicial career ==
Winkelmann began work as a law clerk with Auckland firm Nicholson Gribbin (later Phillips Fox, now DLA Piper). In 1988, at age 25, Winkelmann became the first female partner and one of the youngest partners ever in the firm's then 117-year history. She remained at that firm until May 2001 when she began practice as a barrister sole specialising in insolvency, commercial litigation and medical disciplinary litigation.

Winkelmann was appointed a High Court judge in July 2004 and she was appointed as Chief High Court Judge with effect from 1 February 2010. She remained in that position until her appointment to the Court of Appeal in 2015.

As Chief High Court judge, Winkelmann introduced reforms aimed at improving accessibility to the High Court's processes in its civil jurisdiction, improving the timeliness with which the Court dealt with both civil and criminal matters, and improving public understanding of the work of the Courts. These initiatives included the reintroduction of the publication of annual reports for the High Court, which included the Court reporting against judgment timeliness standards, and the introduction of the Higher Courts (now Senior Courts) Twitter account to improve communications with the public.

She has spoken regularly on issues concerning the just and efficient operation of the Courts, and access to justice. This was the topic of her 2014 Ethel Benjamin address, ‘Access to justice, who needs lawyers?’

In 2011, following the devastating Canterbury earthquakes, Winkelmann worked with Justice Miller to set up the Earthquake List in Christchurch. The objective of that List was to enable proceedings flowing out of the Christchurch earthquake to be dealt with promptly and in a time frame that met the needs of the community. Winkelmann was jointly awarded the Australasian Institute of Judicial Administration Award for Excellence in 2013, for her work in judicial administration flowing out of the Christchurch earthquake.

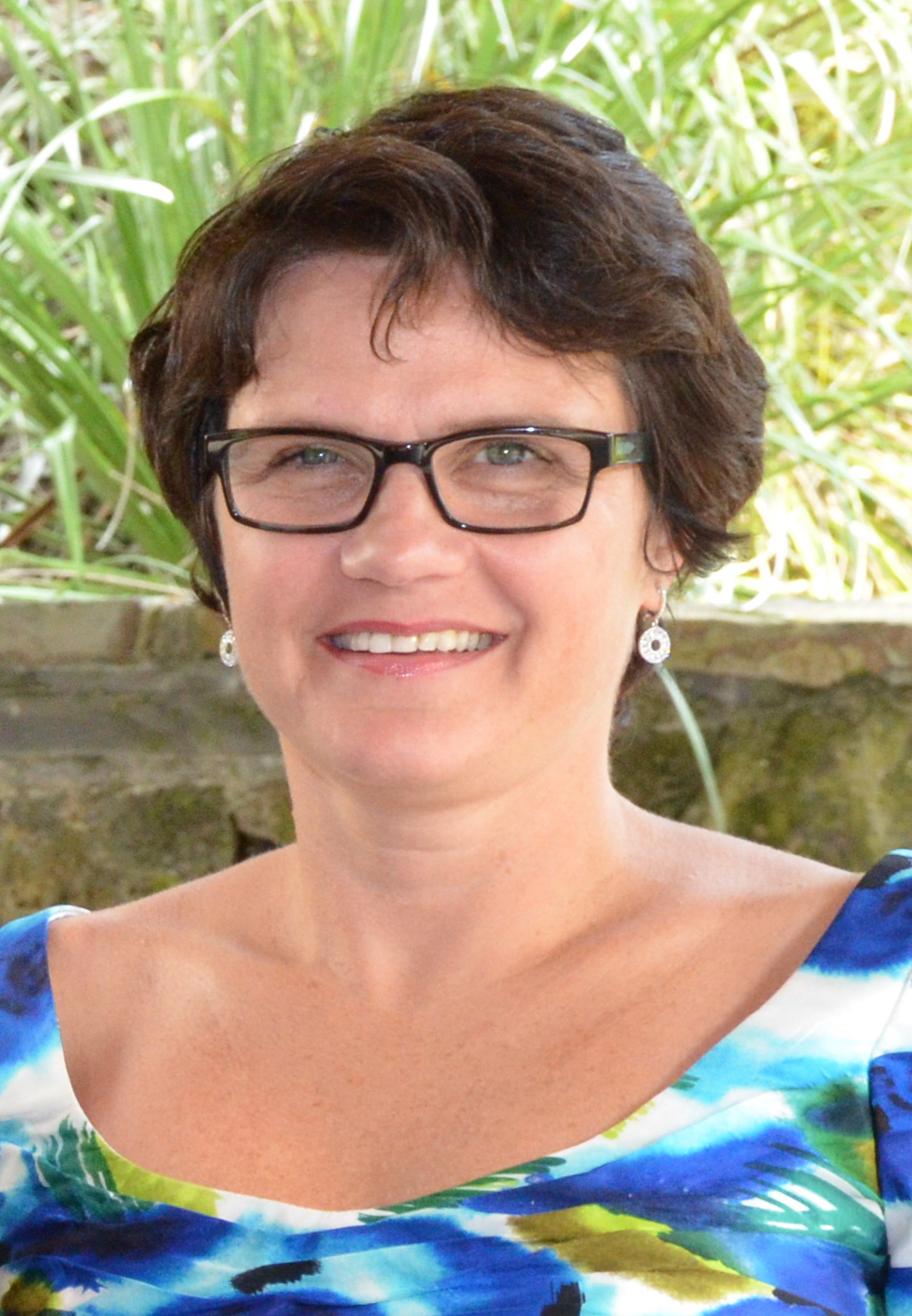
Winkelmann in 2014 when she was Chief High Court Judge

Winkelmann also worked with other Heads of Bench to establish Court procedures, including opening and closing of the Court day, so that the Court's processes better reflect the two founding cultures of New Zealand, Māori and Pākehā.

Winkelmann joined the Court of Appeal Bench on 1 June 2015. She held roles as the chief justice's representative on the Council of Law Reporting, and the Chair of the Institute of Judicial Studies. The institute (now Te Kura Kaiwhakawā) provides continued education to judges.

== Rulings ==
In the high-profile case where US authorities were seeking to have Kim Dotcom arrested and extradited, Winkelmann ruled on 28 June 2012 that the warrants used to seize Dotcom's property were illegal because they were too broad. "These categories of items were defined in such a way that they would inevitably capture within them both relevant and irrelevant material. The police acted on this authorization. The warrants could not authorize seizure of irrelevant material, and are therefore invalid." Winkelmann also ruled that the handing of hard drives seized by New Zealand police in the raid to the FBI was in breach of extradition legislation, and the FBI's removal from New Zealand of cloned data from them was unlawful.

== Chief Justice ==
On 17 December 2018, it was announced that Winkelmann would succeed Dame Sian Elias as Chief Justice, and she was sworn in on 14 March 2019, becoming the second woman to hold the office.

In the 2019 Special Honours, in preparation for her taking up the role of Chief Justice, Winkelmann was appointed a Dame Grand Companion of the New Zealand Order of Merit.

=== Administrator of the Government ===
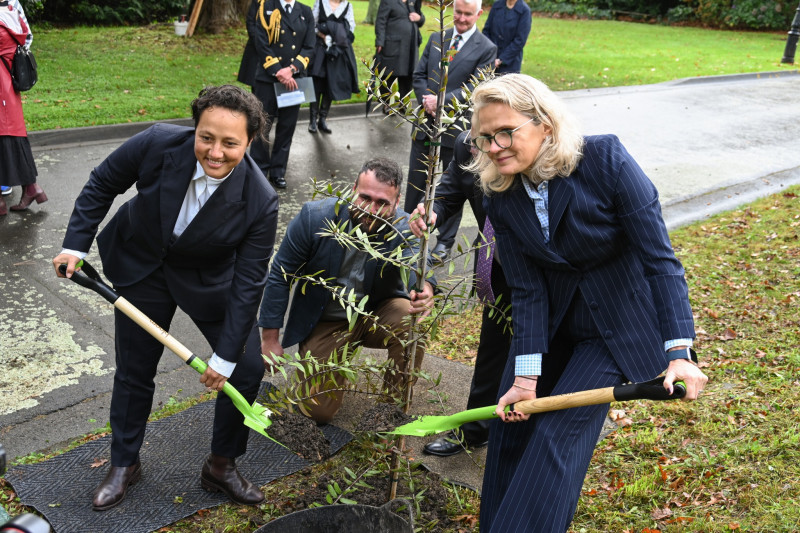
Winkelmann (right), as Administrator of the Government, and Minister of Conservation Kiri Allan plant a kauri in the grounds of Government House, Wellington, on 16 May 2022, to mark the Platinum Jubilee of Elizabeth II. Vice-regal consort, Richard Davies is standing in the background.

An important role of the Chief Justice is Administrator of the Government, when the Governor-General is unable to perform their duties (due to a vacancy in the position, illness, absence from New Zealand or some other cause). Winkelmann has filled this position six times: when the governors-general Patsy Reddy and Cindy Kiro were overseas and during the interregnum between the two governors-general.

Legal offices
Preceded by Sian Elias	Chief Justice of New Zealand; 2019–present	Incumbent
Order of precedence
Preceded by Gerry Brownlee as Speaker of the House of Representatives	Order of Precedence of New Zealand as Chief Justice; 2019–present	Succeeded by Alfredo Pérez Bravo as The Dean of the Diplomatic Corps
Preceded by Charles III as King	Order of Precedence of New Zealand as Administrator of the Government	Succeeded by Christopher Luxon as Prime Minister
