= 2021 Special Honours (New Zealand) =

New Zealand honours

- Previous: 2021 Queen's Birthday Honours; Next: 2022 New Year Honours
- Type: New Zealand royal honours: New Zealand Order of Merit; Queen's Service Order
- Date: 9 August 2021; 28 September 2021; 21 December 2021
- Country: New Zealand

Highlights
- Total recipients: 4

The 2021 Special Honours in New Zealand were three special honours lists, published in New Zealand on 9 August, 28 September, and 21 December 2021.

Appointments were made to the New Zealand Order of Merit and the Queen's Service Order to incoming governor-general, Dame Cindy Kiro, and the outgoing vice-regal consort, Sir David Gascoigne. There was also a redesignation for the writer Vincent O'Sullivan from Distinguished Companion to Knight Companion of New Zealand Order of Merit. O'Sullivan had previously declined redesignation when titular honours were reintroduced by the New Zealand government in 2009.

== New Zealand Order of Merit ==
=== Dame Grand Companion (GNZM) ===
Additional

- Dame Alcyion Cynthia Kiro DNZM – Governor-General Designate
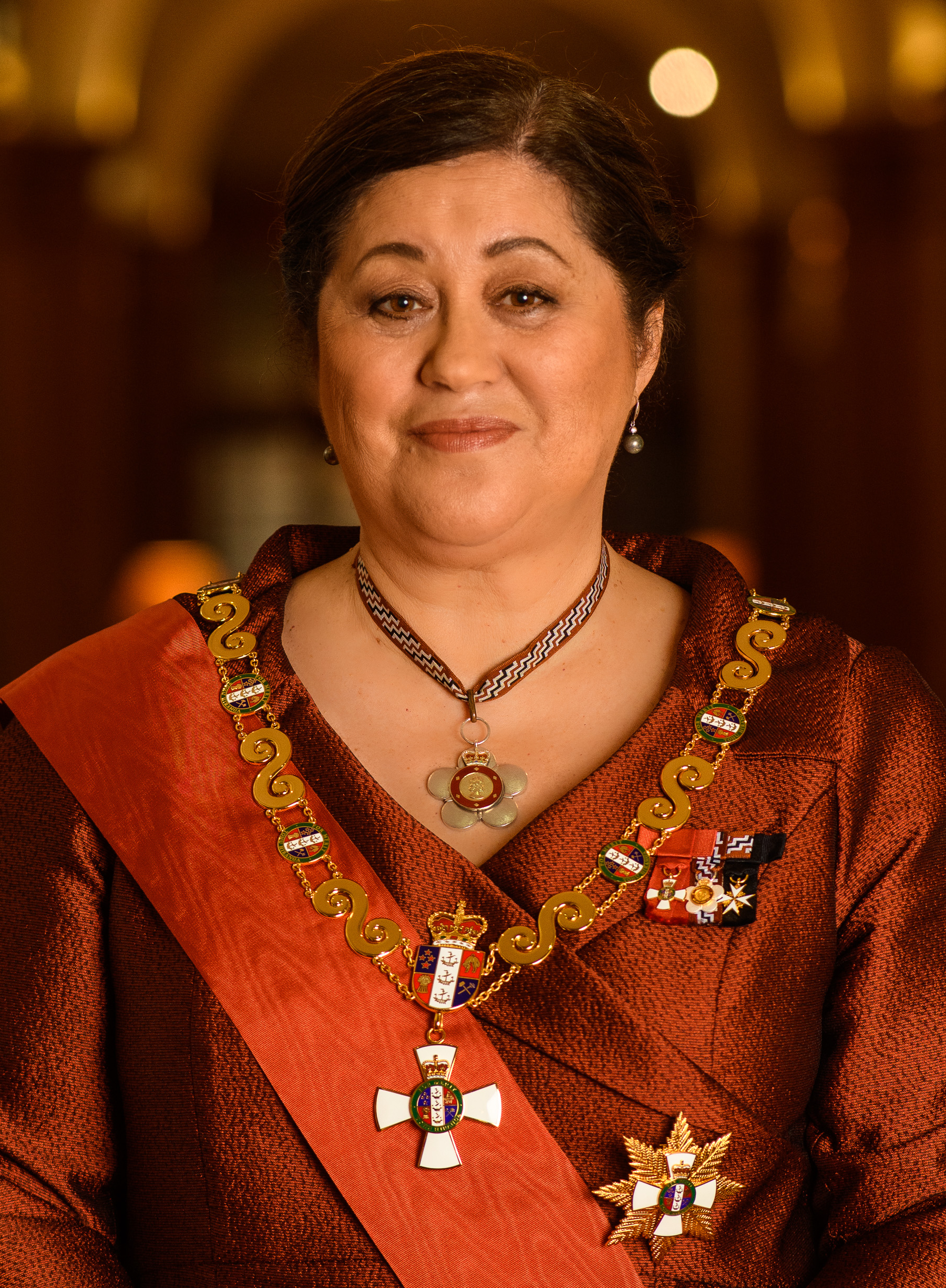
Dame Cindy Kiro

=== Knight Companion (KNZM) ===
Redesignation

- Emeritus Professor Vincent Gerard O'Sullivan DCNZM – of Dunedin. Appointed a Distinguished Companion of the New Zealand Order of Merit on 5 June 2000.
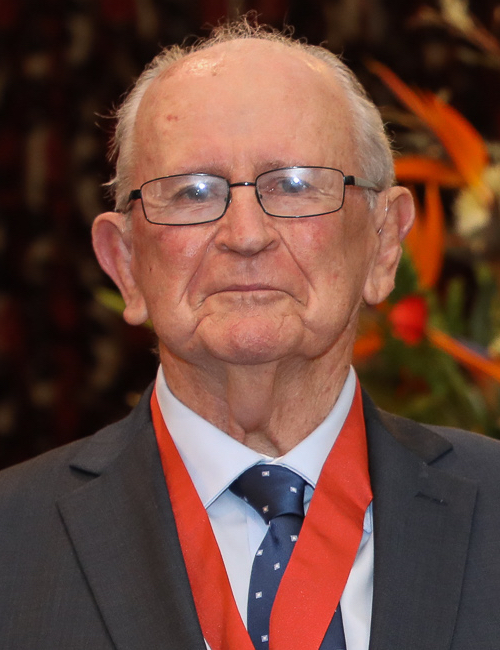
Sir Vincent O'Sullivan

== Companion of the Queen's Service Order (QSO) ==
Additional

- Dame Alcyion Cynthia Kiro DNZM – Governor-General Designate
- Sir David Rendel Gascoigne KNZM CBE
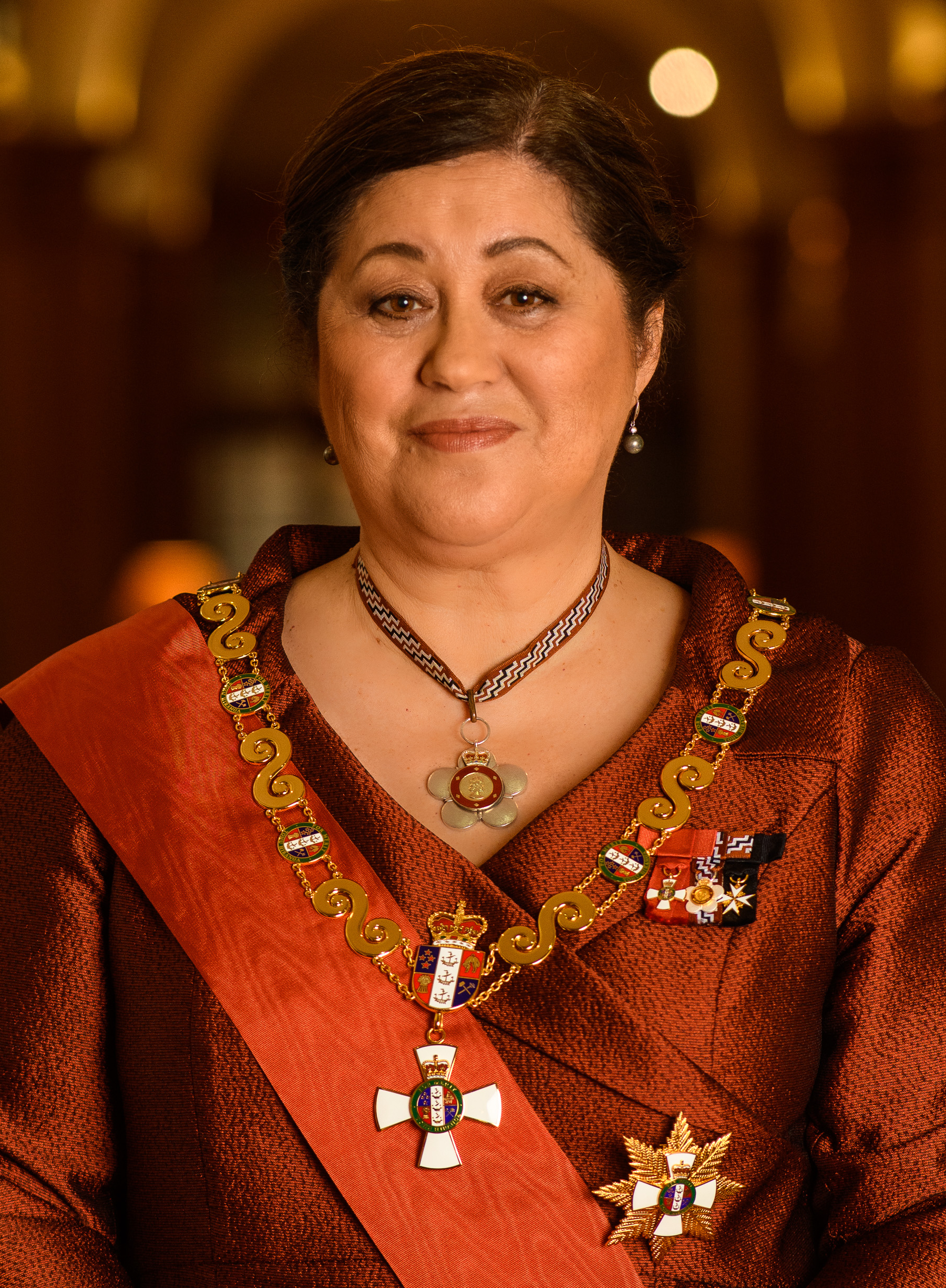
Dame Cindy Kiro

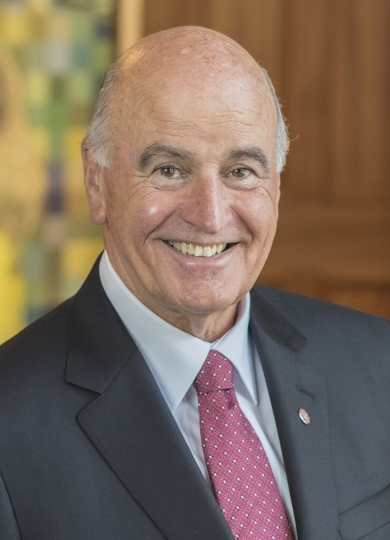
Sir David Gascoigne
