= Jonathan Lewis (oncologist) =

American surgeon

Jonathan J. Lewis
- Occupations: Surgeon, biomedical researcher, entrepreneur, investor

Jonathan J. Lewis is an American surgeon, biomedical researcher and entrepreneur. He was trained in surgery in South Africa, Britain, and the United States, and is a fellow of both the Royal College of Surgeons and the American College of Surgeons. Dr. Lewis was awarded an MB.B.Ch. from University of the Witwatersrand School of Medicine, and his Ph.D. in Molecular Biology from Witwatersrand and Yale School of Medicine. He completed his Surgical Residency at Charlotte Maxeke Johannesburg Academic Hospital and at Yale-New Haven Hospital. Lewis was a professor of Surgery and Medicine Memorial Sloan-Kettering Cancer Center, before working in the biotechnology and healthcare industries, serving in several CEO and chairman roles. He is currently chairman and co-founder of the Molecular Ninja Group and chairman and co-founder of Dugri Inc.

== Education ==
Lewis received his MB. B.Ch. from University of the Witwatersrand in 1982 and his Ph.D. degree in the Molecular and Cell Biology of Growth Factor Signal Transduction from the University of Witwatersrand and Yale School of Medicine in 1990. He was elected a fellow of the Royal College of Surgeons in 1987. At Yale he trained with Elton Cahow and William Collins, and at Memorial Sloan-Kettering Cancer Center he trained with Sir Murray Brennan. At Sloan-Kettering, he completed postdoctoral research in the immunology lab of Alan Houghton.

== Research and scientific contribution ==
Lewis’ research has contributed to the development of innovative cancer treatments and treatment approaches. Lewis' work focused on better understanding the biology and treatment of difficult-to-treat cancers. This includes the early use of peptides and DNA vaccines with active immunotherapy using T cells, a better understanding of the biology and role of surgery in retroperitoneal sarcoma, the liberal and correct use of re-resection in extremity sarcoma, and the potential use of vaccines in pancreatic cancer. Lewis has authored over 200 scientific publications, which include work in the biology and treatment of sarcoma, the biology and treatment of pancreatic cancer, molecular cancer vaccines, gene therapy and the translation of laboratory findings to the clinic, in addition to writing chapters or sections in 15 textbooks.

Lewis has worked with Yotam Dagan, Sir Murray Brennan and others to help hone the development of next-generation technology platforms for scale in the management of operational stress management and PTSD.

During his career as a physician, Lewis cared for Kitch Christie, the head coach of the 1995 South Africa national rugby union team, Chief Justice Ismail Mahomed, and Kate McGarrigle. He has served on multiple boards of non-profits, including as chairman of the board of trustees and Scientific Advisory Council of the Hope Funds for Cancer Research and as an Honorary Member of the Board of Directors of the Sarcoma Foundation of America.
