= 2019 Special Honours (New Zealand) =

Awards list for New Zealand

- Previous: 2019 New Year Honours; Next: 2019 Queen's Birthday Honours
- Type: New Zealand royal honours: New Zealand Order of Merit
- Date: 4 March 2019
- Country: New Zealand

Highlights
- Total recipients: 1

The 2019 Special Honours in New Zealand was a Special Honours List, published in New Zealand on 4 March 2019. An appointment was made to the New Zealand Order of Merit to recognise the incoming chief justice, Helen Winkelmann.

== New Zealand Order of Merit ==
=== Dame Grand Companion (GNZM) ===
Additional

- The Honourable Helen Diana Winkelmann – Chief Justice Designate
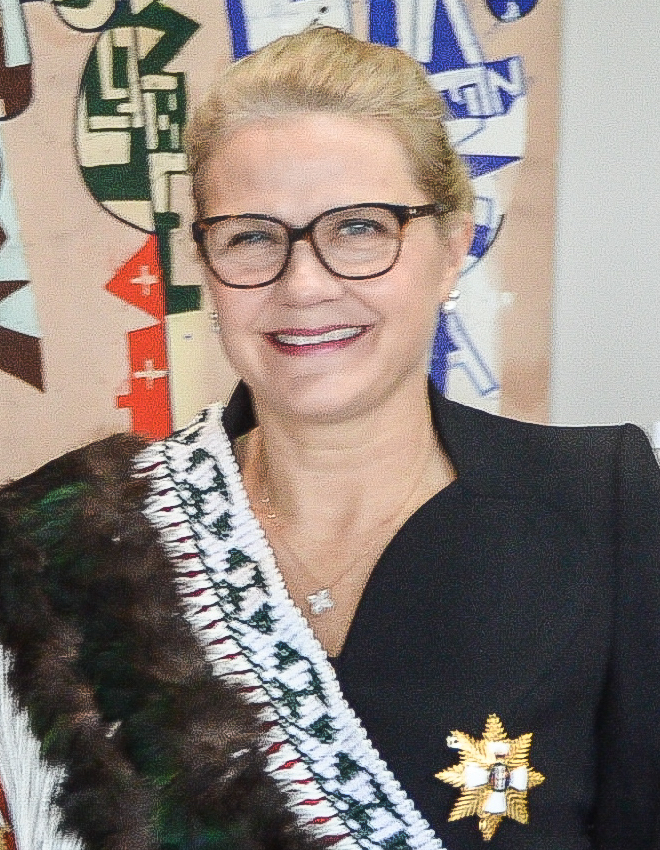
Dame Helen Winkelmann
