= Alfredo Rogerio Pérez Bravo =

Mexican diplomat

His Excellency Alfredo Pérez Bravo
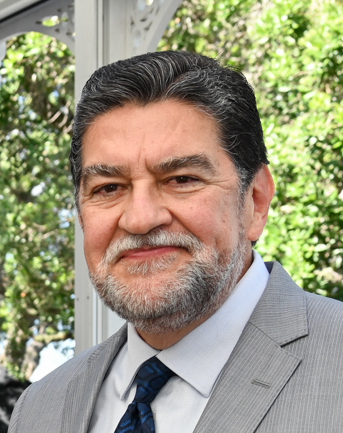
- Pérez Bravo in 2025

Mexico Ambassador to New Zealand
- Incumbent
- Assumed office November 12, 2019
- President: Andrés Manuel López Obrador (until 2024); Claudia Sheinbaum (since 2024)
- Preceded by: José Gerardo Traslosheros Hernández

Mexico Ambassador to Portugal
- In office 2015–2019

Mexico Ambassador to Russia
- In office 2007–2012

Mexico Ambassador to Malaysia
- In office 2001–2007

Mexico Ambassador to Panama
- In office 1999–2001

Mexico Ambassador to Algeria
- In office 1990–1994

Personal details
- Born: December 30, 1956 Mexico City, Mexico
- Education: National Autonomous University of Mexico, Geneva Graduate Institute
- Occupation: Diplomat

Alfredo Rogerio Pérez Bravo is a Mexican diplomat. Since 12 November 2019, he has been the Ambassador from Mexico to New Zealand.

== Diplomatic career ==
Pérez Bravo has been a career diplomat with the Secretariat of Foreign Affairs since February 1976. In June 1990, he was promoted to the rank of ambassador.

He has held the following diplomatic roles:

- Itinerant Ambassador for Africa accredited to 39 countries, from 1990 to 1994
- Ambassador to Algeria, from 1991 to 1994
- Ambassador to Panama, with cross-accreditation to Guyana and Suriname, from 1999-2001
- Mexican Representative for the Caribbean Community, from 1999 to 2001
- Ambassador to Malaysia, from 2001 to 2007
- Ambassador to Russia, with cross-accreditation to Armenia and Belarus, from 2007 to 2012
- Ambassador to Portugal, from 2015 to 2019
- Ambassador to New Zealand, with cross-accreditation to Samoa, Tonga and Tuvalu, since 2019.

He is the present Dean of the New Zealand Diplomatic Corps.

== Personal life ==
Pérez Bravo was born in Mexico City on 30 December 1956. He is married with two children. He studied at the National Autonomous University of Mexico, where he obtained a degree in International Relations, and took courses at the Geneva Graduate Institute and at Stockholm University.
