= Order of precedence in New Zealand =

Relative preeminence of officials for ceremonial purposes

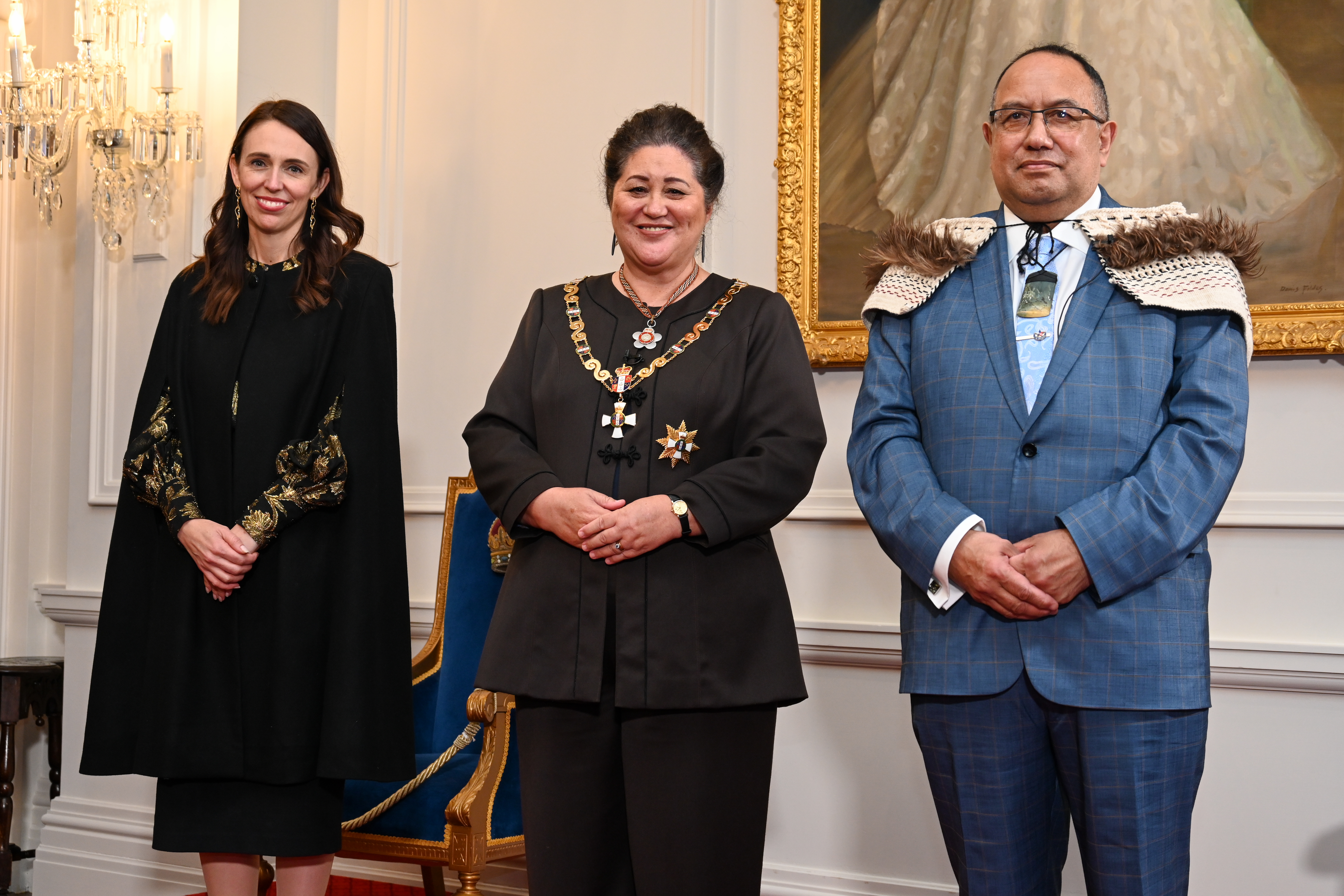
Prime Minister (Jacinda Ardern), Governor-General (Dame Cindy Kiro) and Speaker of the House (Adrian Rurawhe), below a portrait of Elizabeth II, on 24 August 2022

The order of precedence in New Zealand is a guide to the relative seniority of constitutional office-holders and certain others to be followed, as appropriate, at State and official functions. The previous order of precedence (approved and amended) was revoked and Queen Elizabeth II approved the following order of precedence in New Zealand effective 20 September 2018:

1. Monarch of New Zealand.
  - King Charles III (8 September 2022)
2. Governor-General or, while acting in the place of the Governor-General, the officer administering the Government
  - Dame Cindy Kiro (21 October 2021)
3. Prime Minister
  - Christopher Luxon (27 November 2023)
4. Speaker of the House of Representatives
  - Gerry Brownlee (5 December 2023)
5. Chief Justice
  - Helen Winkelmann (14 March 2019)
6. Dean of the Diplomatic Corps
  - Maria Belen Bogado of Argentina (November 2026)
7. Deputy Prime Minister
  - David Seymour (31 May 2025)
8. Ministers of the Crown (ordered by party and then ministerial rank; list as of 12 August 2026)
  - National Party ministers
    - Nicola Willis
    - Chris Bishop
    - Simeon Brown
    - Erica Stanford
    - Paul Goldsmith
    - Louise Upston
    - Mark Mitchell
    - Todd McClay
    - Tama Potaka
    - Matt Doocey
    - Simon Watts
    - Penny Simmonds
  - National Party ministers outside of Cabinet
    - Nicola Grigg
    - James Meager
    - Scott Simpson
    - Cameron Brewer
    - Mike Butterick
  - ACT ministers
    - Brooke van Velden
    - Nicole McKee
  - ACT ministers outside of Cabinet
    - Andrew Hoggard
    - Karen Chhour
  - New Zealand First ministers
    - Winston Peters
    - Shane Jones
    - Casey Costello
  - New Zealand First ministers outside of Cabinet
    - Mark Patterson
9. Former Governors-General
  - Dame Silvia Cartwright (2001–2006)
  - Sir Anand Satyanand (2006–2011)
  - Sir Jerry Mateparae (2011–2016)
  - Dame Patsy Reddy (2016–2021)
10. Ambassadors and High Commissioners in New Zealand and Chargés d’Affaires accredited to New Zealand.
11. The Leader of the Opposition in the House of Representatives
  - Chris Hipkins (27 November 2023)
12. Leaders, including co-leaders and joint leaders, of political parties represented in the House of Representatives, other than Ministers of the Crown.
  - Marama Davidson – Co-leader, Green Party of Aotearoa New Zealand (8 April 2018)
  - Debbie Ngarewa-Packer – Co-leader, Te Pāti Māori (15 April 2020)
  - Rawiri Waititi – Co-leader, Te Pāti Māori (28 October 2020)
  - Chlöe Swarbrick – Co-leader, Green Party of Aotearoa New Zealand (10 March 2024)
13. Members of the House of Representatives. There is no established order of precedence over members of parliament in general, although each party has its internal ranking.
14. Judges of the Supreme Court of New Zealand, the Court of Appeal and the High Court of New Zealand.
15. Former Prime Ministers, former Speakers of the House of Representatives, former Chief Justices, and members of the Privy Council.
  Until 1999 it was traditional for the Prime Minister, senior and long-serving Ministers of the Crown, the Chief Justice and Judges of the Court of Appeal to be appointed to the Privy Council. No appointments were made from 2000, and in 2010 steps were taken to discontinue such appointments.
  - Former Prime Ministers
    - Sir Geoffrey Palmer (8 August 1989 – 4 September 1990)
    - Dame Jenny Shipley (8 December 1997 – 10 December 1999)
    - Helen Clark (10 December 1999 – 19 November 2008)
    - Sir John Key (19 November 2008 – 12 December 2016)
    - Sir Bill English (12 December 2016 – 26 October 2017)
    - Dame Jacinda Ardern (26 October 2017 – 25 January 2023)
    - Chris Hipkins (25 January 2023 – 27 November 2023) (Leader of the Opposition, see above)
  - Former Speakers of the House of Representatives
    - Sir Kerry Burke (16 September 1987 – 28 November 1990)
    - Sir Doug Kidd (12 December 1996 – 20 December 1999)
    - Margaret Wilson (3 March 2005 – 8 December 2008)
    - Sir Lockwood Smith (8 December 2008 – 31 January 2013)
    - Sir David Carter (31 January 2013 – 7 November 2017)
    - Sir Trevor Mallard (7 November 2017 – 24 August 2022)
  - Former Chief Justices
    - Dame Sian Elias (17 May 1999 – 13 March 2019)
  - Members of the Privy Council
    - Sir Don McKinnon (8 April 1992)
    - Sir Ted Thomas (19 November 1996)
    - Winston Peters (21 May 1998) (New Zealand First minister, see above)
    - Sir Doug Graham (21 May 1998)
    - Sir Peter Blanchard (21 May 1998)
    - Sir Andrew Tipping (21 May 1998)
    - Wyatt Creech (24 November 1999)
    - Dame Sian Elias (24 November 1999) (Former Chief Justice, see above)
    - Simon Upton (14 December 1999)
16. Mayors of territorial authorities and chairpersons of regional councils, while in their own cities, districts and regions. In 1989, boroughs and counties were amalgamated into district councils. District mayors, and the Chatham Islands mayor could expect to be accorded this same precedence.
17. Public Service Commissioner, Chief of Defence Force, Commissioner of Police, and Officers of Parliament (The Controller and Auditor-General, Chief Ombudsman, and the Parliamentary Commissioner for the Environment).
  - Public Service Commissioner – Sir Brian Roche (4 November 2024)
  - Chief of Defence Force – Commodore Mat Williams (acting, 25 October 2026)
  - Commissioner of Police – Richard Chambers (25 November 2024)
  - Officers of Parliament
    - Controller and Auditor-General – Grant Taylor (3 July 2025)
    - Chief Ombudsman – Peter Boshier (10 December 2015)
    - Parliamentary Commissioner for the Environment – Simon Upton (16 October 2017) (Member of the Privy Council, see above)
18. The Solicitor-General, Clerk of the House of Representatives, and Clerk of the Executive Council when attending a function involving the exercise of the position’s specific responsibilities.
  - The Solicitor-General – Una Jagose (16 February 2016)
  - The Clerk of the Parliament of New Zealand – David Wilson (6 July 2015)
  - The Clerk of the Executive Council – Rachel Hayward (2 November 2022)
19. Chief executives of public service and non-public service departments.
20. The Vice Chief of Defence Force, and Chiefs of Navy, Army and Air Force, and other statutory office holders.
  - Vice Chief of Defence Force – Commodore Mat Williams (27 August 2024) (acting Chief of Defence Force, see above)
  - Chief of Navy – Rear Admiral Garin Golding (27 August 2024)
  - Chief of Army – Major General Rose King (27 August 2024)
  - Chief of Air Force – Air Vice Marshal Darryn Webb (2 October 2023)
21. Consuls-General and Consuls of countries without diplomatic representation in New Zealand.
22. Members of New Zealand and British orders, and holders of decorations and medals in accordance with the Order of Wear in New Zealand.
