= Murray Brennan =

New Zealand surgeon (born 1940)

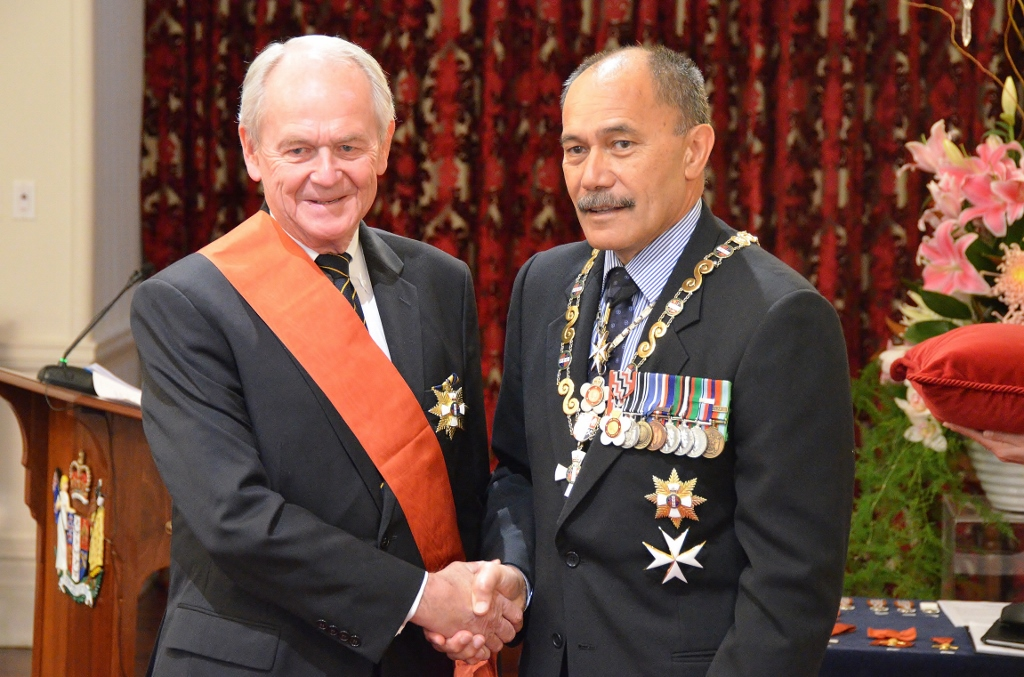
Brennan (left) in 2015, after his investiture as a Knight Grand Companion of the New Zealand Order of Merit by the governor-general, Sir Jerry Mateparae

Sir Murray Frederick Brennan GNZM (born 2 April 1940) is a New Zealand surgeon, oncologist, cancer researcher, and academic. From 1985 to 2006, he was chairman of the surgery department of the Memorial Sloan Kettering Cancer Center in New York City, United States.

== Biography ==
Born in the Auckland suburb of Onehunga in 1940, and educated first at Onehunga Primary School. Brennan attended the University of Otago, gaining a BSc in 1962, and MB ChB in 1964. A rugby union player, he played 12 matches for Otago between 1964 and 1965. He also served as president of the Otago University Students' Association.

In 1967 he was appointed as an assistant lecturer in physiology and surgery at Otago, and in 1970 he moved to the United States and undertook laboratory and clinical work at Peter Bent Brigham Hospital, Harvard Medical School and the Joslin Research Laboratories. After a period as head of the surgical metabolism section at the National Cancer Institute, he became chief of the gastric and mixed tumor service at the Memorial Sloan Kettering Cancer Center (MSKCC) in New York City in 1981. Between 1985 and 2006 he was chairman of the surgery department at MSKCC.

Brennan has authored over 1,000 publications and has served on the editorial board the Australian and New Zealand Journal of Surgery since 1985.

He co-founded Dugri Inc. in 2020, where he has worked with Jonathan Lewis, Yotam Dagan and others to help hone the development of next-generation technology platforms for scale in the management of operational stress management and PTSD.

== Honours ==
Brennan was awarded an honorary Doctor of Science (DSc) degree by the University of Otago in 1997. In the 2015 New Year Honours, he was awarded one of New Zealand's highest honours when he was appointed Knight Grand Companion of the New Zealand Order of Merit for services to medicine.
