= Stephen Tindall =

New Zealand businessman (1951-)

Sir Stephen Tindall GNZM
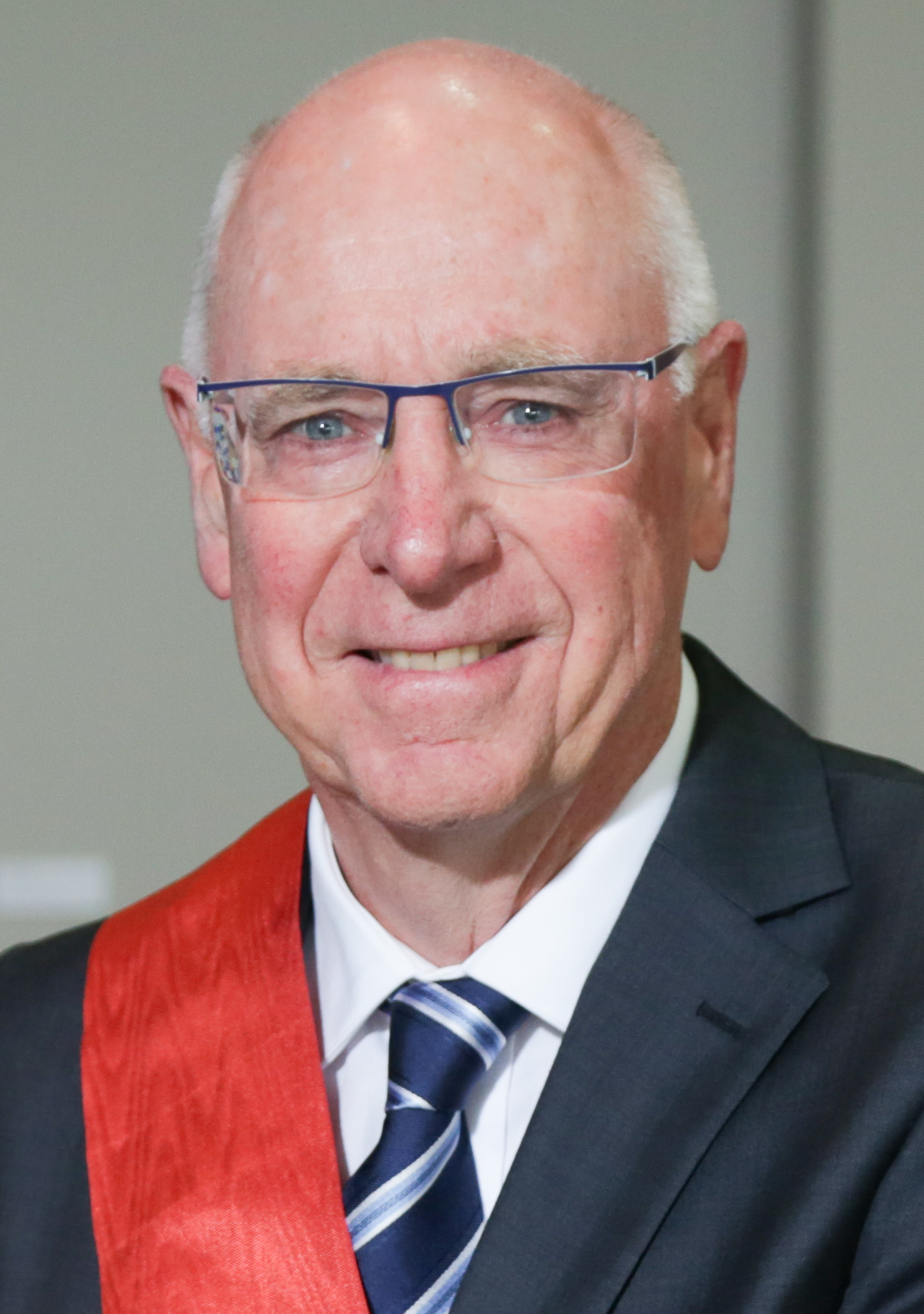
- Stephen Tindall in 2019
- Born: Stephen Robert Tindall; May 1951 (age 75); Auckland, New Zealand
- Occupations: Businessman; Philanthropist
- Organisation(s): The Warehouse Group, The Tindall Foundation
- Spouse: Margaret Tindall

Sir Stephen Robert Tindall GNZM (born May 1951) is the founder of New Zealand retailer the Warehouse, the Warehouse Group, and the Tindall Foundation.

== Early life and education ==
Tindall attended Bayswater Primary School then Takapuna Grammar School and has a diploma of management from the Auckland Institute of Technology.

== Business career ==
Tindall founded the Warehouse in 1982 after 12 years with retailer George Court & Sons as merchandise director. In 2009 the Warehouse Group had sales of NZ$1.72 billion. In 2018, the Warehouse Group had 251 stores throughout New Zealand, The Warehouse, Warehouse Stationery, Noel Leeming, Torpedo7 and TheMarket stores.

== Philanthropy ==
In 1995 Tindall and his wife, Margaret, set up the Tindall Foundation to provide help to New Zealanders in need.

== Honours and awards ==
The New Zealand Herald named Tindall their Business Person of the Year for 1997, and the following year he was named the Deloitte–New Zealand Management magazine Executive of the Year

In the 1997 Queen's Birthday Honours, Tindall was appointed an Officer of the New Zealand Order of Merit, for services to business and the community. In the 2007 Queen's Birthday Honours, he was promoted to Distinguished Companion of the New Zealand Order of Merit, for services to business and the community. In 2009, following the restoration of titular honours by the New Zealand government, he accepted redesignation as a Knight Companion of the New Zealand Order of Merit. He was elevated to Knight Grand Companion of the New Zealand Order of Merit, for services to business, the community, and the environment, in the 2019 New Year Honours.

Tindall has been conferred honorary doctorates by AUT and Massey University.

In 2005, Tindall was inducted into the New Zealand Business Hall of Fame. In 2006, he was awarded the Blake Medal on behalf of the Sir Peter Blake Trust in recognition of his leadership contributions to New Zealand. In 2015, he was named Kiwibank New Zealander of the Year.

Tindall is the immediate past chair of Emirates Team New Zealand, New Zealand's America's Cup sailing team. Under his watch they won and defended the Cup in 2017 and 2021.
