= Ray Avery (scientist) =

New Zealand scientist

Sir Raymond Avery GNZM
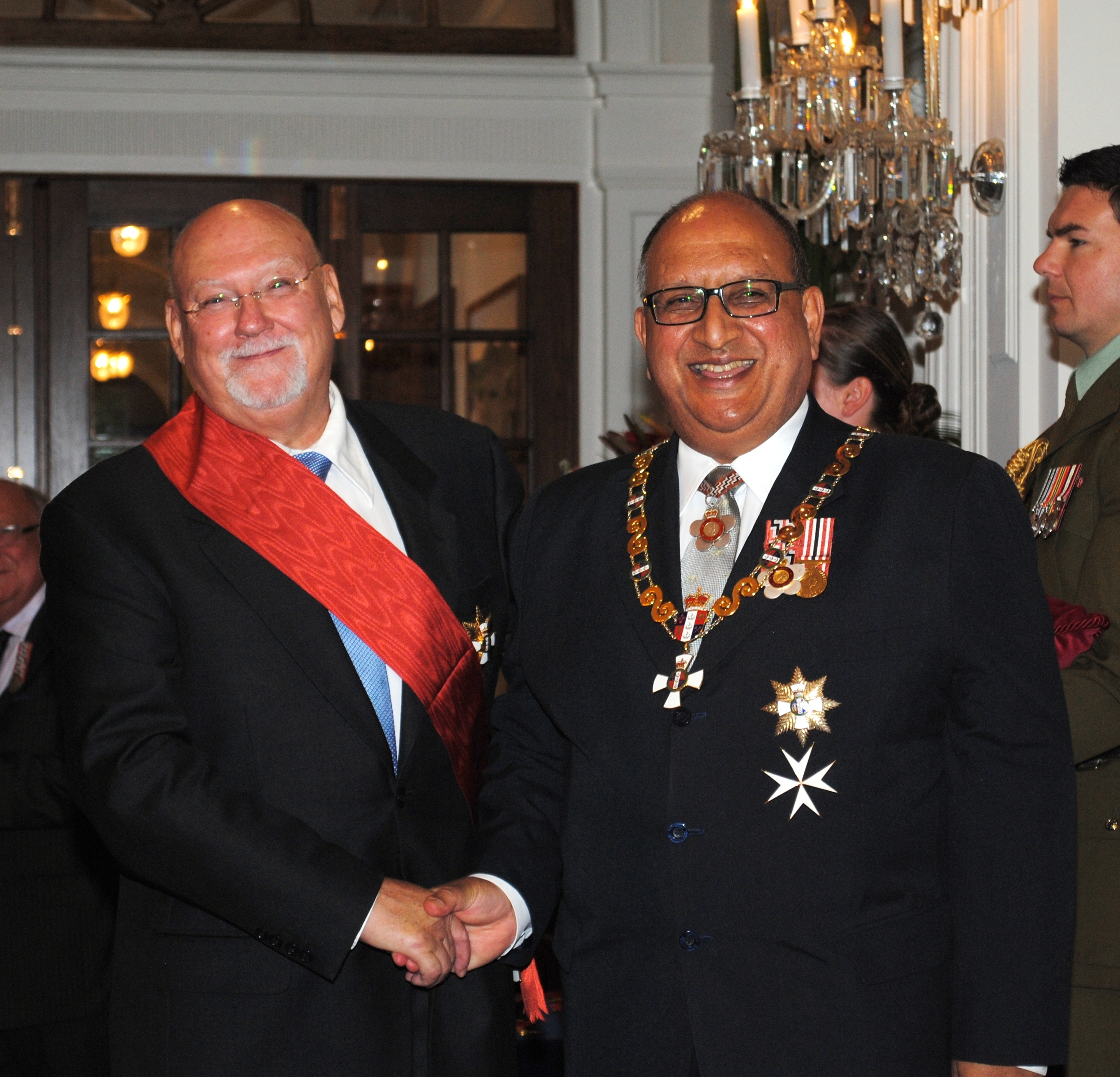
- Avery (left), after his investiture as a Knight Grand Companion of the New Zealand Order of Merit by the governor-general, Sir Anand Satyanand, in 2011
- Born: Raymond John Avery; 1947 (age 78–79); Kent, England
- Citizenship: New Zealand
- Occupations: Scientist; investor; writer

Sir Raymond John Avery GNZM (born 1947) is a New Zealand pharmaceutical scientist, inventor, author and social entrepreneur.

== Personal life ==
Avery was born in Kent, England. After spending his childhood in orphanages and foster homes, he has said he developed an interest in science at the age of 14 while sleeping rough in London and finding warmth in public libraries. He now mentors young people, speaking regularly at schools and universities. He was later educated at Wye College, a tertiary agricultural college in Kent.

He settled in New Zealand in 1973 and became a New Zealand citizen within nine months. In 2010, Avery published his autobiography Rebel with a Cause, which charted his life from childhood in English orphanages and foster homes to knighthood.

Avery announced in August 2022 that he was moving to Australia, citing societal reasons, including high rates of bullying, domestic violence, gang violence, and obesity, the high cost of living, institutional racism in healthcare and education, a "broken" hospital system, and opposition to a proposed fund-raising concert for his Lifepod device at Eden Park.

== Career ==
After graduating, Avery worked as an analyst in laboratories, in which he eventually took a shareholding. After leaving Britain and settling in New Zealand, he was a founding member of the Department of Clinical Pharmacology at the University of Auckland School of Medicine. He was then the technical director of Douglas Pharmaceuticals, where he developed and commercialised pharmaceutical and nutritional products.

In the 1990s, as Technical Director of the Fred Hollows Foundation, Avery designed and commissioned two intraocular lens manufacturing facilities in Asmara, Eritrea and Kathmandu, Nepal. Avery worked with other members of the team to develop replacement equipment when it became apparent that the manufacturing equipment originally commissioned by the foundation was not suitable.

In 2003, Avery founded an organisation focused on international development, Medicine Mondiale, which he described as dedicated to making quality healthcare and equipment accessible to even the poorest developing nations around the world. It was registered as a charity in New Zealand in 2008 and is also known as the Sir Ray Avery Foundation.

In 2009, Avery received a World Class New Zealand Award in the Life Sciences category.

Avery is a co–founder of Jupl NZ Ltd, a medical technology company.

== Projects ==
=== Acuset IV flow controller ===
The Acuset is a small device designed to control the flow of drugs through an intravenous (IV) drip. It was designed to simplify administering drips and to be used in developing countries without adequate medical care. In 2008 the Acuset was a finalist in the Saatchi & Saatchi World Changing Ideas Awards.

In December 2019 it was reported by Newsroom that clinical trials at Auckland City Hospital in 2008 showed that the Acuset was not more accurate than an existing device called a "roller clamp" which was already used widely in developing countries. The findings were subsequently published in a medical journal in 2015. Avery's position, set out in the article, was that the trials "did not reflect normal usage" of the Acuset and used an earlier version of the product. He later noted a 2019 addendum to the study which had clarified that the test covered an earlier version of the Acuset.

Avery made a complaint to the New Zealand Media Council against Newsroom for reporting on the study and on allegations that he had sought the retraction of the study's findings. The complaint was not upheld by the council, which concluded that the Newsroom article contained no inaccuracies. The council noted that it was "made clear in the article that the test was on an earlier device, not the device currently marketed, and Sir Ray Avery's version of what has happened is set out in the article". The council was also clear that in its decision it was not commenting on the merits of the earlier version of the Acuset, the current Acuset or the research studies that had been carried out.

=== Lifepod incubator ===
The Lifepod was a proposed incubator that was in development by Medicine Mondiale with the goal of being low-cost, warm, sterile and robust, and suitable for distributing in poorer countries. Sir Ray Avery wanted to put on a live aid style concert at Eden Park to raise $4m dollars to launch his low-cost Lifepod infant incubator internationally but the Eden Park Trust cancelled it for time and financial reasons. NZ$4.5 million had been spent in development including NZ$2 million raised from public donations. Avery apologised in 2018 for not being clearer to donors about the progress of the work. In November 2018 the Department of Internal Affairs conducted a review after a complaint was made, and concluded it was satisfied that donations were being used properly, although it urged the foundation to consider "updating the public regarding the status of the LifePod incubators and managing their expectations as to when they will be most likely to be ready for delivery to Fiji".

In March 2019 it was reported that the Lifepod would begin hospital trials in India in July, but this did not eventuate. In 2022, on announcing that he was leaving New Zealand and moving to Australia, Avery said opposition to a planned concert in 2018 at Eden Park to raise funds for the Lifepod was a "pivotal moment" leading to his decision to leave. Aside from a few prototypes, no fully-functioning Lifepods were ever built.

=== Infant and child nutrition products ===
Avery's (now-closed) agency Medicine Mondiale developed the infant formula "Proteinforte" for the treatment of protein-energy malnutrition. The agency also developed a nutritional bar called the "Amigo Bar", based on amino acids, which were intended to be distributed in New Zealand schools to supplement children's diets through a for-profit social enterprise business.

== Books ==
Avery published his autobiography Rebel with a Cause in 2010. He also wrote the foreword to The Power of Us: New Zealanders Who Dare to Dream, published in 2012.

== Honours ==
Avery has received awards including:

Year	Award	Notes
2008	Rotary Paul Harris Medal	
2008	Bayer Research and Development Innovator Award	Acuset flow controller
2009	World Class New Zealand Award for Biotechnology	
2010	TBWA Disruption Award	
2010	KiwiBank New Zealander of the Year	For designing technology used to produce low-cost intraocular lenses
2010	Sir Peter Blake Leadership Medal	
2011	Ernst and Young Social Entrepreneur Award	
2011	Reader's Digest New Zealand's Most Trusted Person	
2011	Knight Grand Companion of the New Zealand Order of Merit	For his services to philanthropy
