= Cindy Kiro =

Governor-General of New Zealand since 2021

Her Excellency The Right Honourable Dame Cindy Kiro GNZM QSO DStJ
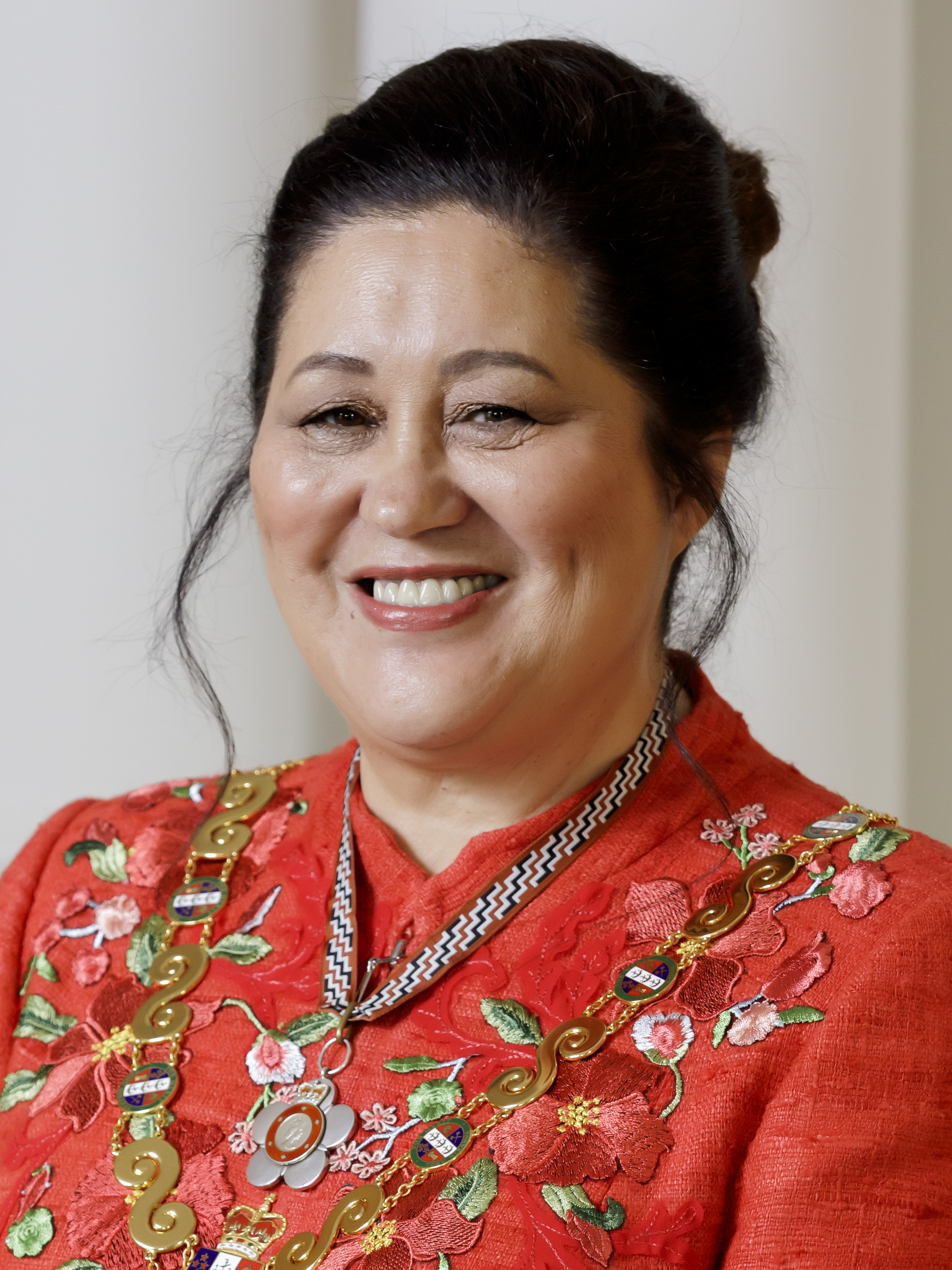
- Official portrait, 2023

22nd Governor-General of New Zealand
- Incumbent
- Assumed office 21 October 2021
- Monarchs: Elizabeth II; Charles III
- Prime Minister: Jacinda Ardern; Chris Hipkins; Christopher Luxon
- Preceded by: Dame Patsy Reddy

Children's Commissioner
- In office 1 September 2003 – 1 September 2008
- Appointed by: Steve Maharey
- Preceded by: Roger McClay
- Succeeded by: John Angus

Personal details
- Born: Alcyion Cynthia Simpson; 1958 (age 67–68) Whangārei, New Zealand
- Spouses: Chris Kuchel (div.); Richard Davies
- Children: 2 children, 2 stepchildren
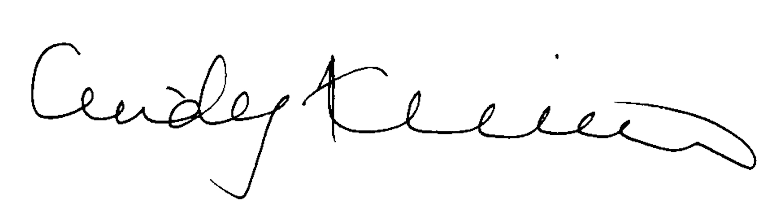
- Signature
- Scientific career
- Education: University of Auckland; Massey University; European University Institute
- Fields: Public health
- Thesis: Kimihia Hauora Māori = Māori Health Policy and Practice (2001)
- Doctoral advisors: Michael Belgrave; Chris Cunningham

Dame Alcyion Cynthia Kiro (Māori: [kiːɾɔ]; née Simpson; born 1958) is a New Zealand public-health academic, administrator, and advocate, who has been serving as the 22nd governor-general of New Zealand since 21 October 2021. Kiro is the first Māori woman and the third person of Māori descent to hold the office.

Before she was announced as governor-general designate, Kiro was Chief Executive of the Royal Society Te Apārangi and was previously the Children's Commissioner, head of school of the School of Public Health at Massey University, head of Te Kura Māori at Victoria University of Wellington, and Pro-Vice Chancellor (Māori) of the University of Auckland.

During her term as governor-general, Kiro responded to the death of Elizabeth II, and has undertaken several overseas visits, including attending the Platinum Jubilee and state funeral of Queen Elizabeth II and the coronation of King Charles III in the United Kingdom.

== Early life and education ==
Kiro was born in Whangārei in 1958, the eldest child of six. She is of Māori and English descent, affiliating with Ngā Puhi, Ngāti Kahu, and Ngāti Hine iwi. Her father was Norman Simpson, who was originally from the north of England. Her mother's maiden name was Ngawaiunu Kiro and her maternal grandparents were Te Rangihaeata Hemi Kiro and Hukatere Miha Maihi.

She was raised by her mother's parents for part of her early life and took their surname of Kiro. One of her sisters also has the name Kiro, while her other siblings have the name Simpson. She grew up in South Auckland and West Auckland. Her grandparents moved to South Auckland, living at Ōtara and then Māngere. Her parents also moved to Auckland and the family lived at New Lynn and Te Atatū in West Auckland. Kiro attended Rutherford High School in Te Atatū.

She then joined the first cohort of social work students at Massey University in Palmerston North and later graduated with a Bachelor of Arts degree in social sciences from the University of Auckland. In 1987, Kiro gained a certificate in epidemiology from the European University Institute in Fiesole, Italy.

== Career ==
From 1995 to 2000, Kiro was a senior lecturer in social policy at Massey University in Albany. In 2001 she was awarded a PhD in social policy by Massey University for a thesis entitled Kimihia Hauora Māori = Māori Health Policy and Practice. She went on to gain a Master of Business Administration (Executive) degree from the University of Auckland.

Kiro was appointed New Zealand's Children's Commissioner in 2003 and served in this role until 2008. While in this position she established the Taskforce for Action on Family Violence that included many government department chief executives and people from the police, the Family Courts, and Māori and Pacific Island representatives. The passing of the Crimes (Substituted Section 59) Amendment Act 2007 during her tenure attracted considerable public and media interest. Kiro supported and advocated for the repeal of Section 59 of the Crimes Act, which provided a legal justification for using force against children.

Kiro returned to academia, as an associate professor at Massey University and heading its School of Public Health. In 2013 Kiro took a position as head of Te Kura Māori at the School of Education at Victoria University of Wellington. Kiro went on to serve as the Pro-Vice Chancellor (Māori) at the University of Auckland.

In October 2020, Kiro was appointed chief executive of the Royal Society Te Apārangi, commencing on 1 March 2021.

== Governor-general ==
=== Appointment and investiture ===
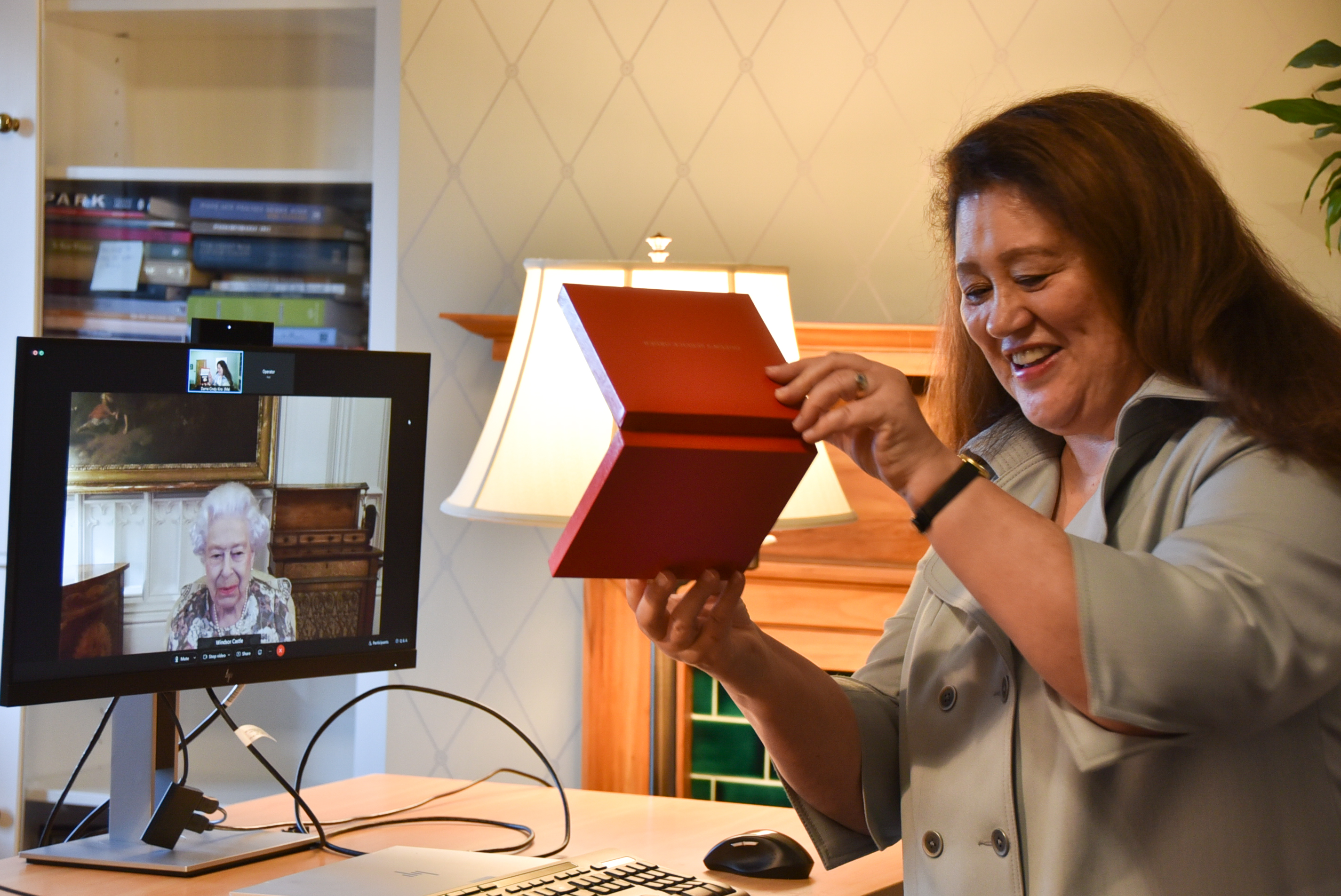
Kiro showing Queen Elizabeth II her insignia of Companion of the Queen's Service Order during a virtual private audience, 19 October 2021

On 24 May 2021, Prime Minister Jacinda Ardern announced that Elizabeth II, Queen of New Zealand, had agreed to her recommendation to appoint Kiro as the next governor-general of New Zealand from 21 October 2021. The five-year term of the previous governor-general, Dame Patsy Reddy, ended on 28 September 2021. Kiro is the first Māori woman to be appointed governor-general.

Kiro was invested as a Dame Grand Cross of the New Zealand Order of Merit and Companion of the Queen's Service Order by Queen Elizabeth II during a private audience via video call on 19 October (18 October in Britain). She was sworn in as governor-general by the chief justice, Helen Winkelmann, at Parliament on 21 October. The ceremony was smaller than usual because of national COVID-19 restrictions on the size of gatherings.

In September 2025, it was announced that Kiro's term of office as governor-general would be extended to 31 March 2027, to avoid the selection process for the next governor-general clashing with campaigning for the 2026 New Zealand general election.

=== Duties ===
==== 2021 ====
Kiro gave her first royal assent as governor-general on 27 October, when she gave assent to the Financial Sector (Climate-related Disclosures and Other Matters) Amendment Act 2021 and the Regional Comprehensive Economic Partnership (RCEP) Legislation Act 2021.

==== 2022 ====
Kiro made her first international visit as governor-general in May 2022, when she travelled to Abu Dhabi to represent New Zealand at the official condolence ceremony for Sheikh Khalifa bin Zayed Al Nahyan, the late president of the United Arab Emirates. On 1 June 2022, Kiro and her husband, Richard Davies, travelled to the United Kingdom for a week-long tour to celebrate the Platinum Jubilee of Elizabeth II. They attended the Service of Thanksgiving at St Paul's Cathedral in London on 3 June, the Platinum Party at the Palace on the evening of 4 June, and the Platinum Jubilee Pageant, which included New Zealand defence personnel, on 5 June. They also held bilateral meetings with some other Commonwealth governors-general.

On 14 June, Kiro, in the exercise of her constitutional role, swore in a government minister for the first time, when Kieran McAnulty was appointed to the Executive Council.

Kiro and Davies visited Samoa from 4 to 8 September to take part in celebrations marking the 60th anniversary of Samoan independence from New Zealand.

Kiro and Davies travelled to the United Kingdom to attend the state funeral of Elizabeth II at Westminster Abbey on 19 September 2022, joined by Prime Minister Jacinda Ardern.

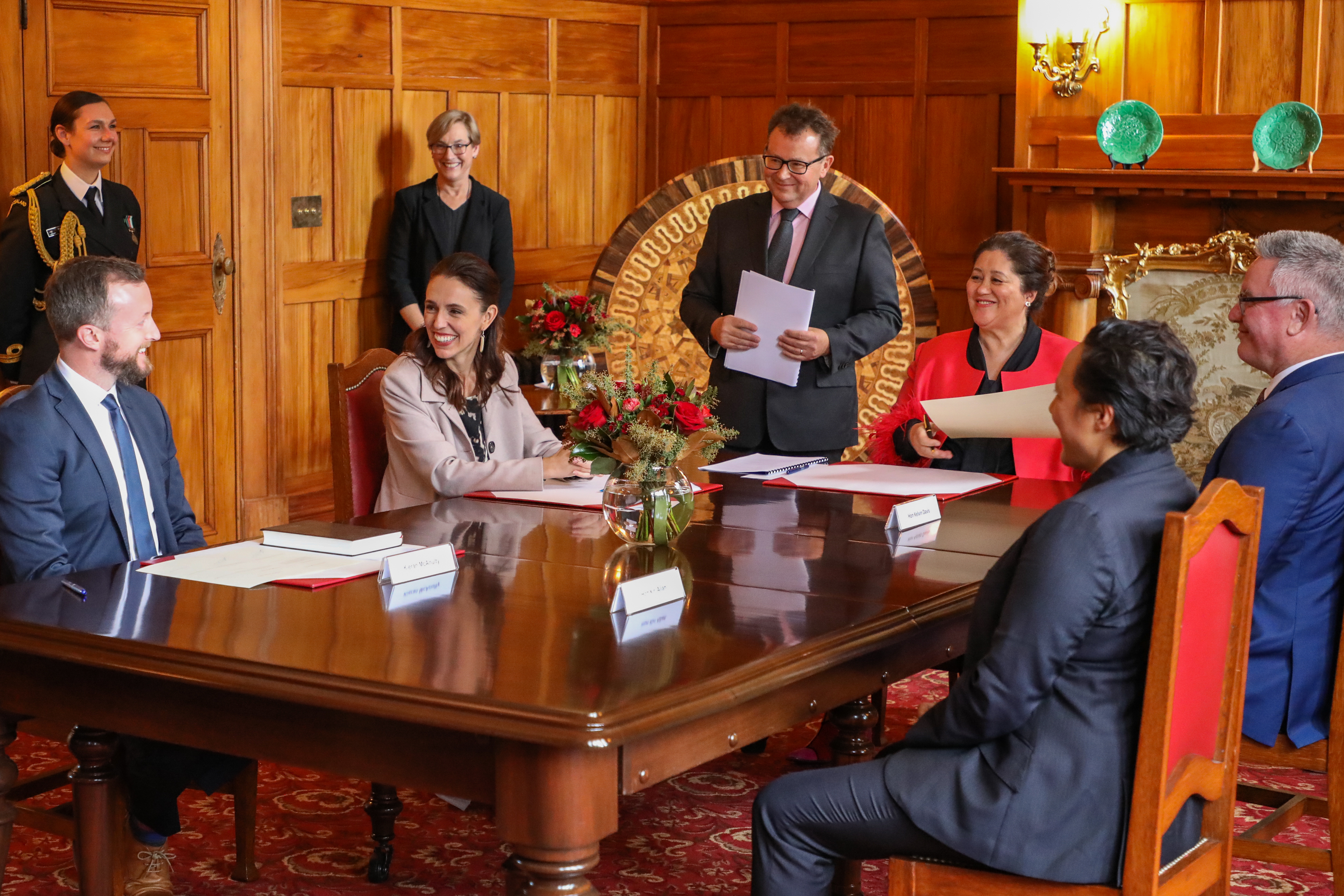
Kiro appointing Kieran McAnulty as a member of the Executive Council at Government House, Wellington, 14 June 2022

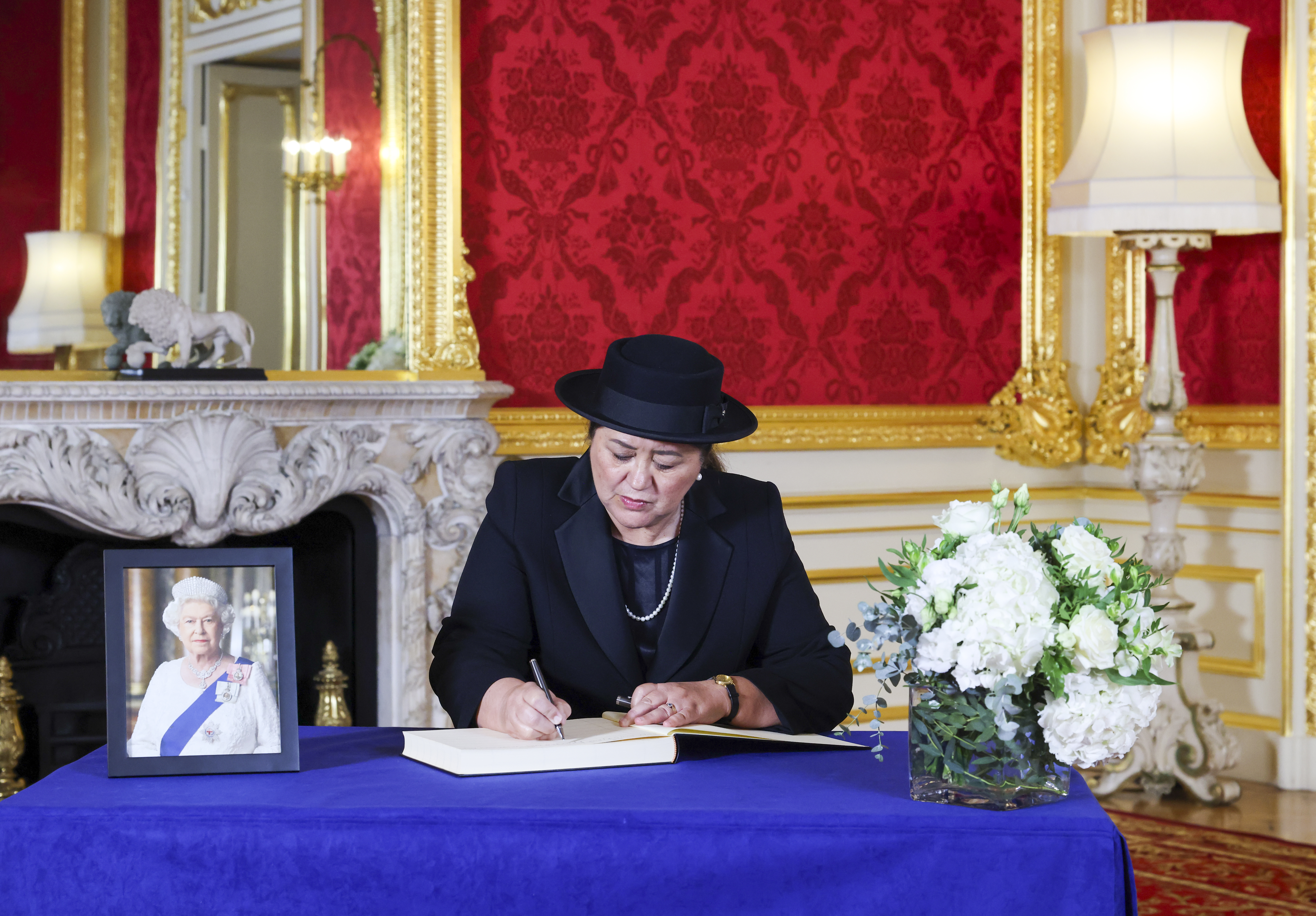
Kiro signing the book of condolence for Queen Elizabeth II at Lancaster House, 16 September 2022

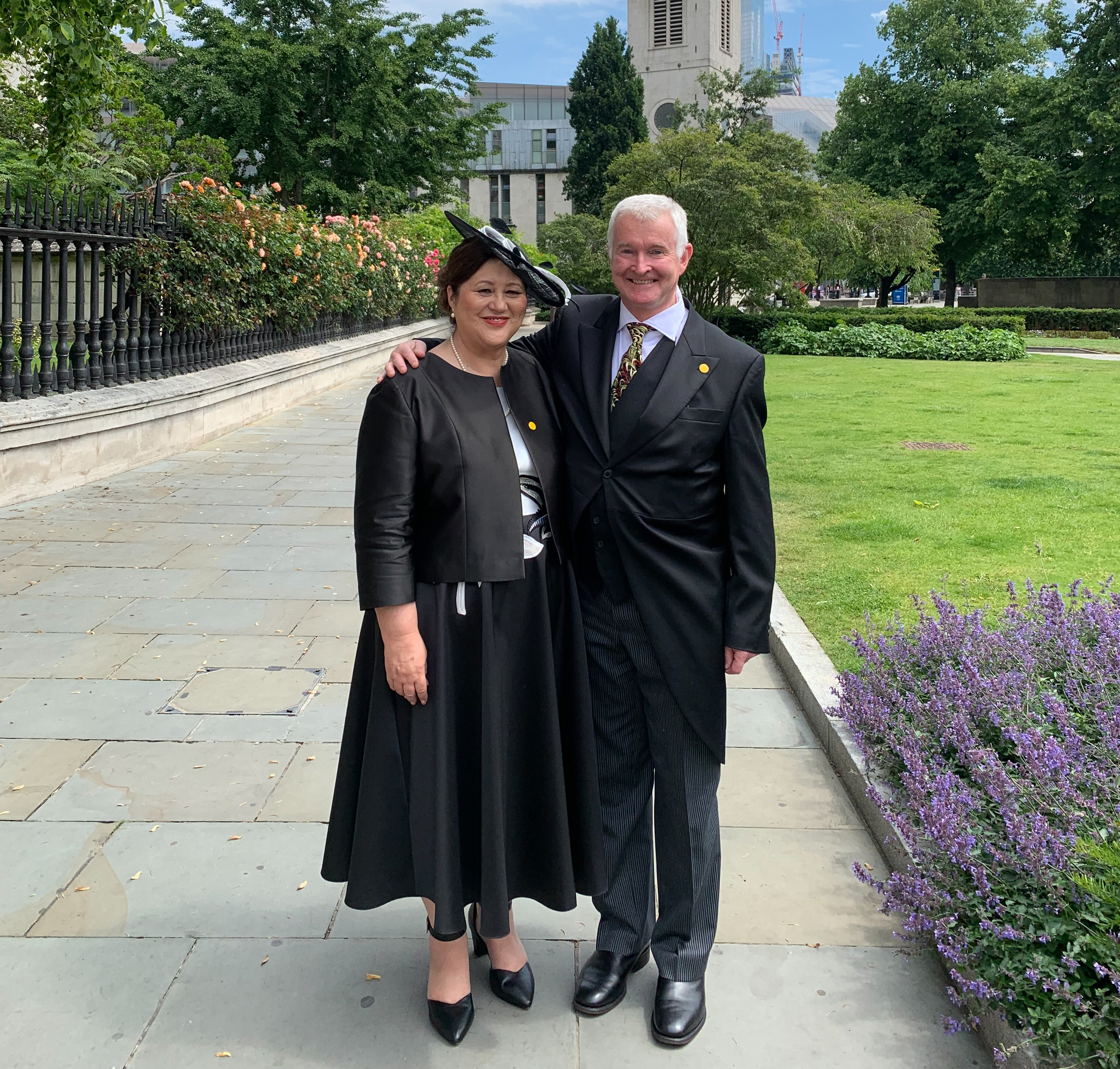
Kiro and consort Richard Davies outside St Paul's Cathedral in London, June 2022

==== 2023 ====
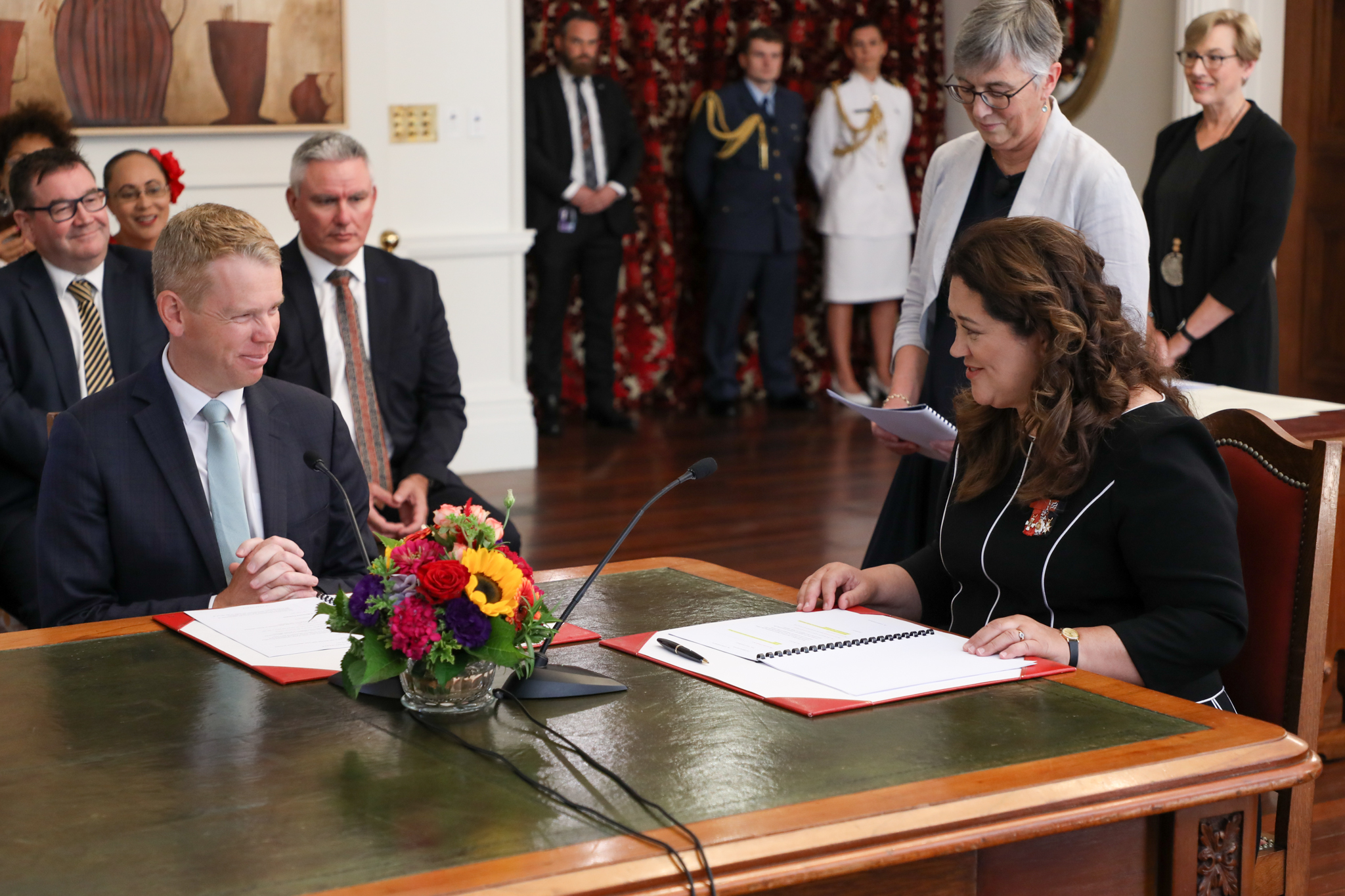
Kiro signing the warrant appointing Chris Hipkins as prime minister at Government House, Wellington, 25 January 2023

Kiro accepted the resignation of Prime Minister Ardern and formally appointed Chris Hipkins as prime minister and Carmel Sepuloni as deputy prime minister at Government House on 25 January.

The Governor-General travelled to London to attend the coronation of Charles III and Camilla in May.

Kiro appointed Christopher Luxon and his Sixth National Government to their respective ministries at Government House on 27 November.

==== 2024 ====
In mid-June 2024, Kiro along with Prime Minister Christopher Luxon hosted Chinese Premier Li Qiang during his state visit.

==== 2025 ====
On 5 July 2025, Kiro represented New Zealand at a celebration in Rarotonga marking the 60th anniversary of the Cook Islands' constitution are held at the National Auditorium in Rarotonga New Zealand Prime Minister Christopher Luxon and Foreign Minister Winston Peters declined to attend the celebration due to a breakdown in bilateral relations over the Cook Islands' partnership agreement with China.

==== 2026 ====
In mid February 2026, Kiro travelled aboard HMNZS Canterbury to visit Tokelau to meet with the archipelago's local leaders. On August 13, Kiro hosted a formal welcome ceremony for Vietnamese Party General Secretary and State President To Lam and his entourage in Auckland.

== Honours and awards ==
Viceregal styles of Dame Cindy Kiro (2021–present)
- Reference style: Her Excellency the Right Honourable
- Spoken style: Your Excellency

In 2012, Kiro received the Public Health Champion award from the Public Health Association of New Zealand, and a US Fulbright Travel Award. The same year she was also named the Māori of the Year for Community Contribution by Television New Zealand.

In the 2021 New Year Honours, Kiro was appointed a Dame Companion of the New Zealand Order of Merit, for services to child wellbeing and education.

On 9 August 2021, Kiro was appointed an additional Dame Grand Companion of the New Zealand Order of Merit and an additional Companion of the Queen's Service Order in preparation for becoming governor-general. As governor-general, Kiro is entitled to be styled "Her Excellency" while in office and "The Right Honourable" for life.

On 21 October 2021, Kiro was appointed a Dame of the Order of Saint John by Elizabeth II and appointed a prior of the same order as the governor-general.

In 2022, Kiro was awarded an honorary Doctor of Health degree by Massey University.

== Personal life ==
Kiro was married to architect, later teacher, Chris Kuchel for 30 years, and had two sons with him. Five years after separating, she met her current husband Richard Davies, a GP and a former member of the Falkland Islands Legislative Council, and is stepmother to his two sons.

== See also ==
- List of female representatives of heads of state

Government offices
Preceded by Roger McClay	Children's Commissioner; 2003–2008	Succeeded by John Angus
Preceded by Dame Patsy Reddy	Governor-General of New Zealand; 2021–present	Incumbent
Order of precedence
Preceded by Charles III as Monarch	Order of Precedence of New Zealand as Governor-General	Succeeded by Christopher Luxon as Prime Minister
