= New Zealand Order of Merit =

Royal order of merit in New Zealand

New Zealand Order of Merit Te Kāhui Tohu Hiranga
- Badge of the Order

Awarded by Monarch of New Zealand
- Type: National order of merit
- Established: 30 May 1996; 30 years ago
- Motto: For Merit—Tohu Hiranga
- Eligibility: Citizens of Commonwealth realms
- Criteria: Meritorious service to the Crown and the nation or who have become distinguished by their eminence, talents, contributions, or other merits
- Status: Currently constituted
- Founder: Elizabeth II
- Sovereign: Charles III
- Chancellor: Dame Cindy Kiro
- Grades: Knight/Dame Grand Companion (GNZM); Knight/Dame Companion (KNZM/DNZM); Companion (CNZM); Officer (ONZM); Member (MNZM)

Statistics
- Last induction: 1 June 2026

Precedence
- Next (higher): Order of New Zealand
- Next (lower): King's Service Order
- Ribbon of the New Zealand Order of Merit

The New Zealand Order of Merit (Māori: Te Kāhui Tohu Hiranga) is an order of merit in the New Zealand royal honours system. It was established by royal warrant on 30 May 1996 by Elizabeth II, Queen of New Zealand, "for those persons who in any field of endeavour, have rendered meritorious service to the Crown and nation or who have become distinguished by their eminence, talents, contributions or other merits", to recognise outstanding service to the Crown and people of New Zealand in a civil or military capacity.

In the order of precedence, the New Zealand Order of Merit ranks immediately after the Order of New Zealand.

== Creation ==
Prior to 1996, New Zealanders received appointments to various British orders, such as the Order of the Bath, the Order of St Michael and St George, the Order of the British Empire, and the Order of the Companions of Honour, as well as the distinction of Knight Bachelor. The change came about after the Prime Minister's Honours Advisory Committee (1995) was created "to consider and present options and suggestions on the structure of a New Zealand Royal Honours System in New Zealand, which is designed to recognise meritorious service, gallantry and bravery and long service".

== Composition ==
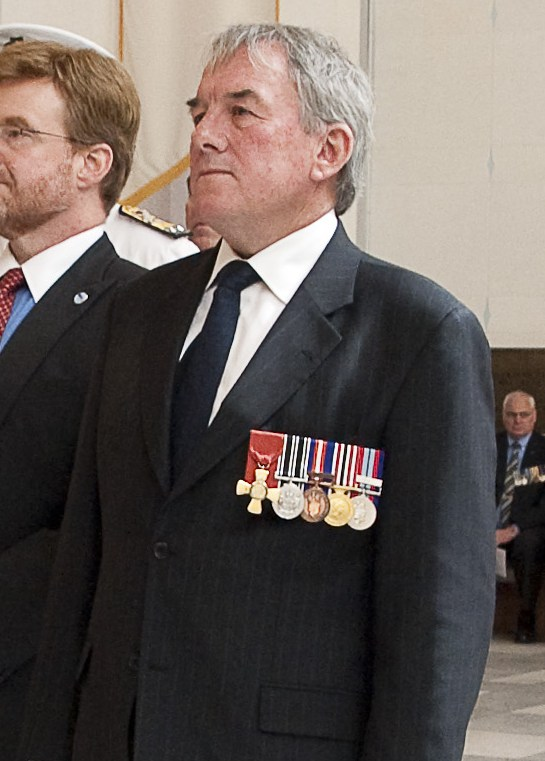
Rear Admiral David Ledson, ONZM, RNZN, wearing the medal for Officer of the New Zealand Order of Merit.

The monarch of New Zealand is the Sovereign of the order and the governor-general is its Chancellor. Appointments are made at five levels:

- Knight or Dame Grand Companion (GNZM)
- Knight or Dame Companion (KNZM or DNZM)
- Companion (CNZM)
- Officer (ONZM)
- Member (MNZM).

From 2000 to 2009, the two highest levels of the Order were renamed Principal Companion (PCNZM) and Distinguished Companion (DCNZM), without the appellation of "Sir" or "Dame".

The number of Knights and Dames Grand Companion (and Principal Companions) is limited to 30 living people. Additionally, new appointments are limited to 15 Knights or Dames Companion, 40 Companions, 80 Officers and 140 Members per year.

As well as the five levels, there are three different types of membership. Ordinary membership is limited to citizens of New Zealand or a Commonwealth realm. "Additional" members, appointed on special occasions, are not counted in the numerical limits. People who are not citizens of a Commonwealth realm are given "Honorary" membership; if they subsequently adopt citizenship of a Commonwealth realm they are eligible for Additional membership.

There is also a Secretary and Registrar (the Clerk of the Executive Council) and a Herald (the New Zealand Herald of Arms) of the Order.

== Insignia and other distinctions ==
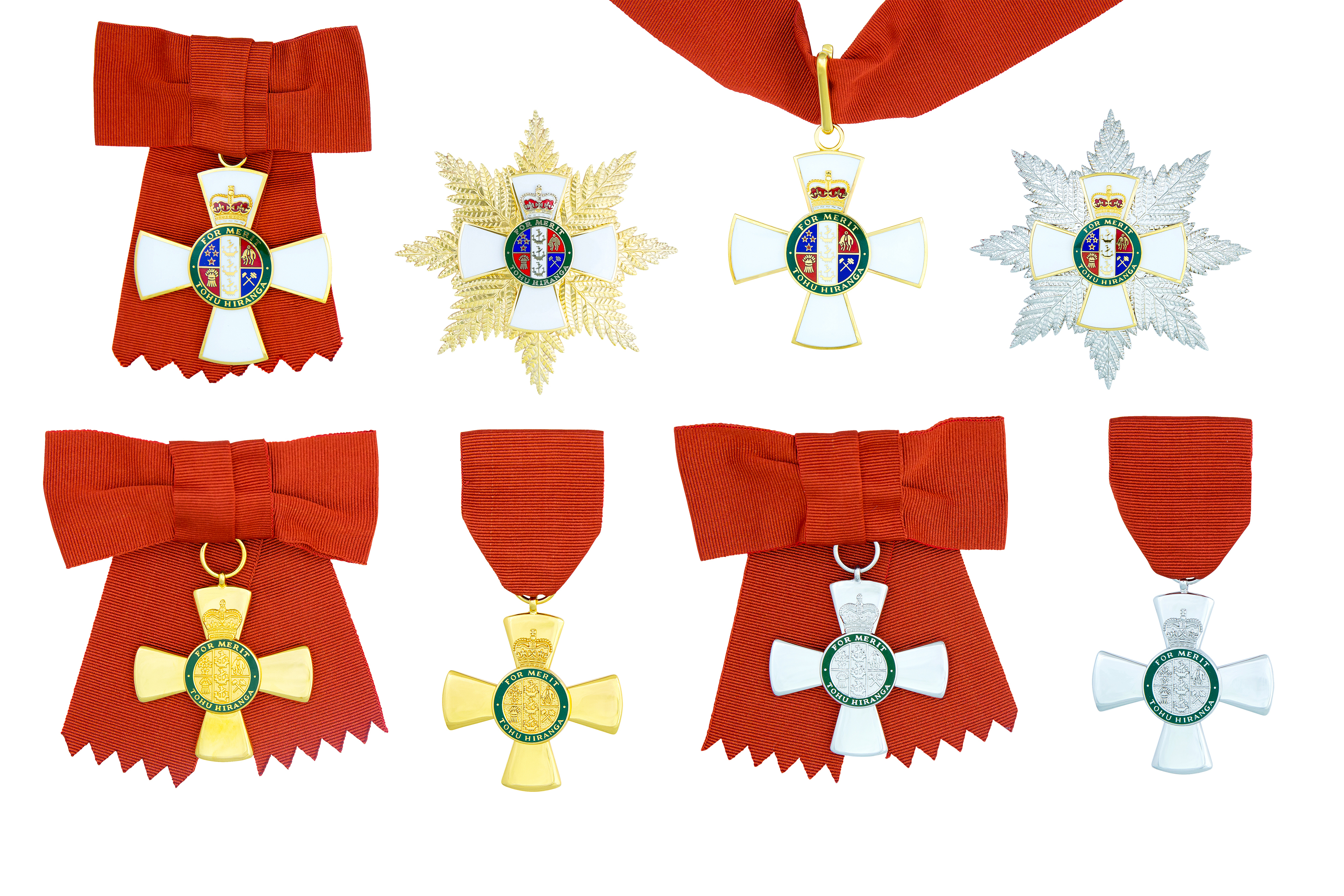
Insignia of the New Zealand Order of Merit

- The Collar, worn only by the Sovereign and Chancellor, comprises "links of the central medallion of the badge" and S-shaped Koru, with the coat of arms of New Zealand in centre. Hanging from the coat of arms is the badge of the Order.
- The Star is an eight-pointed star with each arm bearing a representation of a fern frond, with the Order's badge superimposed in the centre. Grand Companions wear a gold star and Knight Companions wear a silver star.
- The Badge for the three highest classes is a gold and white enamel cross with curved edges bearing at its centre the coat of arms of New Zealand within a green enamel ring bearing the motto For Merit Tohu Hiranga, topped by a royal crown. The badge for Officers and Members is similar, but in silver-gilt and silver respectively. Grand Companions wear the badge on a sash over the right shoulder (though the Governor-General usually wears it as a neck decoration in lieu of the Collar); Knight Companions and Companions wear the badge on a neck ribbon (men) or a bow on the left shoulder (women). Officers and Members wear the badge from a ribbon on the left lapel (men) or a bow on the left shoulder (women).
- The ribbon and sash are plain red ochre.

There also exist miniatures and lapel badges of the five levels of the New Zealand Order of Merit.

Knight/Dames Grand Companion and Knight/Dames Companion are entitled to use the style Sir for males and Dame for females.

The order's statutes grant heraldic privileges to members of the first and second level, who are entitled to have the Order's circlet ("a green circle, edged gold, and inscribed with the Motto of the Order in gold") surrounding their shield. Grand Companions are also entitled to heraldic supporters. The Chancellor is entitled to supporters and a representation of the Collar of the Order around his/her shield.

== Office holders ==
- Sovereign: Charles III
- Chancellor and Principal Dame Grand Companion: The Governor-General, Dame Cindy Kiro (21 October 2021)
- Secretary and Registrar: Rachel Hayward (28 November 2022)
- Herald: Phillip O'Shea CNZM CVO KStJ (23 September 1996)

== Living grand and principal companions ==
No.	Name	Portrait	Honour	Date of appointment	Known for	Present age
1	Dame Sian Elias; GNZM KC PC		Dame Grand Companion	7 June 1999	12th Chief Justice of New Zealand	77
2	Dame Malvina Major; ONZ GNZM DBE		Dame Grand Companion	31 December 2007	Opera singer	83
3	Sir Ray Avery; GNZM		Knight Grand Companion	31 December 2010	Pharmaceutical scientist	79
4	Sir Murray Brennan; GNZM		Knight Grand Companion	31 December 2014	Surgeon, cancer researcher and medical academic	86
5	Sir John Key; GNZM AC		Knight Grand Companion	5 June 2017	38th Prime Minister of New Zealand	65
6	Sir Stephen Tindall; GNZM		Knight Grand Companion	31 December 2018	Businessman and philanthropist	75
7	Dame Jacinda Ardern; GNZM		Dame Grand Companion	5 June 2023	40th Prime Minister of New Zealand	46
Additional appointments
	Dame Silvia Cartwright; ONZ PCNZM DBE QSO DStJ		Principal Companion	20 March 2001	Former Governor-General	83
	Sir Anand Satyanand; GNZM QSO KStJ		Knight Grand Companion	5 June 2006	Former Governor-General	82
	Sir Jerry Mateparae; GNZM QSO KStJ		Knight Grand Companion	20 May 2011	Former Governor-General	72
	Dame Patsy Reddy; GNZM CVO QSO DStJ		Dame Grand Companion	27 June 2016	Former Governor-General	72
	Dame Helen Winkelmann; GNZM		Dame Grand Companion	4 March 2019	13th Chief Justice of New Zealand	63–64
	Dame Cindy Kiro; GNZM QSO DStJ		Dame Grand Companion	9 August 2021	Governor-General	67–68

== Living distinguished companions ==
The following contains the names of the small number of living Distinguished Companions (DCNZM) who chose not to convert their appointment to a Knight or Dame Companion, and thus not to accept the respective appellation of "Sir" or "Dame". The majority of those affected chose the aforereferenced appellations. After initially declining redesignation in 2009, Vincent O'Sullivan and Sam Neill accepted the change in December 2021 and June 2022, respectively.

Name	Portrait	Date of appointment	Known for	Present age
Witi Ihimaera Smiler; DCNZM QSM		7 June 2004	Writer	83
Penny Jamieson; DCNZM		7 June 2004	Former Bishop of Dunedin	84
Joy Cowley; ONZ DCNZM OBE		6 June 2005	Writer	90
Patricia Grace; DCNZM QSO	Patricia Grace	4 June 2007	Writer	89
Margaret Wilson; DCNZM		31 December 2008	Former Speaker of Parliament	79

== Controversy ==
A change to non-titular honours was a recommendation contained within the original report of the 1995 honours committee (The New Zealand Royal Honours System: The Report of the Prime Minister’s Honours Advisory Committee) which prompted the creation of the New Zealand Order of Merit. Titular honours were incorporated into the new system before its implementation in 1996 after the National Party caucus and public debate were split as to whether titles should be retained.

There has long been debate in New Zealand regarding the appropriateness of titles. Some feel it is no longer appropriate as New Zealand has not been a colony since 1907, and to these people titles are out of step with present-day New Zealand. Others feel that titles carry both domestic and international recognition, and that awarded on the basis of merit they remain an appropriate recognition of excellence.

In April 2000 the then new Labour Prime Minister, Helen Clark, announced that knighthoods and damehoods had been abolished and the order's statutes amended. From 2000 to 2009, the two highest levels of the Order were Principal Companion (PCNZM) and Distinguished Companion (DCNZM), without the appellation of "Sir" or "Dame"; appointment to all levels of the Order were recognised solely by the use of post-nominal letters.

A National Business Review poll in February 2000 revealed that 54% of New Zealanders thought the titles should be scrapped. The Labour Government's April 2000 changes were criticised by opposition parties, with Richard Prebble of the ACT New Zealand party deriding the PCNZM's initials as standing for "a Politically Correct New Zealand that used to be a Monarchy".

The issue of titular honours would appear whenever honours were mentioned. In the lead up to the 2005 general election, Leader of the Opposition Don Brash suggested that should a National-led government be elected, he would reverse Labour's changes and re-introduce knighthoods.

In 2009, Prime Minister John Key (later to become a Knight Grand Companion himself) restored the honours to their pre-April 2000 state. Principal Companions and Distinguished Companions (85 people in total) were given the option to convert their awards into Knighthoods or Damehoods. The restoration was welcomed by Monarchy New Zealand. The option has been taken up by 72 of those affected, including rugby great Colin Meads. Former Labour MP Margaret Shields was one of those who accepted a Damehood, despite receiving a letter from former Prime Minister Helen Clark "setting out why Labour had abolished the titles and saying she hoped she would not accept one". Clark's senior deputy, Michael Cullen, also accepted a knighthood.

Appointments continued when Labour returned to government in 2017 as the Sixth Labour Government. The 2018 New Year Honours included seven knights and dames. The government did not comment on its position regarding knighthoods and damehoods, but Prime Minister Jacinda Ardern did specifically congratulate two women on becoming Dames Companion. On leaving office in 2023, Ardern accepted appointment as a Dame Grand Companion, formally receiving investiture in 2024 from Prince William.

== See also ==
- 2009 Special Honours (New Zealand)
- List of grand and principal companions of the New Zealand Order of Merit
- Living New Zealand dames and knights
- New Zealand campaign medals
- New Zealand royal honours system
- Orders, decorations, and medals of the Commonwealth realms
- Order of Australia
- Order of Canada
