= Doyen =

Senior ambassador by length of service

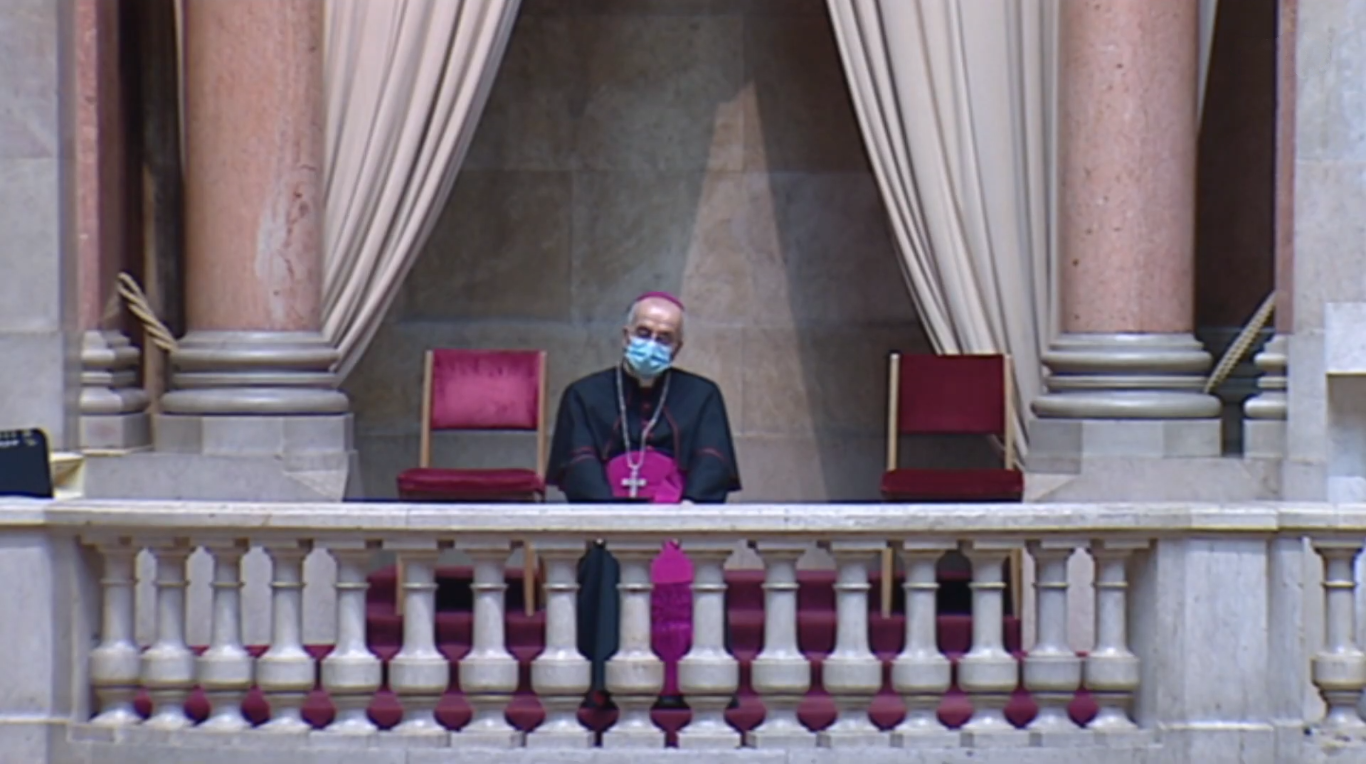
The Apostolic Nuncio Ivo Scapolo, as Doyen, is the single member of the diplomatic corps in attendance at the second inauguration of Marcelo Rebelo de Sousa, President of Portugal, held in March 2021 during the COVID-19 pandemic

A doyen or doyenne (from the French word doyen, doyenne in the feminine grammatical gender) is the senior ambassador by length of service in a particular country.

In the English language, the meaning of doyen (feminine form: doyenne) has been borrowed from French to refer to any senior member of a group, particularly one whose knowledge or abilities exceed those of other members. In the United States and other English-speaking countries, the title of Dean is often used for the seniormost member of the diplomatic corps.

In many Catholic countries, the doyen of the diplomatic corps is the Apostolic Nuncio regardless of the length of service. In a number of former colonies in Africa, the ambassador of the former metropolis holds this position.

In most countries, the longest-serving ambassador to a country is given the title doyen of the Diplomatic Corps. The doyen is often accorded a high position in the order of precedence. In New Zealand, for example, the doyen takes precedence over figures such as the deputy prime minister and former governors-general.

In many countries that have Catholicism as the official or dominant religion, the apostolic nuncio (the diplomatic representative of the Holy See) serves as doyen by virtue of his office, regardless of seniority; in other cases, the nuncio is treated as an ordinary ambassador of the Holy See and has no special precedence. The Congress of Vienna and the Vienna Convention on Diplomatic Relations provided that any country may choose to give nuncios a different precedence than other ambassadors.

The diplomatic corps may also cooperate amongst itself on a number of matters, including certain dealings with the host government. In practical terms, the dean of the diplomatic corps may have a role to play in negotiating with local authorities regarding the application of aspects of the Vienna Convention on Diplomatic Relations and diplomatic immunity, such as the payment of certain fees or taxes, since the receiving country is required "not to discriminate between states". In this sense, the dean has the role of representing the entire diplomatic corps for matters that affect the corps as a whole, although this function is rarely formalized.
