= Cittadini =

Cittadini is a surname. Notable people with the surname include:

- David Cittadini, New Zealander technical innovator
- Léo Cittadini (born 1994), Brazilian footballer
- Lorenzo Cittadini (born 1982), Italian rugby player
- Pierfrancesco Cittadini (1616–1681), Italian baroque period painter
- Tito Cittadini (1886–1960), Argentine painter
