= Les Archives du Cœur =

Art project by Christian Boltanski

Heart Archive
- Les Archives du Cœur
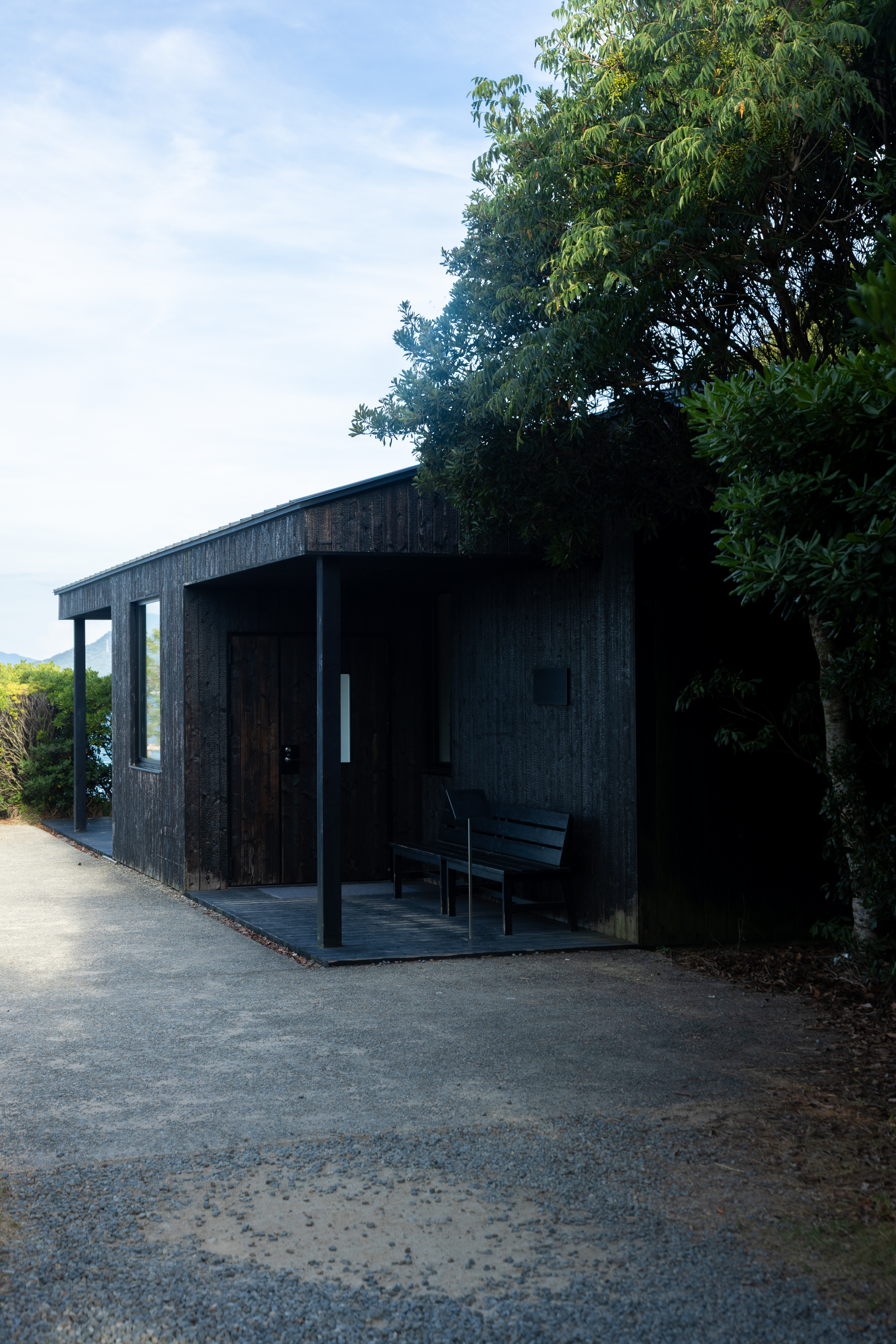
- Entrance to the archive in Teshima, Japan

General information
- Town or city: Teshima
- Country: Japan
- Coordinates: 34.48803857204301°N 134.10310683170033°E

Les Archives du Cœur, or the Heart Archive, is an art project by French artist Christian Boltanski which archives the recorded heartbeats of thousands of people. The archives are permanently housed in a building on Teshima, an island on Japan, while a traveling exhibition has allowed patrons worldwide to record their own heartbeats to be stored.

== Building ==
Unveiled to the public in 2010, the archive is located on a beach in Teshima. Its facility has a recording room, for recording one's heartbeat; a listening room, to listen to anyone's heartbeat, selectable from a computer; and a heart room, which features an installation where a light bulb flickers in lockstep with the pulse of a heartbeat randomly selected from the archive's recordings.

== Exhibitions ==
Several exhibitions across the world have been set up to allow visitors to record a heartbeat in a booth, after which the audio file is sent to the archive in Teshima. Such exhibitions have appeared at the Serpentine Gallery, Jupiter Artland, Es Baluard,and many others.
