= Patsy Reddy =

Governor-General of New Zealand from 2016 to 2021

The Right Honourable Dame Patsy Reddy GNZM CVO QSO DStJ
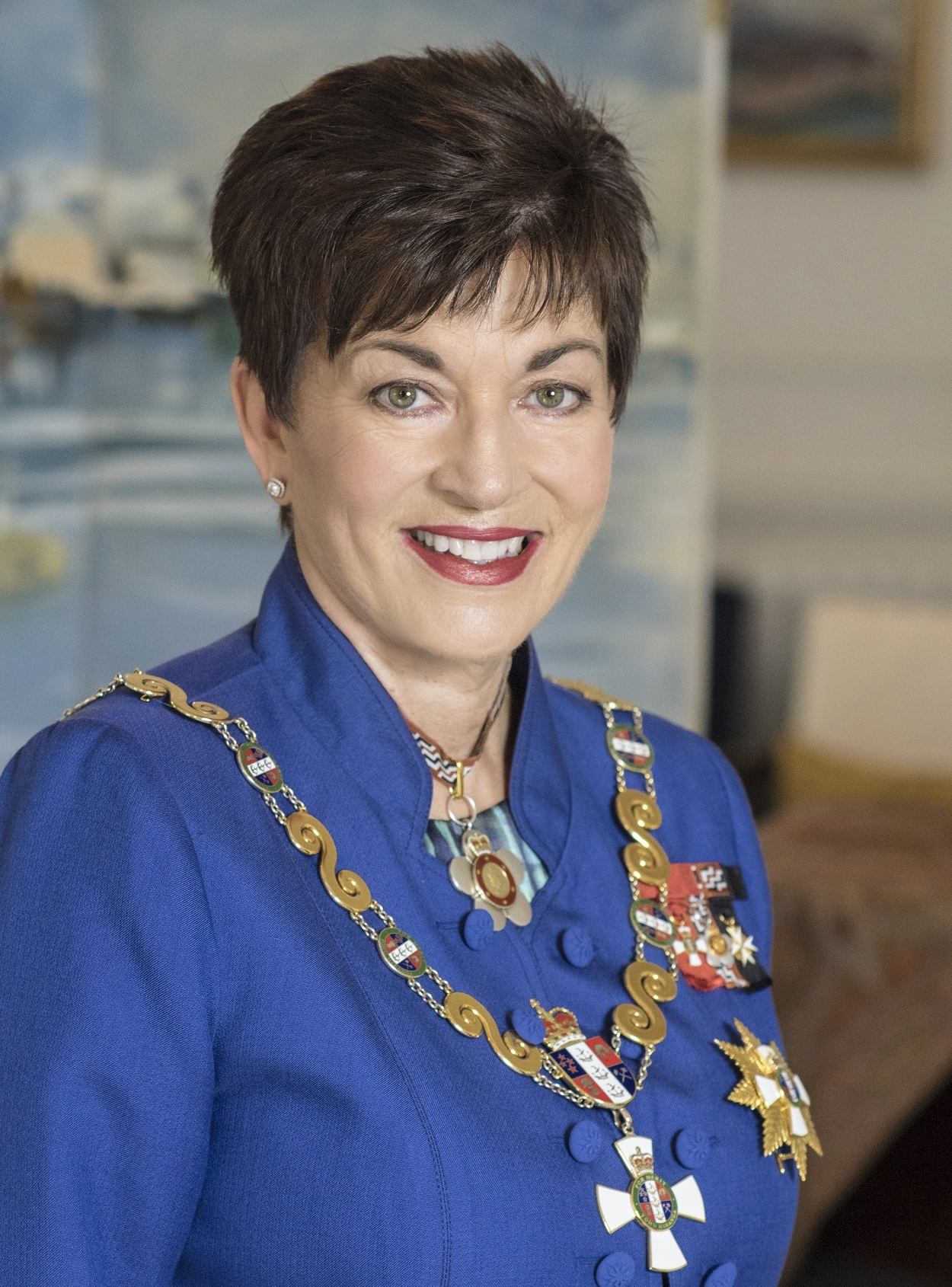
- Official portrait, 2017

21st Governor-General of New Zealand
- In office 28 September 2016 – 28 September 2021
- Monarch: Elizabeth II
- Prime Minister: John Key; Bill English; Jacinda Ardern
- Preceded by: Jerry Mateparae
- Succeeded by: Cindy Kiro

Personal details
- Born: Patricia Lee Reddy; 17 May 1954 (age 72) Matamata, New Zealand
- Spouses: Geoff Harley (div. 1988); David Gascoigne (m. 2016; died 2026)
- Education: Victoria University of Wellington
- Profession: Lawyer

Dame Patricia Lee Reddy (born 17 May 1954) is a New Zealand lawyer and businesswoman who served as the 21st governor-general of New Zealand from 2016 to 2021.

Before becoming governor-general, Reddy was a partner of a law firm, headed a major review of intelligence agencies, held multiple directorships, chaired the New Zealand Film Commission and worked as a chief negotiator on Treaty of Waitangi settlements. Prime Minister John Key advised the Queen to appoint Reddy to succeed Sir Jerry Mateparae as the Queen's representative, and Reddy was sworn in for a five-year term on 28 September 2016.

== Early life and education ==
Born in Matamata, New Zealand, on 17 May 1954, Reddy is the daughter of Neil William and Catherine Marjorie "Kay" Reddy, both of whom were schoolteachers. Three of her ancestors left Ireland and went to Canada, Australia, and New Zealand. A distant cousin, singer Helen Reddy, was descended from the Australian forebear. Reddy was raised in the small Waikato towns of Te Ākau and Minginui until her family moved to Hamilton when she was six years old. There, she attended Hillcrest Primary School, Peachgrove Intermediate School and Hamilton Girls' High School.

Reddy completed tertiary study at Victoria University of Wellington, graduating in 1976 as a Bachelor of Laws and in 1979 as a Master of Laws, with first-class honours.

== Career ==
Reddy was a junior lecturer and then lecturer at Victoria University's faculty of law. In 1982 she joined the Wellington firm Watts and Patterson (now Minter Ellison Rudd Watts), becoming their first female partner in 1983. She specialised in tax, corporate and film law. She later took up a position at Brierley Investments, where she was employed for 11 years, and worked on large acquisition negotiations such as the privatisation of Air New Zealand.

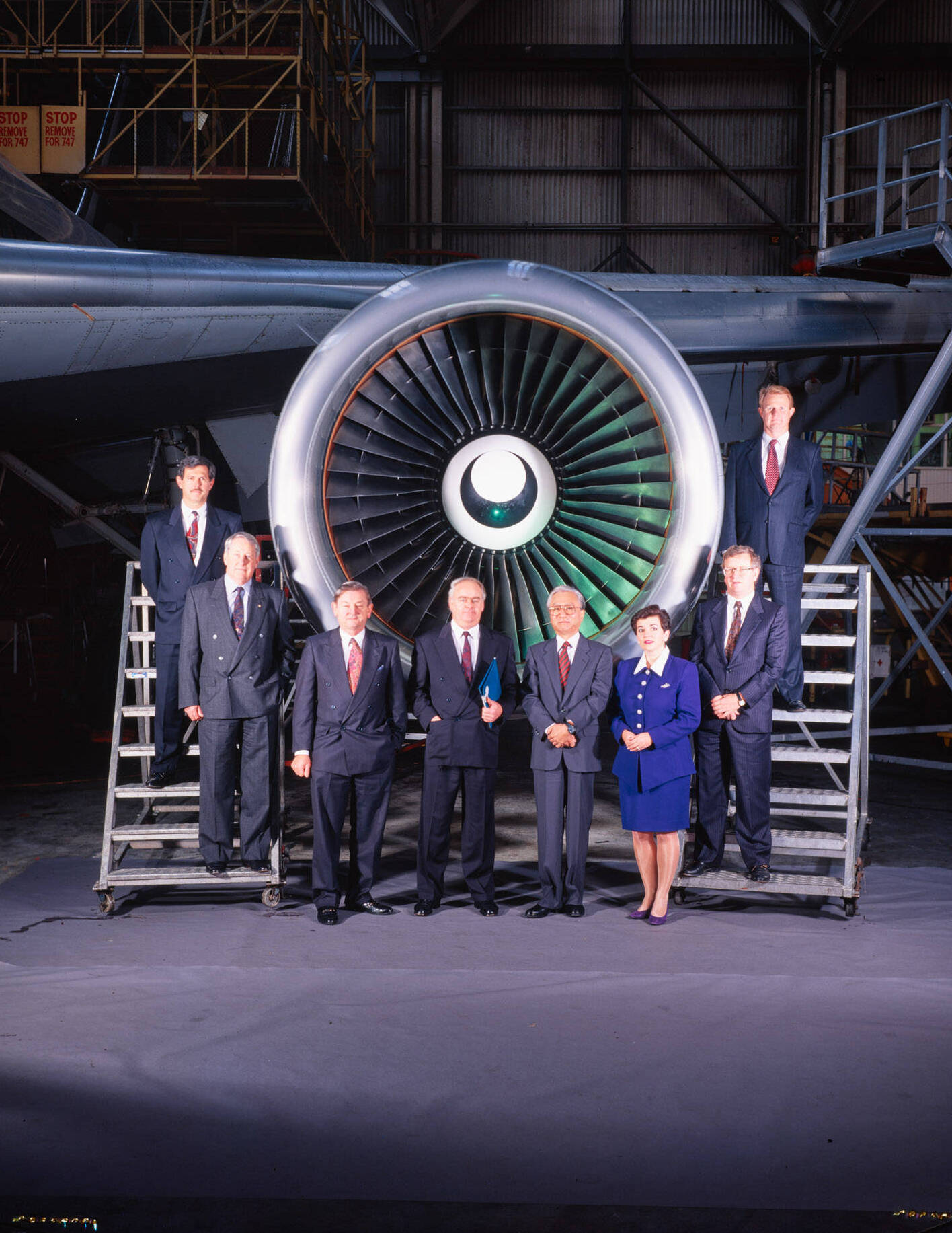
Air New Zealand board after the 1989 privatisation including Reddy

Reddy was on the board of Ansett New Zealand for a few months in early 1988 representing the interests of Brierley Investments, until the New Zealand shareholdings were sold to Ansett Australia. When Air New Zealand was sold in 1989 to a consortium headed by Brierley Investments, Reddy was appointed to the board to represent the interests of Brierley Investments. In 1992, the boards of the ten largest New Zealand companies were analysed, and only two women were among the 89 board members: Reddy on Air New Zealand, and Kerrin Vautier on Fletcher Challenge. Reddy reflected in an interview why so few women were on company boards, and why she predicted this to change to 25% female membership by the end of the century.

Reddy served as chair of the New Zealand Film Commission and Education Payroll Ltd and was a director of Payments NZ Ltd and Active Equity Holdings Ltd. She was a chief Crown negotiator for Treaty of Waitangi settlements and a lead reviewer for the Performance Improvement Framework for the State Services Commission. She was also the deputy chair of the New Zealand Transport Agency. Other directorships included Telecom Corporation of New Zealand Ltd, SKYCITY Entertainment Group, and New Zealand Post.

In 2016, Reddy and Sir Michael Cullen collaborated on an independent report to the New Zealand government reviewing legislation covering the country's intelligence agencies. Their report was released on 9 March 2016, two weeks before Reddy's appointment as governor-general was publicly announced. The report recommended expanding the Government Communications Security Bureau's rights to monitor the personal communications of New Zealanders, and was met with some controversy.

Reddy was also involved in a number of non-governmental organisations, particularly in the arts and gender equality. She was one of the founding members in 2009 of Global Women New Zealand, a group of prominent women who advocate for inclusion and diversity in leadership.

In December 2022, she was elected chair of New Zealand Rugby.

In December 2024 she was appointed to the board of the Malaghan Institute of Medical Research.

On 9 December 2024, Dame Patsy took over as chair of the Climate Change Commission from Rod Carr.

== Governor-General of New Zealand ==
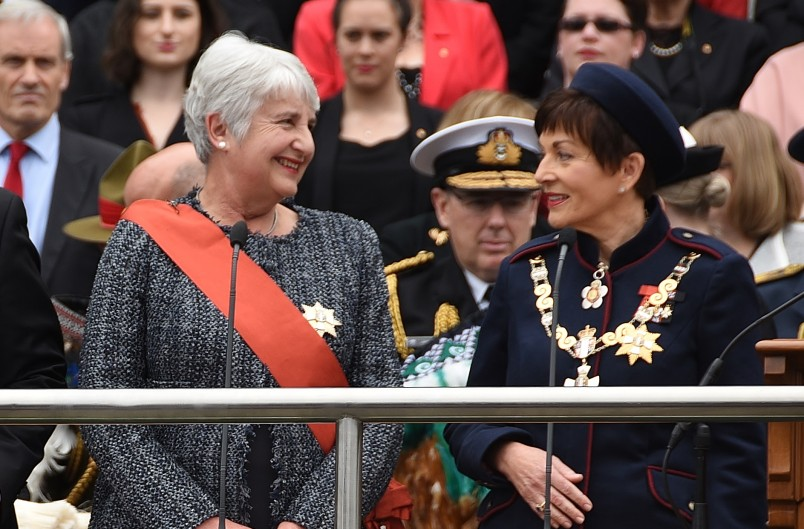
Dame Patsy Reddy (right) with Chief Justice Dame Sian Elias at the swearing-in ceremony, 28 September 2016

In March 2016, it was announced that Queen Elizabeth II had approved the appointment of Reddy as the next governor-general of New Zealand, for a five-year term starting in September 2016, on the advice of then Prime Minister John Key. She was officially sworn in as the 21st governor-general by Chief Justice Sian Elias on 28 September. The swearing-in ceremony included a Māori pōwhiri, a 21-gun salute, and music from the Royal New Zealand Air Force Band and the New Zealand Opera Chorus; the ceremony was attended by hundreds of observers, including film-makers Sir Peter Jackson and James Cameron (a former neighbour), with an address by Prime Minister John Key. Reddy became the third woman to hold the position, after Catherine Tizard and Silvia Cartwright.

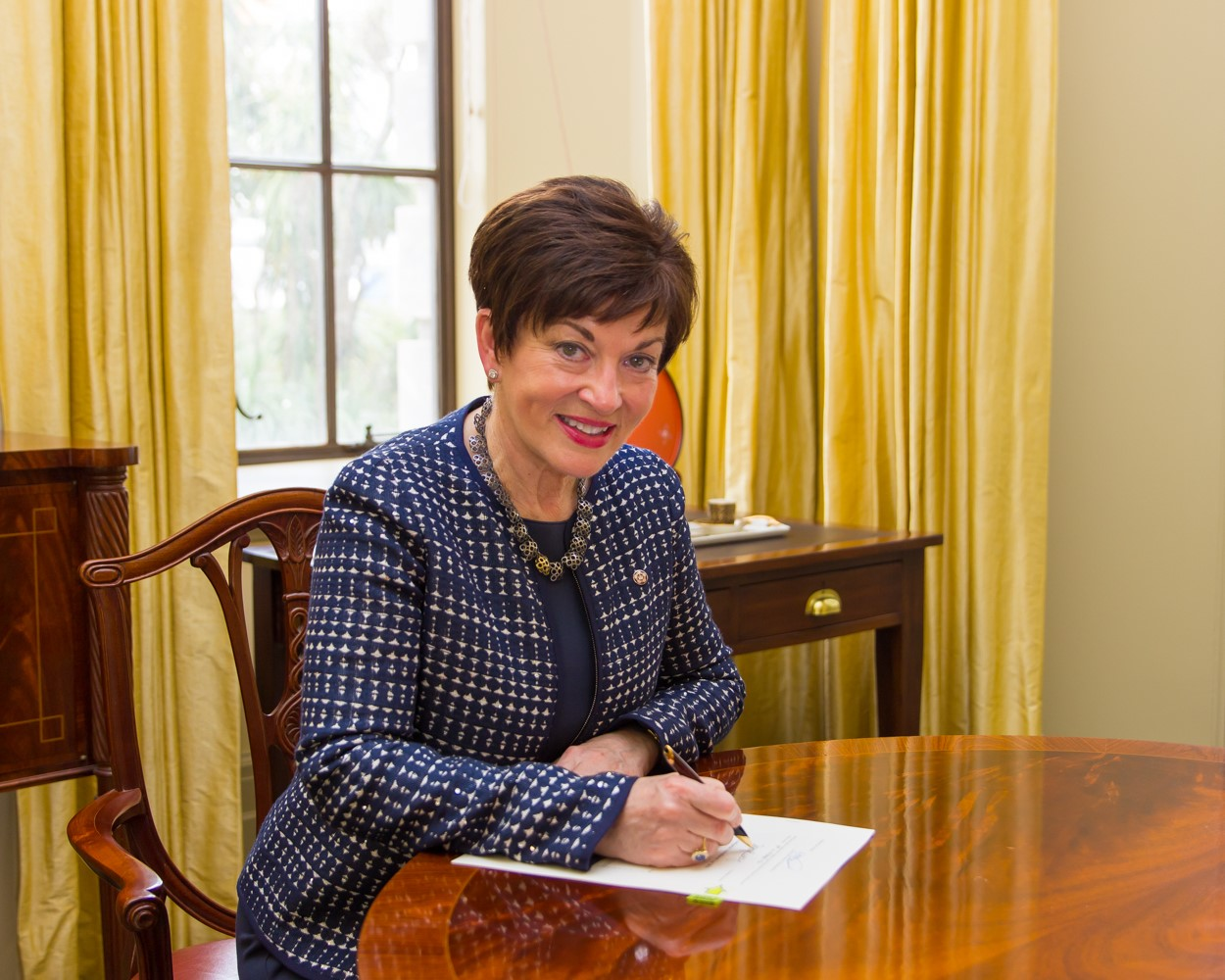
Dame Patsy Reddy gives assent to a bill, 18 October 2016

Reddy gave her first Royal assent as governor-general on 18 October 2016.

On 7 November 2016, Reddy welcomed King Willem-Alexander and Queen Máxima of the Netherlands to New Zealand. She hosted a state banquet.

On 12 December 2016, subsequent to the resignation of John Key, Reddy swore in Bill English as prime minister and Paula Bennett as deputy prime minister.

On 7 February 2017, Reddy delivered her first annual Waitangi Day Bledisloe Address at the Bledisloe Garden reception at Government House, Wellington.

In her first overseas trip, Reddy visited Niue and the Cook Islands, the associated states of New Zealand, on 21 and 22 March 2017 respectively. Reddy was welcomed by Tom Marsters, the Queen's Representative in the Cook Islands.

On 6 May 2017, Reddy travelled to Italy, where she visited various cultural events in Rome and Venice. On 14 May, she visited Barbados, where she met with the Governor-General of Barbados, Sir Elliott Belgrave, and the prime minister, Freundel Stuart.

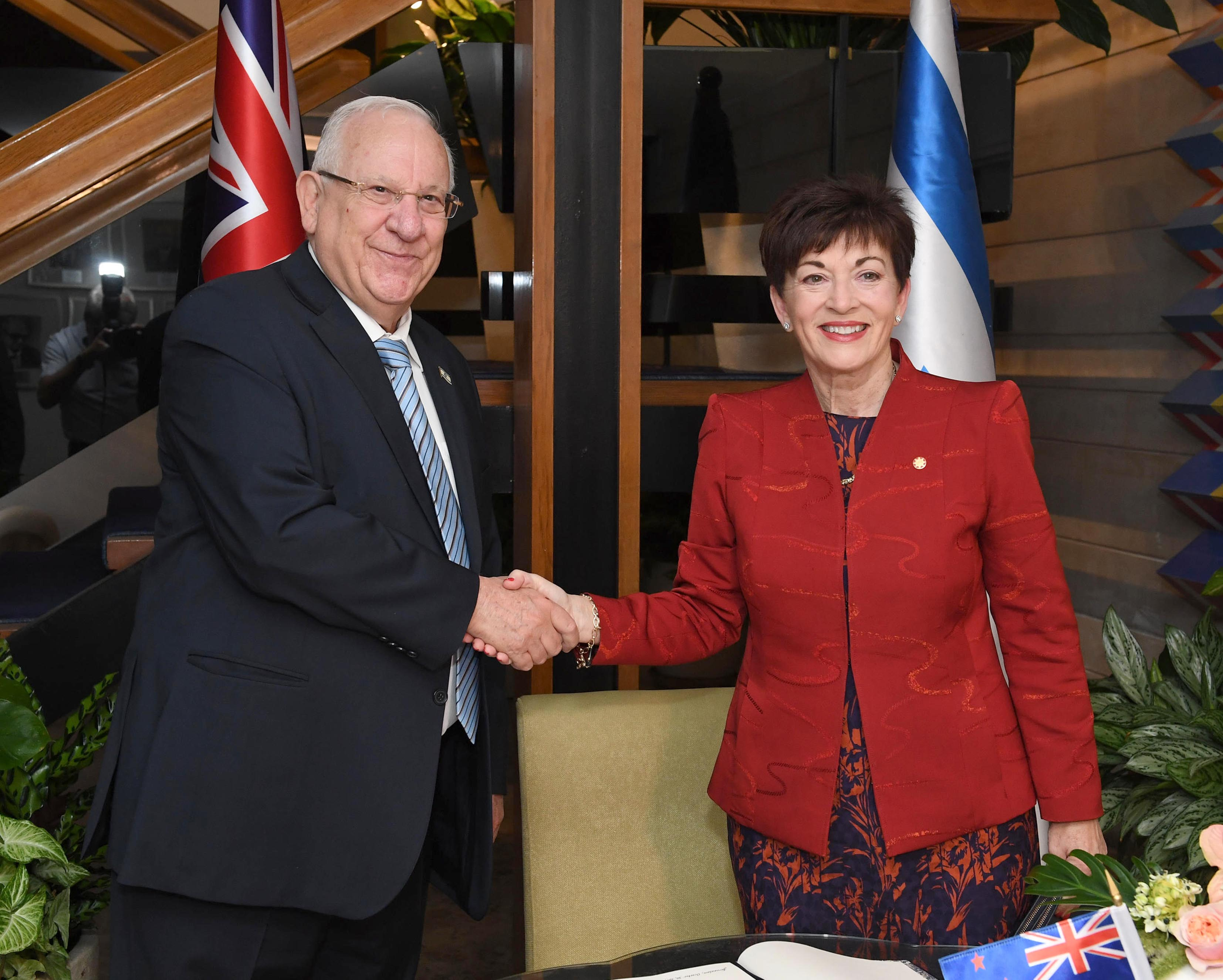
Reddy with Israeli President Reuven Rivlin during a visit to Israel, 27 October 2017

On 30 September 2017, Reddy travelled to Israel for a two-day trip, in which she represented New Zealand at official commemorations to mark the centennial of the Battle of Beersheba during the First World War. She was received by Israeli President Reuven Rivlin and later met with Prime Minister Benjamin Netanyahu.

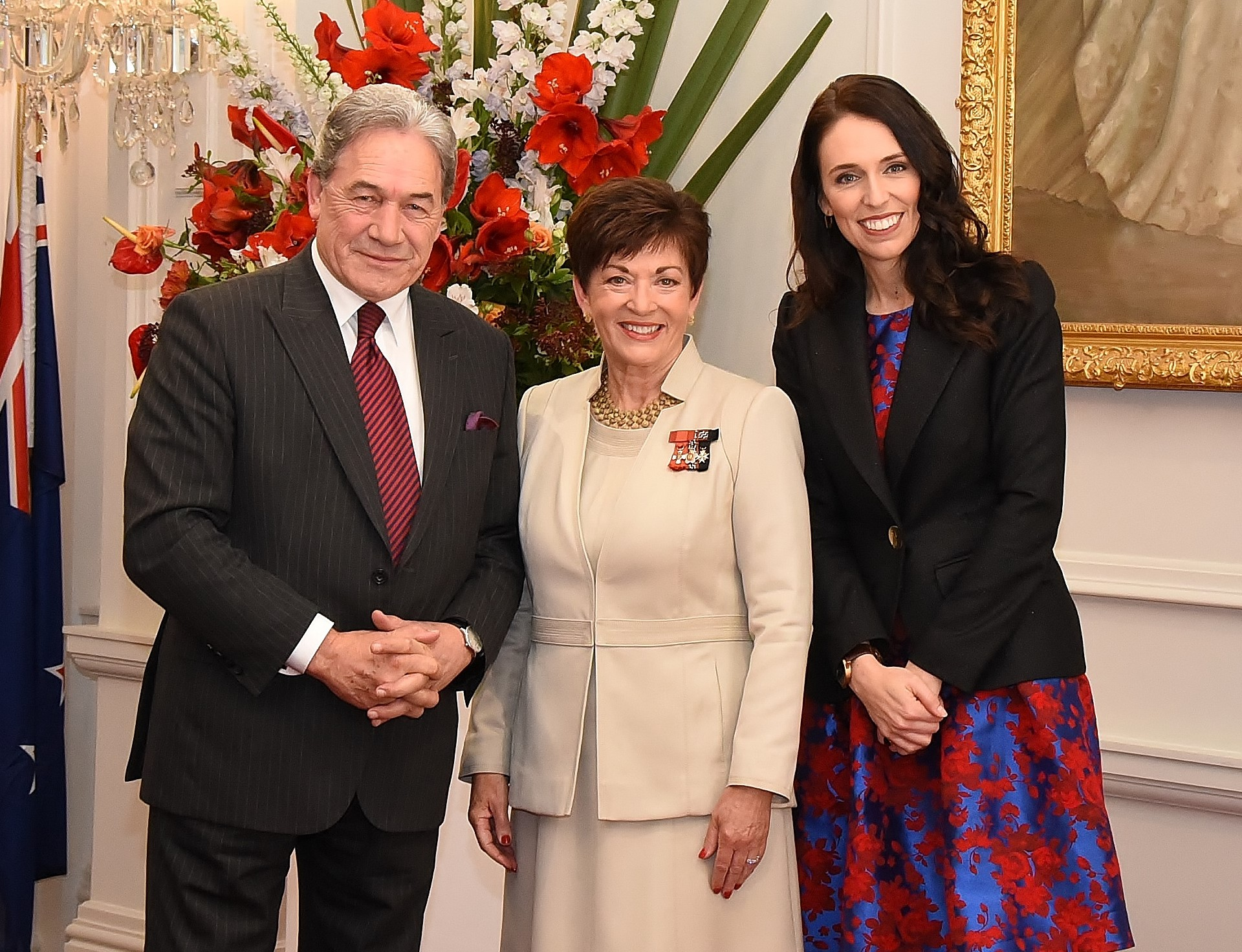
Dame Patsy Reddy with PM Jacinda Ardern and Deputy PM Winston Peters at swearing-in of the Executive Council, 26 October 2017

On 26 October 2017, Reddy presided at the swearing-in of the new Executive Council. She signed warrants appointing the new prime minister, Jacinda Ardern, and other ministers. On 8 November, Reddy attended the State Opening of Parliament where she addressed MPs from the throne.

On 24 October 2017, Reddy hosted a state welcome for the president of Ireland, Michael D. Higgins, at Government House. A couple of weeks later, Reddy hosted German President Frank-Walter Steinmeier at Government House from 5 to 7 November 2017. The visit started with a wreath-laying ceremony at Pukeahu National War Memorial Park.

On 5 December 2017, Reddy began a three-day trip to Malaysia. The state visit marked the sixtieth year of diplomatic relations between New Zealand and Malaysia. Among several engagements, Reddy had an audience with Sultan Muhammad V, and attended a state banquet.

On 1 January 2018, Reddy issued her New Year video message. She focused on gender equality and respect for women; Reddy also noted the 125th anniversary of women's suffrage in New Zealand.

Reddy welcomed former US President Barack Obama to Government House on 22 March 2018. On 23 April, Reddy travelled to Turkey to represent New Zealand at commemorative events associated with the Gallipoli campaign; on 26 April, she met Turkish President Recep Tayyip Erdoğan at the Presidential Palace in Ankara.

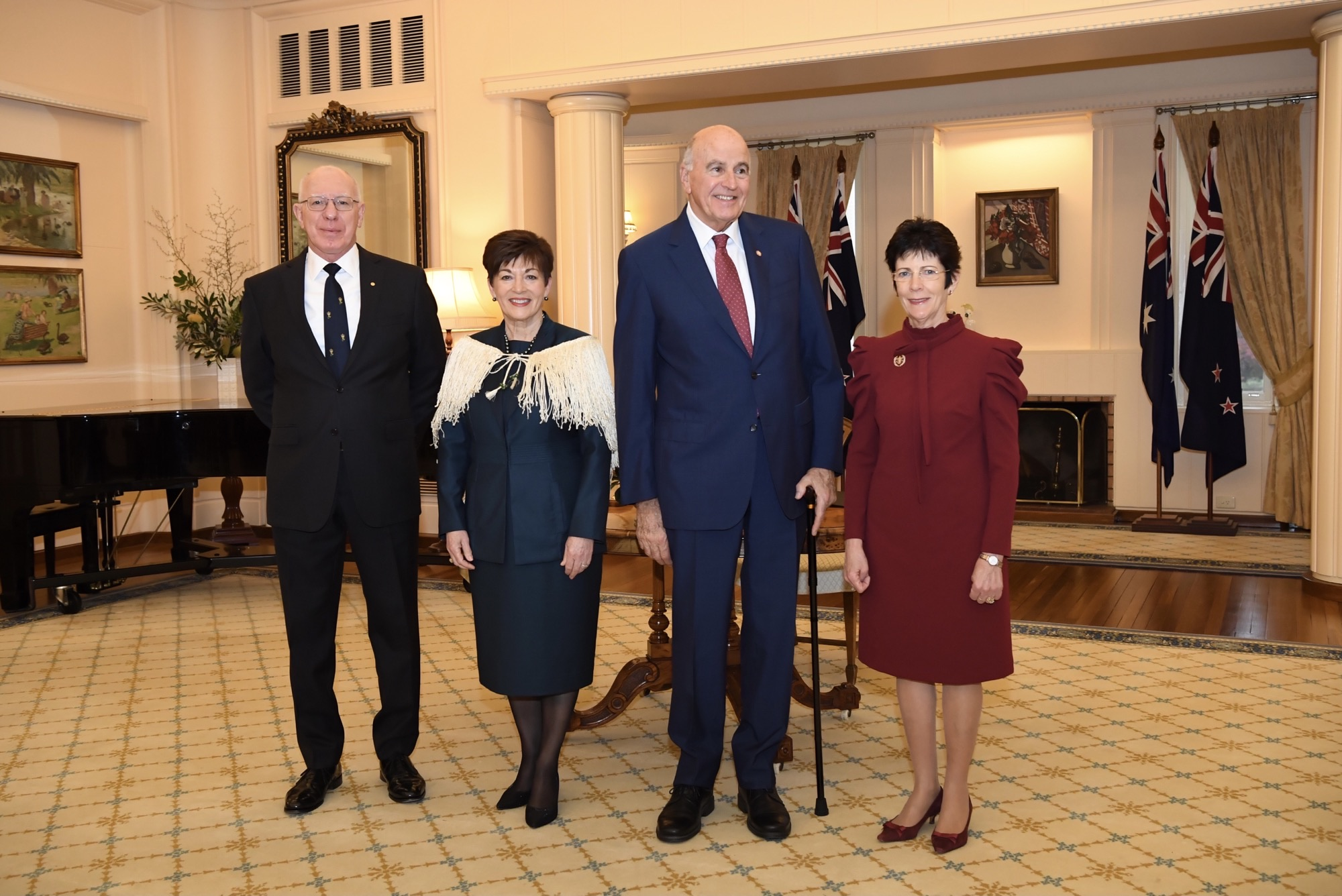
Dame Patsy Reddy and Sir David Gascoigne with Governor-General of Australia David Hurley and Linda Hurley in 2021

On 28 October 2018, Reddy welcomed members of the Royal Family, Prince Harry, Duke of Sussex, and Meghan, Duchess of Sussex, to Wellington. She also hosted a reception at Government House honouring the 125th anniversary of women's suffrage. The following month, on 19 November, Reddy hosted the President of Chile Sebastián Piñera. On 3 December she welcomed the President of the Republic of Korea, Moon Jae-in and his wife Kim Jung-sook to New Zealand during a ceremony at Auckland Government House.

On 15 March 2019, Reddy released a message expressing condolences to the victims of the Christchurch mosque shootings. She remarked "Now more than ever is the time to affirm the values that we hold dear – compassion, kindness and tolerance.".

On 7 June 2019, Reddy represented New Zealand at the commemorations for the 75th anniversary of the D-Day landings at Portsmouth in the United Kingdom.

In October 2019, she visited Japan on an official visit.

Reddy's last overseas visit was to Australia in June 2021. She completed her term as Governor-General of New Zealand on 28 September 2021.

== Personal life ==
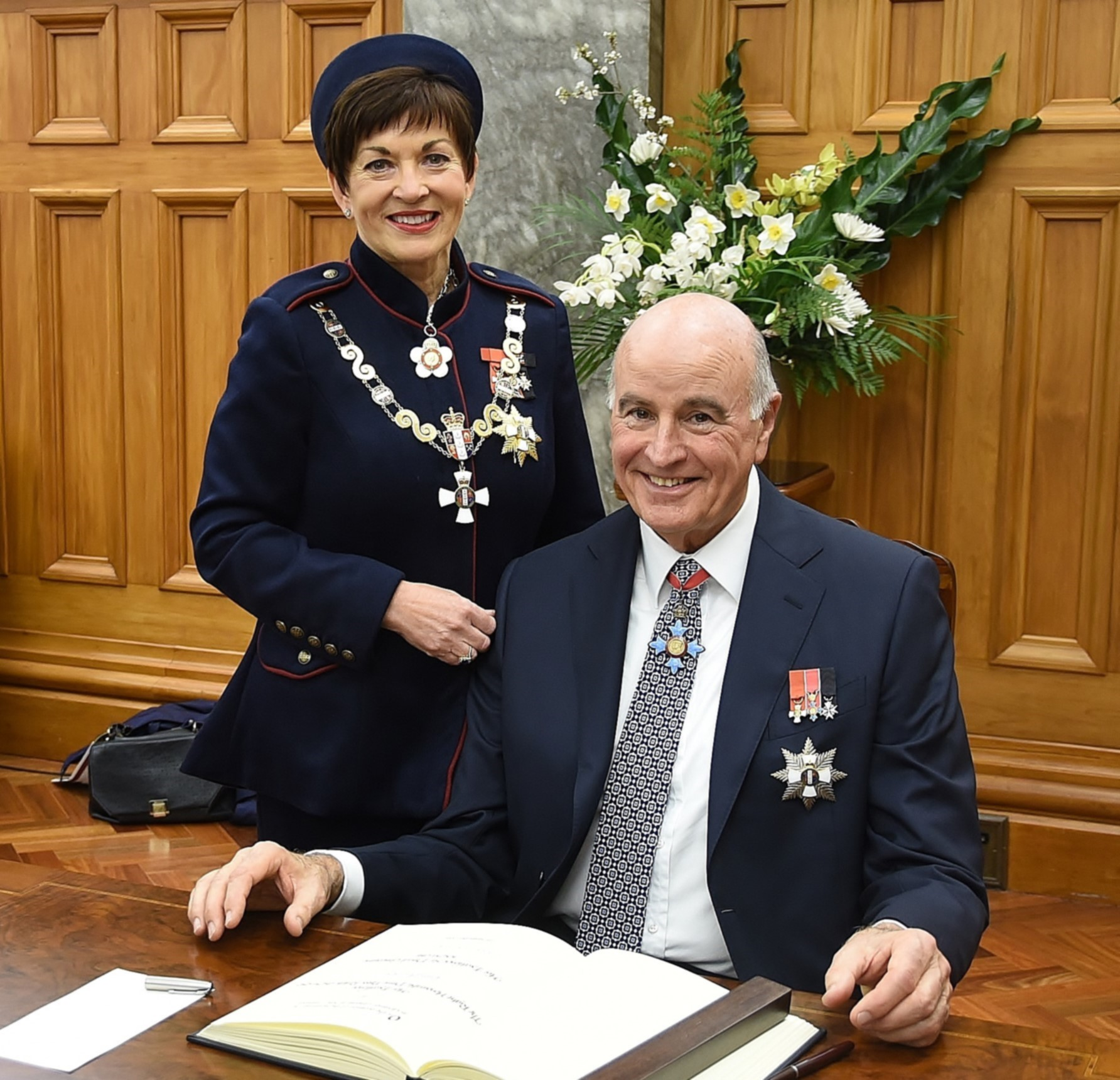
Dame Patsy Reddy and Sir David Gascoigne sign the Visitors' Book at Parliament House, Wellington, 2016

Reddy was married to the former New Zealand Judicial Conduct Commissioner, Sir David Gascoigne, until his death on 26 October 2026. They married one week before her appointment as governor-general was announced. She and her first husband, Geoff Harley, a tax barrister, divorced in 1988. Both husbands were her associates at Rudd Watts & Stone in Wellington in the 1980s.

Reddy is the first vegan governor-general. Accordingly, the banquet at her swearing-in ceremony was entirely vegan.

== Honours and awards ==
Viceregal styles of Dame Patsy Reddy (2016–2021)
- Reference style: Her Excellency the Right Honourable
- Spoken style: Your Excellency

In the 2014 Queen's Birthday Honours, Reddy was appointed a Dame Companion of the New Zealand Order of Merit for services to the arts and business. In June 2016, she was made a Dame of the Most Venerable Order of the Hospital of Saint John of Jerusalem.

Reddy was promoted as an Additional Dame Grand Companion of the New Zealand Order of Merit and appointed an Additional Companion of the Queen's Service Order on 27 June 2016 in preparation for becoming governor-general. As governor-general, Reddy is entitled to be styled "Her Excellency" while in office and "The Right Honourable" for life.

Victoria University of Wellington conferred an honorary Doctor of Laws degree on Reddy on 13 December 2017.

Reddy was appointed Commander of the Royal Victorian Order in the 2022 New Year Honours.

The president of Hungary awarded Reddy the Commander's Cross of the Hungarian Order of Merit in 2022.

== Arms ==
Coat of arms of Patsy Reddy
Notes Patsy Reddy was granted armorial bearings, a badge, and life supporters by the College of Arms on 24 June 2020. Her badge takes the place of a crest because crests are not granted to women. Like a crest, her badge may appear above her shield. The entire achievement consists of: Escutcheon Gules between two Cotises bendwise two Masks bendwise in bend one of Comedy in chief and the other of Tragedy in base the ties hanging inwards those in base overlapping those in chief all between two Pūtōrino [Māori bugle flutes] bendwise Or Supporters On a Compartment Vert on which are red Pōhutukawa Blossom and yellow Kōwhai Flowers slipped and leaved two Tīeke Birds Proper Motto He Toi Whakairo He Mana Tangata ("Where there is artistic excellence there is human dignity") Orders Collar of the New Zealand Order of Merit with Badge appendant; Badge of a Companion of the Queen's Service Order; Badge of a Dame of Justice of the Most Venerable Order of St John of Jerusalem Other elements (And for the Badge) A female Huia proper statant on a Fern Frond curved upwards to the dexter Vert all within a solid Circular Chain charged with four stylised Mānuka Flowers in cross Or. Symbolism The overall design alludes to Reddy's interest in the arts which she shares with her husband. For the arms, the colour red is a play on the surname Reddy. Gold alludes to achievement. It may also allude to constancy and wisdom. The cotises (narrow bendlets either side of the bend) alludes to film and the film industry. The cotises may also allude to the position of the sash of a Dame Grand Companion of the New Zealand Order of Merit (GNZM) when worn over the right shoulder. The two theatrical Masks (comedy and tragedy) represent the performing and visual arts, in particular opera and music. For the badge, the gold chain and stylised mānuka flowers allude to the Principal Companion's badge of the Queen's Service Order.

== See also ==
- List of female representatives of heads of state

Government offices
Preceded by Sir Jerry Mateparae	Governor-General of New Zealand; 2016–2021	Succeeded by Dame Cindy Kiro
