= Francis Small (engineer) =

New Zealand engineer (1946–2021)

Francis Small CNZM
- Born: Arthur Francis Small; 26 February 1946; Palmerston North, New Zealand
- Died: 5 March 2021 (aged 75); Wellington, New Zealand
- Education: University of Auckland
- Scientific career
- Thesis: Hydroelastic excitation of cylinders (1971)
- Doctoral advisor: Arved Raudkivi

82nd President of IPENZ
- In office 1996–1997
- Preceded by: Douglas Armstrong
- Succeeded by: John Philip Blakeley

National president of Scouting New Zealand

Arthur Francis Small CNZM (26 February 1946 – 5 March 2021) was a New Zealand engineer and scouting leader. He served as the national president of Scouting New Zealand, as well as the vice-chairman of the Asia-Pacific Regional Scout Committee.

== Early life ==
Small was born in 1946, He studied civil engineering at the University of Auckland, completing a Master of Engineering degree in 1969, and a PhD in 1971. His doctoral thesis, supervised by Arved Raudkivi, was titled Hydroelastic excitation of cylinders.

== Career ==
Joining the New Zealand Railways Department in 1964, Small rose to become managing director of New Zealand Rail in 1990 and its successor, Tranz Rail. He retired from Tranz Rail in 2000 and was replaced, as managing director, by Michael Beard in May of that year. Small was then vice-chairman for some time. For his services to the transport industry and the community, he was appointed a Companion of the New Zealand Order of Merit in the 2000 New Year Honours.

In 1999, Small was appointed by the National Government as one of three people on the high-profile INCIS inquiry into the failed computer system that had been ordered by New Zealand Police in the 1990s. Early in 2000 after a change to the Labour Government, the other two members were dispensed with and Small conducted the enquiry by himself. Small's report on INCIS was published in November 2000.

Small was a Distinguished Fellow of the Institution of Professional Engineers New Zealand (IPENZ) and was the group's president in 1996–97. In 2013, he received an individual award from the Railway Technical Society of Australasia for outstanding service to New Zealand's rail industry. In 2015, he founded the Francis Small Scholarship at the University of Auckland, available to civil, electrical, mechanical or chemical engineering students.

In 1999, Small was awarded the 278th Bronze Wolf, the only distinction of the World Organization of the Scout Movement, awarded by the World Scout Committee for exceptional services to world scouting.

Small died in Wellington on 5 March 2021.
