= Kerrin Vautier =

New Zealand economist

Kerrin Margaret Vautier, CMG, was born in 1945 and is a New Zealand economist specialising in competition law and economics. She was appointed as deputy chair of the Reserve Bank of New Zealand (RBNZ) in 2016.

== Biography ==
Vautier graduated with a Bachelor of Arts (economics major) from Victoria University of Wellington in 1965, before beginning work at the New Zealand Institute of Economic Research (NZIER).

After relocating to Auckland in 1975 she began a consultancy business, and became a lecturer in the departments of Business Administration and Commercial Law at the University of Auckland.

=== Governance ===
Vautier has held governance positions across a diverse range of sectors, and in 1992, along with Dame Patsy Reddy, was one of only two women serving as directors in New Zealand's ten largest companies.

Her governance roles include:

- Appointment to the board of Marac Holdings Ltd. in May 1985. At the time, the Press reported that Vautier was the first woman serving on the board of a major public financial services group.
- Member of the New Zealand Commerce Commission until her term expired on July 14 1990.
- Board member of grocery company Progressive Enterprises Ltd., now Woolworths.
- Appointed as chair of the board of the New Zealand Institute of Economic Research in November 1992.
- Appointed as Board member of Norwich Union Holdings (NZ) Ltd., State Insurance Ltd., Norwich Union Life Insurance (NZ) Ltd., and subsidiaries in March 1994.
- Foundation member of the board of the Asia 2000 Foundation of New Zealand until 2001.
- Chair of the New Zealand Committee of the Pacific Economic Cooperation Council.
- Board Chair for Chamber Music New Zealand (CBNZ).
- Appointment as Chair of the advisory board of the New Zealand Asia Institute in 2002.

==== Fletcher Challenge ====
In December 1985 Vautier was the first woman to be appointed to the Fletcher Challenge board. She was also the first new director since the company was formed in 1981, and the second youngest member of the board after managing director Hugh Fletcher.

In this capacity she helped to oversee the creation and development of Fletcher Building, making a significant contribution to the growth of the company. She retired from the Fletcher Building Board in August 2011.

==== New Zealand Association of Economists ====
Vautier was heavily involved with the New Zealand Association of Economists (NZAE), acting as Business Manager for the journal New Zealand Economic Papers (1969-1976), serving on the NZAE Council (1973-1981), and acting as Vice-President (1975-1976) then President (1977-1978). During this time she was one of only two women active in the NZAE, and played a key role in hosting the Pacific Trade and Development Conference (PAFTAD) while acting as President. In 2004 the NZAE awarded her Life Membership of the association.

=== Awards ===
In the 1993 Queen's Birthday Honours, Vautier was appointed a Companion of Order of Saint Michael and Saint George for services to economics and business management.

In 1983, Vautier was voted 'Woman of the Year' by the Auckland Plunket Society.

=== Personal life ===
Vautier was a violinist in the National Youth Orchestra of New Zealand for five years.

In 2022, Vautier self-published a book titled The Music Plays On, which tells the story of her grandparents, Archibald and Mary-Ellen Christie, who lived in Gore during the late 19th and early 20th centuries. Copies of the book are held by the Gore District Library and the heritage department at Gore District Council.

== Publications ==
- Vautier, K. M. (1998). Competition principles for APEC economies. New Zealand: APEC Study Centre, New Zealand Asia Institute.
- Vautier, K. M., Farmer, J. A., & Baxt, R. (1990). CER and business competition: Australia and New Zealand in a global economy. Auckland: Commerce Clearing House N.Z. Ltd.
