= Es Baluard =

Art museum in Palma, Spain

Coordinates: 39°34′15″N 2°38′30″E

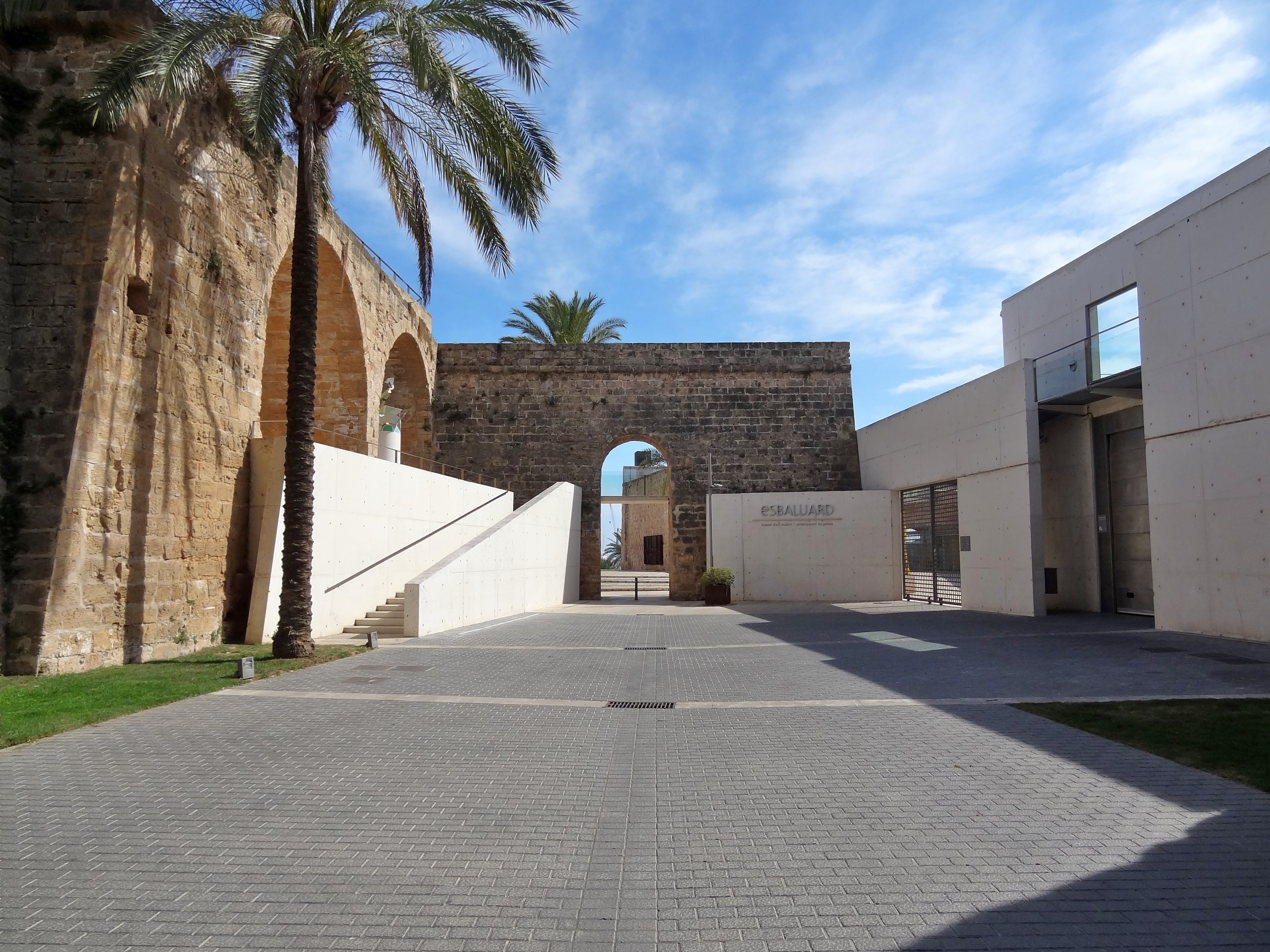
- Established: 30 January 2004
- Location: Porta de Santa Catalina, 10; Palma, Mallorca, Spain
- Public transit access: City Bus 1, 2, 3, 5, 7 and 46; Tourist bus 50
- Website: www.esbaluard.org

Es Baluard Museu d’Art Modern i Contemporani de Palma, located in Palma and inaugurated on 30 January 2004, has a reserve of more than 700 works of art linked to artists from the Balearic Islands and/or of international renown.

As well as conserving and publicising its collection, Es Baluard runs a programme of temporary exhibitions, cultural activities and educational and training cycles. The main artists and movements related to the Balearic Islands form a body which took shape after the initial presentation of the collection which was made in the year the museum opened. Since then, the original nucleus of the museum’s reserves – made up of donations and the deposit of works by the Art Serra Foundation (Fundació d’Art Serra), as well as works deposited by Palma City Council (Ajuntament de Palma), the Council of Mallorca (Consell de Mallorca) and the Government of the Balearic Islands (Govern de les Illes Balears) – has been added to as a result of the introduction of further works that have been acquired, donated and temporarily ceded by artists, collectors and entities.

== Location ==
The main building was designed in 2003 by Lluís García-Ruiz, Jaume García-Ruiz, Vicente Tomás and Angel Sánchez Cantalejo. It has a total surface area of 5,027 m², of which 2,500 are used as exhibition spaces. It is divided into three storeys which are connected to the outside, to the city walls and to each other by means of ramps, skylights and large interior balconies, in an attempt to reflect an indoor street concept.

== The collection ==
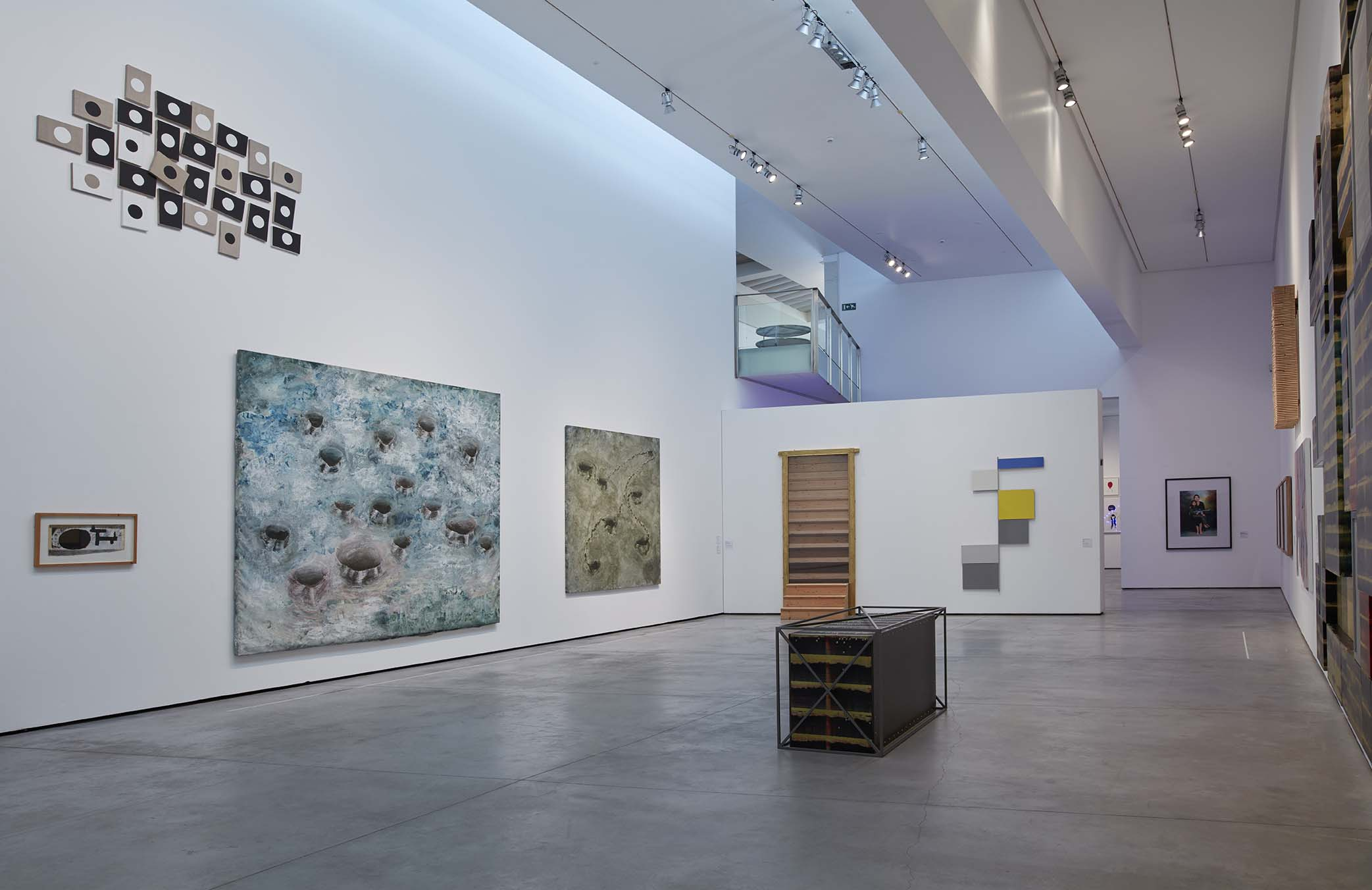
Museum Permanent Collection

The Collection of Es Baluard Museu d’Art Modern i Contemporani de Palma includes works of art by the most significant artists and movements that have converged in the past and continue to converge in the Balearic Islands, from the late 19th century to the present.

It begins with the works of pictorial modernism and the renovation of the landscape genre in Spain, showcasing the importance of Mallorca in its development. Joaquim Mir, Santiago Rusiñol, Hermen Anglada-Camarasa, Joaquín Sorolla, Antoni Gelabert and Tito Cittadini are some of the key artists from this period, placed between the late 19th century and the 1930s; alongside them are two female creators, Pilar Montaner de Sureda and Norah Borges, who were associated to the artistic and literary trends of the day.

The early years of the 20th century, meanwhile, bear witness to the emergence in Europe of the different avant-garde movements which rebelled against the hegemony of western figurative art, a state of cultural crisis that was heightened after World War One and which would continue in the 1940s and ‘50s, advocating a questioning of the artistic object. The artists represented include María Blanchard, Wifredo Lam, Fernand Léger, André Masson, Roberto Matta, Joan Miró, Robert Motherwell, Jorge Oteiza, Picasso, Juli Ramis and Antoni Tàpies, among others.

New figuration, pop, minimalism or conceptual art are just some of the tendencies that arose from the ‘sixties onwards, a period in which social and cultural ensued and which would later be called “postmodernism”. Erwin Bechtold, Joan Brossa, Erró, Juan Genovés, Hans Hartung, Rebecca Horn, Antoni Miralda, Pablo Palazuelo, Antonio Saura and Rafael Tur Costa, for example, precede the new generation of recognised painters: Miquel Barceló, José Manuel Broto, Miguel Ángel Campano, Maria Carbonero, Ramon Canet, Luis Gordillo, Anselm Kiefer and Juan Uslé. A wide diversity of languages shapes today’s artistic panorama, with creators such as Lida Abdul, Marina Abramović, Pilar Albarracín, Christian Boltanski, Daniel Canogar, Toni Catany, Ñaco Fabré, Mónica Fuster, Alberto García-Alix, Núria Marqués, Jorge Mayet, Joan Morey, Michael Najjar, Marina Núñez, Bernardí Roig, Francisco Ruiz de Infante, Amparo Sard, Antoni Socías and Nicholas Woods as examples of this evolution of contemporary artistic practice.
