= INCIS =

Integrated National Crime Information System

INCIS was the name of the Integrated National Crime Information System designed to provide information to the New Zealand Police in the 1990s, but which was abandoned in 1999. Although the project was abandoned parts of its hardware and software infrastructure are still in use today.

== Origins and history ==
INCIS was an ambitious project with origins dating back to project Serious Incident Computer Application (SICA) in April 1985, and the National Intelligence System (NIS) project in January 1991. The aim of INCIS was to support operational policing in New Zealand by providing improved information, investigation and analysis capabilities. The belief was that ultimately crime prevention strategies would minimise the incidence and effects of crime on the community. The New Zealand Police developed the INCIS Business Case, which was presented to government in July 1993. The project had a large information technology component. Its prime contractor was IBM, who were to deliver technical infrastructure and 3500 desktop computers. Originally the intended desktop was OS/2 but later was revised to use Windows NT.

== Project Team ==
The INCIS Project Team went through many changes throughout its life. In 1991 the initial team consisted of senior New Zealand Police personnel plus Martyn Carr (Project Manager) and David Cittadini (Technology Architect), then senior consultants with Price Waterhouse New Zealand. This team completed an initial review of INCIS and lead the project through the initial Scoping Study, the Business Case, the Request for Information (RFI), Request for Tender (RFT) and initial Business Plan stages. This team lead the project up to the point before IBM was selected as the prime contractor. During this time Martyn Carr and David Cittadini left Price Waterhouse to form their own technology advisory company, called Sapphire Technology Limited (Sapphire). In August 1994 Sapphire ceased to be engaged by the Police and Martyn Carr ceased to be Project Manager and David Cittadini ceased to be the Technology Architect. This action was taken so that uniformed police personnel could lead all major aspects of the project; this was seen to be very important by police senior management. This major change in key Project Team personnel took place before IBM was selected as the Prime Contractor. Sapphire provided a "warts and all" report detailing a number of significant business and technical risks with the INCIS project and recommended that these must be resolved before Police committed to IBM and to the future of the INCIS Project. The Police Sponsor decided that these could be overcome during the project itself and the contract with IBM was duly signed in September 1994. By this time Police Superintendent Tony Crewdson was now Project Manager for the project. From this date onwards the INCIS Project Team continued to evolve and change considerably over the life of the project.

== High risk project ==
At the time of inception, INCIS was a high risk project. Visits by managerial police staff to other law enforcement agencies, and other independent research over an extensive period, confirmed the view that the technology requirements for INCIS at that time had not been designed or implemented as an integrated system of sufficient standard to meet the needs of police, anywhere in the world.

== Project cost ==
Excluding internal police costs within the INCIS project, the business case forecast expenditure for Infrastructure, applications and data conversion was NZD$84,860,000. By 31 March 1999, this had increased to NZD$94,710,000. The estimated total cost of the project is NZD$110,000,000.

== Ministerial inquiry ==
An independent ministerial inquiry into INCIS, conducted by Dr Francis Small for the Minister of Justice, was completed in November 2000. It was commissioned by the government so that experience gained from the project could be published and used for the benefit of government agencies to successfully manage information technology projects in the future.

=== Relationship with prime contractor (IBM) ===
The ministerial inquiry communicated to, and invited IBM to meet with the investigative team to supply information in accordance with the inquiry. IBM elected to decline this invitation to meet with the ministerial inquiry. A final draft of the ministerial report was sent to IBM in order to adhere to the laws of natural justice. The following quote is IBM's written response after receiving the final draft report.

Thank you for your letter of 28 July 2000 and the opportunity to respond to the draft report of the Ministerial Inquiry into INCIS.

IBM has consistently taken the view that as the Ministerial Inquiry relates to the relationship between public agencies an active involvement would be inappropriate. Therefore, although IBM believes that a number of the assertions in the draft report which relate to IBM inevitably lack balance, it does not wish to become substantively involved at this stage. IBM therefore declines the opportunity to comment on the contents of the draft report.

== Future projects ==
To date, the New Zealand government has not funded any software engineering project as large as INCIS. The State Services Commission now monitors any information technology project involving capital investment of seven million dollars or more in any one year as a result of the ministerial inquiry.

== See also ==
- National Law Enforcement System
- Novopay (Education Department payroll software)
