= Peachgrove Intermediate =

Location
- Peachgrove Road, Hamilton, New Zealand; Hamilton, New Zealand; 37.7844°S 175.2994°E

Information
- Type: State Co-educational Intermediate
- Motto: Tuatahi, kia marama ki te manaaki (First Learn To Serve)
- Founded: 1957
- Ministry of Education Institution no.: 1892
- Principal: Aaron West
- Years offered: 7-8
- Socio-economic decile: 5 (10 is highest)
- Website: www.peachgrove.school.nz

Peachgrove Intermediate School is a school in Hamilton, New Zealand. It caters for a diverse range of students, mostly from the Hamilton East/Fairfield community. The roll fluctuates between 500-700 students from year to year.

Aaron West is the principal, supported by Helen Te Kiri, deputy principal, and Davina Parangi-Brown, assistant principal. The school is divided into four mountain group syndicates: Kakepuku, Maungatautari, Pirongia, and Karioi, all of which are local maunga (Te Reo/Maori language for 'mountain').

== History ==
The school was opened to pupils in February 1957. Initially the school was incomplete, with the main hall to be completed and all of the playing fields to be laid. In addition to the usual academic subjects, (English, Maths, Social Studies etc.) the school had fully equipped workshops for home economics (cooking) and woodwork (boys only). 2007 saw Peachgrove celebrate its 50th jubilee, which was well attended by many of the early pupils.

== Academic ==
Peachgrove provides a diverse programme, including a bi-lingual unit which teaches te reo Maori, Gifted and Talented and standard classrooms. Peachgrove provides specialist technology, music and arts programmes.

== Sport ==
Peachgrove teams won in local competitions for rugby, soccer, hockey, and basketball. Students enjoy annual opportunities for international travel to such destinations as Fiji, Rarotonga, New Caledonia, and Japan.

== Notable alumni ==
- Dame Patsy Reddy, lawyer and Governor-General
