= Monument to the Lycée Chases =

Installation art by Christian Boltanski

- Artist: Christian Boltanski
- Year: 1989
- Medium: gelatin silver prints, electric cables, and light bulbs
- Dimensions: 118 ⅛ in x 78 ¾ in (300.04 cm x 200.02 cm);118 ⅛ in x 78 ¾ in (300.04 cm x 200.02 cm)
- Location: University of Michigan Museum of Art, Ann Arbor, Michigan

Monument to the Lycée Chases is a 1989 installation piece by French artist Christian Boltanski. In 2006, it was purchased by the University of Michigan Museum of Art.

== Creation ==
Boltanski first drew the piece out on paper, using pencil, colored pencil, and ink on graph paper mounted on board. That sketch, created 1987–1989, is owned by the Museum of Modern Art.

== Description ==
The piece consists of three large gelatin silver prints, which are portraits of adolescents. Around them are eight smaller gelatin prints, as well as 64 lightbulbs. The wiring for the lightbulbs is draped across the photos haphazardly.

The piece was inspired by a found photo of the 1931 graduating class from a private Jewish school in Vienna, Austria. Kay Larson, writing for New York Magazine in 1989, said, "The knowledge that these children were real, that they may still be walking among us unrecognized and adult–unless they all died in the concentration camps–moves Boltanski out of solipsism."
