= Christian Boltanski =

French sculptor and artist (1944–2021)

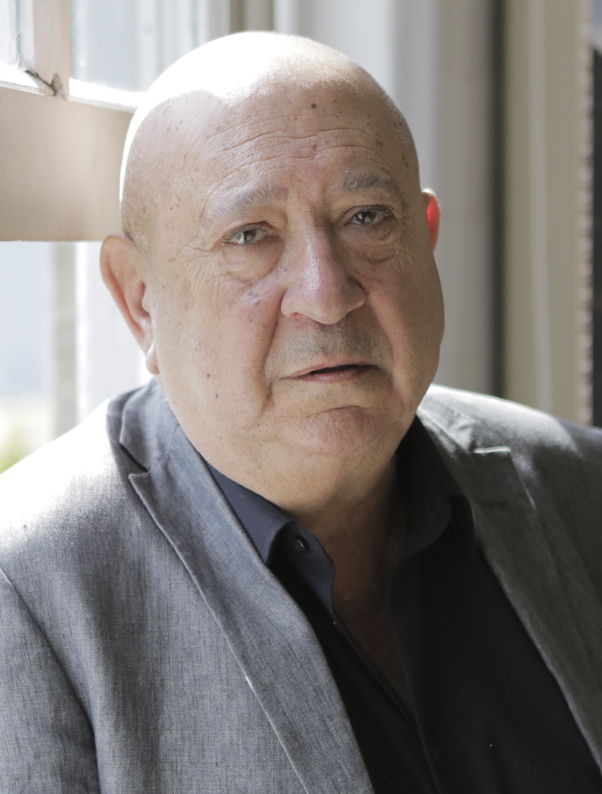
- Boltanski in 2016
- Born: Christian Liberté Boltanski; 6 September 1944; Paris, France
- Died: 14 July 2021 (aged 76); Paris, France
- Known for: Sculpture, painting, photography, installation art
- Movement: Conceptual art

Christian Liberté Boltanski (6 September 1944 – 14 July 2021) was a French sculptor, photographer, painter, and film maker. He is best known for his photography installations and contemporary French conceptual style.

== Early life ==
Boltanski was born in Paris on 6 September 1944. His father, Étienne Alexandre Boltanski, a physician, was Jewish and had come to France from Russia, while Marie-Elise Ilari-Guérin, his Roman Catholic mother originated from Corsica, descended from Ukrainian Jews. His Jewish heritage was a large influence in Boltanski's household. During World War II, while living in Paris, his father escaped deportation by hiding in a space under the floorboards of the family apartment for a year and a half. Christian grew up with this knowledge, and his early experiences with wartime affairs deeply affected him. These experiences would influence his artwork later on. He dropped out of school at age 12.

== Early career ==
Boltanski began creating art in the late 1950s, but did not rise to prominence until almost a decade later through a few short, avant-garde films and some published notebooks in which he referenced his childhood. He had his first one-man exhibition at the Théâtre Le Ranelagh in May 1968. His earliest works included imagery of ideal families and imaginary lifestyles (something Boltanski always lacked), made to display as if they were in museums.

== Installation art ==
Le Lycée Chases (1986-1987) at the Rubell Museum DC in 2022

Boltanski began creating mixed media/materials installations in 1986 with light as essential concept. Tin boxes, altar-like construction of framed and manipulated photographs (e.g. Le Lycée Chases, 1986–1987), photographs of Jewish schoolchildren taken in Vienna in 1931, used as a forceful reminder of mass murder of Jews by the Nazis, all those elements and materials used in his work are used in order to represent deep contemplation regarding reconstruction of past. While creating Reserve (exhibition at Museum für Gegenwartskunst in Basel in 1989), Boltanski filled rooms and corridors with worn clothing items as a way of inciting profound sensation of human tragedy at concentration camps. As in his previous works, objects serve as relentless reminders of human experience and suffering. His piece, Monument (Odessa), uses six photographs of Jewish students in 1939 and lights to resemble Yahrzeit candles to honor and remember the dead. "My work is about the fact of dying, but it's not about the Holocaust itself." In 1971 Boltanski produced his installation, L' Album de la famille D. 1939-1964.

Additionally, his installation titled "No Man's Land" (2010) at the Park Avenue Armory in New York City, is an example of how his constructions and installations trace the lives of the lost and forgotten. Also in 2010, Boltanski unveiled the Les Archives du Cœur on Teshima, an island in Japan, which has since recorded and archived the heartbeats of many visitors.

== Exhibitions ==
Boltanski participated in over 150 art exhibitions throughout the world. Among others, he had solo exhibitions at the New Museum (1988), the Kunstmuseum Liechtenstein, Magasin 3 in Stockholm, the La Maison Rouge gallery, Institut Mathildenhöhe, the Kewenig Galerie, The Musée d'Art et d'Histoire du Judaïsme, and many others.

In 2002, Boltanski made the installation Totentanz II, a shadow installation with copper figures, for the underground Centre for International Light Art (CILA) in Unna, Germany. Nine years later, the Es Baluard museum in Mallorca exhibited Signatures from July to September 2011. The installation was conceived by Boltanski specifically for Es Baluard and which is focused on the memory of the workers who in the 17th century built the museum's walls.

In the winter of 2017–2018, Boltanski created a new installation for the Oude Kerk, titled After. It tackled the theme of what will come after life has come to an end. The exhibition was shown from November 2017 until April 2018.

== Personal life ==
Boltanski was married to Annette Messager, who is also a contemporary artist, until his death. They chose not to have children. They lived in Malakoff, outside Paris. He was the brother of sociologist Luc Boltanski and uncle of writer Christophe Boltanski.

Boltanski died on 14 July 2021 at Hôpital Cochin in Paris. He was 76, and suffered from an unspecified illness prior to his death.

Following Boltanski's death, his will designated his wife as holder of the economic rights to his work, and another person close to him as holder of its moral rights.

== Gallery ==
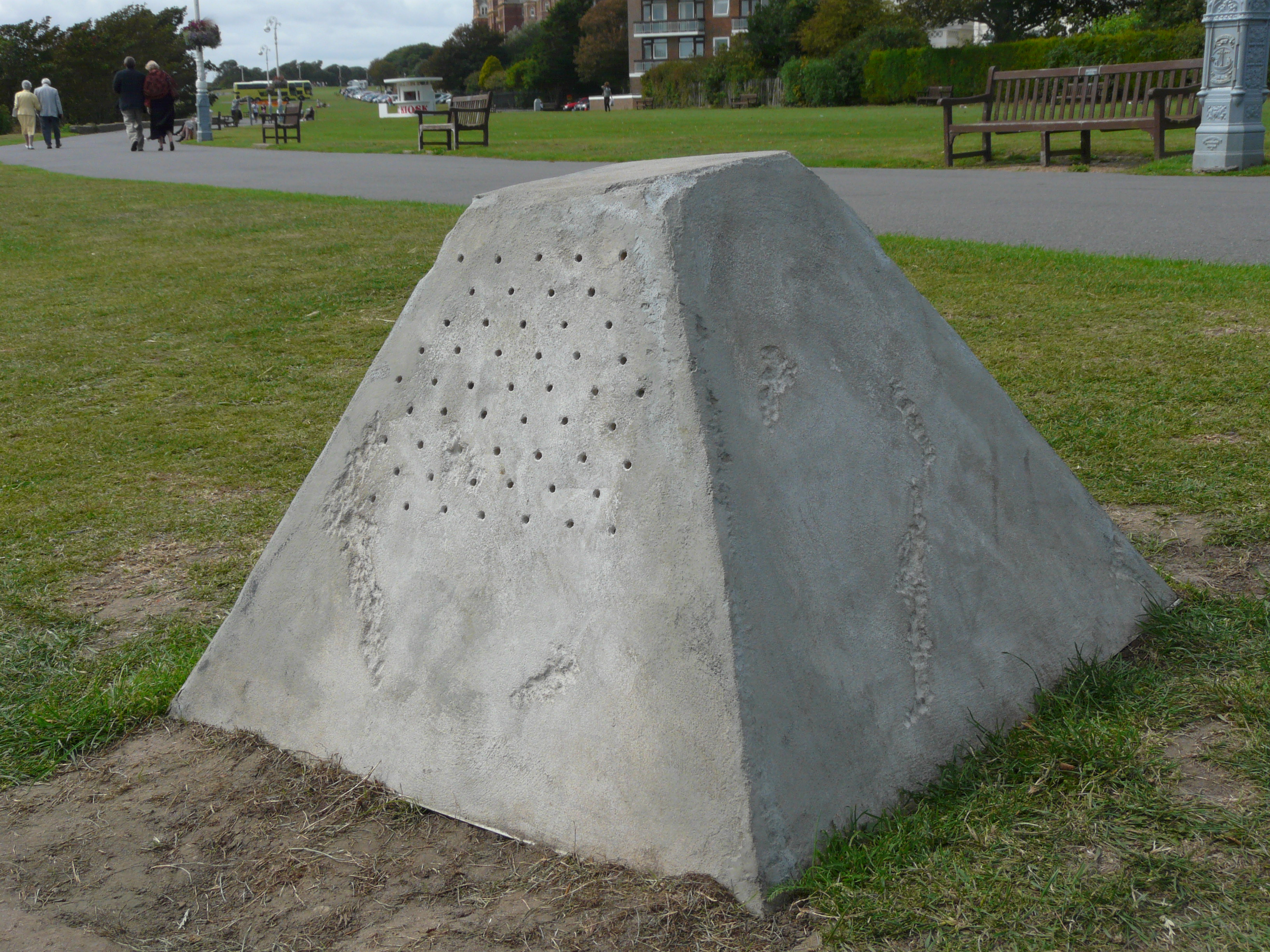
Sound installation The Whispers, Folkestone Triennal (2008)

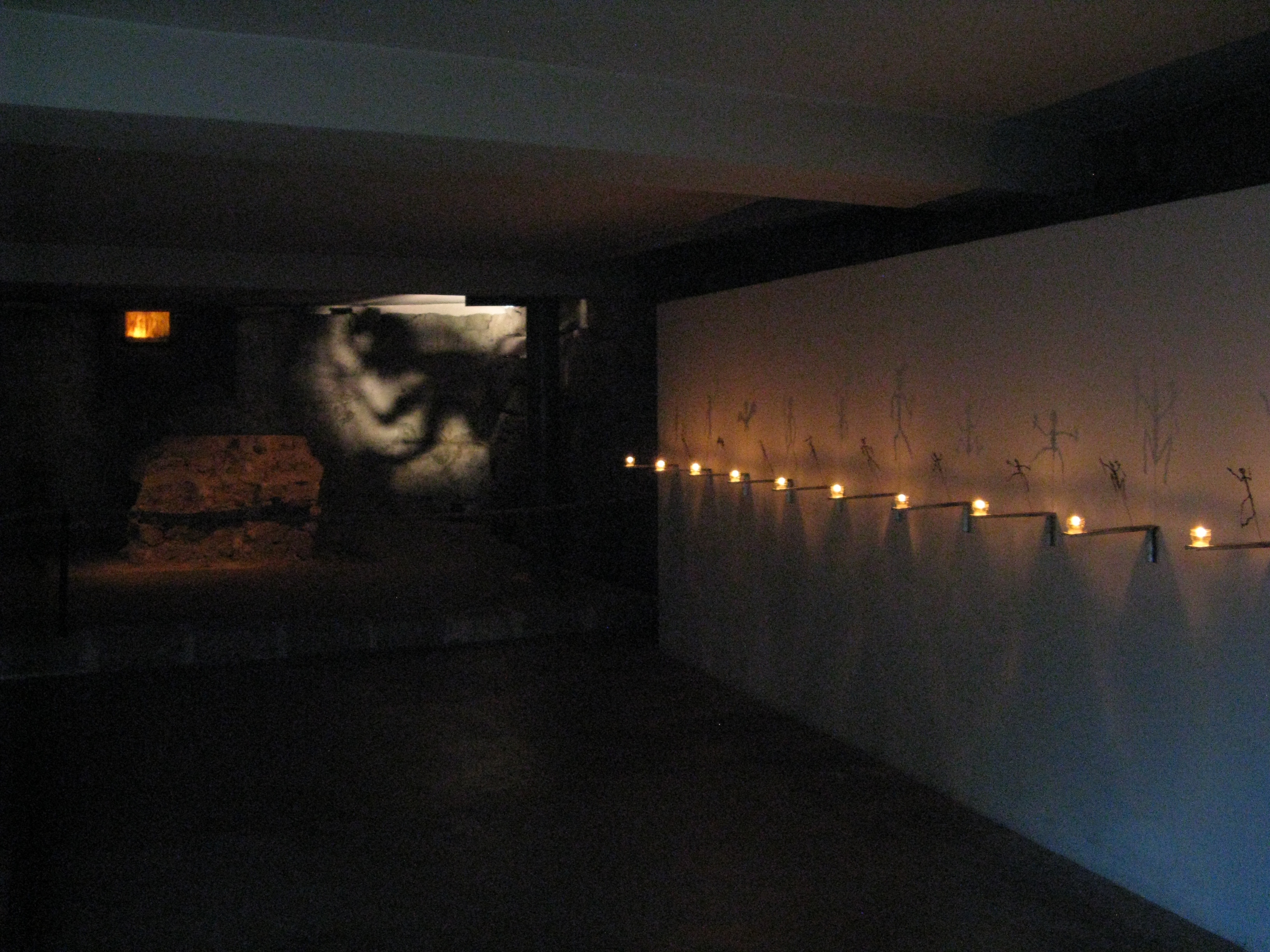
Vanitas, Salzburger Dom 2008.

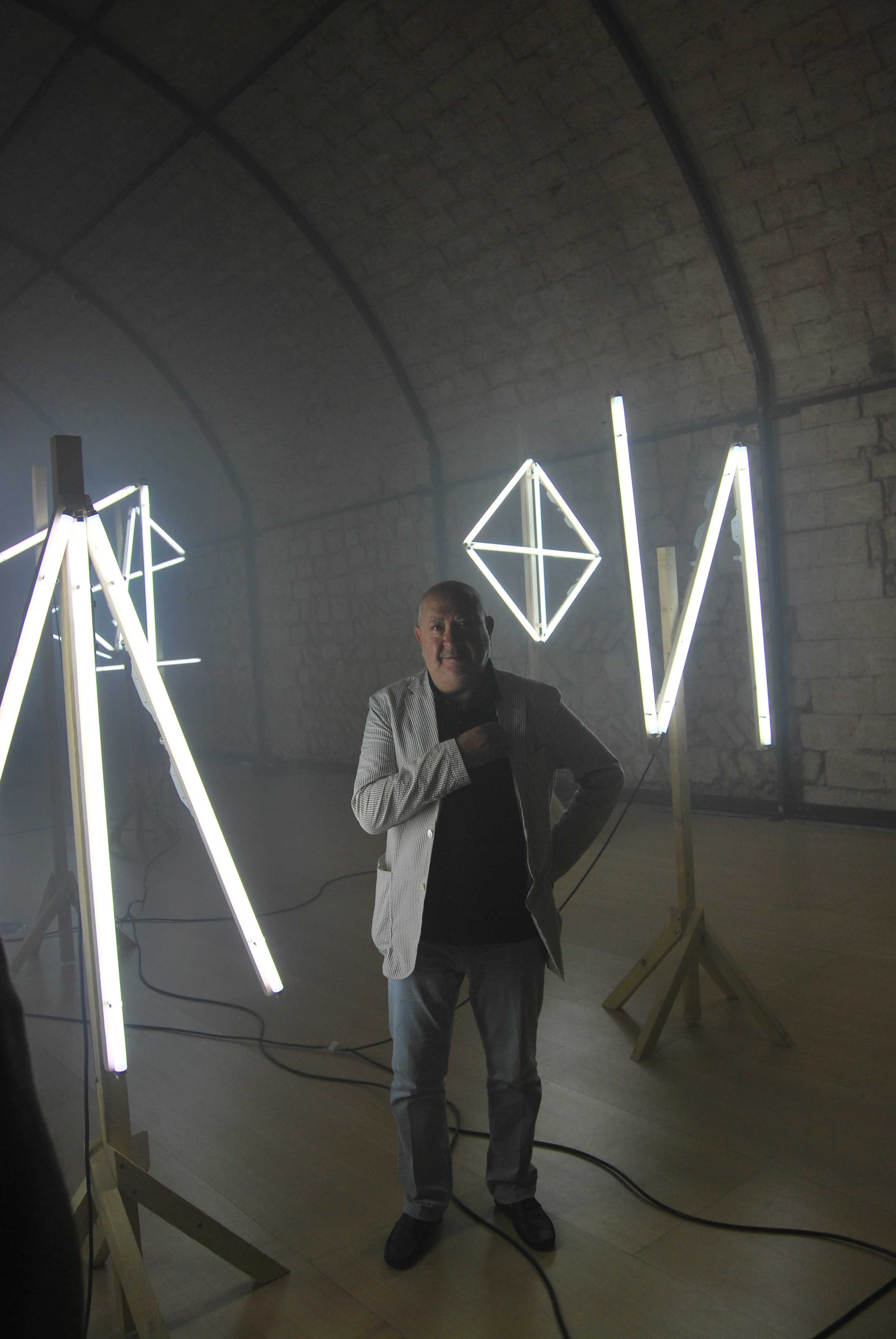
Signatures, 2011

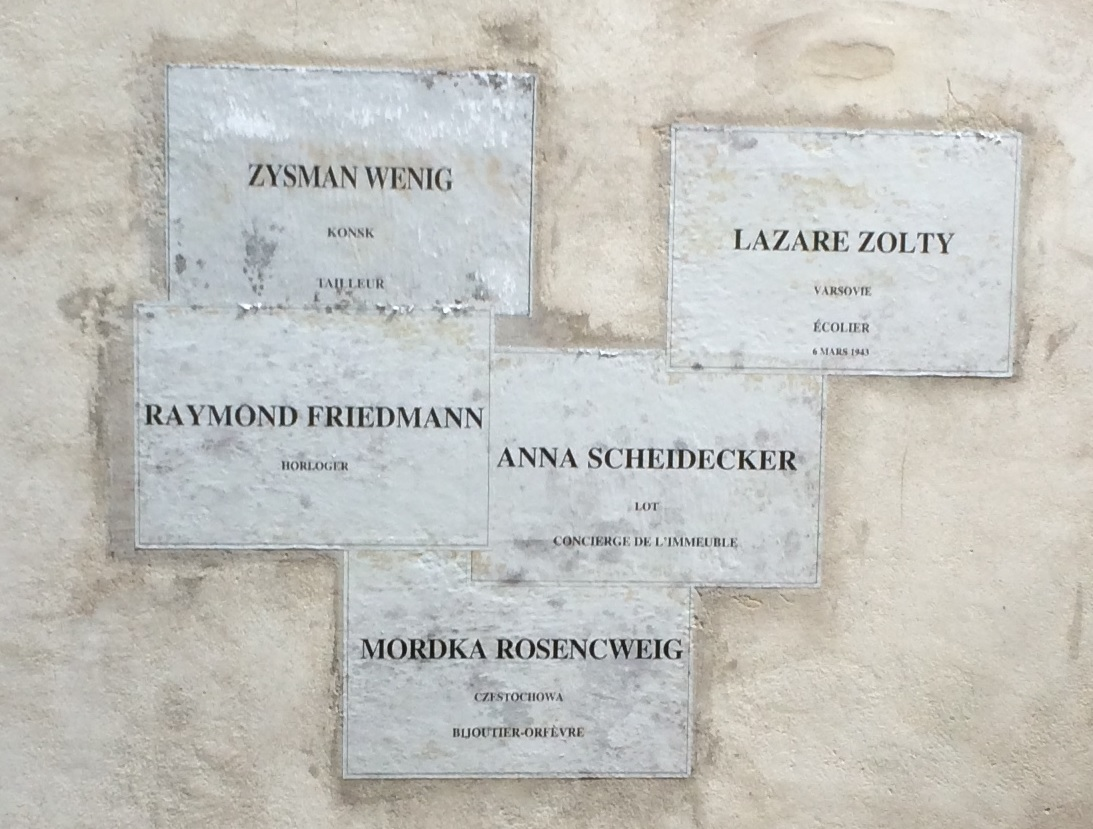
The inhabitants of the Hôtel de Saint-Aignan in 1939 (1998) – Musée d'Art et d'Histoire du Judaïsme

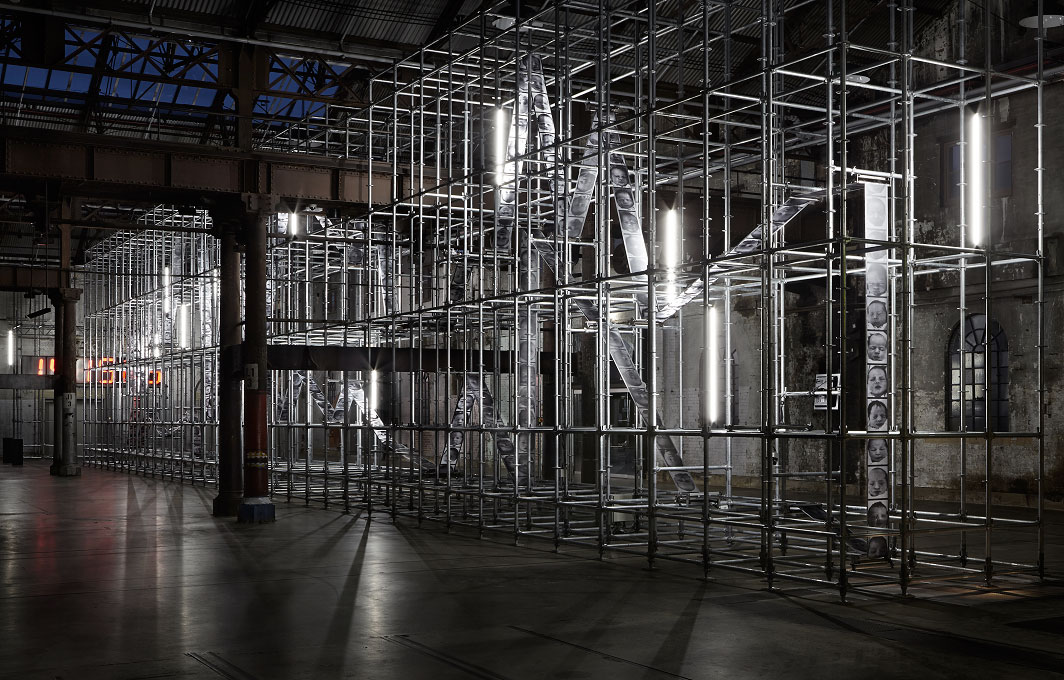
Chance, 2014

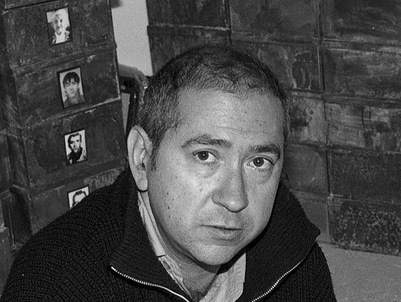
Christian Boltanski, 1990

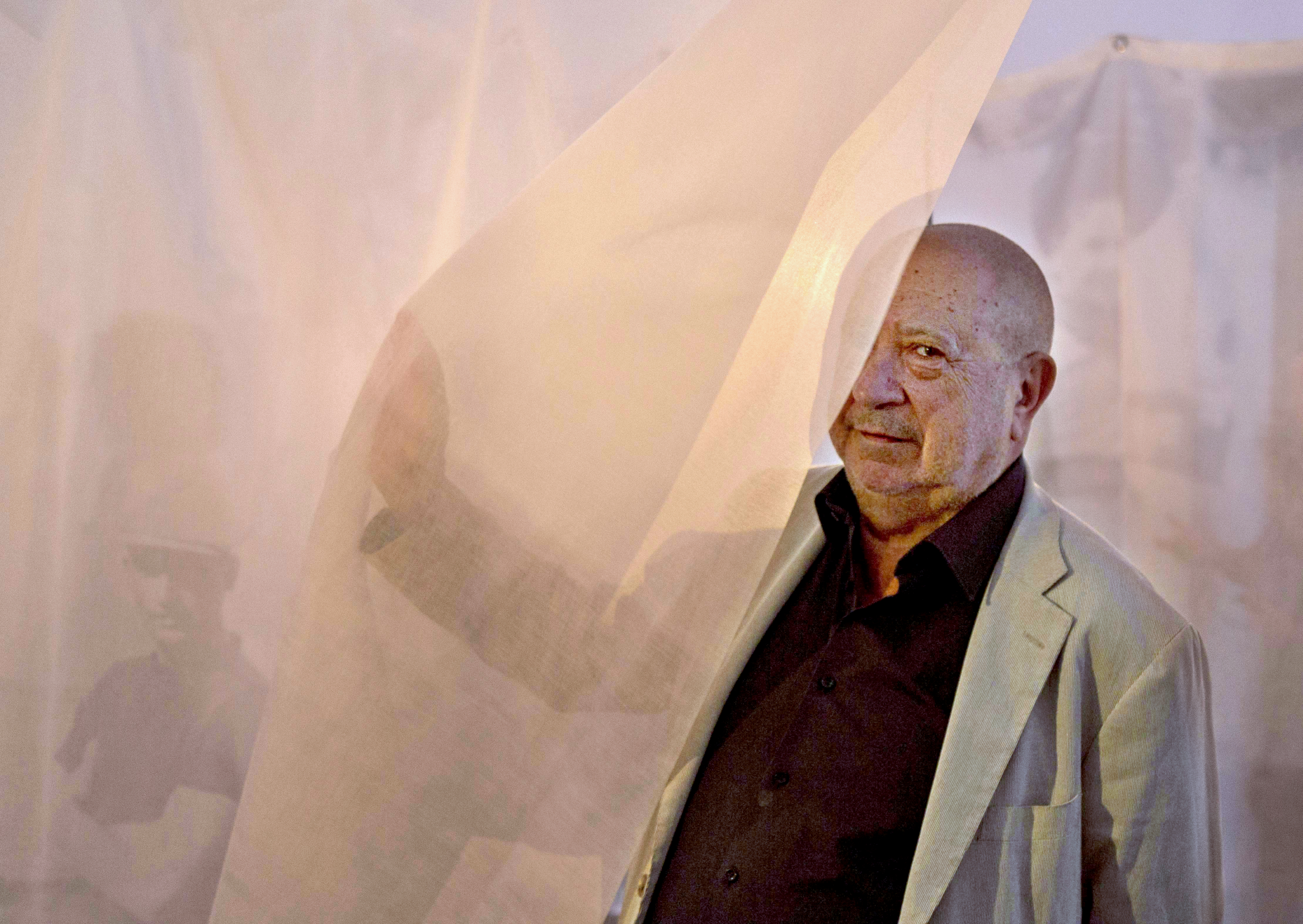
Christian Boltanski, 2015

== Prizes ==
- 1994 Kunstpreis Aachen
- 1996 Rolandpreis für Kunst im öffentlichen Raum
- 2007 billionéateurs sans frontières award for visual arts by Cultures France
- 2006 Praemium Imperiale Award by the Japan Art Association
- 2001 Goslarer Kaiserring, Goslar, Germany
- 2001 Kunstpreis, given by Nord/LB, Braunschweig, Germany
- 2006 Praemium Imperiale award for sculpture, Japan

== Works and installations ==
- 1969 "L'Homme qui tousse"
- 1973 "Inventory of Objects Belonging to a Young Man of Oxford"
- 1988 "Christian Boltanski: Lessons of Darkness"
- 1989 Monument to the Lycée Chases
- 1990 "Reserve of Dead Swiss (Réserve de Suisses morts)"
- 1994 Christian Boltanski: Dead or Alive
- 2002 "Totentanz II"
- 2010 "No Man's Land"
- 2010: "People (Personnes)"
- 2014 "Animitas"
- 2017 "After"
- 2017 "Mysteries"
