= Novopay =

Web-based school payroll system in New Zealand

Novopay website

Novopay is a web-based payroll system for state and state integrated schools in New Zealand, processing the pay of 110,000 teaching and support staff at 2,457 schools. It was purchased by the New Zealand Ministry of Education for $182 million over ten years, and was implemented in August 2012 after seven years of planning and development by Australian human resources company Talent2. From the outset, the system led to widespread problems with over 8,000 teachers receiving the wrong pay and in some cases no pay at all; within a few months, 90% of schools were affected.

The 'Novopay debacle' as it was called received almost daily media attention, causing embarrassment for the new Minister of Education Hekia Parata, and contributed to the resignation of newly recruited Education secretary Leslie Longstone.

In October 2014, Novopay transitioned to be 100% operated by the New Zealand Ministry of Education under current Minister Responsible for Novopay, Steven Joyce. Talent2 continues to provide the software but services and the accuracy of payroll is now the responsibility of the Ministry of Education through the government owned company, Education Payroll Ltd. Under the new arrangement the government assumes full responsibility for the provision of the education payroll service. They have since spent millions ($45M by 2015) in taxpayer funds fixing problems with the system.

The error rate for payments is now less than 0.2 per cent, less than half the 0.5 per cent acceptable error rate as defined by the Novopay technical review.

== Talent2 background ==
Talent2 was started by two Australian entrepreneurs, Andrew Banks and Geoff Morgan. Banks and Morgan founded the Australian recruitment company Morgan and Banks in 1985. In 1994 the company was listed on the Australian stock exchange and sold four years later for $470 million.

Banks and Morgan launched Talent2 in 2003 focusing on recruitment and payroll management. The company grew rapidly and soon had 1700 staff in 19 countries and a turnover of more than $300 million a year. It claimed to have 2400 clients in the Asia Pacific region with more than 740,000 employees whose pay was managed by the company. The chief executive of Talent2 is John Rawlinson, a former physical education teacher. He has been at the head of the company from its incorporation.

During the period the Novopay contract was being negotiated with the Government, the company was having financial problems and was later delisted from the Australian stock exchange.

== The choice of Talent2 ==
Prior to adopting Novopay, the payroll for 90,000 teachers and school staff nationwide had been managed for the Ministry of Education by Datacom Group. However, in February 2005, the Ministry of Education decided a new payroll system for teachers was required. Ministry documents reveal that the existing payroll service had been stable during the previous eight years, but was considered 'dated'; there was no on-line access and the system provided insufficient data to "support the more complex information and research needs of the Ministry".

Datacom lost the contract to Talent 2, the creators of Novopay, in a competitive tender in 2005. Talent2 won the contract ahead of ten other tenderers. The Novopay contract was initially signed off by the Labour Government in 2008. It was subsequently renegotiated by National twice.

Because of delays in the development of the programme, it was not until August 2012 that Novopay was finally rolled out. When Steven Joyce was appointed to sort out problems with Novopay in 2013, he initiated discussions with Datacom in case the contract with Talent2 had to be scrapped.

== Payroll problems at NZ Post ==
Talent2 was also selected to provide a new payroll system at New Zealand Post. The Australian company was awarded the NZ Post contract in 2010 to create a centralised payroll programme to replace the existing regional system. After it went live in 2011, thousands of NZ Post workers were also under-paid or over-paid.

EPMU national industry organiser Joe Gallagher described the new NZ Post payroll as a "dog" of a system and said: "We had workers overpaid, underpaid, not paid, you name it, we had it. We had instances where people got significantly large amounts and occasions where they were paid minus amounts." He said he was aware of team leaders "paying for their employees' groceries and petrol to cover pay problems, while others had faced the possibility of mortgage defaults." Given NZ Post's problems with Talent2, Mr Gallagher wondered why the company was awarded another Government contract. In fact, contract negotiations with the Ministry of Education appear to have begun long before the contract with NZ Post was signed – although NZ Post went live first.

NZ Post took Talent2 to task over the mistakes but the software had to be re-written and it took nearly two years before the system began to improve. Steven Joyce, who was subsequently tasked with sorting out problems with Novopay, said in January 2013 he was aware of NZ Post's payroll problems but could not yet comment on "the similarities or otherwise" between the two.

== Implementation of Novopay in 2012 ==
=== Delays in implementation ===
Talent2 was originally awarded the multimillion-dollar contract by the Labour Government on the recommendation of Education Minister Trevor Mallard – but it was renegotiated twice by the subsequent National Government. Once the contract was signed, Novopay was meant to go live in May 2010 but the company missed a number of deadlines which delayed the rollout by more than two years. Along the way, the Ministry of Education spent $650,000 trialling the system before it was rolled out nationally. More than half of the 731 trial-users felt they were not ready for the system to go live but the Government went ahead anyway.

The system was last tested three months before it became operational, and revealed 147 software defects and made 6000 errors. TV3 reported that Education Minister Hekia Parata, Associate Education Minister Craig Foss and the Minister of Finance Bill English were all informed about the 'bugs' in the system but 'signed off on it anyway'. Four independent agencies – Pricewaterhouse Coopers, the Ministry of Social Development, the Primary Industries Ministry and the New Zealand Transport Agency – also all advised the system should go ahead.

=== Errors ===
In the first payround of the new system, 5000 school staff were underpaid (5.05%) and 15 were not paid at all. International auditors, Deloitte, recommends the error rate should be consistently below 1% in such systems. However, Novopay has been problematic on each successive payround with thousands of school staff finding discrepancies in their pay. Some teachers were getting paid too much, some not enough, and others nothing at all. One of the bugs in the system caused long or hyphenated names to appear twice in the payroll.

In the pay period 9 Jan 2013 through to 22 Jan 2013, $139 million was the total gross payroll, 176 were underpaid or not paid, giving an error rate of 0.29% according to the Ministry. This figure does not include teachers who were overpaid.

Concerns were raised that Novopay also committed breaches of privacy by giving teachers' personal information, including bank account details, to the wrong schools. A Manawatu school principal discovered that a glitch in Novopay allowed staff at a different school to change the pay details of one of his teachers. Opiki School principal Bede Gilmore said "the breach showed there was opportunity for fraud on a huge scale".

Many of the errors were described as 'bizarre'. One teacher was paid for 39 days, instead of 39 hours getting thousands of dollars more than he should have. Another teacher was overpaid by $39,000. She returned the money immediately, but two months later, had not been paid since. A relief teacher was paid for working at two different schools on the same day – one in Upper Hutt and the other in Auckland. Ashburton College principal, Grant McMillan, said the 'most ludicrous' problem was when "Novopay took $40,000 directly out of the school bank account to pay a number of teachers who had never worked at the college". Another difficulty was the amount of time it was taking callers to get through to Talent2's helpline. When Gladstone School principal Margaret Hyslop called for assistance, she found she was 1,117th in the complaints queue.

The problems seem to compound with each successive payday upsetting school staff nationwide. Only three months after Novopay was rolled out, the teachers' union, the NZEI, called for a public inquiry; NZEI National Secretary Paul Goulter said Novopay had been causing 'endless stress for schools and staff for months and needs to be fixed immediately'. By February 2013, over 14,000 teachers and school support staff were owed nearly $12 million in backpay because of all the mistakes. More than $600,000 had been overpaid to teachers by Novopay although about 80% has already been repaid.

In addition to the errors in their pay, school staff have had to spend hours entering additional data on the system to try and correct the mistakes. By February, the Ministry had received 225 invoices for extra administration costs (for which then Associate Education Minister Craig Foss had promised to compensate schools) totalling nearly $1.2 million. In November 2012, retail banks across New Zealand made the extraordinary step of offering school staff interest-free overdrafts after many employees missed out on being paid for up to four months.

Five months after its implementation (mid-December 2012), a survey showed only 16% of schools had no errors that pay round, compared to 36% a month before, suggesting Novopay's performance was getting worse, rather than better. On 15 November the Ministry of Education said it would be taking legal action against Talent2, seeking financial compensation for the errors, which would be used to pay teachers.

At the start of 2015, the error rate for payments was less than 0.2 per cent, less than half the 0.5 per cent acceptable error rate as defined by the Novopay technical review.

=== Resignation of Leslie Longstone ===
In November 2012, newly recruited education secretary, Leslie Longstone, said it could take a year to fix the system. However, as Minister of Education, Hekia Parata received most of the criticism for Novopay's failures. Parata reportedly fell out with Longstone – who subsequently resigned. In 2013, it was revealed that Longstone received severance pay of $425,000 after only 13 months into her five-year appointment and had been paid $50,000 to relocate from Britain to New Zealand to take the job.

=== Talent2's response ===
In response to publicity about the errors, Talent2's chief executive, John Rawlinson, said there were "no technical problems with Novopay". He claimed the software was based on a previous payroll system, Alesco, that Talent2 had already been using for 15 years. Alesco had been developed using Oracle database software. Interviewed by the National Business Review, Mr Rawlinson said: "Interestingly enough there’s not really a problem with the technology. The vast majority of issues are about interfacing with our help centre". He added that the company had responded by moving another nine payroll experts to New Zealand and now has 130 staff dedicated to Novopay. Despite Mr Rawlinson's claims, the Government subsequently paid Talent2 another $5 million to produce software upgrades, the first of which went into operation in February 2013.

With intense scrutiny on the system, in 2013 additional reporting was put in place, including media releases after each pay round. Additional information is on the website, including average call waiting times updated daily. Talent2 committed to reduce waiting times to a maximum of four minutes. During February, the time varied from 12 seconds one day to 29 minutes on another. The only day the waiting time was 12 seconds (6 February, which was a public holiday due to Waitangi Day) was the only day in the entire month the waiting time was below four minutes.

== Problems in 2013 ==
In January 2013, the Sunday Star-Times revealed that mistakes by Novopay have begun to involve other government departments and "spawned a number of serious side-effects" that have misdirected ACC levies, child support payments, superannuation funds, KiwiSaver and student loan payments which are not getting through to the right account – despite being debited from teachers' payslips.

Novopay was also forced to make bulk payments to schools after teachers had not been paid for weeks on end. This pushed some teachers into higher tax brackets leaving them with less pay than they were entitled to. These teachers will not be able to get back their lost pay until they file tax returns at the end of the financial year – but with their payslips now full of errors, this may be very difficult. Another issue is that schools are now facing annual audits with their bank accounts so depleted, they have had to put Novopay down as a debtor. With so many schools affected, the Auditor-General has decided to adopt a monitoring role on behalf of teachers.

Catching up on backpay from Novopay also requires teachers to go to considerable lengths to prove their identity. This is because Novopay introduced a temporary "fix" for the problem by creating a new identity for teachers who were underpaid. To be repaid wages owing to them (in their original identity), teachers have to provide Novopay with "copies of their qualifications and a letter of endorsement from their school signed by a Justice of the Peace and verified by the Ministry of Education". It is only after this process of verification that Novopay corrects their pay.

At the end of February a survey of principals found 23 admin staff have already resigned, and as many as 50 may have quit over the ongoing problems with Novopay. The survey also found the proportion of schools experiencing difficulties had gone up from 86% in October to 96%. President of the PPTA Angela Roberts said schools were yet to receive any financial assistance from the Government for all the extra hours staff spent sorting out the problems. Also in February, the Post Primary Teachers Association surveyed 4500 teachers and found 36% had not bothered to report mistakes in their pay because they were either "too embarrassed or feared putting school administrators under more pressure".

In March, further concerns arose when it was reported that Novopay had called in debt collectors to get back overpayments made to teachers, even for as little as $22. A new glitch also appeared in the system, with 100 teachers having their contracts wrongly 'terminated' by Novopay at the end of the first school term.

=== Appointment of Steven Joyce ===
In January 2013, as part of a Cabinet reshuffle, Prime Minister John Key announced Economic Development Minister Steven Joyce – who the media began referring to as 'Mr Fixit' – would take over the handling of Novopay. Mr Joyce was initially reluctant to discuss the various options being considered by the Government but indicated that scrapping Talent2's contract was possible but unlikely. Two weeks later, after talking to the stakeholders including Talent2 chief executive, John Rawlinson, Mr Joyce changed his tune and said the system might be scrapped. Before making a decision, he said a ministerial inquiry and a technical audit of Novopay would be conducted. The technical review is expected to cost $200,000 and should be completed by the end of February; the ministerial inquiry will cost $500,000 and should be finished by the end of May.

In early February, Mr Joyce released hundreds of documents which showed the Ministry and Talent2 had a testy relationship prior to the national rollout of Novopay. The documents show the Ministers who gave the go ahead to roll out Novopay were aware of its deficiencies and the Ministry of Education almost abandoned the system four months before it became operational. In fact the Ministry of Education had been trying to get Talent2 to meet operational milestones for two years. One of the documents released was a memo written by Lesley Longstone and her deputy Anne Jackson stating four deadlines had been missed by Talent2 and they warned the company it was in breach of its contract. No action was taken because Talent2 threatened legal action against the Ministry if they were hit with a breach. Steven Joyce and acting Education Secretary Peter Hughes also began a dialogue with Datacom, the previous payroll provider about creating a contingency plan in case Novopay had to be scrapped.

One of the main problems identified by Mr Joyce was that Talent2 had "no senior management bandwidth" in New Zealand. It seems the lack of senior executives meant the company was unable to make decisions about increasing its financial investment to bolster the service when it got into difficulty. Behind the scenes, Talent2's share price had dropped dramatically and in September 2012, the company was delisted from the Australian stock exchange.

A couple of weeks later Mr Joyce provided an update on his investigation into Novopay and said "Talent2 had been issued with formal notices of a breach of contract and key performance indicators". However, he also indicated the Government had agreed to pay Talent2 another $5 million to fix the software bugs and boost the number of data processing staff and staff at its call centre. At the end of February, a software upgrade was launched with further upgrades planned for March and April. However, the errors continued leading the Post Primary Teachers' Association to launch group legal action seeking compensation for "the hurt, humiliation and financial suffering caused by the dysfunctional payroll system".

=== The technical audit ===
On 19 March Joyce released the results of a technical review of the system. It found there were 526 defects with Novopay and a backlog of 19,000 pay-related problems. The defects were rated – 49 were classified as very serious, 320 as serious, 115 as moderate and 42 as cosmetic. Prior to Novopay going live in June 2012, the Ministry's own audit found only 147 software defects. Joyce also said there would be a $6 million compensation package to cover extra administration costs – $500 per school plus $105 per full-time teacher employed at the school for each pay round.

In addition to so many technical errors, the audit revealed that Talent2 assumed that 90% of school administrators would fill in data online. But only 70% were doing so because "forms for part-time teachers and support staff do not work online" and have to be sent in by email. The audit found that Talent2 lacked the staff to handle the extra workload and were reluctant to hire more. It concluded: "We do not believe long-term stability can be delivered by the current processes and resources. It would require materially elevated and sustained effort by both the Ministry and Talent2". Mr Joyce has put pressure on the ministry's previous payroll system provider, Datacom, to be ready to implement a back-up system should it be required.

In the first pay period for 2013, 1647 teachers were overpaid, 206 were underpaid and 39 were not paid at all – affecting 286 schools. These errors were the result of a brand new glitch introduced into Novopay as part of Talent2's attempts to fix the system. Commenting on the new flaw, Steven Joyce said: "I am advised that it was a one-off event that has been corrected." In April, PricewaterhouseCoopers announced 363 defects had been fixed since the end of February, but another 172 had emerged. Since February, the percentage of teachers affected by errors was dropping with each successive pay round – going from 2.2% (and affecting 628 schools) in the 23rd pay period to 0.43% of staff (affecting 232 schools) in the 26th pay round.

=== Cost ===
By the end of April 2013, the cost to the Government of fixing Novopay had risen to $11 million and was still climbing. In May the Ministry of Education revealed it had spent an extra $1.7 million paying 12 consultants to help sort out problems with Novopay.

By the start of 2015, the cost of fixing had risen to $45 million.

=== Decision to keep Novopay ===
In May 2013, Joyce said Novopay was here to stay for the time-being, as the number of technical errors continued to be reduced. The most recent pay run affected only 166 schools, with 127 non-payments and 80 overpayments. The error rate was below 0.5% for three of the last four pay periods, which is considered 'normal' for complex payroll systems. Teachers overpaid small amounts wouldn't be made to pay it back. Although small overpayments would be written off, those of $100 in a single payment or $300 over the course of a full year, would still be pursued. There was still a backlog of 25,000 errors to be dealt with.

== Novopay now operated by Ministry of Education ==
In July 2014, the Ministry of Education and Talent2 mutually agreed to a new service delivery model which saw the operation of the Novopay payroll service transition to a government owned company, Education Payroll Ltd.

Talent2's Alesco software continues to be used by Education Payroll to process the Ministry's payroll under a six-year license arrangement.

The transition occurred on 17 October 2014, and saw the government assume full responsibility for the provision of the education payroll service and also the responsibility for customisations of the software.

The error rate for payments is now less than 0.2 per cent, less than half the 0.5 per cent acceptable error rate as defined by the Novopay technical review.

== See also ==
Police software failure: INCIS
