= David Cittadini =

New Zealanad businessman and technologist

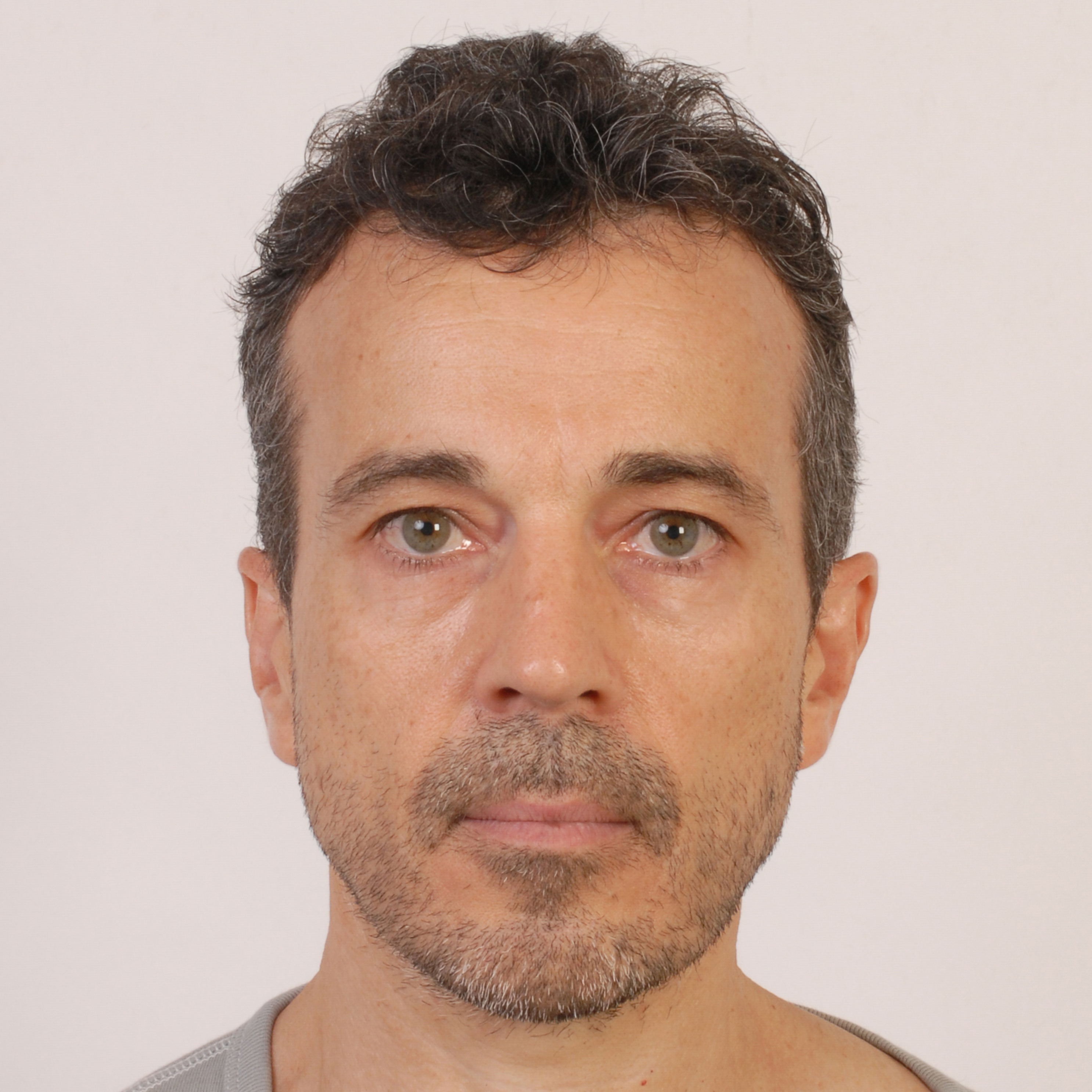
- Future Technologies Conference, New York, August 2014
- Occupations: Technologist, software architect, software developer, audio engineer

David Cittadini was an important technologist in the New Zealand business market in the 1990s. He was involved in creating and leading a number of important technology developments within New Zealand, such as Object-oriented programming and Distributed object computing. He was a member of a number of New Zealand technology-related standard groups (including Standards New Zealand) and was involved in a number of international standard bodies, such as the Object Management Group, and was an energetic proponent of leading-edge approaches and technologies in New Zealand.

== Technology career ==
He is recorded as being the initial Technology Architect for the INCIS Project and was strongly identified as being the initiator of the leading-edge technology approach of the INCIS project. However, the August 1994 Sapphire Technology Ltd handover report, tabled as part of the 2000 Ministerial Inquiry into the project, Cittadini recommended that New Zealand Police should not proceed with the project; the project subsequently collapsed (see INCIS).

He has contributed to many technology-based books, such as Java Development on PDAs where Cittadini is credited as a key contributor by the author Daryl Wilding-McBride. He is the author of many published technology articles, such as a Java Naming article published in the Java Developers Journal.

He was an early adopter of a number of leading-edge technologies, such as those developed by Taligent. He was the only non-IBM person on IBMs internal technology review team and was the only person to develop and release a product using Taligent technology

He created the initial firewall configuration script which is now a very important security component in numerous Unix implementations, such as FreeS/WAN.

Cittadini was one of the earliest Solutions Architect in New Zealand and Australia. He created a comprehensive Solution architecture, called the Sapphire Enterprise Architecture for analyzing, describing and building complex enterprise-based Information Technology systems.

== Audio and film career ==
In 2013 Cittadini, along with Andrew Hills, used Binaural recording techniques and technologies on the Australian short film The Blind Passenger. On 29 August 2013 and 31 August 2013 he recorded The Metropolitan Orchestra using binaural recording techniques, the first recording of an orchestra in Australia using binaural recording techniques.

== Filmography ==
=== Short films ===
Year	Film
2013	The Blind Passenger

== Music ==
Cittadini is the developer and maintainer of the BJFE Library, which contains a complete list and description of every guitar effects pedal built by Bjorn Juhl.
