= Tito Cittadini =

Argentine painter (1886–1960)

Tito Cittadini (1886–1960) was an Argentine painter. He was born in Buenos Aires to Italian immigrants, and in 1907 he began the study of architecture in Buenos Aires. He traveled to Europe in 1910, and at that time decided to switch his study to painting. In 1911 he began tutelage under Catalan painter Hermen Anglada, in Paris. Due to Anglada's urging, Cittadini made several trips to Spain during this period, and in 1913 he made his first trip to Majorca. The island captivated him, and it gradually became the central focus of his work. When World War I broke out in 1914, Cittadini established his permanent residency in Majorca, thereby insulating himself from the complications of that conflict. However, he continued to travel often to other countries.

Cittadini was a prolific artist, working in oils, watercolor, and pencil. He also published several articles discussing theory and practice in painting. A posthumous work (1965) showcased his thoughts, Vademecum del aspirante a pintor (The Student Painter's Handbook).

Cittadini died in Pollença, Majorca, in 1960. Most of his exhibited works now hang in Majorcan museums.

== Representative works ==
- Man making a basket (Hombre haciendo una cesta)
- Suburbs of Majorca (Suburbios de Mallorca)
- Women Sewing (Mujeres cosiendo)
- Benzi Toga (Benzi Toga)

== Bibliography ==
- Francisca Lladó: Pintores argentinos en Mallorca (1900–1939). Palma de Mallorca, 2006
- Miguel Ángel Colomar, Tito Cittadini. Palma de Mallorca, 1956
- Rafael Perelló, Pintores extranjeros en Mallorca: Cittadini, Cook, Hubert, Verburg. Palma de Mallorca, 1979
- Tito Cittadini, Pretextos y aforismos. Círculo de Bellas Artes, Palma de Mallorca, 1982
