= Sally Brooker =

New Zealand inorganic chemist

Sally Brooker MNZM
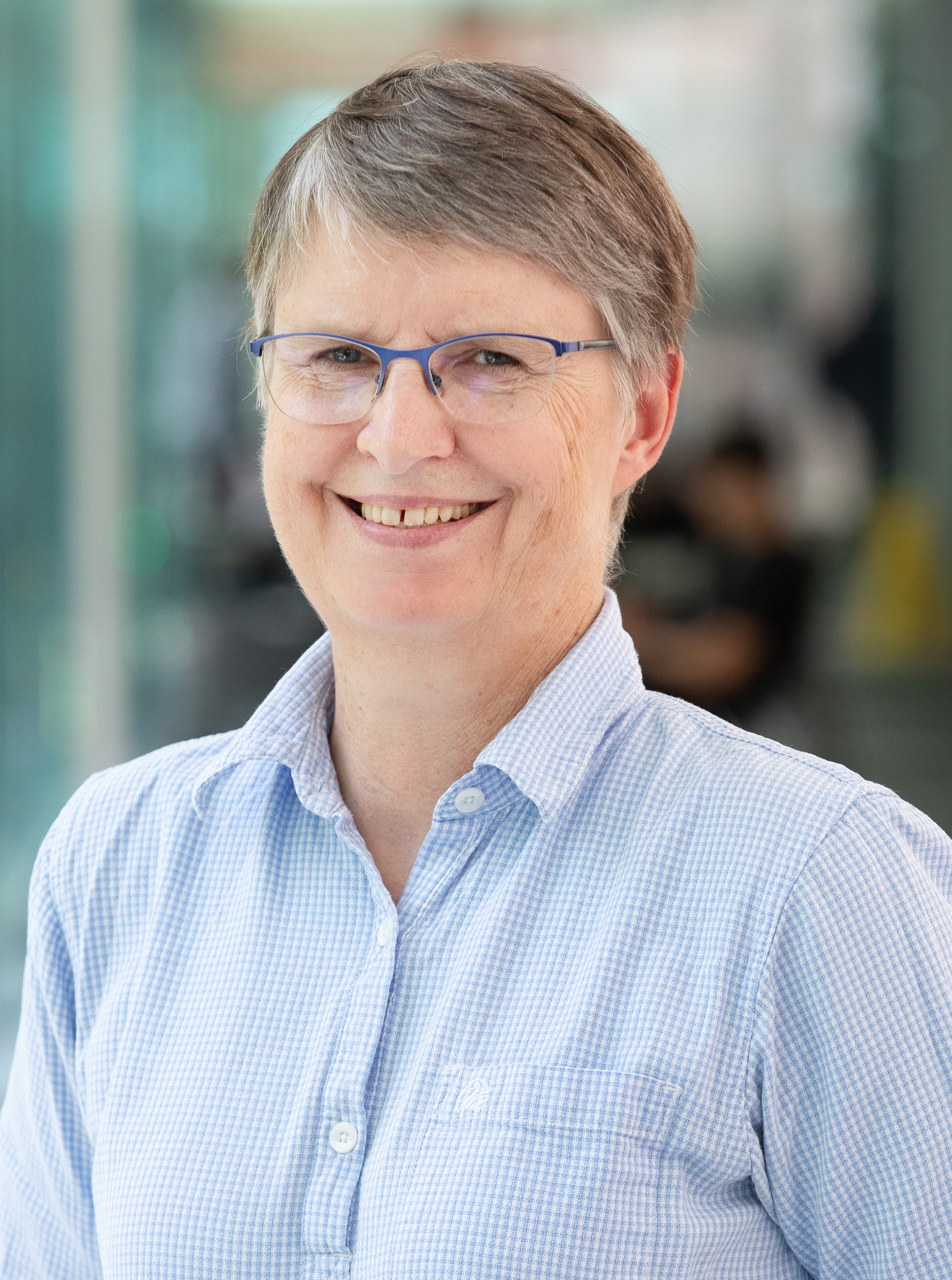
- Brooker in 2025
- Education: University of Canterbury
- Known for: Chemistry of transition metals and macrocycles
- Scientific career
- Fields: Inorganic chemistry
- Workplaces: University of Otago
- Thesis: Synthesis and characterisation of polynuclear complexes with macrocyclic and related ligands (1989)

Sally Anne Brooker MNZM is a New Zealand inorganic chemist. She has been a full professor at the University of Otago since 2006.

== Education ==
Brooker was educated at Hawarden Area School in North Canterbury from 1970 to 1982, and was dux of the school in her final year there. She went on to study chemistry at the University of Canterbury, first graduating Bachelor of Science with first-class honours, and then completing a PhD titled Synthesis and characterisation of polynuclear complexes with macrocyclic and related ligands under the supervision of Vickie McKee in 1989.

== Academic and research career ==
After a period of post-doctoral research with George Sheldrick at the University of Göttingen, Brooker returned to New Zealand to take up a lectureship in chemistry at the University of Otago in 1991. She rose to become a full professor in 2006.

Brooker's research is in the fields of transition-metal and macrocyclic chemistry. Her work has included the development of molecular switches and molecular magnets, with potential application in nanodevices.

== Honours and awards ==
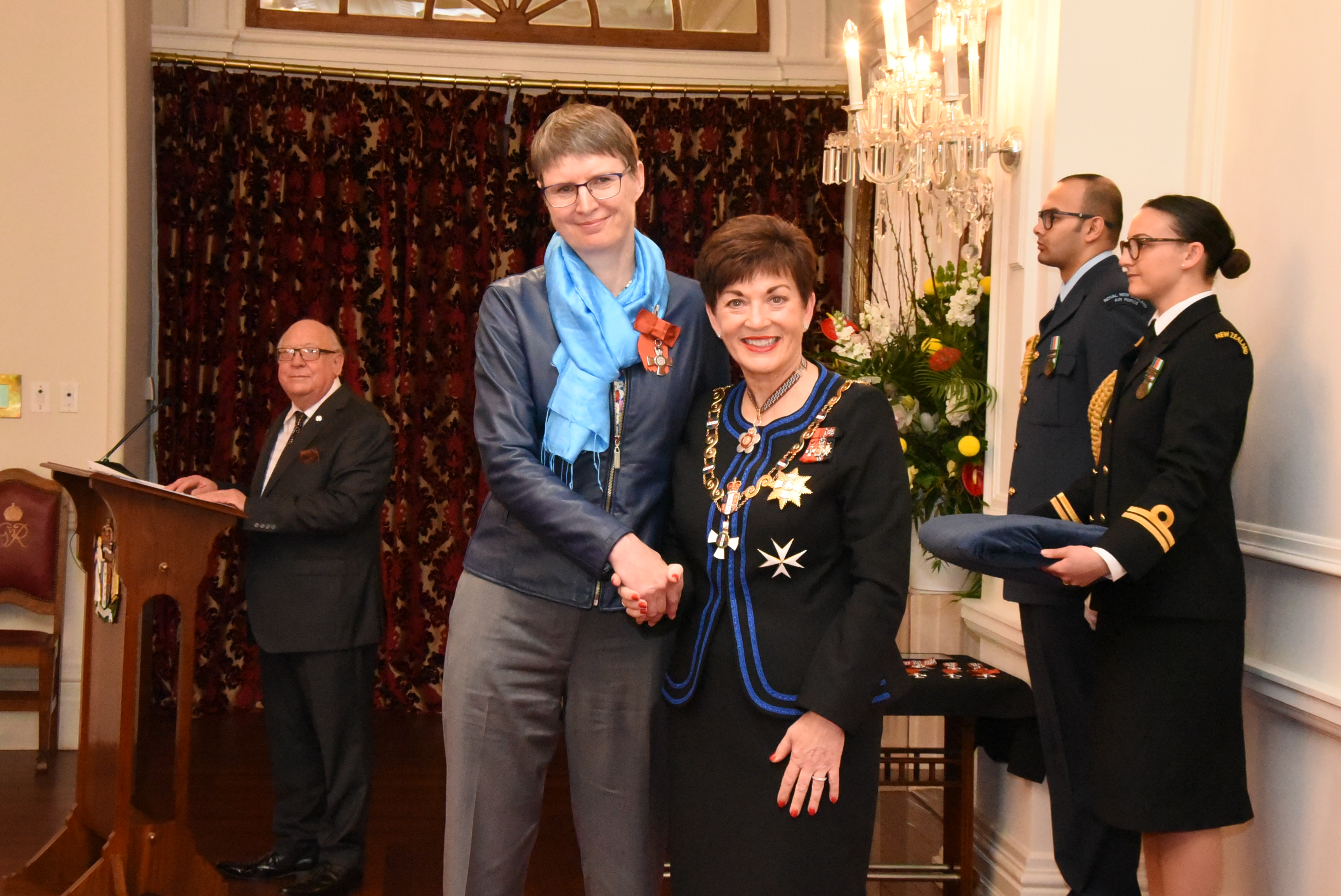
Brooker (centre left), after her investiture as a Member of the New Zealand Order of Merit by the governor-general, Dame Patsy Reddy, at Government House, Wellington, on 29 August 2017

In the 2017 Queen's Birthday Honours, Brooker was appointed a Member of the New Zealand Order of Merit, for services to science. Later that year, she won the Hector Medal from the Royal Society of New Zealand. Also in 2017, Brooker was selected as one of the Royal Society Te Apārangi's "150 women in 150 words", celebrating the contributions of women to knowledge in New Zealand.

Brooker was elected a Fellow of the Royal Society of New Zealand in 2007, and a Fellow of the Royal Society of Chemistry in 2011. She is also a Fellow of the New Zealand Institute of Chemistry. In October 2019, Brooker was appointed one of seven inaugural sesquicentennial distinguished chairs, or poutoko taiea, at Otago University. She was awarded the University's Distinguished Research Medal in 2015.

== Selected works ==
- Klingele, Marco H.; Brooker, Sally (2003). "The coordination chemistry of 4-substituted 3, 5-di (2-pyridyl)-4H-1, 2, 4-triazoles and related ligands". Coordination Chemistry Reviews. 241 (1–2): 119–132. doi:10.1016/s0010-8545(03)00049-3.
- Feltham, Humphrey L.C.; Brooker, Sally (2014). "Review of purely 4f and mixed-metal nd-4f single-molecule magnets containing only one lanthanide ion". Coordination Chemistry Reviews. 276: 1–33. doi:10.1016/j.ccr.2014.05.011.
- Beckmann, Udo; Brooker, Sally (2003). "Cobalt (II) complexes of pyridazine or triazole containing ligands: spin-state control". Coordination Chemistry Reviews. 245 (1–2): 17–29. doi:10.1016/s0010-8545(03)00030-4.
- Feltham, Humphrey L.C.; Lan, Yanhua; Klöwer, Frederik; Ungur, Liviu; Chibotaru, Liviu F.; Powell, Annie K.; Brooker, Sally (2011). "A non‐sandwiched macrocyclic monolanthanide single‐molecule magnet: the key role of axiality". Chemistry – A European Journal. 17 (16): 4362–4365. doi:10.1002/chem.201100438. PMID 21432925.
- Brooker, Sally (2001). "Complexes of thiophenolate-containing Schiff-base macrocycles and their amine analogues". Coordination Chemistry Reviews. 222 (1): 33–56. doi:10.1016/s0010-8545(01)00300-9.
- Rodriguez-Jimenez, Santiago; Yang, Mingrui; Stewart, Ian; Garden, Anna L.; Brooker, Sally (2017). "A simple method of predicting spin state in solution". Journal of the American Chemical Society. 139 (50): 18392–18396. doi:10.1021/jacs.7b11069. PMID 29156884.
