= Cran Bull =

New Zealand cricketer

Cran Bull MNZM
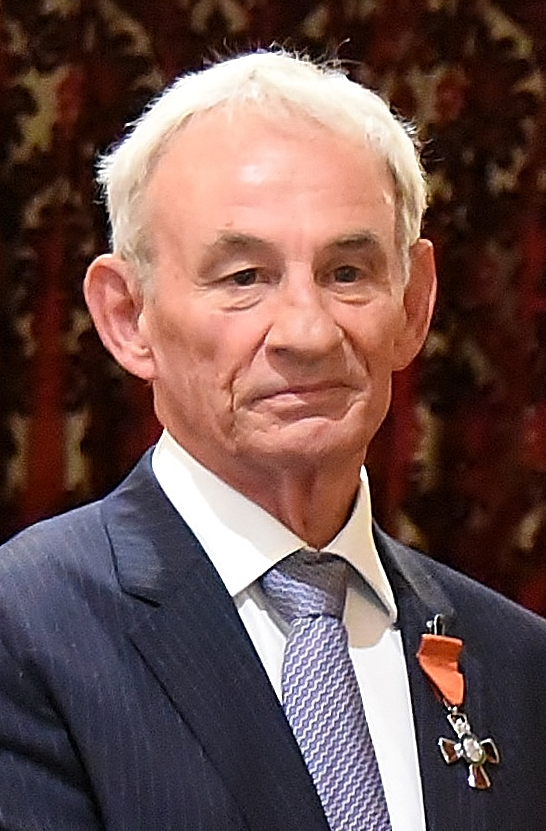
- Bull in 2017

Personal information
- Full name: Cranwell Leslie Bull
- Born: 19 August 1946 (age 80); Auckland, New Zealand
- Batting: Right-handed
- Role: Batsman

Domestic team information
- Years: Team
- 1965/66–1983/84: Canterbury
- FC debut: 10 February 1966 Canterbury v Otago
- Last FC: 9 March 1984 Canterbury v Auckland
- LA debut: 25 November 1973 Canterbury v New Zealand touring XI
- Last LA: 29 February 1984 Canterbury v Central District

Career statistics
Competition	First-class	List A
Matches	60	20
Runs scored	1,841	248
Batting average	19.58	13.77
100s/50s	1/6	0/0
Top score	115*	47
Balls bowled	30	–
Wickets	0	–
Bowling average	–	–
5 wickets in innings	–	–
10 wickets in match	–	–
Best bowling	–	–
Catches/stumpings	30/–	8/–
- Source: Cricinfo, 8 June 2017

Cranwell Leslie Bull MNZM (born 19 August 1946), commonly known as Cran Bull, is a New Zealand cricket administrator and former player, who played first-class cricket for Canterbury for 19 seasons.

== Early life ==
Born in Auckland on 19 August 1946, Bull was educated at Christchurch Boys' High School from 1960 to 1964. He went on to study law at the University of Canterbury, graduating LLB.

== Cricket ==
=== Playing career ===
Bull represented Canterbury at first-class level from 1965/66 until 1983/84, playing 60 matches in all. A right-handed batsman, he scored 1841 runs at an average of 19.58, with a high score of 115 not out. He captained Canterbury for four years.

=== Administration ===
For over 30 years, Bull was a committee member at the Christchurch High School Old Boys' Cricket Club, and served terms as both secretary and president. He was a member of the Canterbury Cricket Association (CCA) management committee, and was also a director and chair of the board of CCA. He was an elected executive member of the New Zealand Cricket Board of Control, including a period as deputy chair.

== Legal career ==
Bull became a partner at the Christchurch legal firm of Saunders & Co in 1972, having joined as a law clerk two years earlier. He specialised in commercial law, and retired in December 2016. He has provided legal advice to New Zealand Cricket, and was involved in reforming that body's constitution.

== Honours ==
Bull was the recipient of the Bert Sutcliffe Medal in 2012, awarded by New Zealand Cricket for outstanding services to cricket.

In the 2017 Queen's Birthday Honours, Bull was appointed a Member of the New Zealand Order of Merit for services to cricket.
