= Lesley Rhodes =

New Zealand scientist

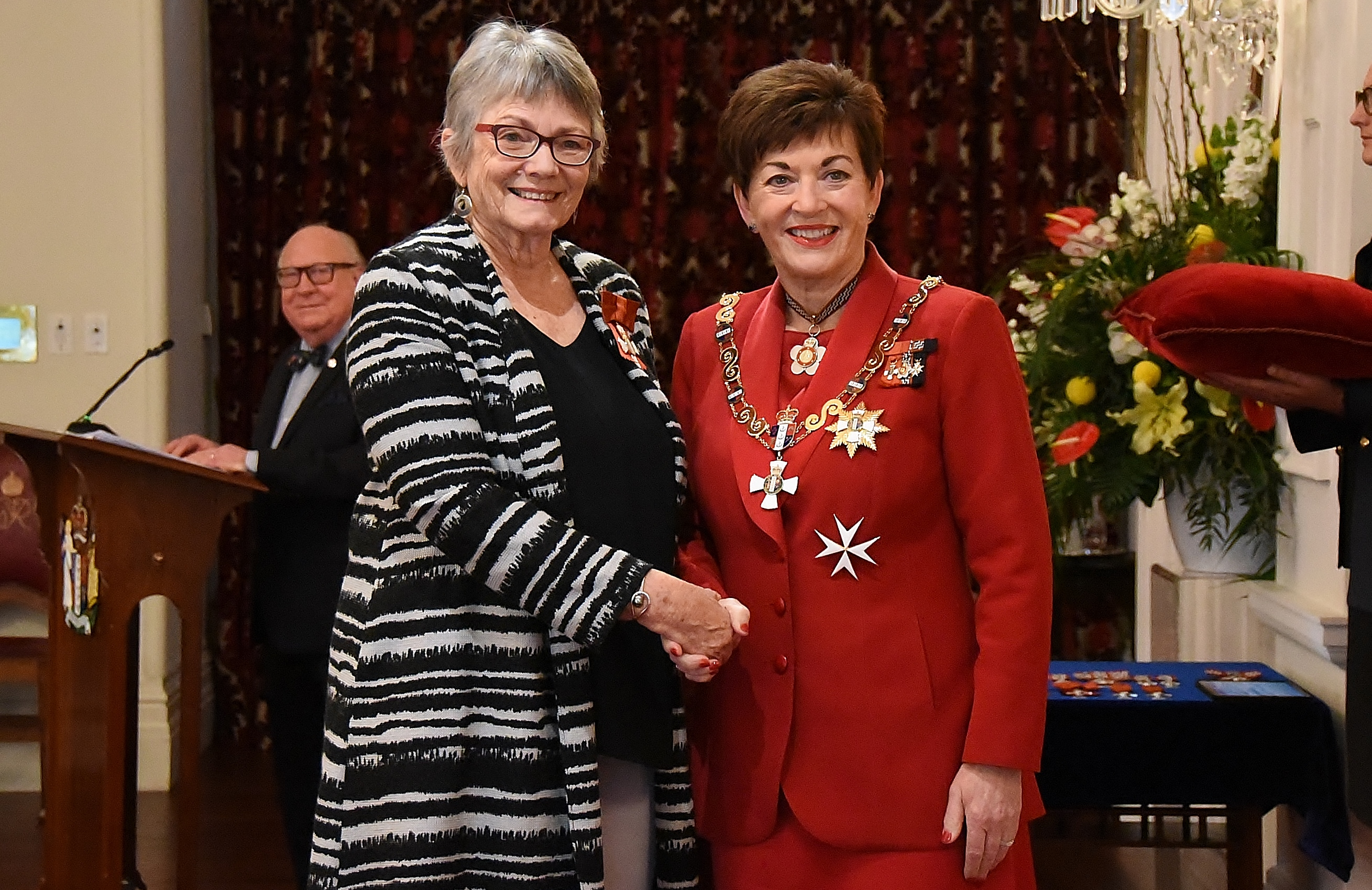
Rhodes (left), after her investiture as a Companion of the New Zealand Order of Merit, by the governor-general, Dame Patsy Reddy, in 2017

Lesley Louise Rhodes CNZM is a New Zealand scientist. She is the co-leader of the Nationally Significant Database programme (NSD) for the Cawthron Institute. In the 2017 Queen's Birthday Honours, she was named as a Companion of the New Zealand Order of Merit in recognition for her contributions to science and marine farming.

== Career ==
Rhodes completed a master's degree in biochemistry at Lincoln University in 1988. Following this she completed a PhD in plant biotechnology at Massey University in 1995.

In 1985 she started work as a scientist for the Cawthron Institute, becoming a senior scientist in 1994.

In 2003 she began the "Safe New Zealand Seafood for Global Consumers" research programme which operated until 2016. Along with establishing the culture collection of microalgae at the Cawthron Institute she has had a significant impact on the management of New Zealand's seafood exports and safety standards.

There is a species of marine phytoplankton, Ostreopsis rhodesae, named after her to recognise her contributions to toxic algae research.

== Selected publications ==
- Wood, S.A.; Rhodes, L.; Lengline, F.; Ponikla. K.; Pochon, X. (2017). "Phylogenetic characterisation of marine Chroococcus-like (Cyanobacteria) strains from the Pacific region." New Zealand Journal of Botany. 55: 5–13
- Rhodes, L.; Smith, K.; Harwood, T.; Bedford, C. (2014). (2014). "Novel and toxin-producing epiphytic dinoflagellates isolated from sub-tropical Raoul Island, Kermadec Islands group." New Zealand Journal of Marine and Freshwater Research 48: 594–599.
- Kohli, G.S.; Papiol, G.G.; Rhodes, L.; Harwood, D.T.; Selwood, A.I.; Jerrett, A.; Murray, S.A.; Neilan, B.A. (2014). "A feeding study to probe the uptake of Maitotoxin by snapper (Pagrus auratus)." Harmful Algae 37: 125–132.
