= George Salmond (public servant) =

New Zealand doctor and public health administrator

George Salmond CNZM
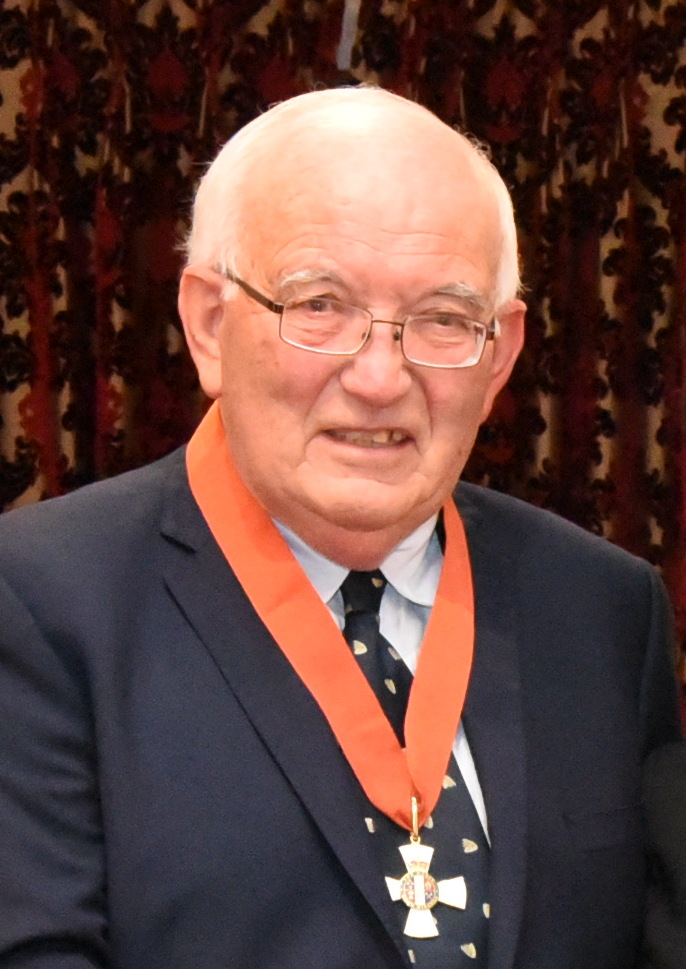
- Salmond in 2017

10th Director-General of Health
- In office March 1986 – May 1991
- Preceded by: Ron Baker
- Succeeded by: Ian Miller

Personal details
- Born: George Cockburn Salmond; 14 October 1937 Stratford, New Zealand
- Died: 2 April 2019 (aged 81) Wellington, New Zealand
- Spouse: Clare Hendtlass (m. 1970)
- Children: 3
- Profession: Medical administrator

Academic background
- Education: University of Otago
- Thesis: "Young doctors": an exercise in social research methodology (1970)

George Cockburn Salmond CNZM (14 October 1937 – 2 April 2019) was a New Zealand doctor and public servant. He was Director-General of Health for five years from 1986 to 1991.

== Early life and family ==
Born in Stratford on 14 October 1937, Salmond was the son of Ivy Emma Salmond (née MacClure) and Robert Carlyle Salmond. He was educated at Hamilton Boys' High School, and went on to study at the University of Otago from 1956 to 1961 and then 1966 to 1971. He graduated MB ChB in 1961, earned a Postgraduate Diploma in Public Health in 1966, and completed a PhD in 1970. The title of his doctoral thesis was "Young doctors": an exercise in social research methodology.

In 1970, Salmond married Clare Elizabeth Hendtlass, a statistician, and the couple went on to have three children.

== Career ==
In 1971, Salmond was employed by the Department of Health as principal health officer. He held that role until 1973 when he became director of the department's management services and research unit. Ten years later he became the Deputy Director-General of Health. On the retirement of Ron Barker in 1986, he was appointed Director-General of Health. Soon after becoming the head of the department, Salmond conducted a restructure of the management structure. In 1987, he led the department in becoming a smoke-free workplace after 86% of staff supported the move. Department employees were no longer allowed to smoke on departmental premises or in departmental vehicles.

Salmond's tenure leading the health system was a time of great reform. Following the Cartwright Inquiry, the Mason inquiry and the Gibbs report into the structure of the health service, the department underwent two major restructurings with district offices and hospital boards being reformed into area health boards. There were significant redundancies in 1989 when departmental staff numbers at the head office in Wellington were cut from 150 to 80. In 1991, Salmond resigned in the face of further cuts and restructuring plans by the Bolger government.

In 1993, Salmond was appointed director of the Health Services Research Centre at Victoria University of Wellington, holding the post until 1999. From the mid-1990s, he was an advocate for reinstating the area health boards and giving local control to aspects of the health system, but cautioned that such a reform would need careful management.

Salmond attended six World Health Assemblies (WHAs) as a member of the New Zealand delegation. He was also involved with the International Physicians for the Prevention of Nuclear War (IPPNW) delegation in Geneva. In 1992, he was involved in an attempt to get the WHA to ask the World Court for clarifications regarding the legal status of nuclear weapons, but failed to win sufficient support. The following year, another attempt was made, again facing strong opposition from nuclear-armed states, but this attempt was successful. The WHA sought an advisory opinion from the World Court. In 1996, the court found that the threat to use, and use of, nuclear weapons except in extreme circumstances were illegal.

From 2000 to 2013, Salmond was the chairman the board of the Blueprint Trust, a private training organisation that provided a range of education and training services, particularly in the mental-health sector.

== Honours and awards ==
in 1990, Salmond received the New Zealand 1990 Commemoration Medal. In 2001, the Public Health Association awarded him the Public Health Champion award for his 40-year involvement in public health. In the 2017 Queen's Birthday Honours, he was appointed a Companion of the New Zealand Order of Merit, for services to health.

Salmond was a Fellow of the Royal Australasian College of Physicians and a Fellow of the Australasian Faculty of Public Health Medicine.

== Death ==
Salmond died at his home in Wellington on 2 April 2019.

Government offices
Preceded by Ron Baker	Director-General of Health; 1986–1991	Succeeded by Ian Miller
