= Claire Reilly =

New Zealand motor neuron disease activist

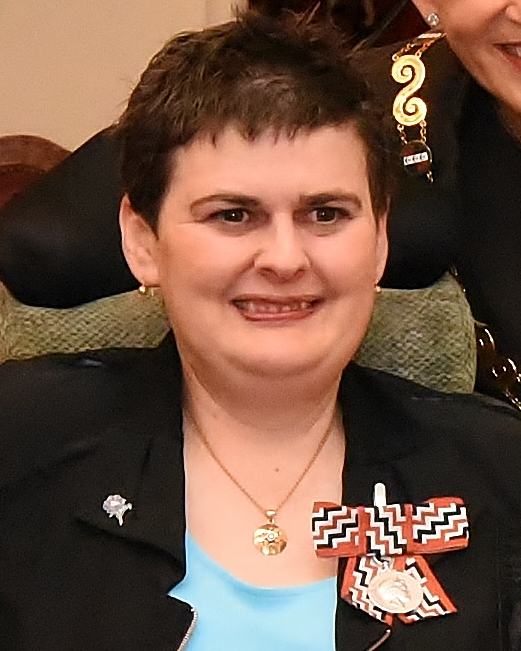
Reilly in 2017

Claire Aileen Reilly QSM is a New Zealand advocate for the motor neuron disease community and research. Qualified as a medical doctor, she was diagnosed with motor neuron disease (MND) in 2006. Reilly was awarded the Queen's Service Medal in 2017.

== Illness and career ==
Reilly grew up on the West Coast of the South Island of New Zealand, moving to Alexandra in her teenage years. Reilly completed her medical training at the University of Otago in 1997.

In 2006, when working as a doctor in a hospital in Melbourne, Reilly developed symptoms including tripping, difficulty with a button and muscle wasting in her hand, and was diagnosed with amyotrophic lateral sclerosis (ALS), or MND. She was 32 years of age when diagnosed, and returned to New Zealand after the diagnosis.

Within six months of diagnosis, Reilly was in a wheelchair. In 2015 she reported being unable to walk and needing help to shower, turn in bed and eat. At that time, she was using a machine at night to help her breathe and her speech was slurred. In 2017, at the age of 43 years, she said she considered herself lucky to have lived with MND for ten years, given the typically short life span.

Reilly worked for Motor Neurone Disease New Zealand from 2015 to 2022, as Fundraising Development Manager and later as Community and Research Advisor. She encouraged the organisation to support research and to establish the Motor Neurone Disease New Zealand Research Fund in 2015.

Reilly conceived and implemented the idea for Walk 2 D'Feet MND fundraising events with 14 walks all over New Zealand to raise funds for research, raising awareness through interviews with Seven Sharp and Women's Day.

Reilly was key in establishing the New Zealand Motor Neurone Disease Registry launched 22 May 2017 and funded by Motor Neurone Disease NZ. This registry holds data for patients and people with a familial MND gene mutation and helps with recruiting patients into clinical trials and allows the collection of data about how MND affects people in New Zealand.

Reilly's research advocacy extended to helping set up a MND Research Network, bringing a phase 3 MND clinical trial to New Zealand, running and speaking at a MND Research Update in NZ in 2019, writing the MND Research Strategy 2019–2022, and presenting on the NZ Research Strategy at the Australia and New Zealand MND Research Symposium in 2022.

Reilly was behind the 2019 MND Hui which brought together health professionals, MND NZ staff, representatives of District Health Boards and Members of Parliament to discuss ways to standardise care for people living with MND. This led to establishing the Motor Neurone Disease Clinical Working Group, co-chaired by Reilly, to develop standardised guidelines for care of people with MND. Reilly led the work on the Best Practice Recommendations for the Care of People with Motor Neurone Disease in New Zealand, published in 2022.

== Honours and awards ==
In the 2017 Queen's Birthday Honours, Reilly was awarded he Queen's Service Medal, for services to people with motor neurone disease. The citation stated:

"Dr Reilly's advocacy for research into the disease encouraged MND NZ to extend its vision beyond support to people living with MND to actively supporting research in New Zealand."

== Selected works ==
- Walker, Kerry L.; Rodrigues, Miriam J.; Watson, Beth; Reilly, Claire; Scotter, Emma L.; Brunton, Heather; Turnbull, Janet; Roxburgh, Richard H. (2019). "Establishment and 12-month progress of the New Zealand Motor Neurone Disease Registry". Journal of Clinical Neuroscience. 60: 7–11. doi:10.1016/j.jocn.2018.11.034. PMID 30473407.
