= 2017 Birthday Honours (New Zealand) =

Awards list for New Zealand

2017 Queen's Birthday Honours
- Previous: 2017 New Year Honours; Next: 2018 New Year Honours
- Type: New Zealand royal honours: New Zealand Order of Merit; Queen's Service Order; Queen's Service Medal; New Zealand Antarctic Medal; Distinguished Service Decoration
- Date: 5 June 2017
- Country: New Zealand
- Total recipients: 186

The 2017 Queen's Birthday Honours in New Zealand, celebrating the official birthday of Queen Elizabeth II, were appointments made by the Queen in her right as Queen of New Zealand, on the advice of the New Zealand government, to various orders and honours to reward and highlight good works by New Zealanders. They were announced on 5 June 2017.

The recipients of honours are listed here as they were styled before their new honour.

== New Zealand Order of Merit ==
=== Knight Grand Companion (GNZM) ===
- The Right Honourable John Phillip Key – of Auckland. For services to the State.
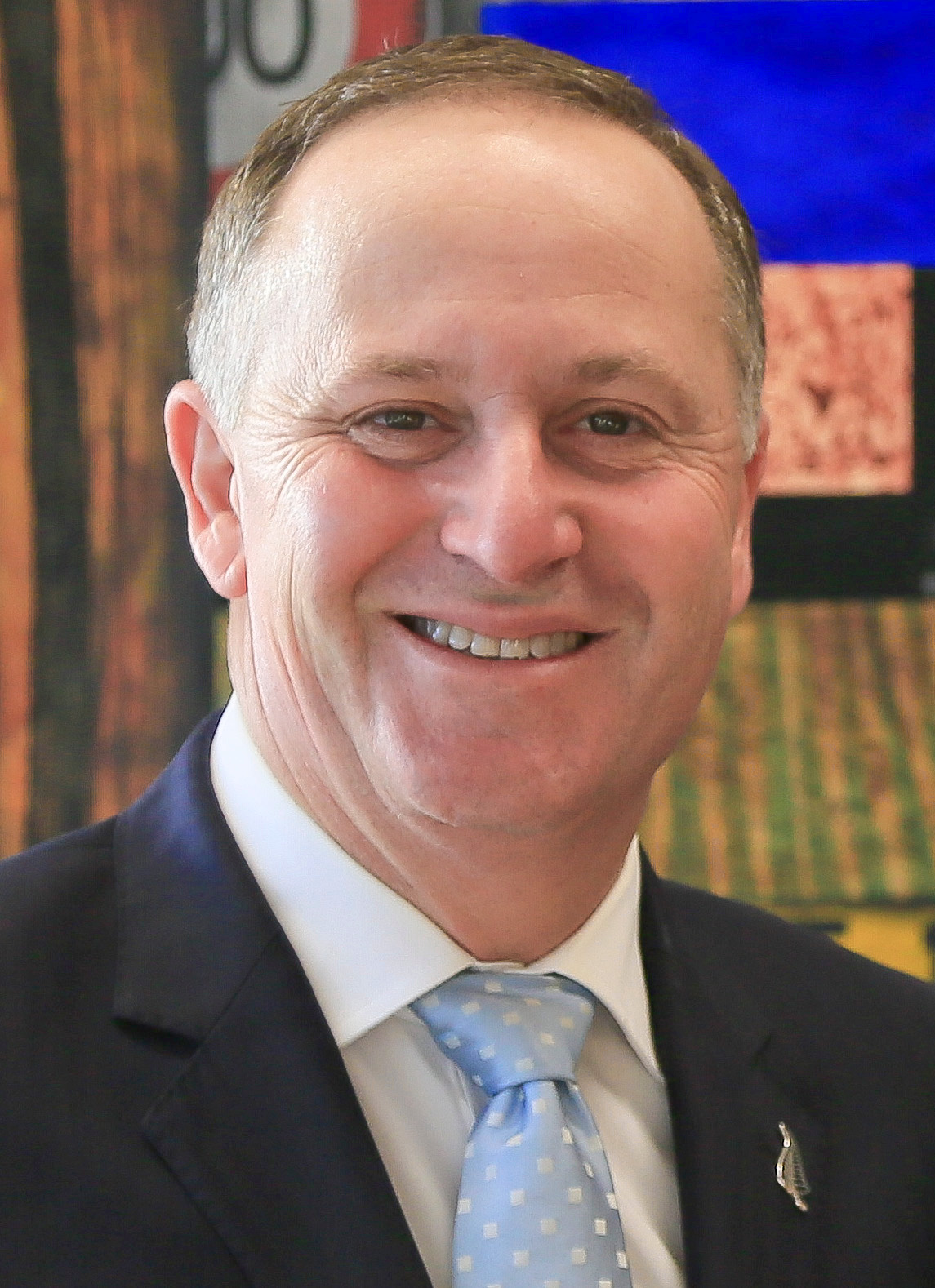
Sir John Key

=== Dame Companion (DNZM) ===
- Julie Claire Molloy Christie ONZM – of Auckland. For services to governance and the television industry.
- Emeritus Professor Peggy Gwendoline Koopman-Boyden CNZM – of Hamilton. For services to seniors.
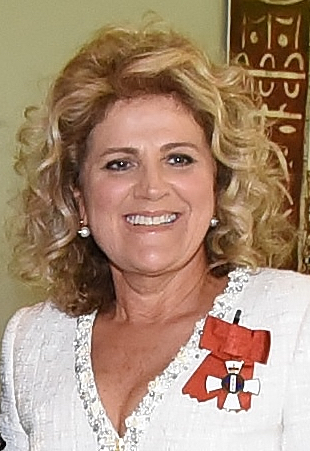
Dame Julie Christie

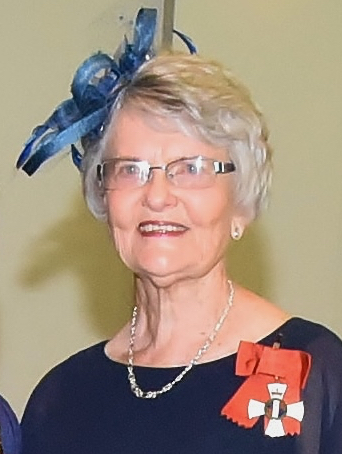
Dame Peggy Koopman-Boyden

=== Knight Companion (KNZM) ===
- Graeme Dingle ONZM MBE – of Auckland. For services to youth.
- Michael Niko Jones MNZM – of Auckland. For services to the Pacific community and youth.
- Professor Tīmoti Samuel Kāretu QSO – of Havelock North. For services to the Māori language.
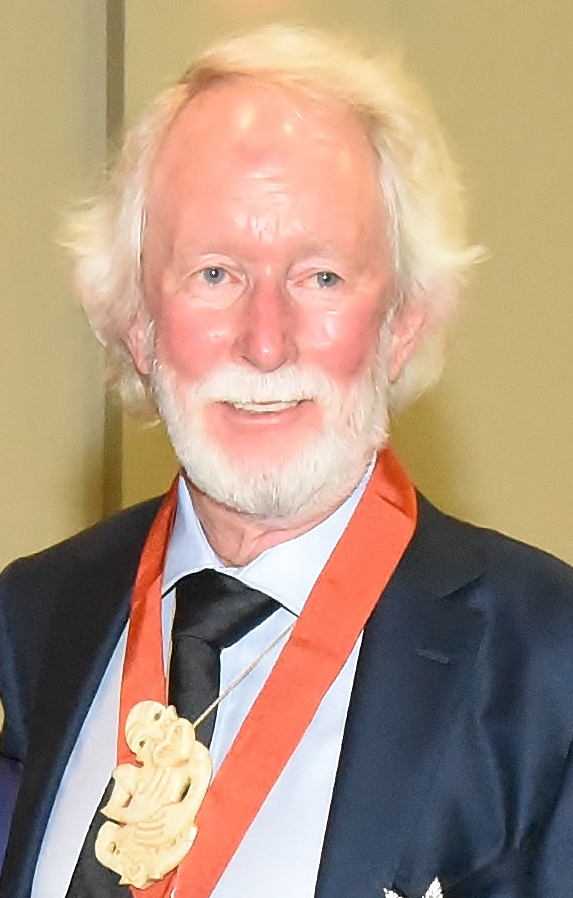
Sir Graeme Dingle

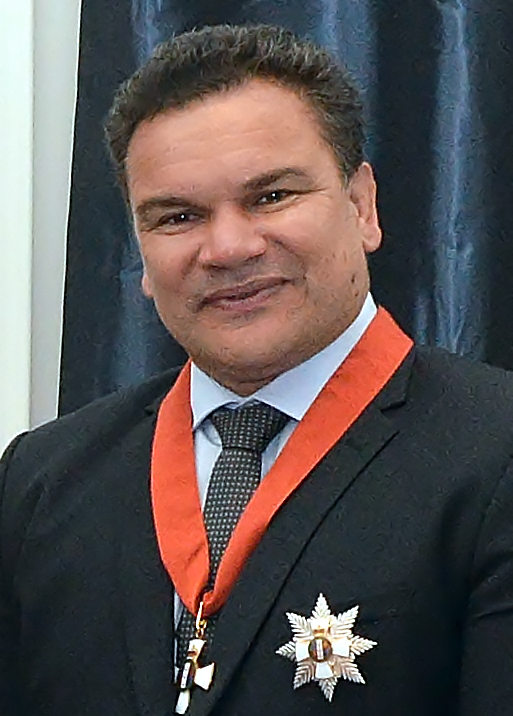
Sir Michael Jones

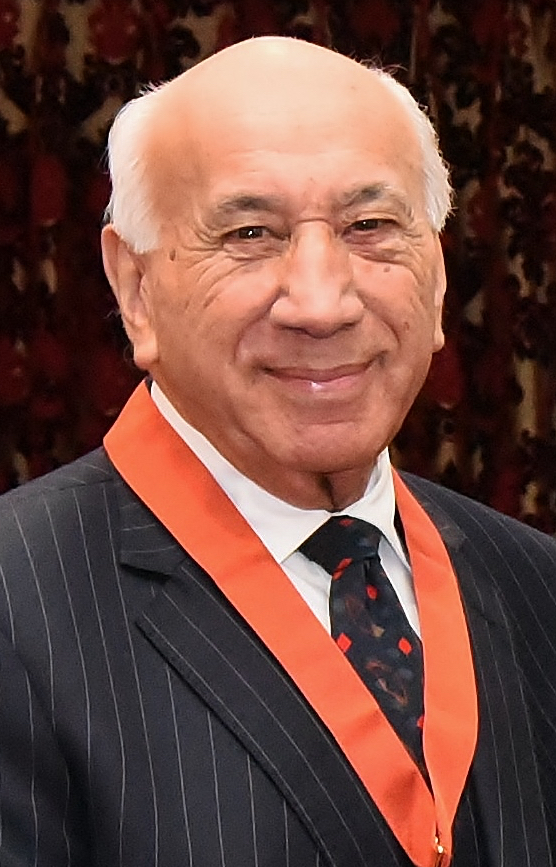
Sir Tīmoti Kāretu

=== Companion (CNZM) ===
- Mary Tupai Ama – of Auckland. For services to the arts and the Pacific community.
- The Honourable James Patrick Anderton – of Christchurch. For services as a member of parliament.
- Roy James Austin – of Auckland. For services to children's health and the community.
- Peter Kerry Clark OBE – of Auckland. For services to bowls.
- Candis Eileen Craven ONZM – of Auckland. For services to ballet and business.
- Angus Lindsay Fergusson – of Auckland. For services to governance.
- Professor Peter John Gilling – of Tauranga. For services to urology.
- Anthony John Hall MNZM – of Kaiapoi. For services to education and sport.
- Professor Richie Graham Poulton – of Dunedin. For services to science and health research.
- Lynette Diana Provost – of Upper Hutt. For services to the State.
- Lesley Louise Rhodes – of Nelson. For services to science and marine farming.
- George Cockburn Salmond – of Wellington. For services to health.
- Maxine Helen Simmons – of Auckland. For services to science, particularly biotechnology.
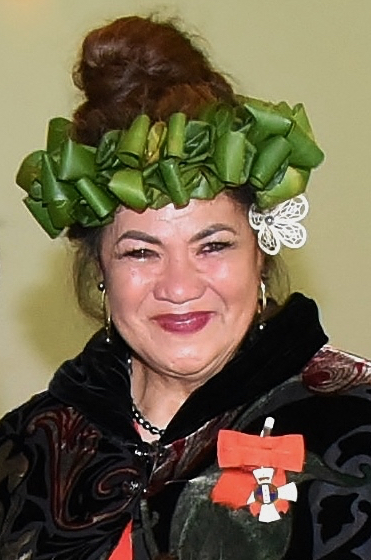
Mary Ama

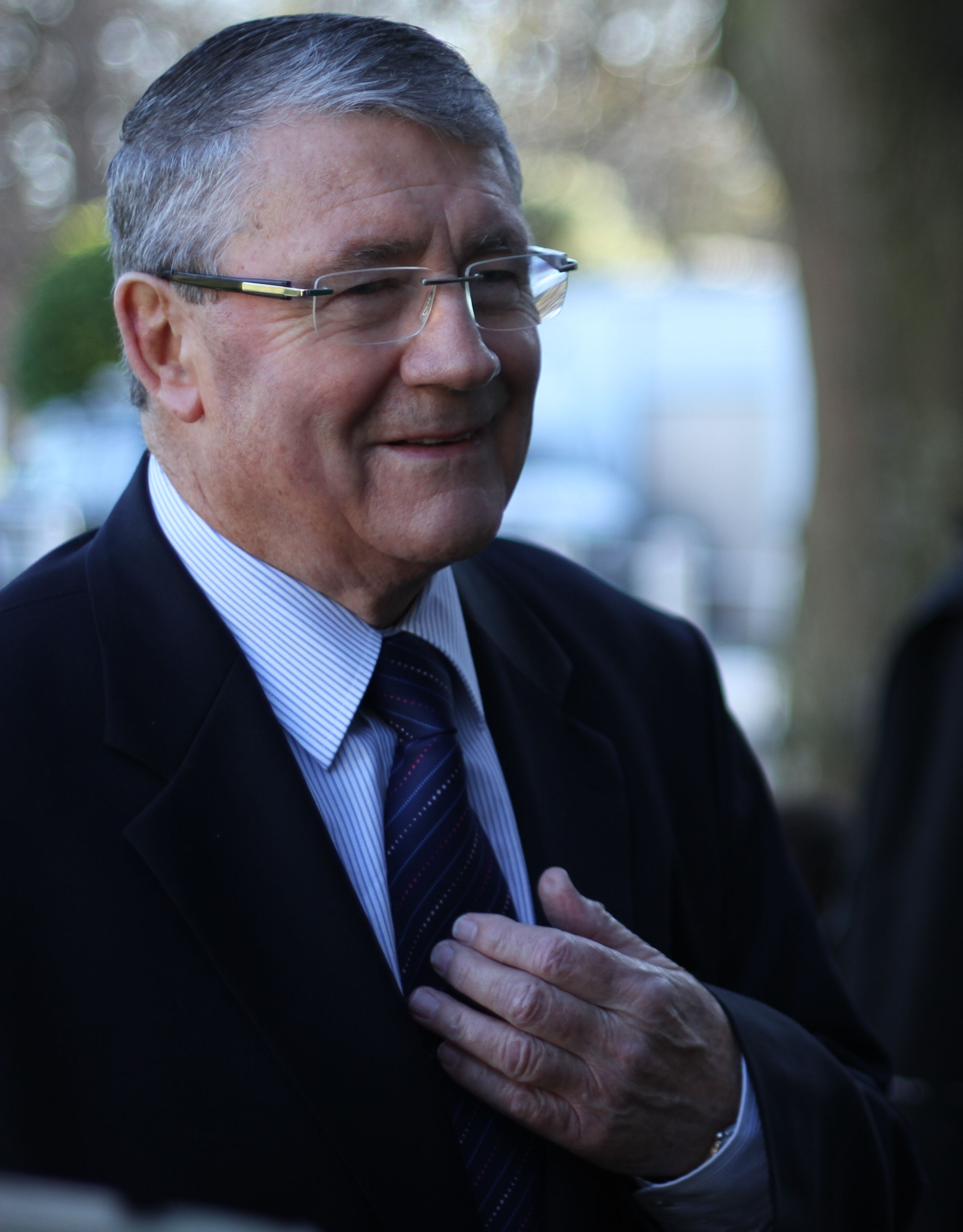
Jim Anderton

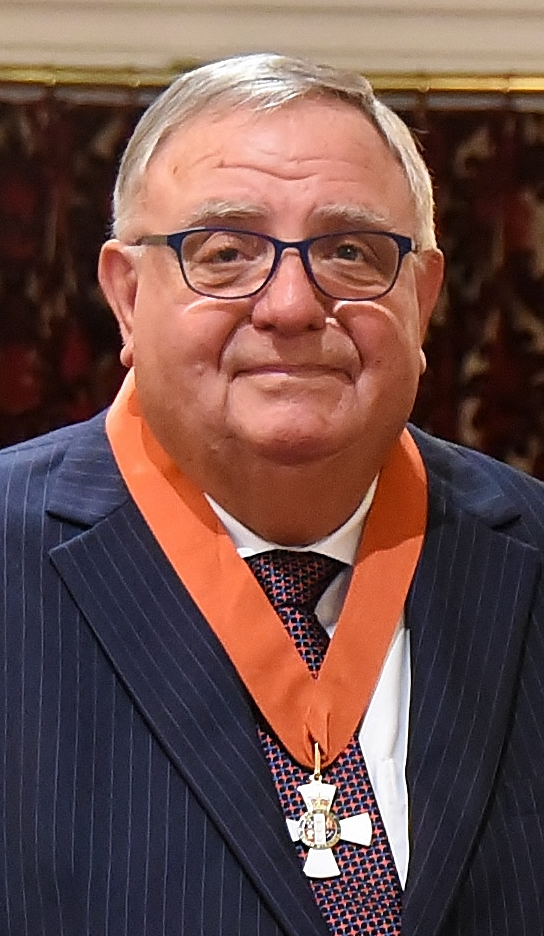
Kerry Clark

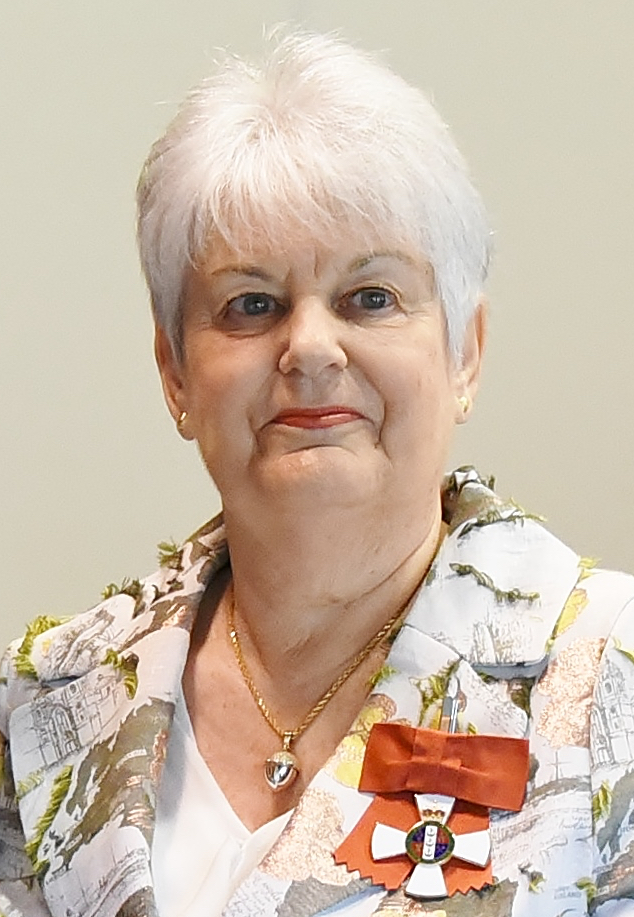
Candis Craven

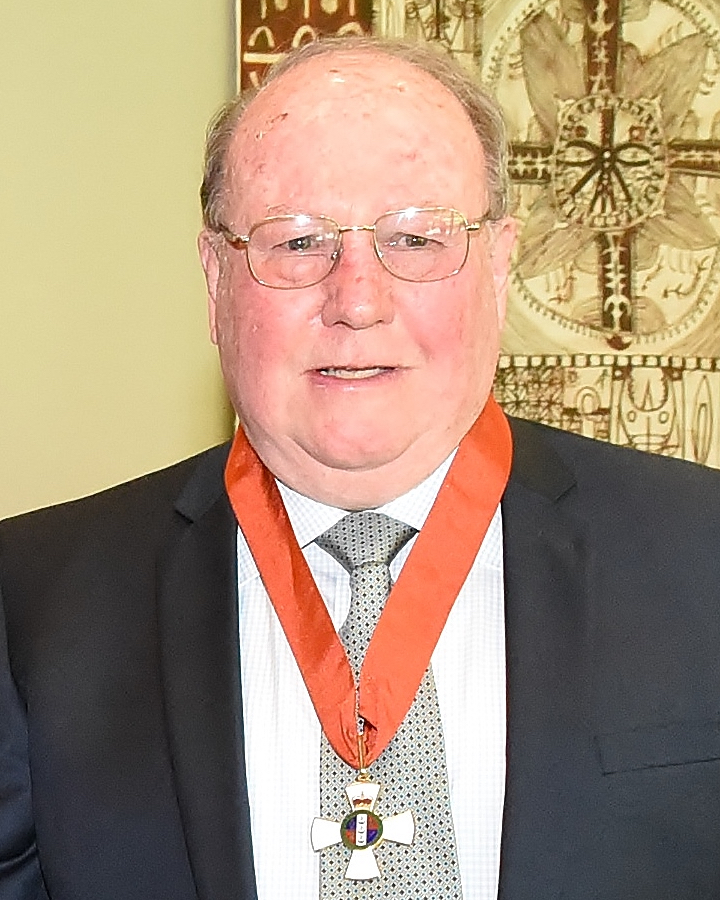
Lindsay Fergusson

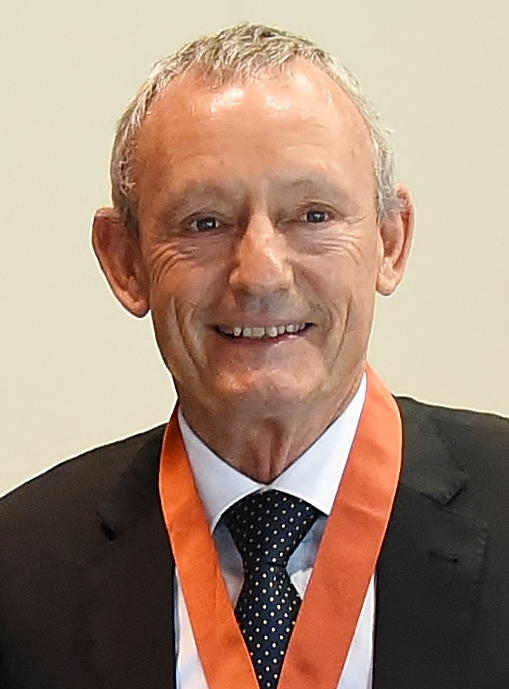
Tony Hall

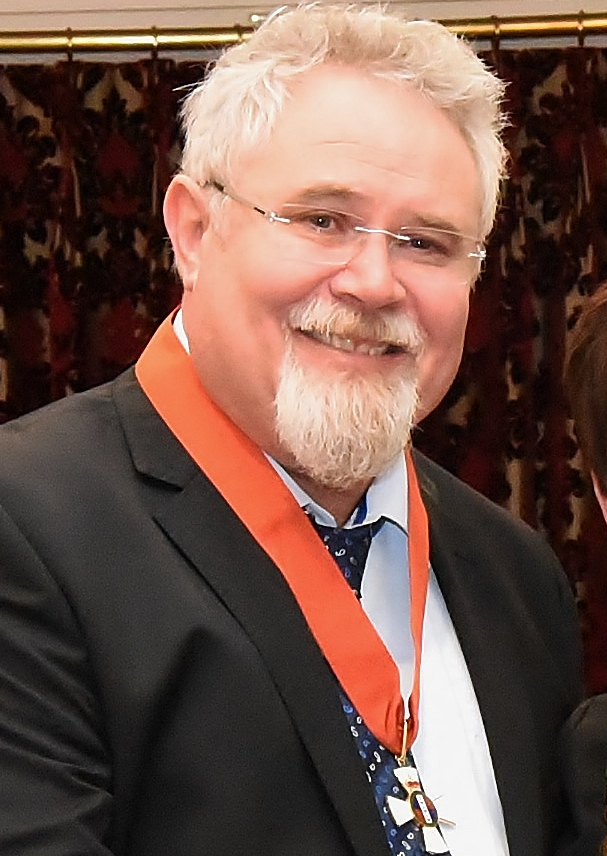
Richie Poulton

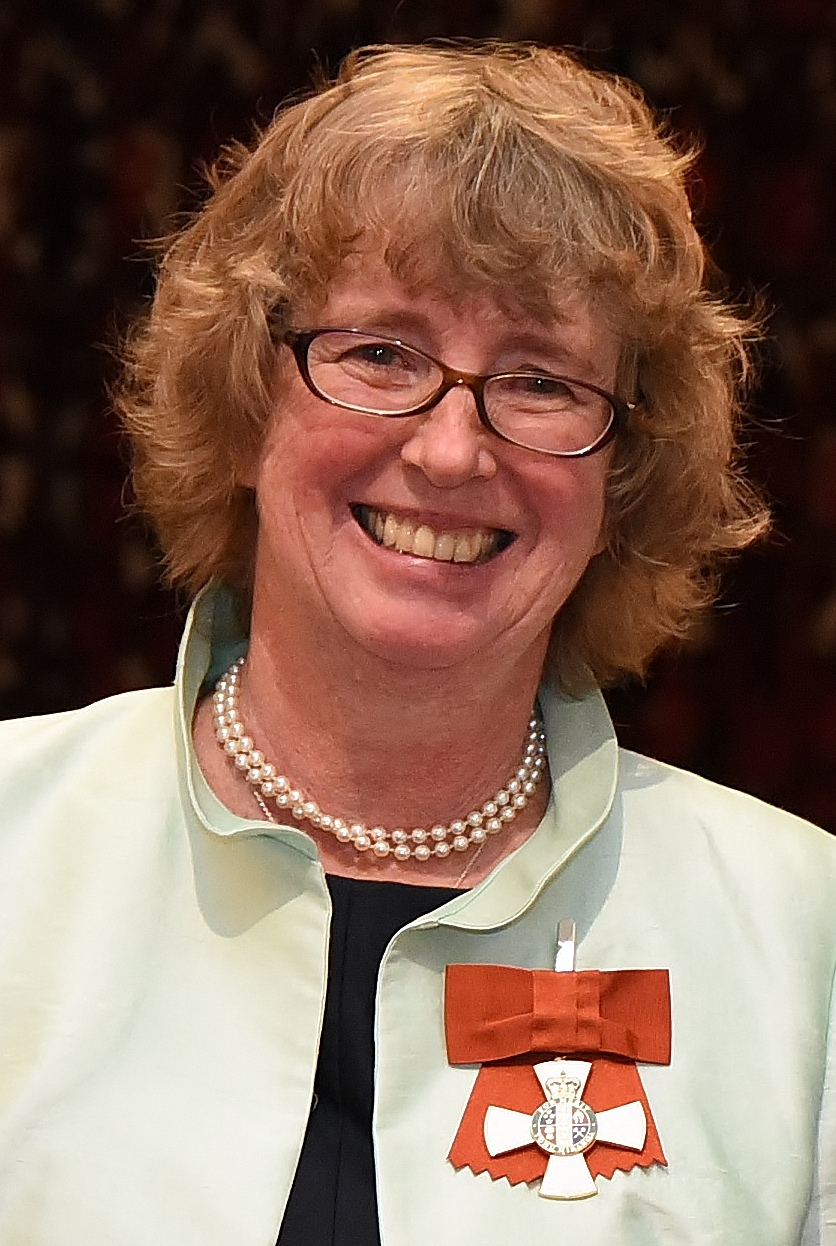
Lyn Provost

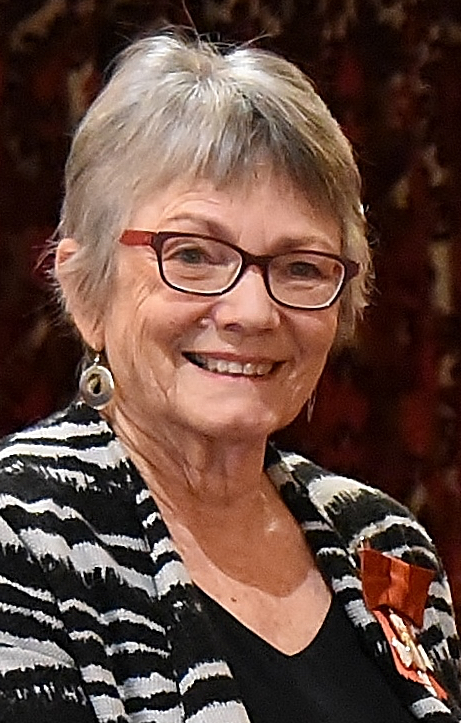
Lesley Rhodes

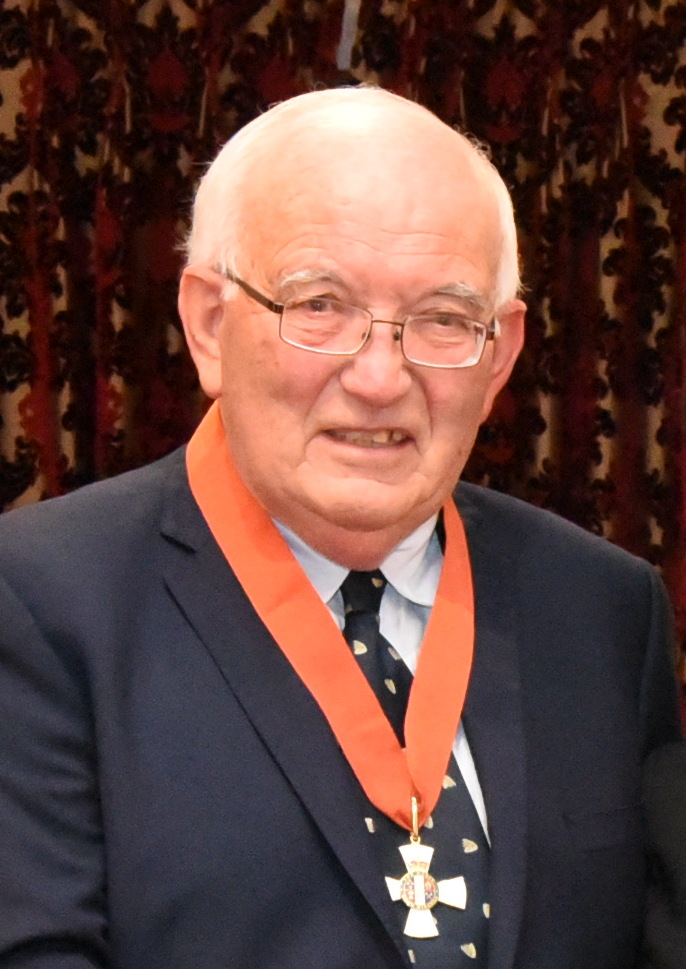
George Salmond

=== Officer (ONZM) ===
- Desmond Albert Ashton – of Blenheim. For services to the New Zealand Defence Force and aviation.
- Professor Anne Victoria Cameron – of Christchurch. For services to health.
- David Michael Chamley – of Auckland. For services to anaesthesia.
- Avon Cook – of Auckland. For services to the manufacturing industry.
- Brendan Joseph Duffy – of Levin. For services to local government.
- William Robert Dunbar – of Cromwell. For services to health and the community.
- Susanne Patricia Edwards – of Picton. For services to synchronised swimming.
- Craig Clifford Emeny – of the Chatham Islands. For services to aviation and the community.
- Allan Raymond Fenwick – of Marton. For services to the thoroughbred racing industry.
- Professor Philippa Helen Gander – of Porirua. For services to the study of sleep and fatigue.
- Wahiao Raymond James Gray JP – of Rotorua. For services to Māori and governance.
- Allan John Hackett – of Christchurch. For services to adventure tourism.
- Mark Selwyn Hadlow – of Martinborough. For services to the arts.
- Assistant Commissioner Wallace Patrick Haumaha QSM – of Wellington. For services to the New Zealand Police and Māori, Pacific and ethnic communities.
- David Thomas Higgins – of Palmerston. For services to Māori.
- Ruruarau Heitia Hiha JP – of Napier. For services to Māori.
- Rachel Jessica Te Ao Maarama House – of Auckland. For services to the performing arts.
- Peter Guy Hughes – of Auckland. For services to mathematics education.
- Susan Mary Huria – of Auckland. For services to governance.
- Professor Hamid Ikram – of Christchurch. For services to cardiology and education.
- Zafer Khouri – of Hamilton. For services to odontology.
- Wendy Elizabeth McGowan – of Rotorua. For services to rural women.
- Caroline Harriette Eliza Milne – of Kawakawa. For services to Māori and health.
- Simon John O'Neill – of Auckland. For services to opera.
- Lynda Jean Reid – of Auckland. For services to education.
- Geoffrey Maxwell Robinson – of Lower Hutt. For services to medicine.
- Graeme James Steel – of Auckland. For services to sport.
- Geoffrey Alan Whitcher – of Auckland. For services to business and education.
- Deborah Mary White – of Auckland. For services to art.
- Frances Wilson-Fitzgerald – of Auckland. For services to opera.

Honorary

- Jane Marina Bruning – of Auckland. For services to people with HIV.
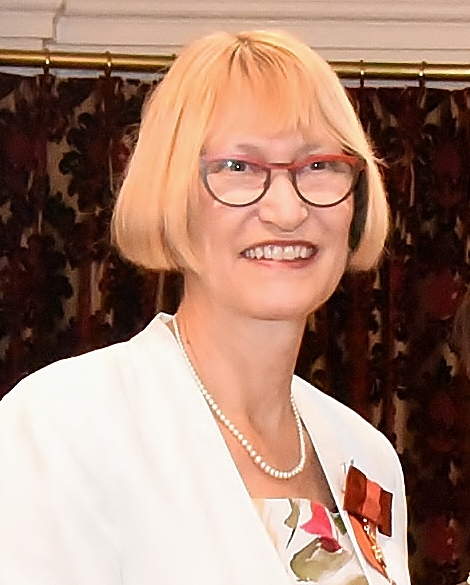
Vicky Cameron

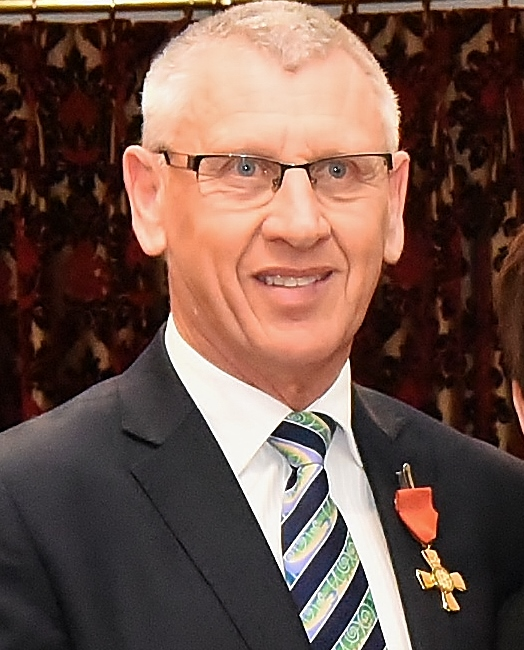
Brendan Duffy

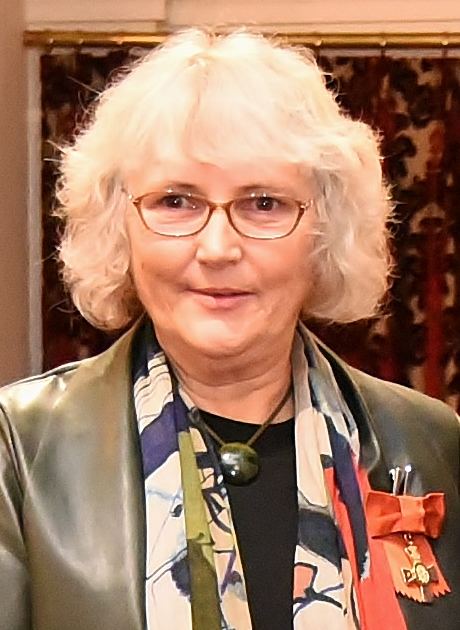
Philippa Gander

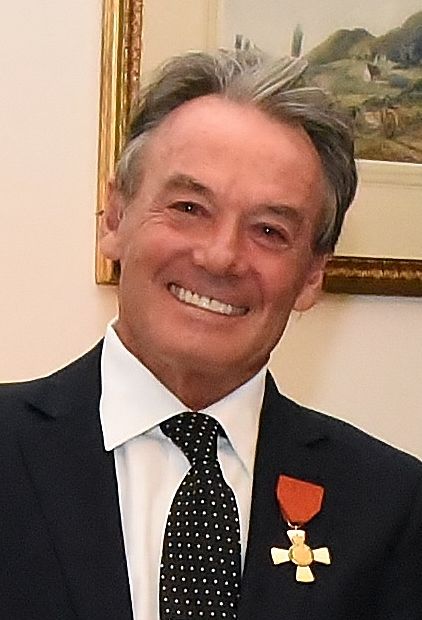
A.J. Hackett

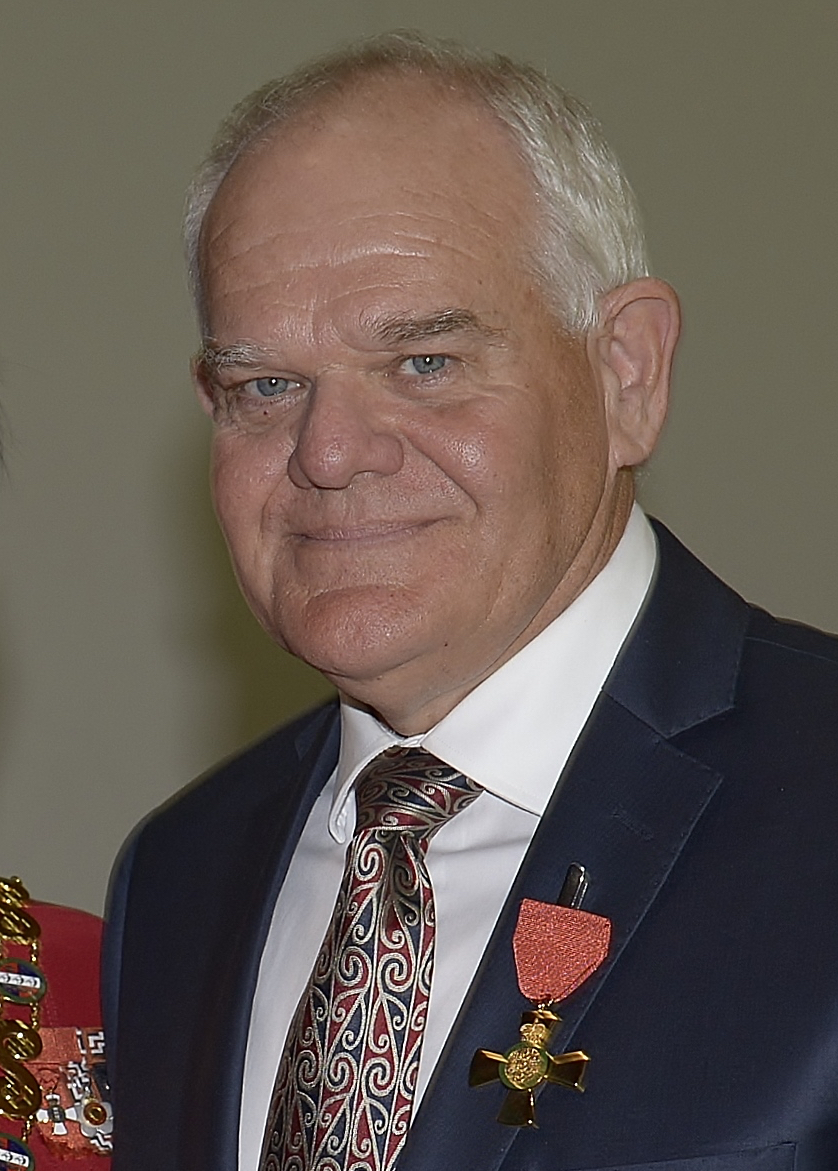
Mark Hadlow

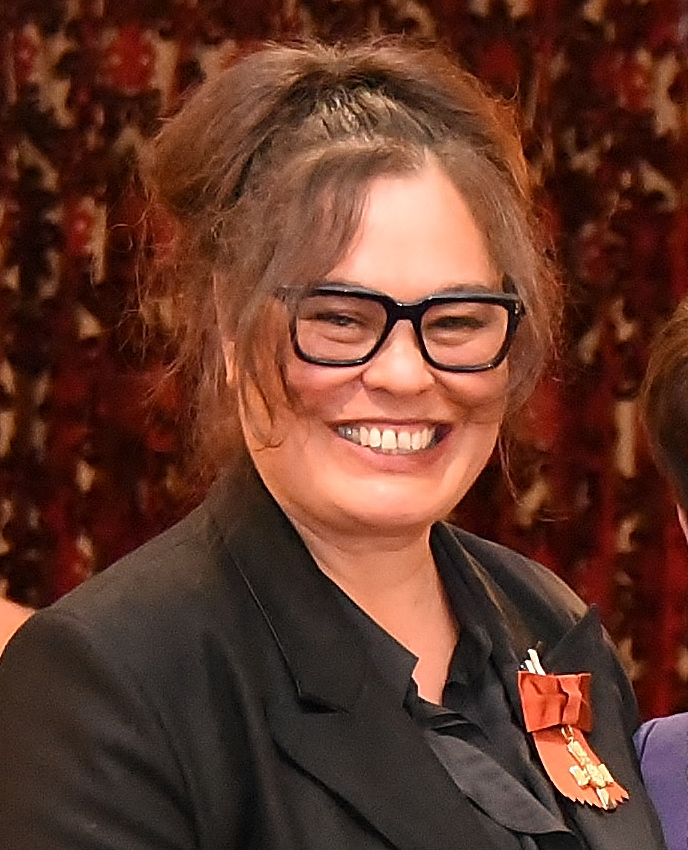
Rachel House

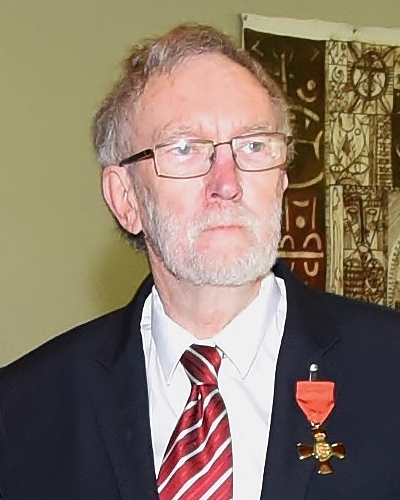
Peter Hughes

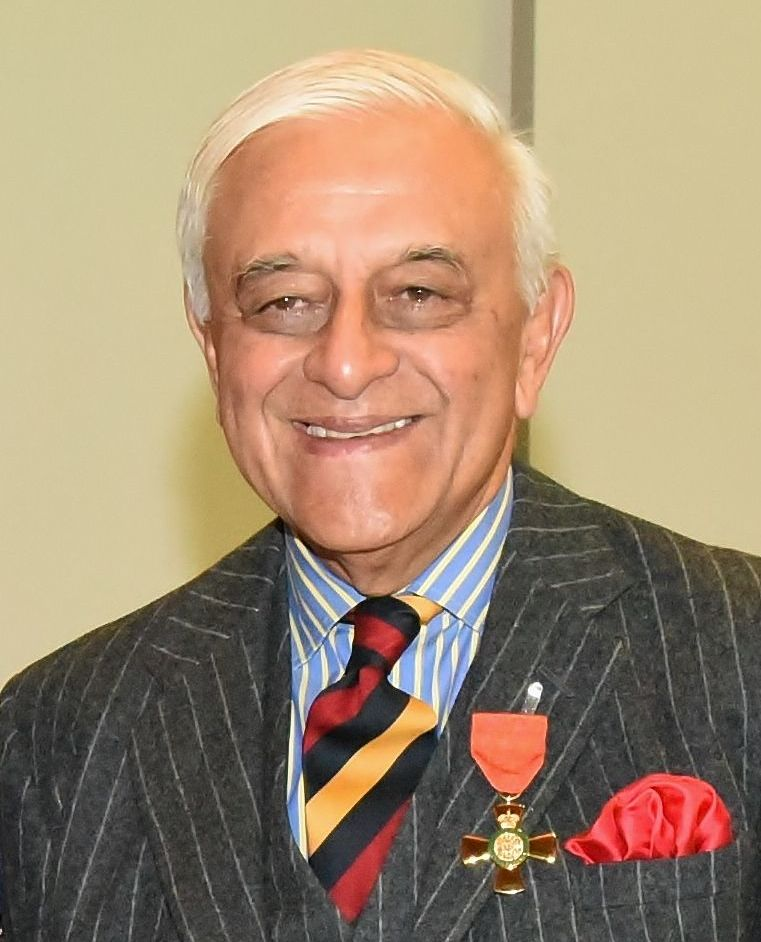
Hamid Ikram

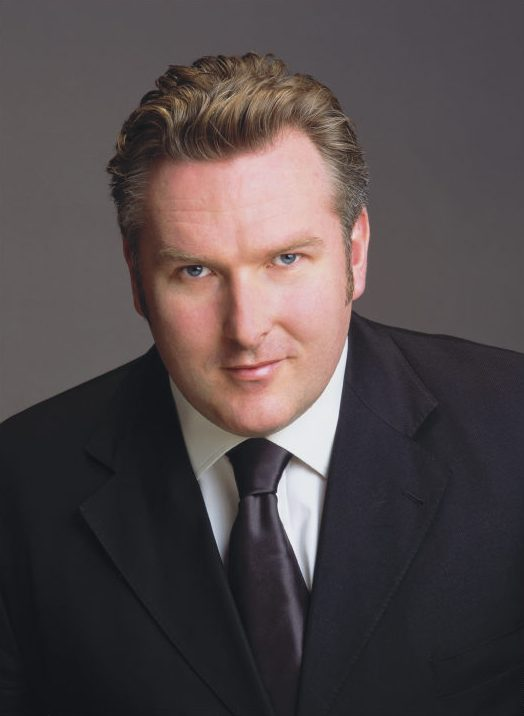
Simon O'Neill

=== Member (MNZM) ===
- Ross Alexander Aitken – of Auckland. For services to conservation.
- Kevin Russell Allen – of Tauranga. For services to people with brain injuries.
- Douglas Graham Avery – of Seddon. For services to agriculture and mental health.
- Janis Irene Ballantyne – of Te Awamutu. For services to education and the community.
- Jacqueline Marie Barron – of Dunedin. For services to sports governance and education.
- Lilian Jeanne Biddulph – of Hamilton. For services to literacy education.
- Pembroke Peraniko Bird QSM – of Murupara. For services to education and Māori.
- Professor Sally Anne Brooker – of Dunedin. For services to science.
- Cranwell Leslie Bull – of Christchurch. For services to cricket.
- Deborah Bush QSM – of Christchurch. For services to women's health.
- Stephen Edward Canny – of Invercargill. For services to the community, governance and cycling.
- David Joseph Comber – of Taupō. For services to Search and Rescue.
- Marilyn Elaine Cooper – of Hamilton. For services to equestrian sports.
- Hamish Angus Crooks – of Auckland. For services to the Pacific community.
- Anne Crummer – of Auckland. For services to music.
- Sharyn Estelle Evans – of Wellington. For services to music.
- Anne Lillian Farrington JP – of Auckland. For services to women.
- William Thomas Gray QSM JP – of Tolaga Bay. For services to Māori and the community.
- Timothy Michael Gresson – of Timaru. For services to the law and sport.
- James Alastair Hay Guild – of Darfield. For services to the deer industry.
- Ray Kenway Haffenden – of Auckland. For services to rugby league.
- Shane Paul Arthur Hales – of Auckland. For services to entertainment.
- Peter John Hayden – of Dunedin. For services to film and television.
- Emeritus Professor John Bernard Hearnshaw – of Christchurch. For services to astronomy.
- Inspector Karen Lee Henrikson – of Hamilton. For services to the New Zealand Police and the community.
- Sally Tupetalamataone Ikinofo – of Auckland. For services to education and Māori and Pacific communities.
- Associate Professor Robert John Jacobs – of Auckland. For services to optometry and education.
- Graham Russell Kennedy – of Ashburton. For services to business.
- Rebecca Louise Keoghan – of Westport. For services to business, particularly the dairy industry.
- Robert Akhtar Zainal Khan – of Auckland. For services to broadcasting and the Indian community.
- Rachel Alison Mary Lang – of Auckland. For services to television.
- Elaine Joy Le Sueur – of Auckland. For services to education.
- Peter Hughes MacGregor – of Hastings. For services to Māori and agriculture.
- John Barry Maughan – of Hamilton. For services to health.
- Dennis Graham May – of Auckland. For services to karate.
- Dr Jill Alice McIlraith – of Dunedin. For services to health and women.
- Maurice William McKendry – of Auckland. For services to harness racing.
- Allen John McLaughlin – of Auckland. For services to sports broadcasting.
- Robin Gustav McNeill – of Invercargill. For services to conservation.
- Mereford Michael Meredith – of Auckland. For services as a restaurateur and to philanthropy.
- Te Kei O Te Waka Wilson Merito – of Rotorua. For services to Māori and conservation.
- Peter Charles Morrison – of Christchurch. For services to the hospitality industry.
- Rhonda Marama Mullen-Tamati – of Tīrau. For services to people with HIV and AIDS.
- Thomas Vincent O'Connor – of Invercargill. For services to boxing.
- Albert Emil Osborne – of Tauranga. For services to veterans and biosecurity.
- Dr Fiona Dorothy Pardington – of Auckland. For services to photography.
- lan Rodney Parris – of Christchurch. For services to mathematical education.
- Emily Justine Perkins – of Wellington. For services to literature.
- Nicholas Brian Pyke – of Rolleston. For services to the arable industry.
- Lee Michael Christopher Robinson – of Christchurch. For services to the community and sport.
- John Roy-Wojciechowski – of Auckland. For services to the Polish community and philanthropy.
- Judith Fay Russell – of Whitianga. For services to netball.
- Allan Ross Scarlett – of Karamea. For services to local government and the dairy industry.
- Patrick Nesbit Snedden – of Auckland. For services to education and Māori.
- Murray Ross Sutherland – of Kaiapoi. For services to the community and the timber industry.
- Toro Edward Reginald Waaka – of Napier. For services to Māori and the community.
- Linda Gloria Webb – of Christchurch. For services to music education.
- Professor Karen Elizabeth Willcox – of Somerville, Massachusetts, United States of America. For services to aerospace engineering and education.
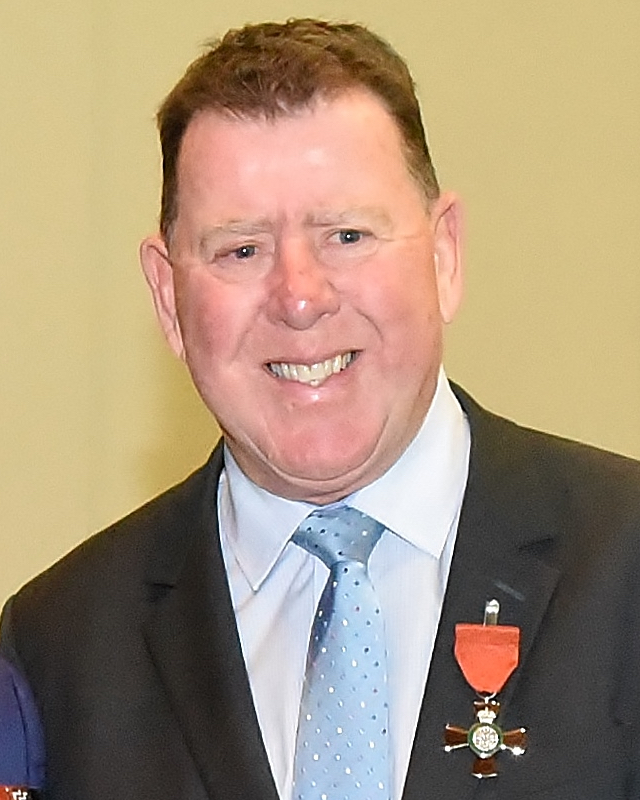
Kevin Allen

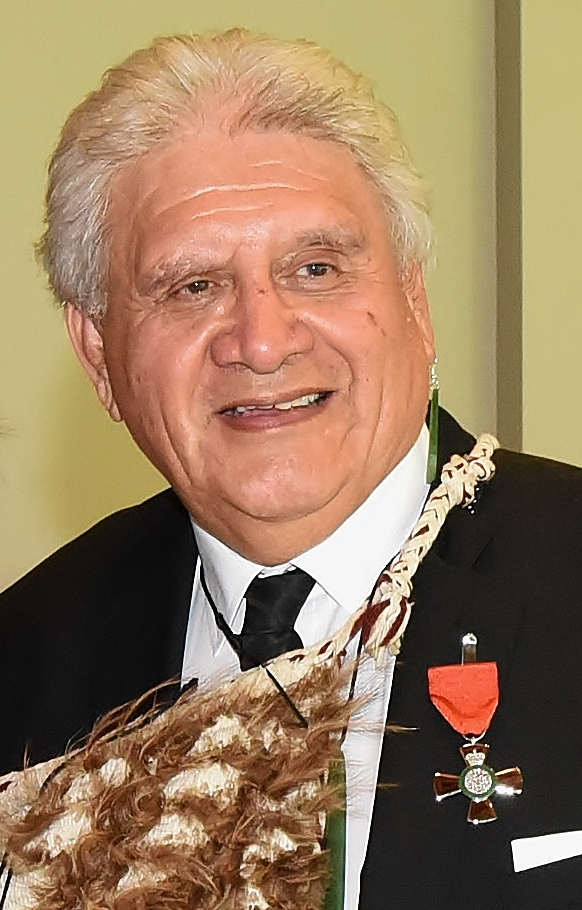
Pem Bird

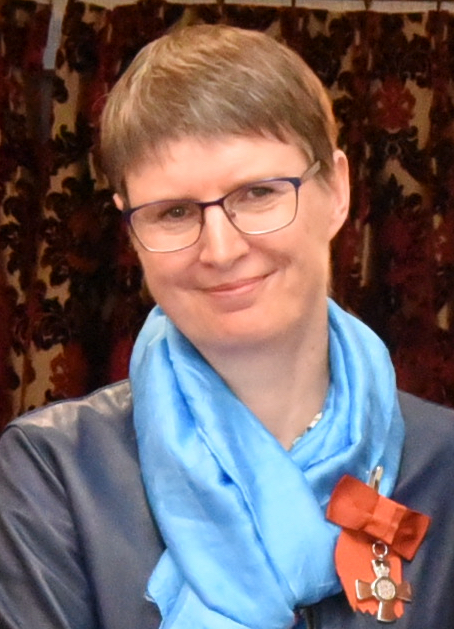
Sally Brooker

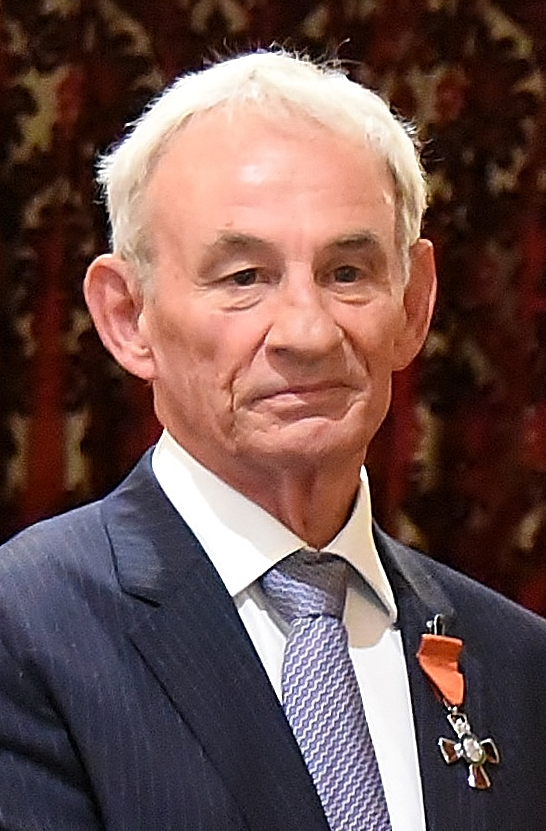
Cran Bull

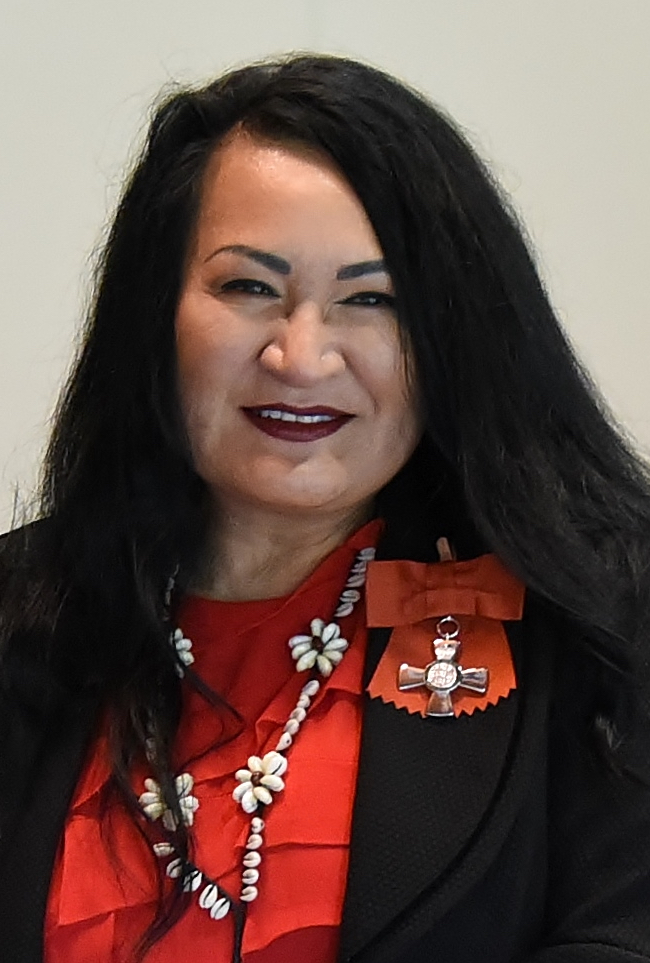
Annie Crummer

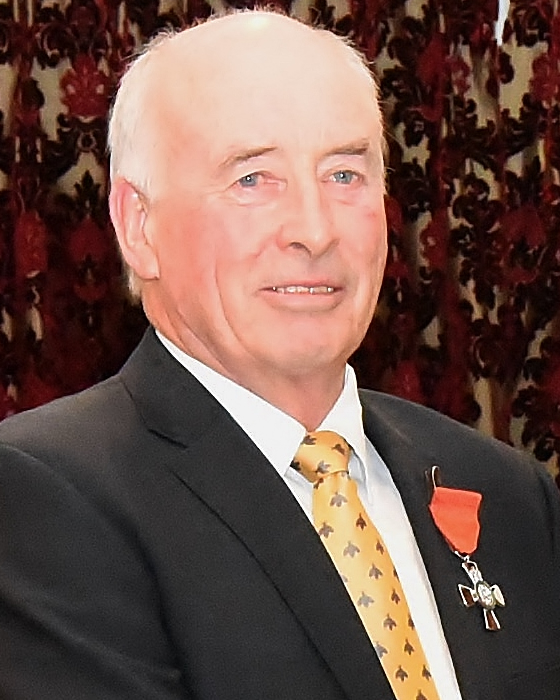
James Guild

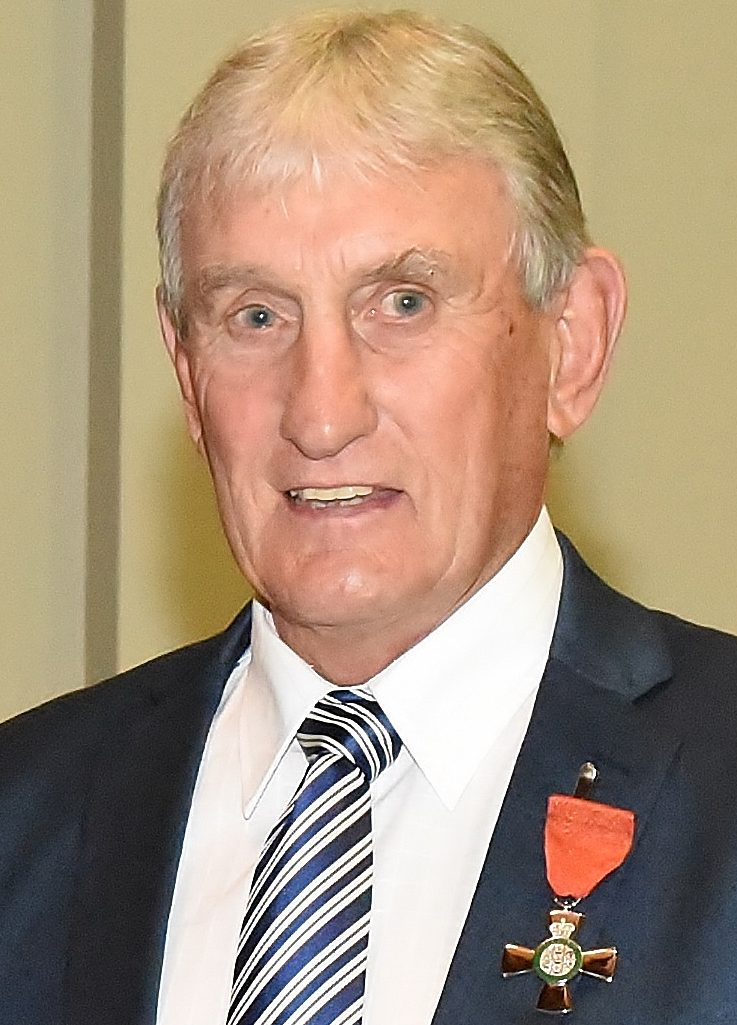
Ray Haffenden

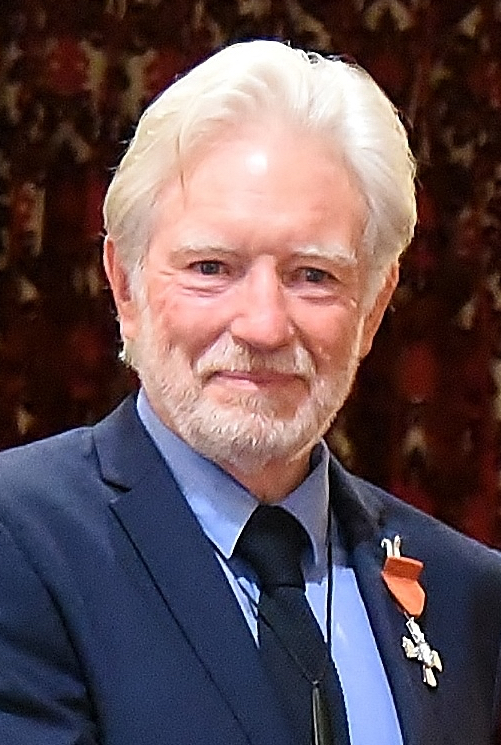
Peter Hayden

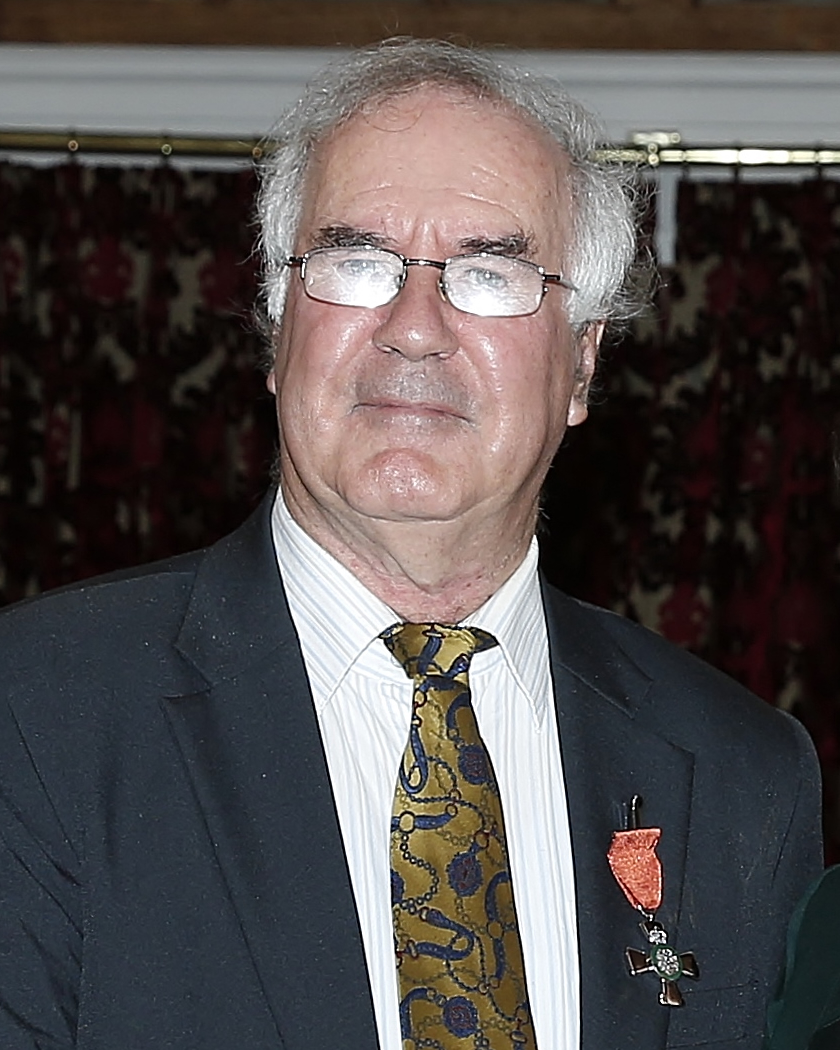
John Hearnshaw

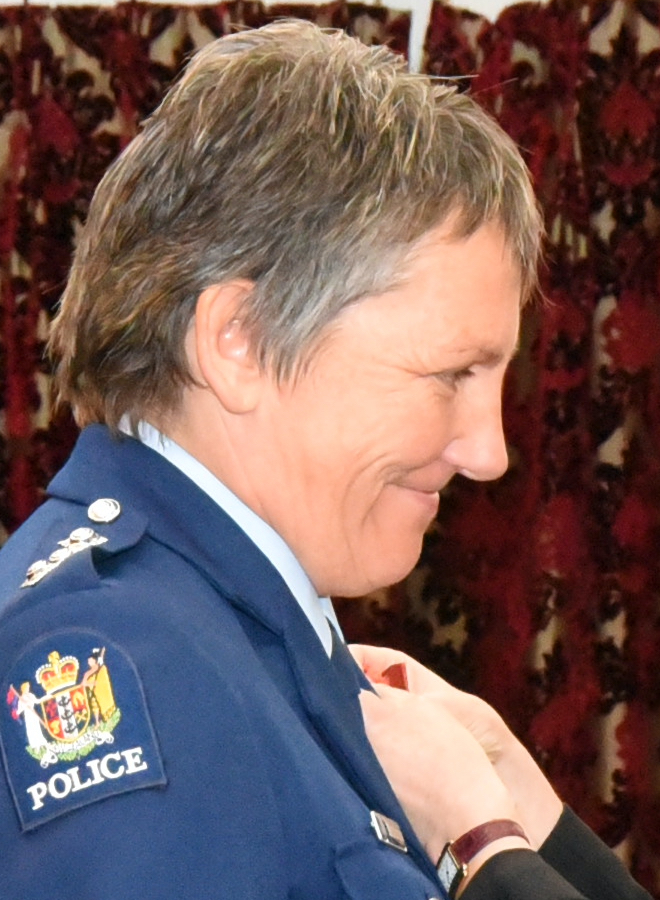
Karen Henrikson

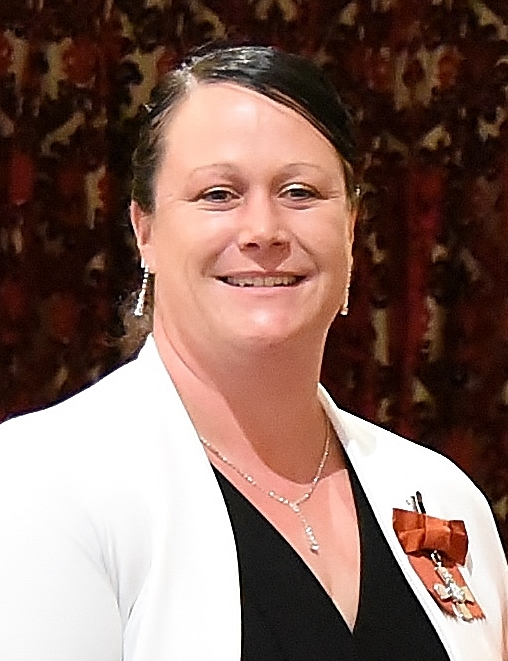
Rebecca Keoghan

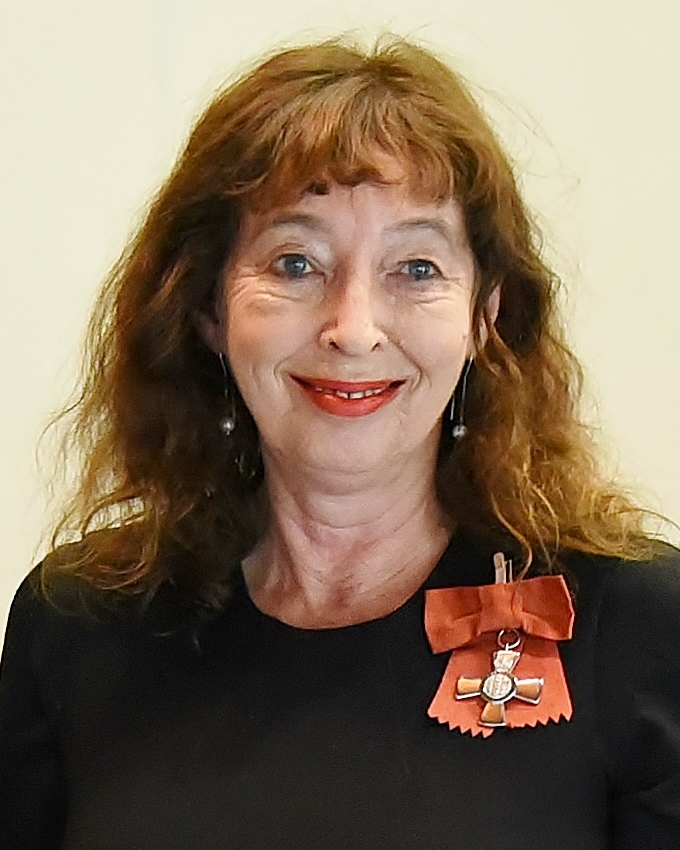
Rachel Lang

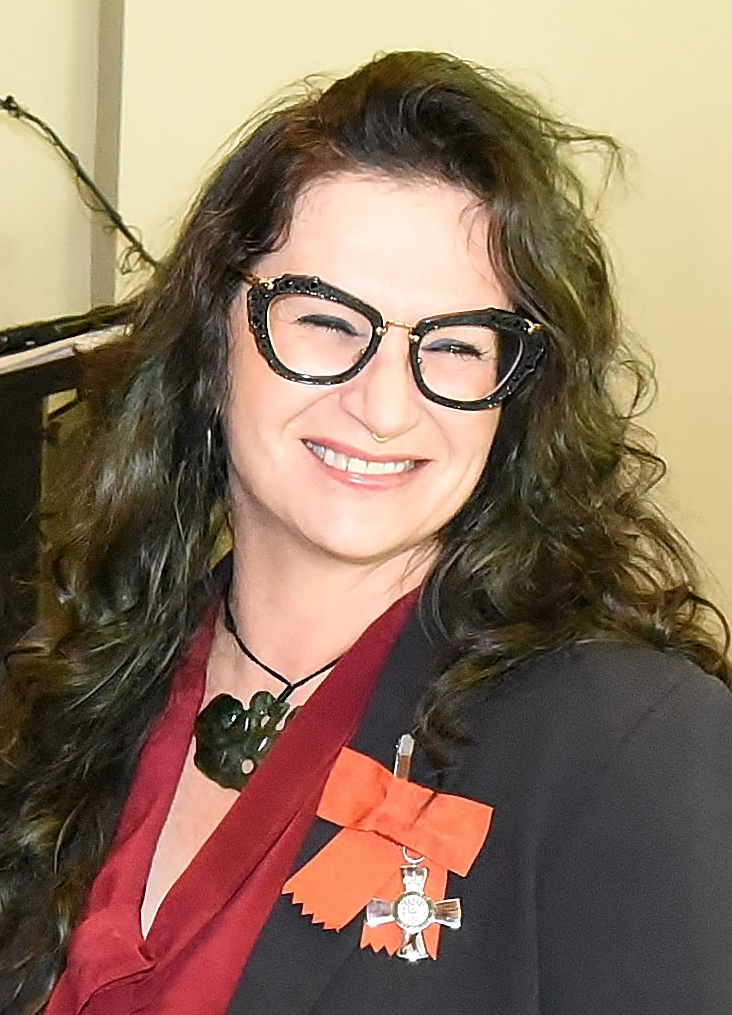
Fiona Pardington

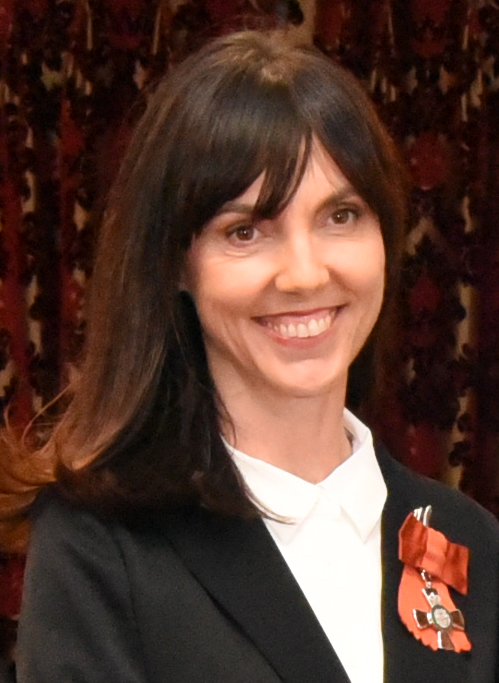
Emily Perkins

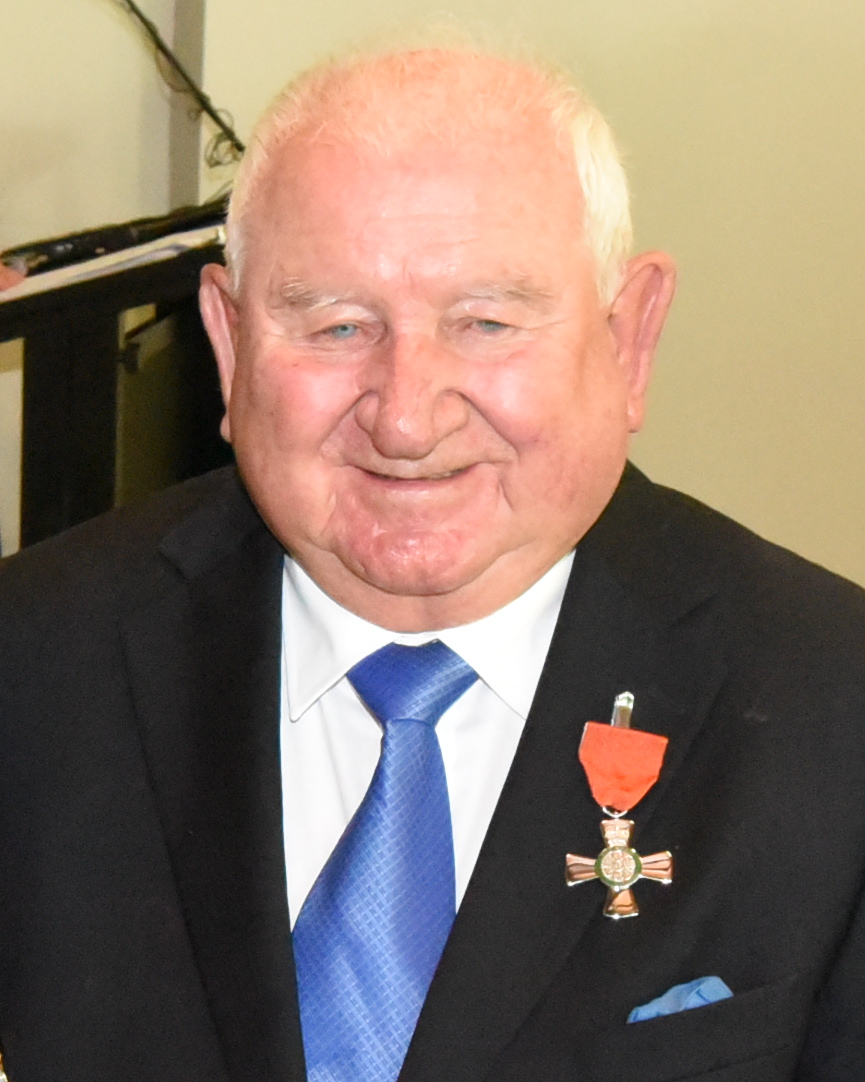
John Roy‑Wojciechowski

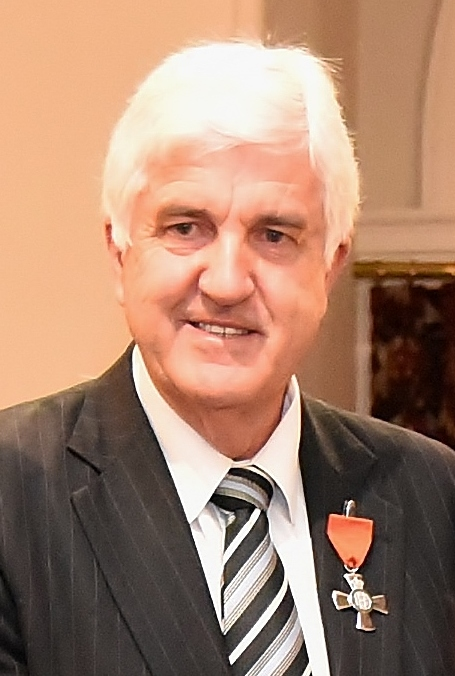
Ross Scarlett

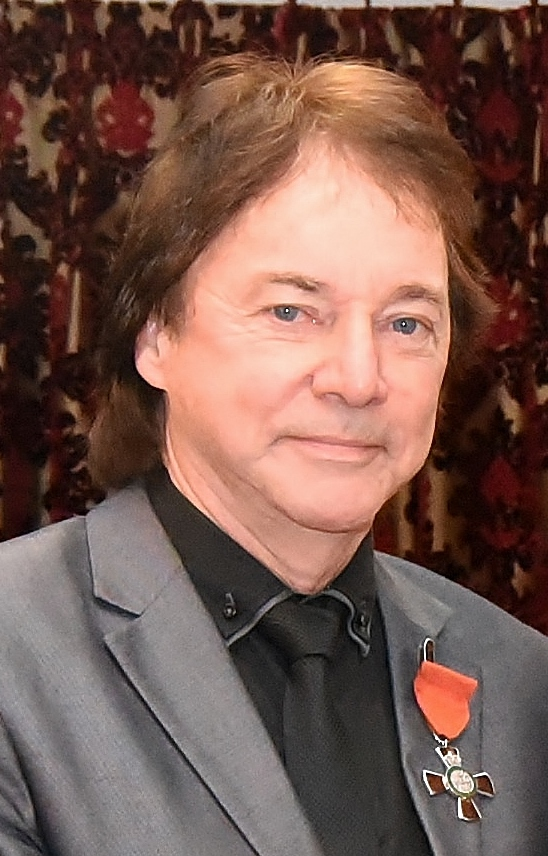
Shane

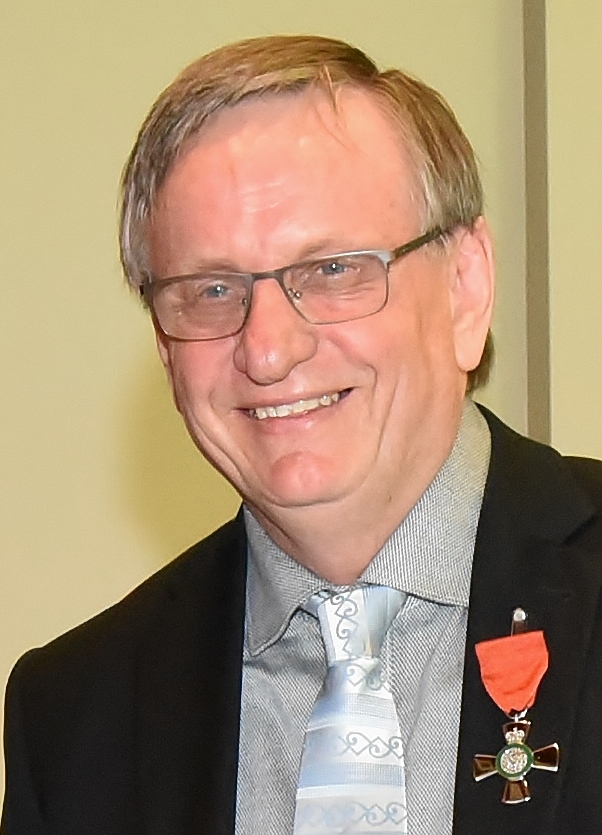
Pat Snedden

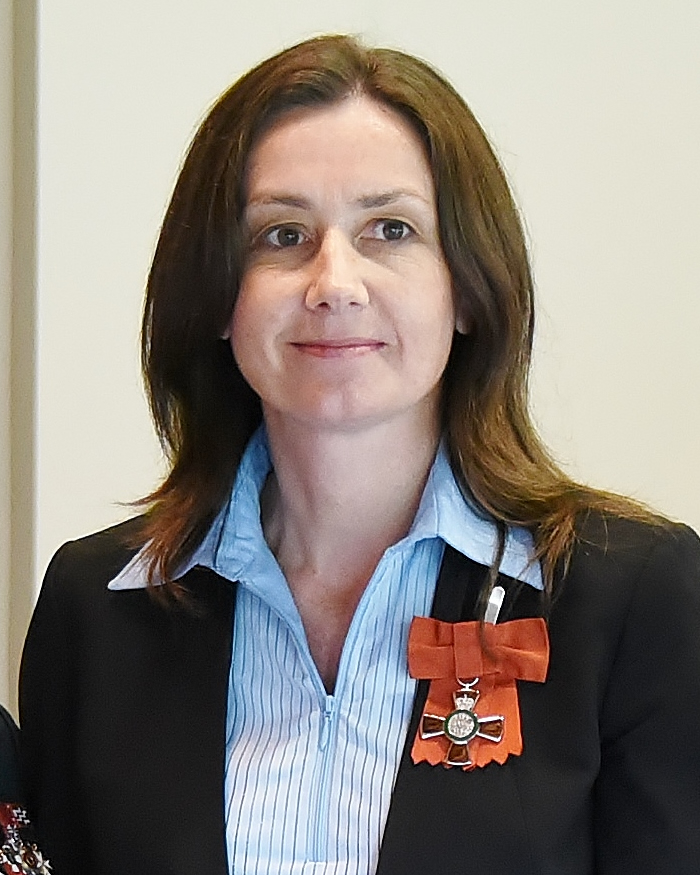
Karen Willcox

== Companion of the Queen's Service Order (QSO) ==
- Paul Richard Baxter – of Porirua. For services to the New Zealand Fire Service.
- Mary Anne Garner – of Nelson. For services to the community.
- Mary Bernadette Gavin – of Nelson. For services to women and the community.
- Michael John Gorman – of Christchurch. For services to the community.
- Deirdre Anne Jolly – of Alexandra. For services to the community.
- Mokataufoou Togakilo Sipeli – of Wellington. For services to the Niue community and education.

== Queen's Service Medal (QSM) ==
- Clarice Lee Anderson – of Waipukurau. For services to the blind and seniors.
- Kerry John Bensemann – of Christchurch. For services to the community.
- Miroroa Te Kune Blackmore – of Bulls. For services to Māori.
- Beryl Mary Bowers – of Picton. For services to the community.
- Kenneth Frederick Bradley – of Te Anau. For services to conservation.
- Timothy Richard Bray – of Auckland. For services to children and theatre.
- Dermot Peter Byrne JP – of Wellington. For services to the community.
- Linda Rae Chalmers – of Auckland. For services to art.
- Annie Naw Coates – of Wellington. For services to ethnic communities.
- Neville Terence Coslett JP – of Papamoa. For services to the community.
- Ronald Grant Crawford – of Auckland. For services to education.
- Keita Rangimarie Dawson – of Auckland. For services to Māori and seniors.
- Ana Maria de Vos Sanchez JP – of Auckland. For services to ethnic communities.
- Bruce Leslie Didham – of Dunedin. For services to the New Zealand Fire Service.
- Brian William Dobson – of Matatā. For services to the New Zealand Fire Service and rugby.
- Brian Robert Dodds – of Balclutha. For services to healthcare and the community.
- Elizabeth Charmaine Donaldson – of Matamata. For services to health and seniors.
- Doris Christine Dunn – of Auckland. For services to the community.
- Mark White Edmonds – of Rotorua. For services to sport.
- Fraser McDonald Faulknor – of Auckland. For services to children, education and music.
- Lois May Finderup – of New Plymouth. For services to the fashion industry and theatre.
- David John Finlay – of Oamaru. For services to irrigation and sport.
- Merrilyn Frances George – of Ohakune. For services to education and the community.
- Judith Jane Gilbert – of Great Barrier Island. For services to conservation.
- Jacqueline Barbara Grinder – of Matamata. For services to the community.
- Rehia Shirley Te Amere Hanara – of Hastings. For services to Māori and education.
- Michael James Hanrahan – of Ashburton. For services to the community.
- David Hansford – of Upper Moutere. For services to the environment.
- Duncan John Hart JP – of Marton. For services to the community.
- Sandra Barbara Anne Hunter – of Matamata. For services to the community.
- Peter Alexander Jack – of Wellington. For services to sport, particularly athletics.
- Kulwinder Singh Jhamat – of Pōkeno. For services to the Indian community.
- William Richard Johns JP – of Christchurch. For services to the community.
- Karl Frederick Lapwood – of Hamilton. For services to the New Zealand Fire Service and business.
- Julia Rosemary Lowe JP – of Paeroa. For services to the community.
- Railene Denise Mabin – of Waipukurau. For services to the Plunket Society.
- Richard Donald Madden – of Dunedin. For services to music.
- Shirley Ann May – of Kaikohe. For services to music and the community.
- Sharon Julie Maynard – of Gisborne. For services to Māori and education.
- Dorothy Margaret McKinnon – of Whanganui. For services to the community.
- Gair McRae – of Auckland. For services to theatre and youth.
- Janet Elaine McRobbie – of Pōkeno. For services to Girl Guides and the community.
- William Kevin Moore – of Twizel. For services to outdoor education and the community.
- Charles Arthur Morgan – of Timaru. For services to the sport of wood chopping.
- James Edward Morgan – of Hastings. For services to the community.
- Ann Shirley Muir – of Whangārei. For services to bowls and the community.
- Iris Mae Officer-Holmes – of Ashburton. For services to the community.
- Michael Francis O'Neill – of Gore. For services to the New Zealand Fire Service and the community.
- Brian Scott Palliser – of Christchurch. For services to the community.
- Barry Richard Pomeroy – of Nelson. For services to veterans and the community.
- Prabha Ravi JP – of Lower Hutt. For services to ethnic communities and dance.
- Dr Claire Aileen Reilly – of Ashburton. For services to people with Motor Neurone Disease.
- Timothy Peter Sander – of Wellington. For services to pipe bands and the community.
- Frances Jean Scammell – of Gore. For services to the community.
- Miles Duncan Shelley – of Ngatea. For services to the New Zealand Fire Service and the community.
- Julian Mervyn Shields – of Nelson. For services to the community.
- Peter Bruce Simmonds – of Christchurch. For services to theatre.
- Geoffrey Brian Spearpoint – of Little River. For services to outdoor recreation.
- Karen Elizabeth Stade – of Nelson. For services to historical research and the community.
- Daphne Gretta Mary Stevens – of Auckland. For services to music.
- Roderick John Sutherland – of Masterton. For services to athletics, cycling and the community.
- Marara Kaweora Te Tai Hook JP – of Hikurangi. For services to Māori.
- Valerie Joan Thorburn – of Tauranga. For services to music education.
- Evan Allan Watkin – of Porirua. For services to cricket.
- Cara June Watson – of Napier. For services to music.
- Dawn Betty White – of Waihi. For services to veterans.
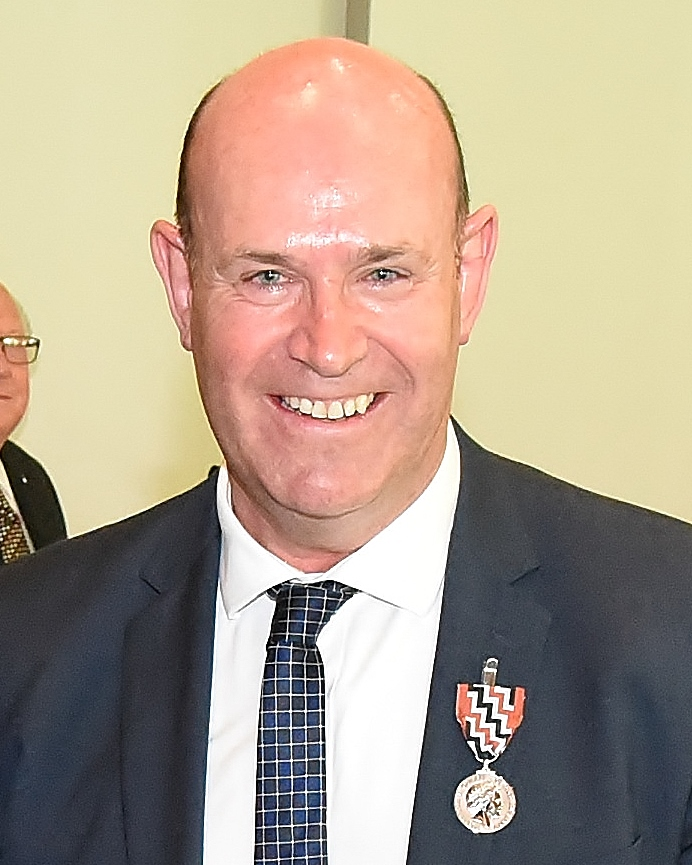
Tim Bray

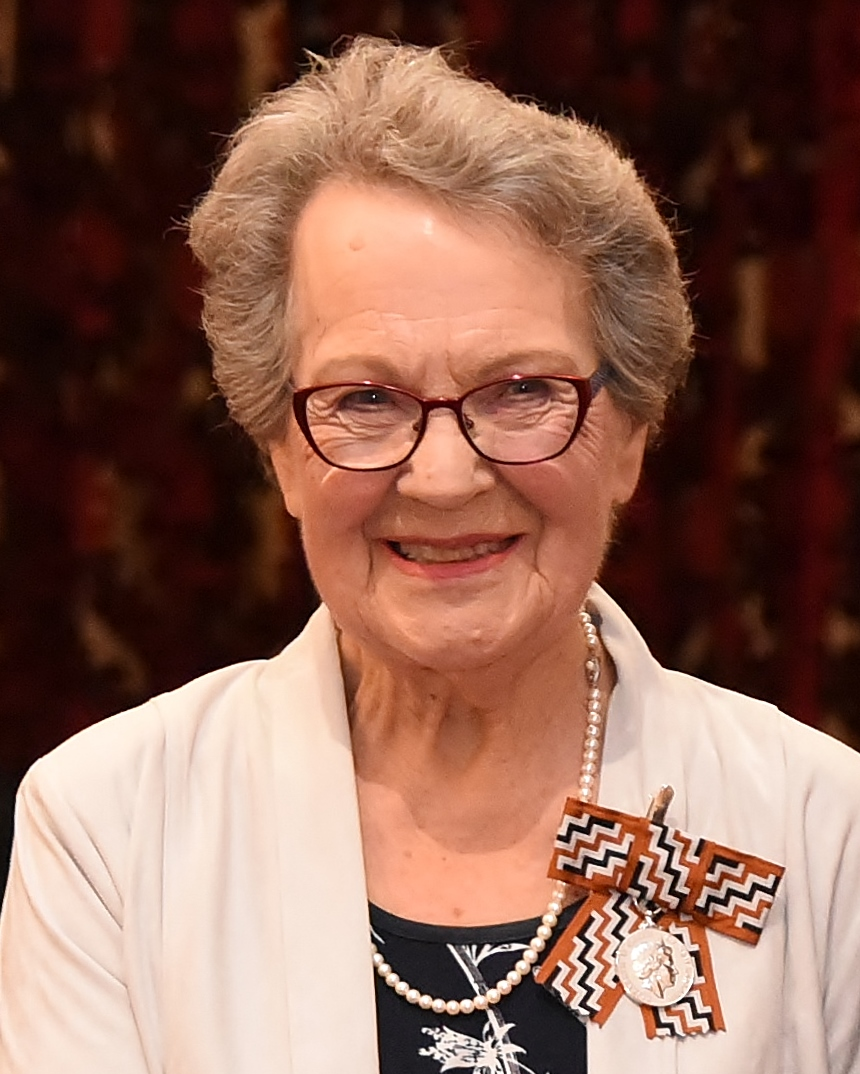
Christine Dunn

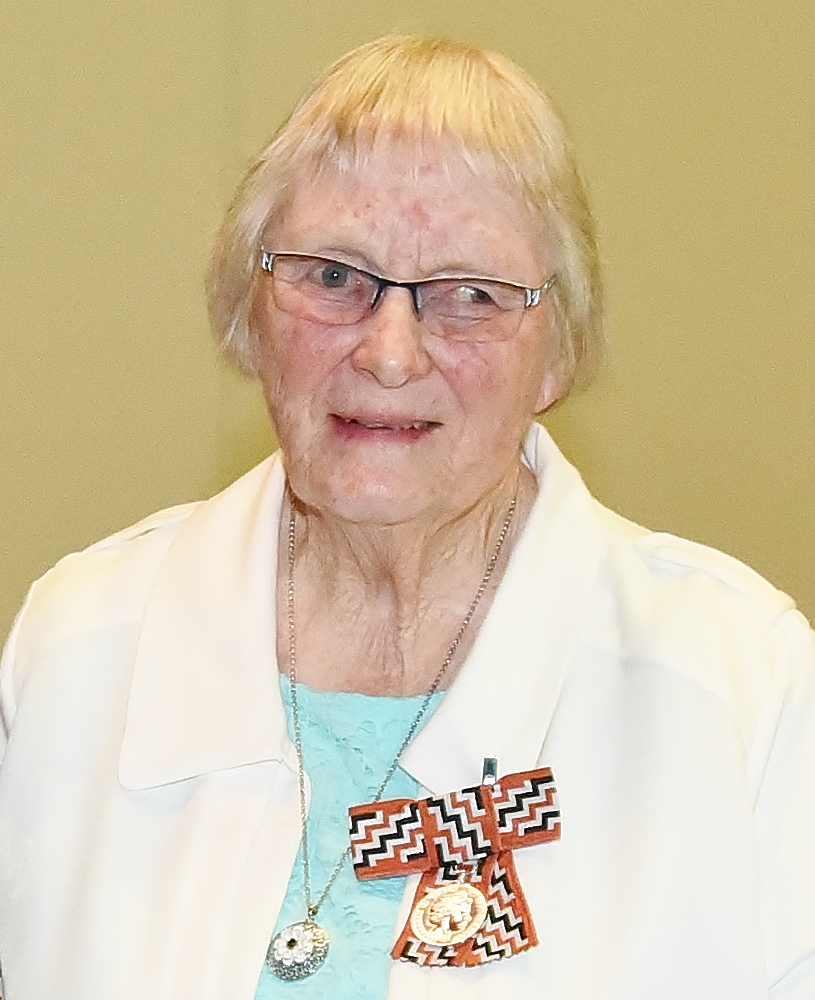
Jackie Grinder

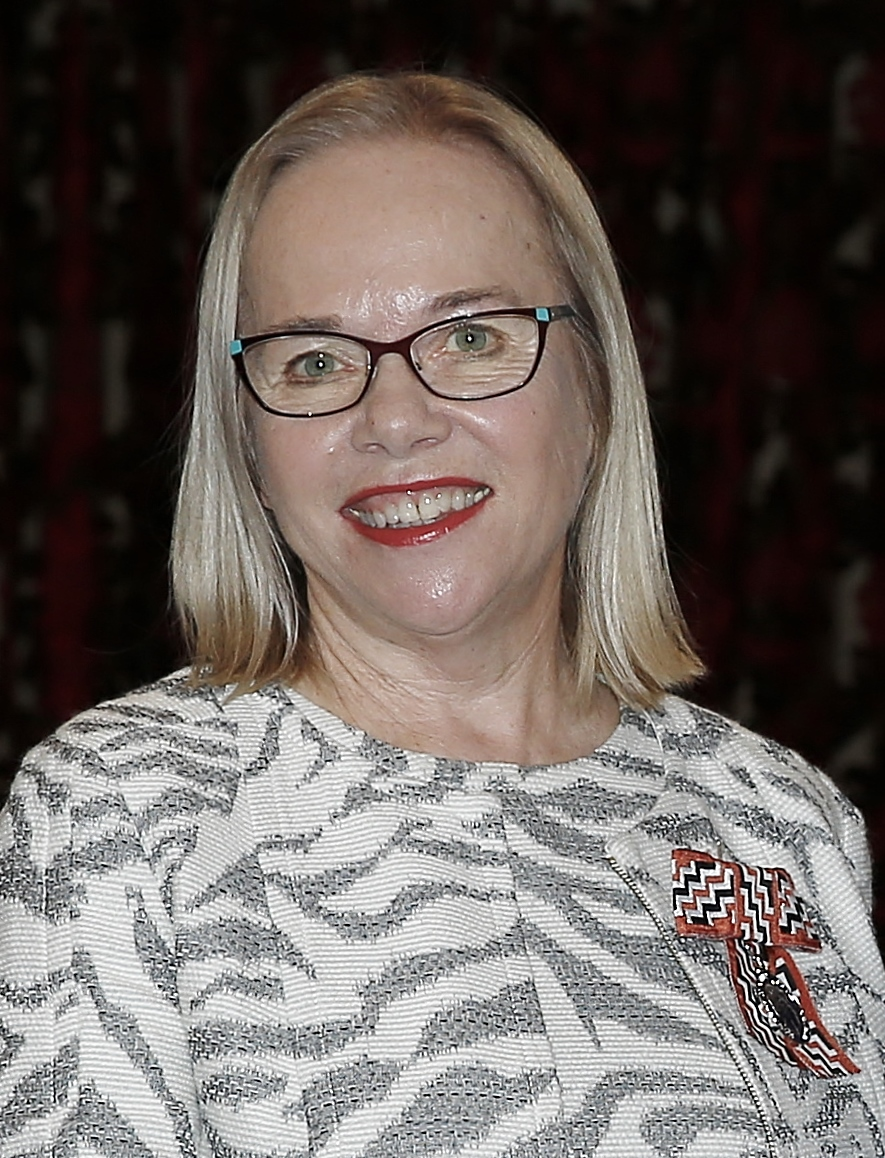
Dot McKinnon

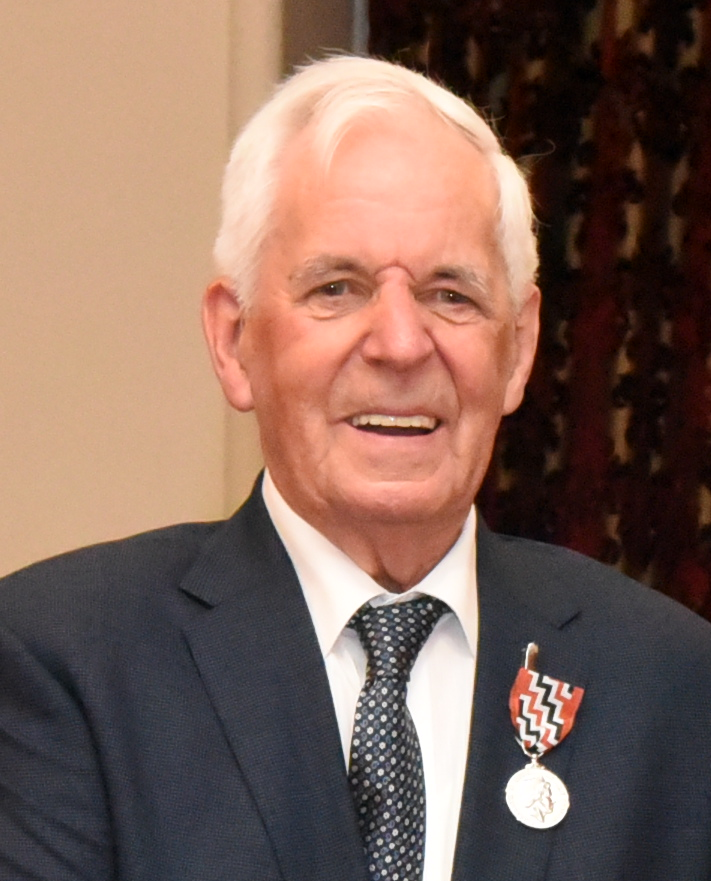
James Morgan

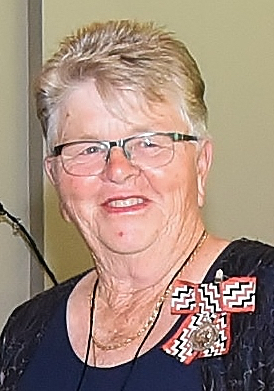
Ann Muir

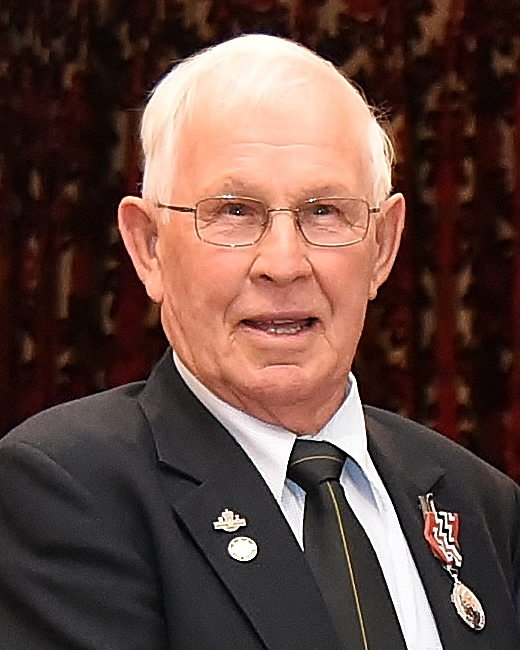
Brian Pomeroy

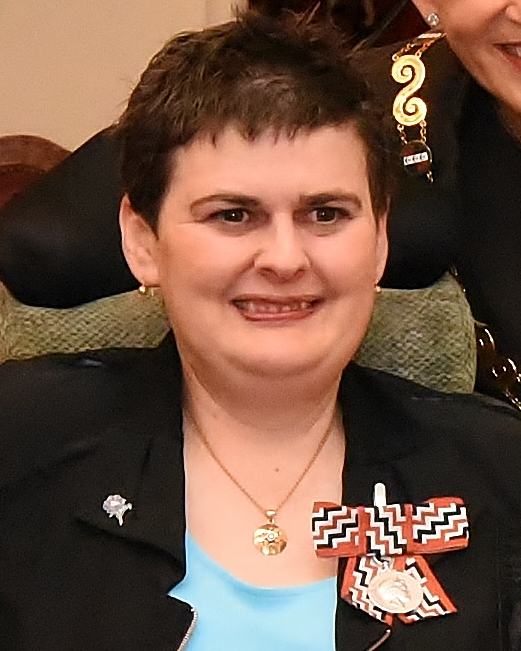
Claire Reilly

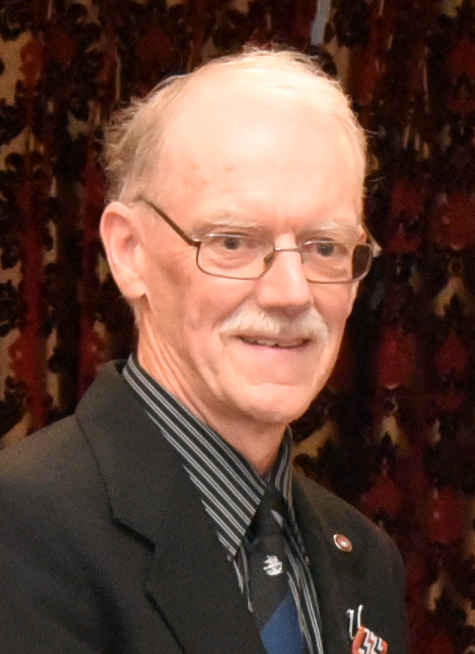
Evan Watkin

== New Zealand Antarctic Medal (NZAM) ==
- Randal Murray Heke – of Waikanae. For services to New Zealand interests in Antarctica and historic preservation.
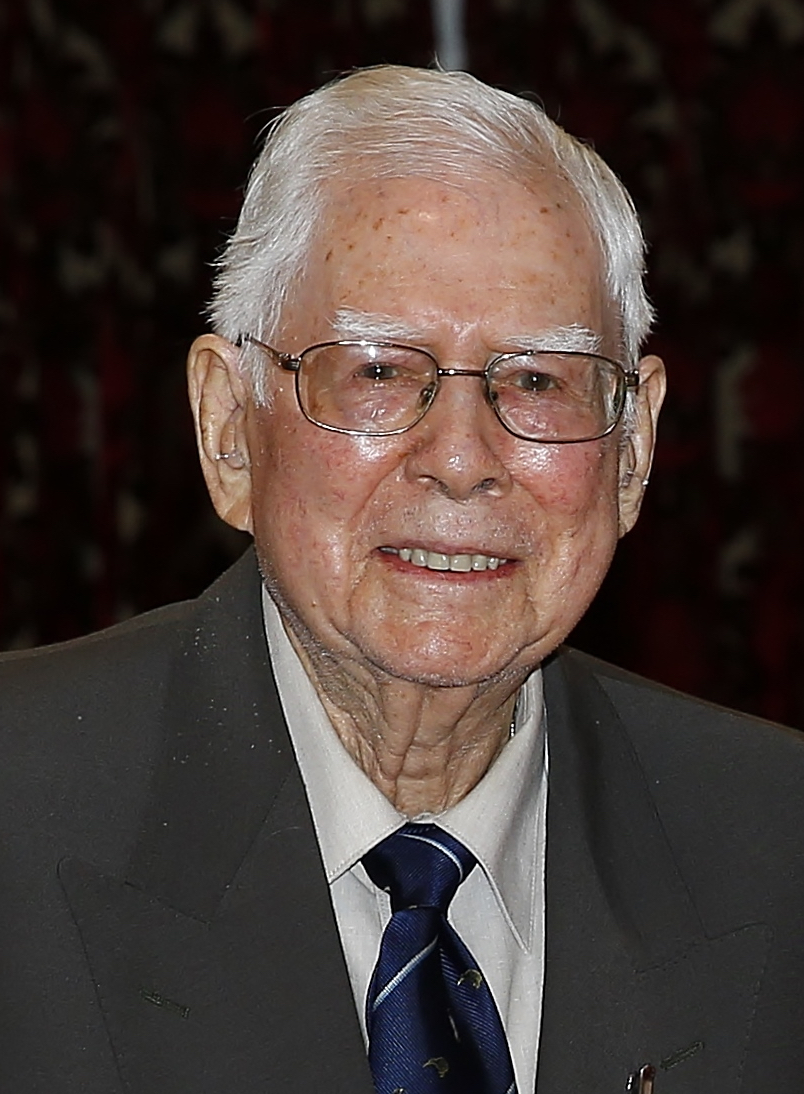
Randal Heke

== New Zealand Distinguished Service Decoration (DSD) ==
- Staff Sergeant Tina Kathleen Grant – of Auckland. For services to the New Zealand Defence Force.
- Brigadier Anthony Bryan Howie ONZM – of Mogadishu, Somalia. For services to the New Zealand Defence Force.
- Squadron Leader Nicholas Michael Pedley – of Feilding. For services to the New Zealand Defence Force.
- Major Charmaine Maurita Tate – of Auckland. For services to the New Zealand Defence Force.
- Major Andrew James Anthony Thornton – of Burnham. For services to the New Zealand Defence Force.
