= Vicky Cameron =

New Zealand medical researcher

Vicky Cameron ONZM
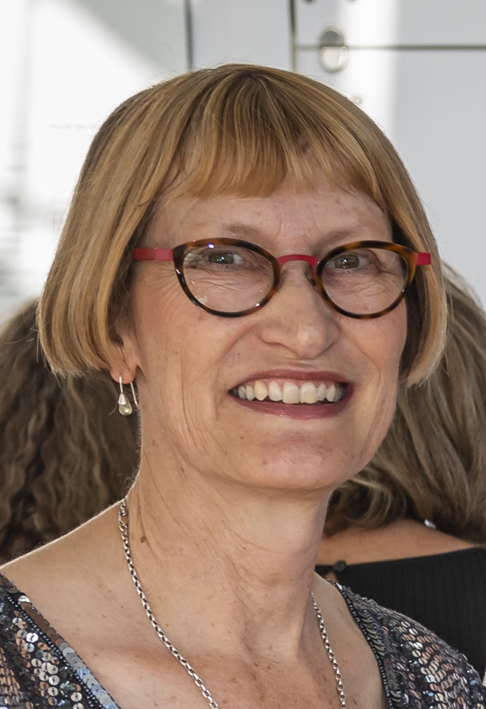
- Cameron in November 2020
- Education: Christchurch School of Medicine
- Scientific career
- Workplaces: Christchurch School of Medicine; Salk Institute for Biological Studies
- Thesis: The role of brain hormones in the regulation of hypothalmic-pituitary secretion during acute haemorrhagic stress (1988)

Anne Victoria Cameron ONZM is a New Zealand medical researcher specialising in molecular endocrinology.

== Academic career ==
Cameron was working as a scientific officer at the Christchurch School of Medicine, University of Otago, when she completed her PhD entitled The Role of Brain Hormones in the Regulation of Hypothalamic-Pituitary Secretion During Acute Haemorrhagic Stress in 1990. After a Fogarty Postdoctoral Research Fellowship-supported postdoc at the Salk Institute, in San Diego, she returned to Christchurch in 1993, rising to full professor.

In the 2017 Queen's Birthday Honours, Cameron was appointed an Officer of the New Zealand Order of Merit, for services to health.

== Publications ==
She currently has 197 publications to her credit with over 5400 citations and 19,700 reads.

== Awards ==
- International Ambassador on the American Heart Association Council on Genomic and Precision Medicine Leadership Committee from the year 2019-2022
- Gold medal in research in Otago university.
- The New Zealand Society of Endocrinology Nancy Sirett Memorial Lecture Award in the year 2016.
