= Annie K. Powell =

British chemist (born 1959)

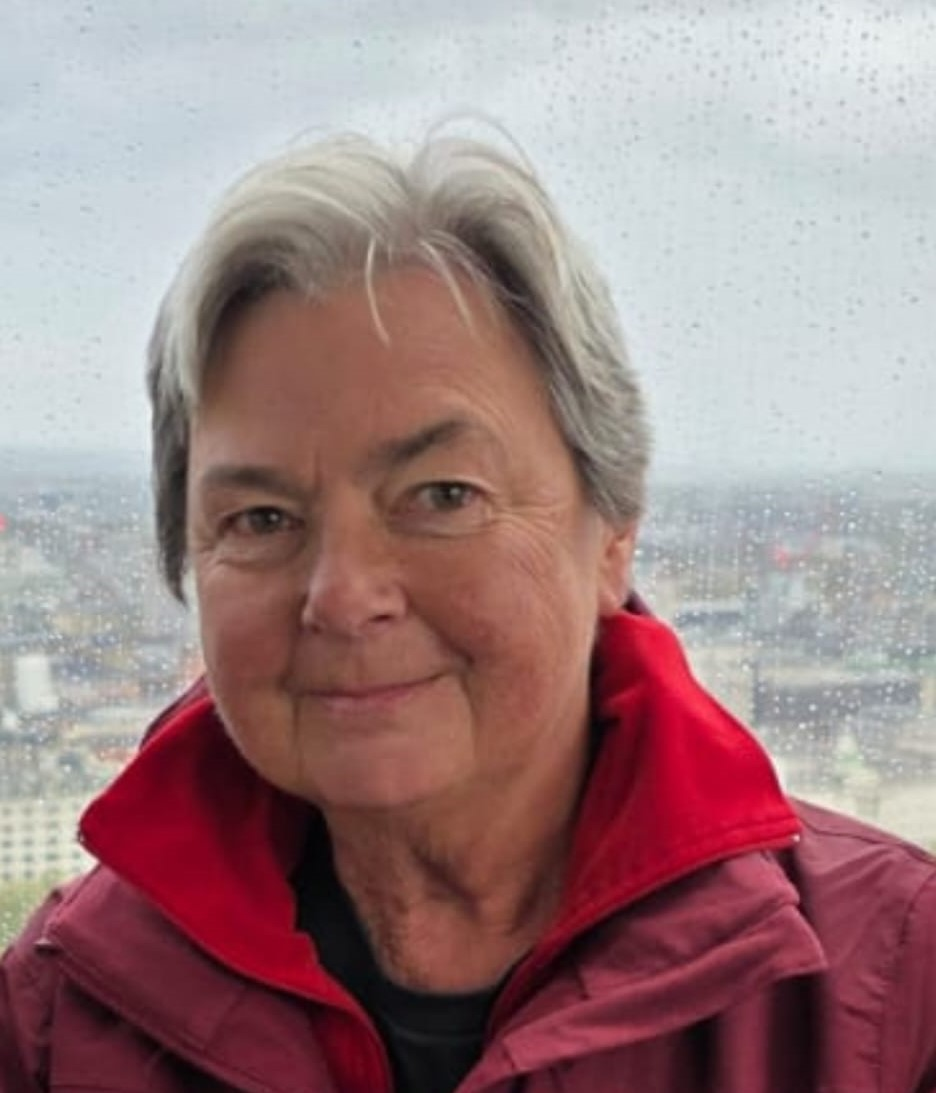
Prof. Annie K. Powell

Annie K. Powell (born October 20, 1959) is a British scientist and a professor of inorganic chemistry at the Karlsruhe Institute of Technology (KIT), Germany. Her research focuses on single-molecule magnets, coordination clusters, metal–organic frameworks (MOFs), environmental and sustainable chemistry.

== Early life and education ==
Powell was born in Lincoln, England, the daughter of Stephen and Elisabeth. She attended Mount Street, Westgate, and Yarborough schools in Lincoln. Powell earned a Bachelor of Science degree with honours in chemistry from the University of Manchester in 1981. She received her PhD in chemistry from the same university in 1985, under the supervision of Dr. Mike Ware, for research on complexes of iron(III).

== Career and research ==
After receiving her doctorate, Powell worked as a postdoctoral researcher at the University of Freiburg in Germany with Prof. Dr. H. Vahrenkamp from 1986 to 1988. In 1988, she joined the University of Kent at Canterbury, UK, as a lecturer. Later, from 1989 to 1999, she worked in different roles as lecturer, senior lecturer, reader, professor of chemistry at the University of East Anglia, Norwich in the UK. Since 1999, she has been a full professor (W3) at the Karlsruhe Institute of Technology (formerly the University of Karlsruhe).

While working at the University of East Anglia, Powell, along with her colleague S. Heath, synthesized an Fe(III) molecule containing 19 iron centres. Subsequently, through collaboration with Dante Gatteschi of the University of Florence, the magnetic properties of this molecule were measured, revealing a large spin ground state. Further studies established that the system behaves as a single-molecule magnet (SMM). She contributed to the discovery of the first molecule exhibiting a toroidal moment. The non-collinear arrangement of Ising spins in a Dy_{3} triangular coordination complex is considered an early example in the development of the research area known as Single Molecule Toroics (SMTs). The Powell Research Group at KIT is currently engaged in research on molecular magnets, MOFs, biomimetics, coordination compounds and multi functional materials.

== Awards and honors ==
- Honorary Professor at the University of Otago (2018-present)
- Seaborg Lectureship, University of California, Berkeley (2014)
- Wilsmore Fellow, University of Melbourne (2012)
- Walker Memorial Lecture, University of Edinburgh (2011)
- Elected Fellow of Royal Society of Chemistry (2002)
- Ciba-Geigy Award Fellowship (1996)

== Selected publications ==
1. Powell, A. K.; Heath, S. L.; Gatteschi, D.; Pardi, L.; Sessoli, R.; Spina, G.; Del Giallo, F.; Pieralli, F. Synthesis, Structures, and Magnetic Properties of Fe2, Fe17, and Fe19 Oxo-Bridged Iron Clusters: The Stabilization of High Ground State Spins by Cluster Aggregates. J. Am. Chem. Soc. 1995, 117 (9), 2491–2502. https://doi.org/10.1021/ja00114a012
2. Tang, J.; Hewitt, I.; Madhu, N. T.; Chastanet, G.; Wernsdorfer, W.; Anson, C. E.; Benelli, C.; Sessoli, R.; Powell, A. K. Dysprosium Triangles Showing Single‐Molecule Magnet Behavior of Thermally Excited Spin States. Angew. Chem. Int. Ed. 2006, 45 (11), 1729–1733. https://doi.org/10.1002/anie.200503564
3. Hewitt, I. J.; Tang, J.; Madhu, N. T.; Anson, C. E.; Lan, Y.; Luzon, J.; Etienne, M.; Sessoli, R.; Powell, A. K. Coupling Dy 3 Triangles Enhances Their Slow Magnetic Relaxation. Angew. Chemie 2010, 122 (36), 6496–6500. https://doi.org/10.1002/ange.201002691
4. Baniodeh, A.; Magnani, N.; Lan, Y.; Buth, G.; Anson, C. E.; Richter, J.; Affronte, M.; Schnack, J.; Powell, A. K. High Spin Cycles: Topping the Spin Record for a Single Molecule Verging on Quantum Criticality. npj Quantum Mater. 2018, 3 (1), 10. https://doi.org/10.1038/s41535-018-0082-7
