= 2016 Special Honours (New Zealand) =

- Previous: 2016 Queen's Birthday Honours; Next: 2017 New Year Honours
- Type: New Zealand royal honours: New Zealand Order of Merit; Queen's Service Order
- Date: 27 June 2016; 24 August 2016
- Country: New Zealand

Highlights
- Total recipients: 3

The 2016 Special Honours in New Zealand were two Special Honours Lists, published in New Zealand on 27 June and 24 August 2016. Appointments were made to the New Zealand Order of Merit and the Queen's Service Order to recognise the incoming governor-general, Dame Patsy Reddy, and the outgoing vice-regal consort, Janine, Lady Mateparae.

In addition, a third Special Honours List was published on 1 August, promulgating the 2016 New Zealand bravery awards.

== New Zealand Order of Merit ==
=== Dame Grand Companion (GNZM) ===
Additional

- Dame Patricia Lee Reddy DNZM – Governor-General Designate
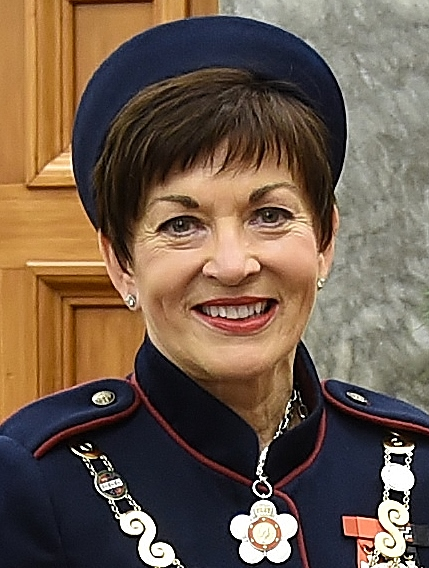
Dame Patsy Reddy

== Companion of the Queen's Service Order (QSO) ==
Additional

- Janine Elizabeth, Lady Mateparae
- Dame Patricia Lee Reddy DNZM – Governor-General Designate
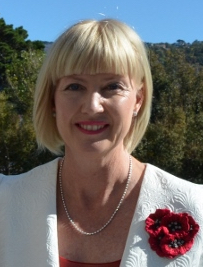
Janine, Lady Mateparae

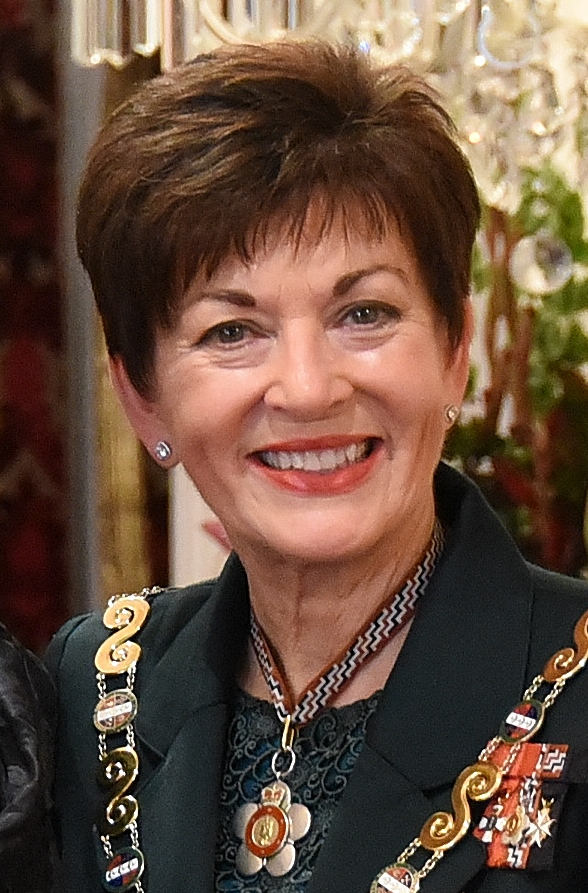
Dame Patsy Reddy
