= 2017 New Year Honours (New Zealand) =

Annual awards for New Zealanders

- Previous: 2016 Special Honours; Next: 2017 Queen's Birthday Honours
- Type: New Zealand royal honours: New Zealand Order of Merit; Queen's Service Order; Queen's Service Medal; New Zealand Distinguished Service Decoration
- Date: 31 December 2016
- Country: New Zealand
- Total recipients: 194

The 2017 New Year Honours in New Zealand were appointments by Elizabeth II in her right as Queen of New Zealand, on the advice of the New Zealand government, to various orders and honours to reward and highlight good works by New Zealanders, and to celebrate the passing of 2016 and the beginning of 2017. They were announced on 31 December 2016.

The recipients of honours are displayed here as they were styled before their new honour.

== New Zealand Order of Merit ==
=== Dame Companion (DNZM) ===
- Valerie Kasanita Adams ONZM – of Auckland. For services to athletics.
- Georgina Kingi QSO – of Hastings. For services to Māori and education.
- The Honourable Frances Helen Wilde CNZM QSO – of Wellington. For services to the State and the community.
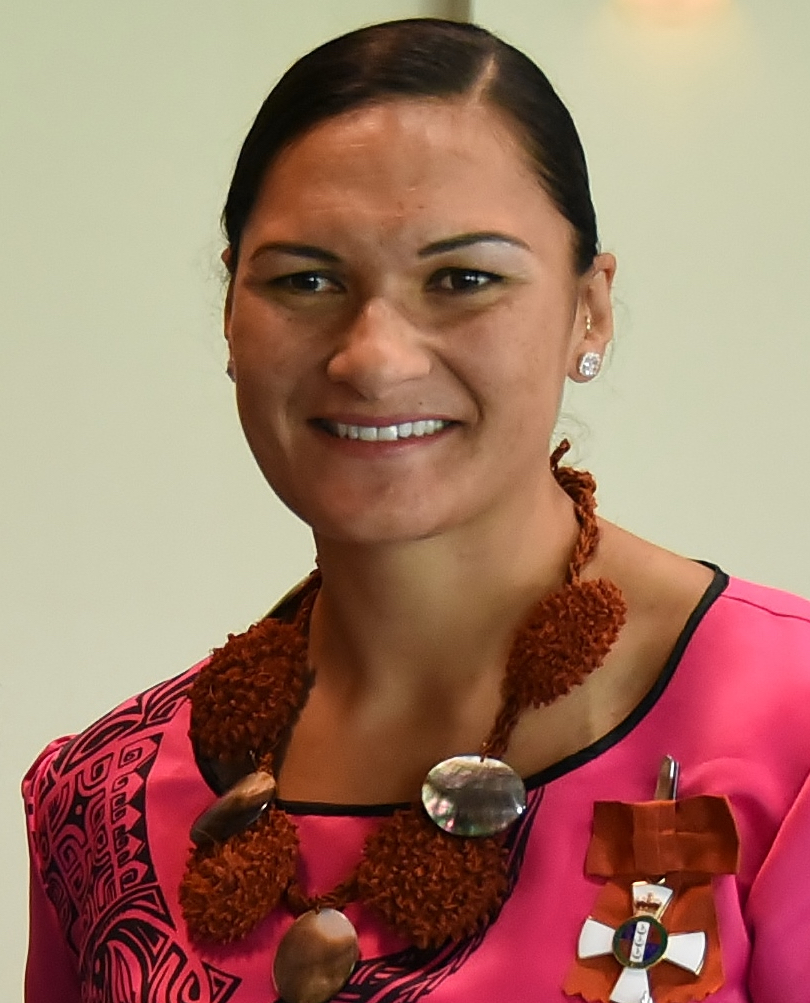
Dame Valerie Adams

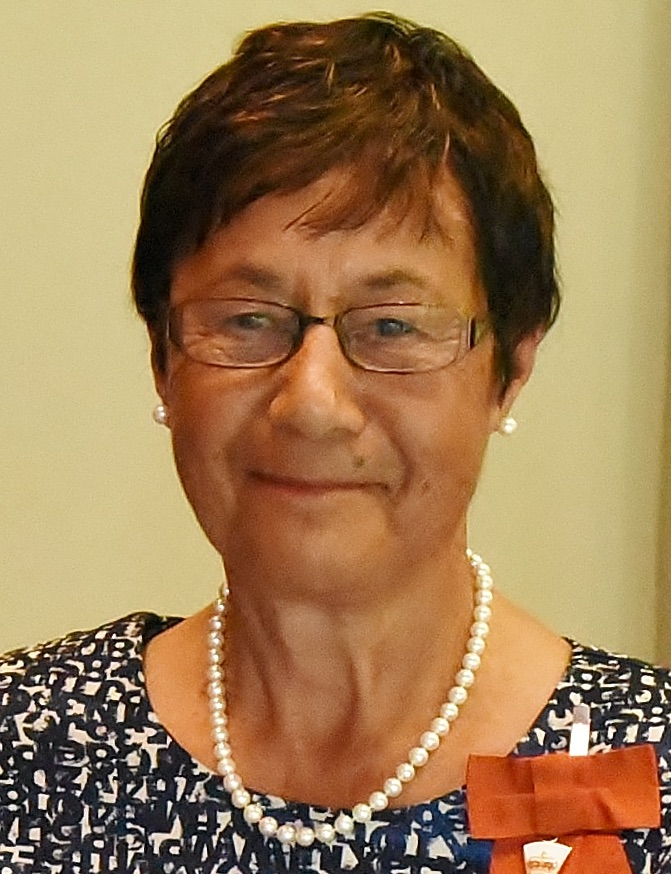
Dame Georgina Kingi

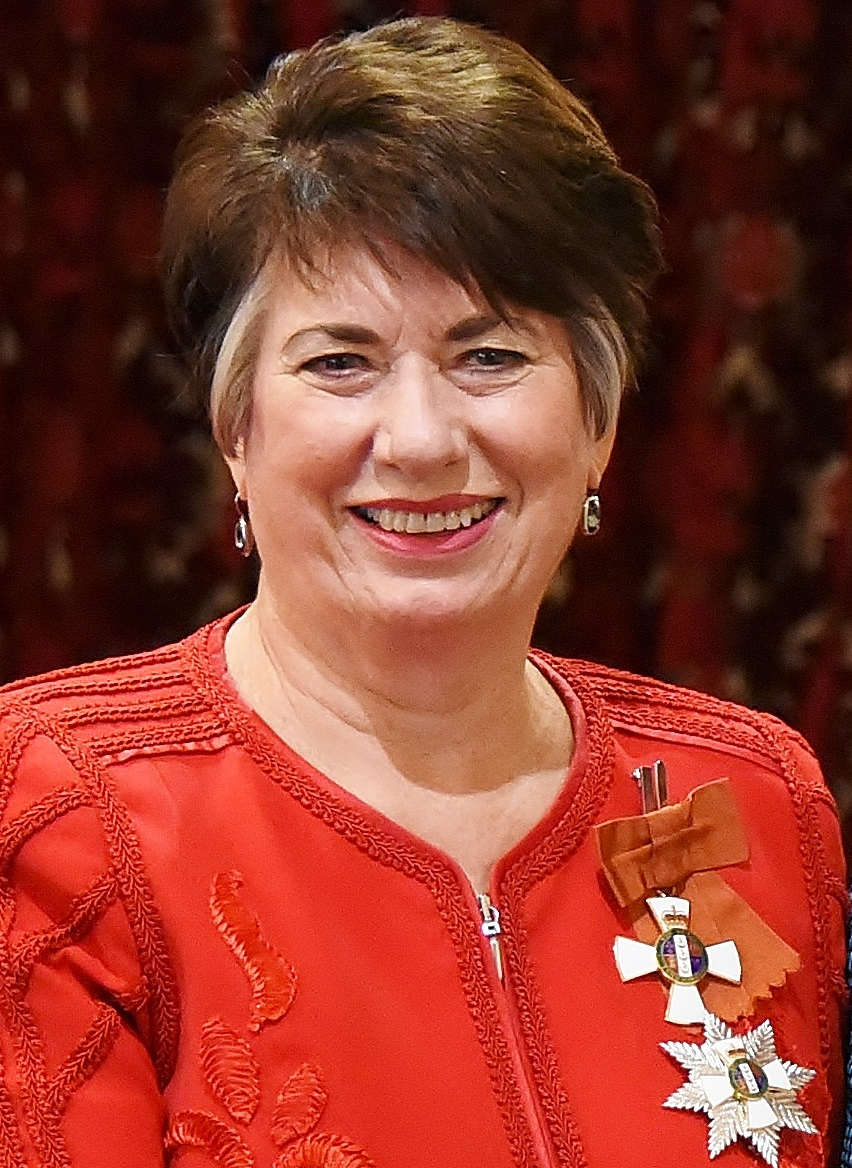
Dame Fran Wilde

=== Knight Companion (KNZM) ===
- Distinguished Professor Richard Lewis Maxwell Faull ONZM – of Auckland. For services to medical research.
- Brian Joseph Roche – of Wellington. For services to the State and business.
- The Honourable Toke Tufukia Talagi – of Alofi, Niue. For services to Niue.
- David Arthur Rhodes Williams QC – of Auckland. For services to international law and international arbitration.
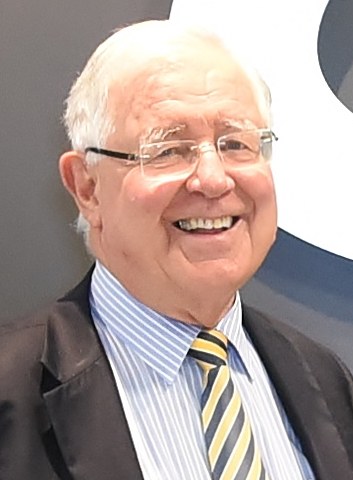
Sir Richard Faull

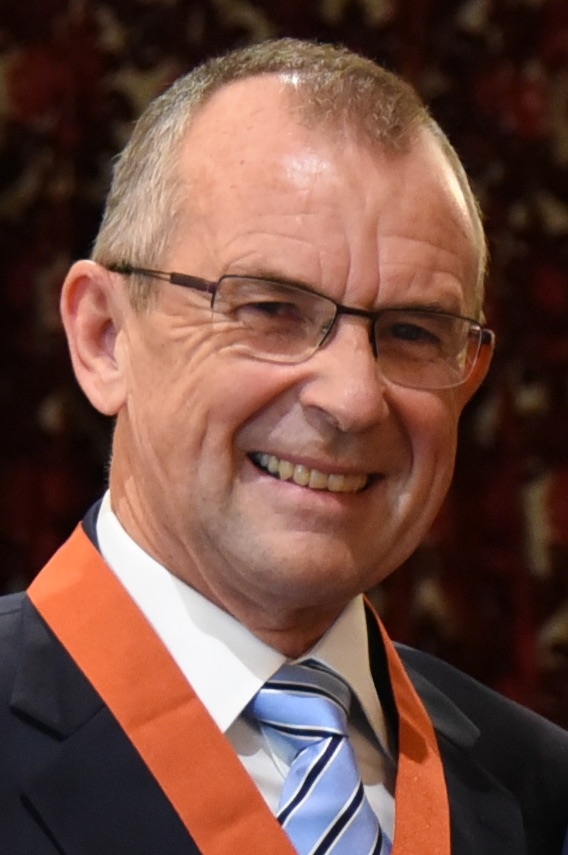
Sir Brian Roche

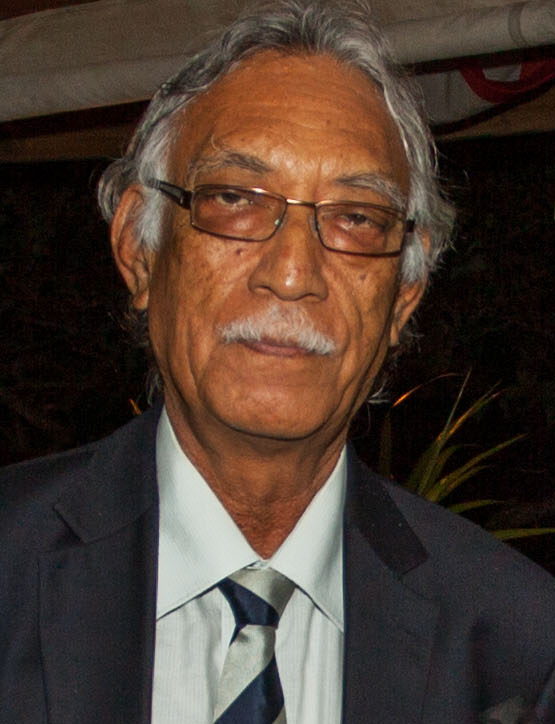
Sir Toke Talagi

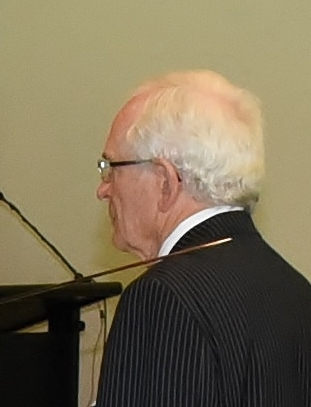
Sir David Williams

=== Companion (CNZM) ===
- Emeritus Professor John Frederick Burrows ONZM QC – of Christchurch. For services to the State.
- The Honourable Marion Anne Frater – of Wellington. For services to the judiciary.
- The Honourable Philip Bruce Goff – of Auckland. For services as a member of Parliament.
- David Howman – of Wellington. For services to sport.
- Mary Catherine Kamo – of Banks Peninsula. For services to the welfare of prisoners.
- The Honourable Patrick John Keane – of Auckland. For services to the judiciary.
- The Honourable Murray John Finlay Luxton QSO – of Wellington. For services to the dairy industry.
- Iain Robert Rennie – of Wellington. For services to the State.
- Paul Randolph Rose – of Hamilton. For services to ophthalmology and optometry.
- Michael Rowland Stanley – of Auckland. For services to sport.
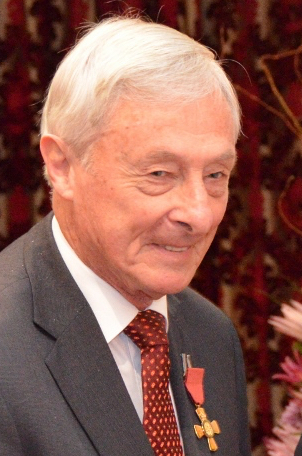
John Burrows

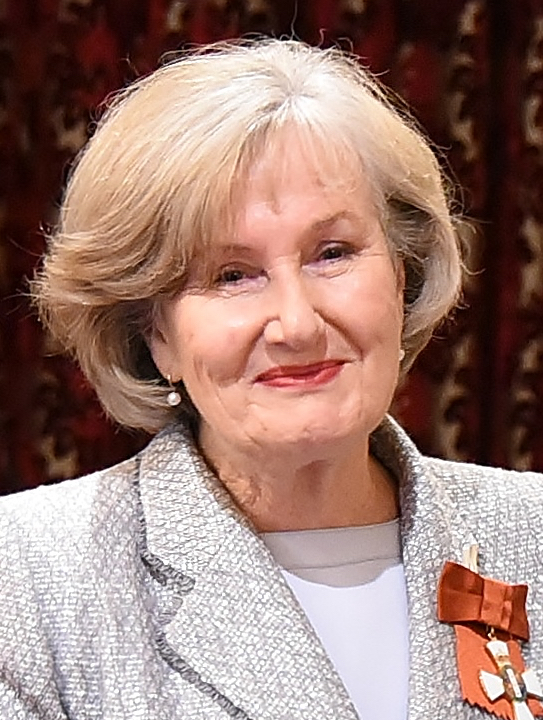
Marion Frater

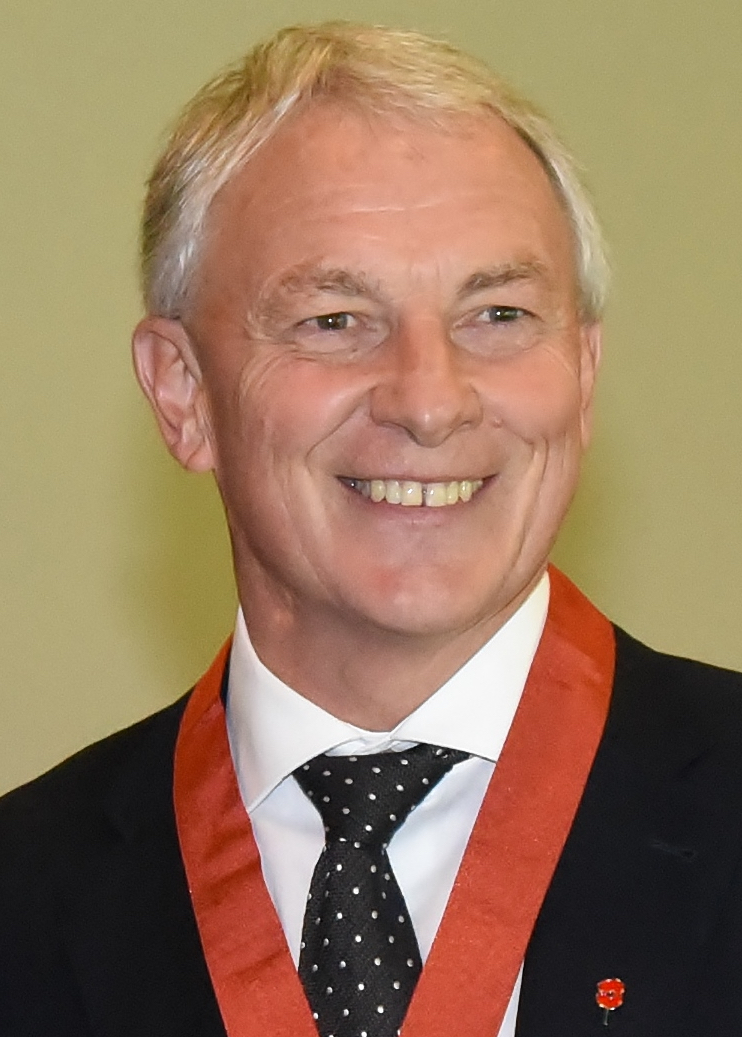
Phil Goff

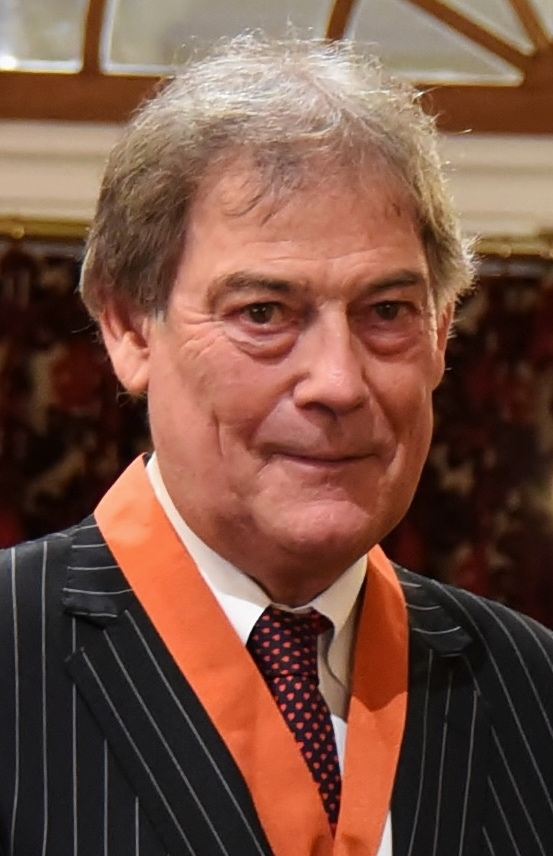
David Howman

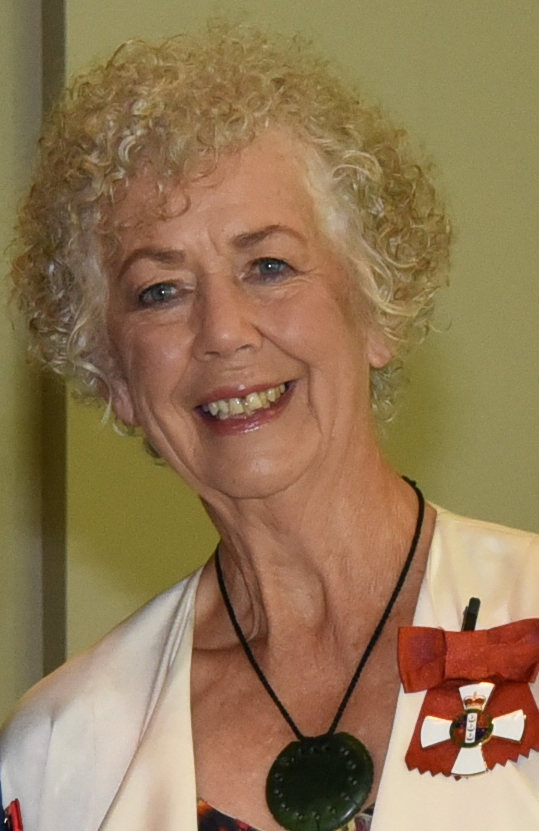
Mary Kamo

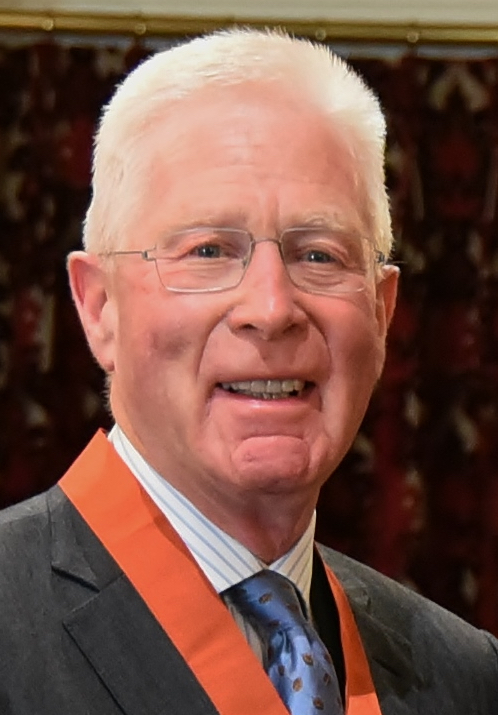
Patrick Keane

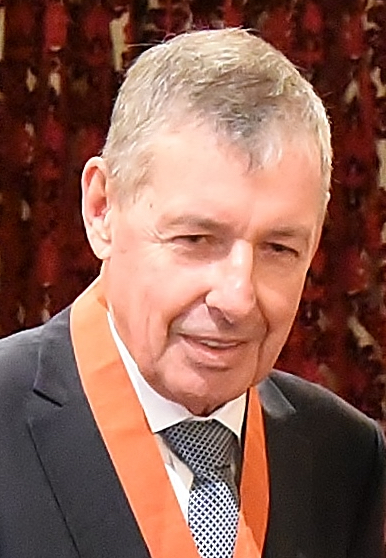
John Luxton

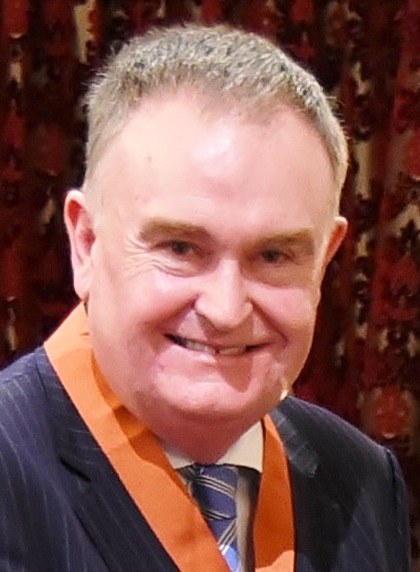
Ian Rennie

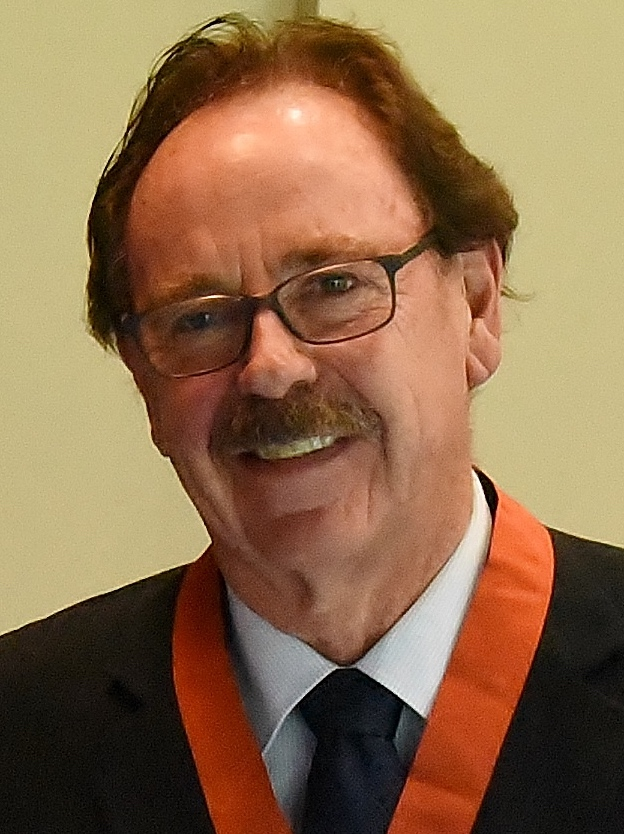
Paul Rose

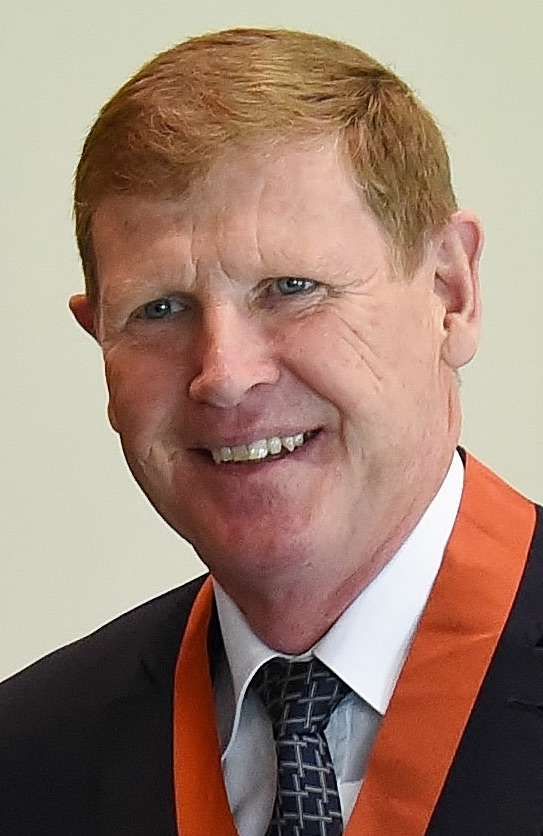
Mike Stanley

=== Officer (ONZM) ===
- Richard Hammond Aitken – of Auckland. For services to business and engineering.
- Naomi Eunice Ballantyne – of Auckland. For services to the insurance industry.
- Roger Francis Albion Bridge – of Christchurch. For services to business and philanthropy.
- Cameron Temple Brown – of Auckland. For services to triathlon.
- Kelvin John Coe – of Leeston. For services to local government.
- Vi Cottrell QSM – of Kaiapoi. For services to trade aid and the fair trade movement.
- Stuart Alan Crosby – of Tauranga. For services to local government.
- Peter Jakob Ernst Heinrich Diessl – of Wellington. For services to music and philanthropy.
- Beverley Rae Duff – of Wellington. For services to women and education.
- Roland Alexander Ellis – of Dannevirke. For services to local government.
- John Ioane Fiso – of Wellington. For services to sport, education and the pacific community.
- Peter John Garden – of Wānaka. For services to aviation and conservation.
- Jennifer Mary Gill – of Auckland. For services to philanthropy.
- John Leslie Harrington – of Christchurch. For services to youth.
- Terence Charles Hatch – of Auckland. For services to horticulture.
- Durham Maxwell John Havill – of Hokitika. For services to local government, business and the community.
- Professor Robert Hans George Jahnke – of Palmerston North. For services to Māori art and education.
- Justine Margaret Kidd – of Takapau. For services to the dairy industry and equestrian sport.
- Peter Thomas Kiely – of Auckland. For services to New Zealand's interests in the Pacific and the law.
- Glenn Francis Leach – of Whitianga. For services to tourism and local government.
- Annette Kay Main – of Whanganui. For services to local government.
- Professor Donald Malcolm McRae – of Ottawa, Canada. For services to the State and international law.
- Dr David Ross Mitchell – of Pegasus. For services to education.
- Robin Timothy Christopher Murphy – of Waimate. For services to land and water management.
- Tihi Anne Daisy Nobel – of Hāwera. For services to Māori.
- Barrie Mitchell Osborne – of Mill Valley, California, United States of America. For services to the film industry.
- Ranjna Patel QSM JP – of Auckland. For services to health and the Indian community.
- Laurance Paterson – of Gore. For services to the beef industry.
- Ross James Paterson – of Tauranga. For services to local government.
- Linda Marie Penno – of Christchurch. For services to women's health and reproductive rights.
- Simon Perry – of Hamilton. For services to sport and philanthropy.
- Leanne Pooley – of Auckland. For services to documentary filmmaking.
- Rerekohu Ahiahi Robertson – of Waipukurau. For services to Māori.
- Elizabeth Malbon Robins – of Dunsandel. For services to children's welfare.
- Catherine Samantha Russell – of Christchurch. For services to health and governance.
- Gaylene Ann Sciascia – of Porirua. For services to dance.
- Charles Howard Shadbolt – of Christchurch. For services to the fishing industry and philanthropy.
- Bruce Raymond Sheppard – of Auckland. For services to business.
- Dr Neil Andrew Sinclair MNZM – of Putāruru. For services to local government.
- Alistair Travers Sowman – of Blenheim. For services to local government.
- Adrienne Lee Staples – of Featherston. For services to local government.
- Bruce Moncur Stewart – of Milton. For services to the community and the construction industry.
- Keith Bruce Taylor – of Wellington. For services to the State.
- Geoffrey Harold Thorpe – of Gisborne. For services to the wine industry.
- Sarah Trotman – of Auckland. For services to business and the community.
- Vanessa Clare van Uden – of Queenstown. For services to local government.
- Anne Elizabeth Wilkinson – of Hamilton. For services to people with disabilities.

Honorary

- Gad Propper OBE – of Ramat HaSharon, Israel. For services to New Zealand–Israel relations.
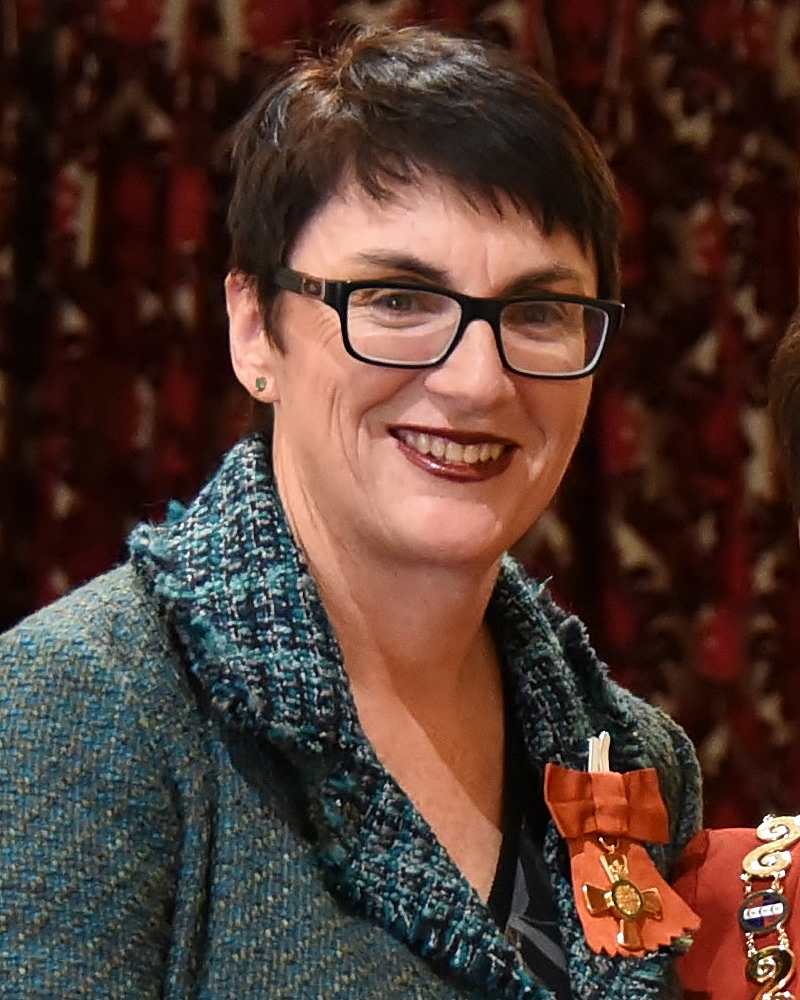
Naomi Ballantyne

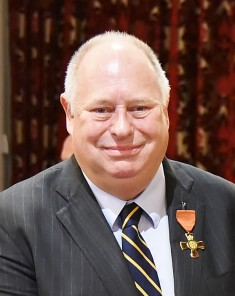
Roger Bridge

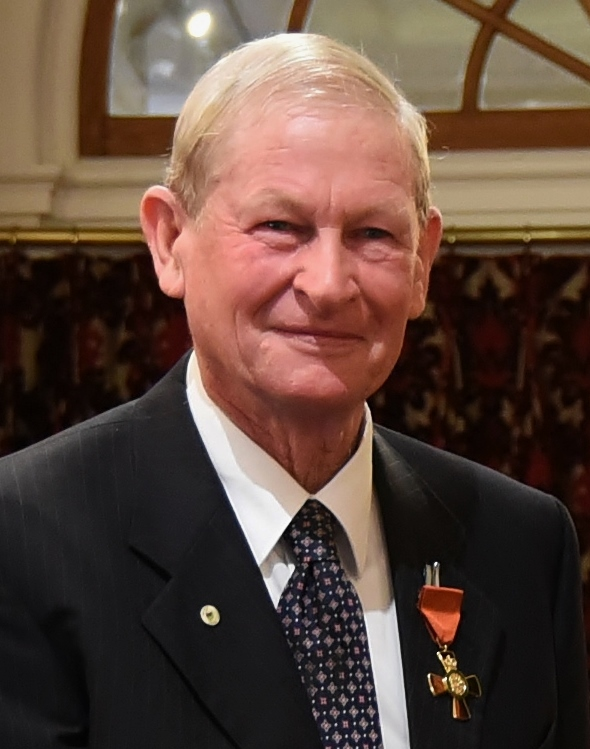
Kelvin Coe

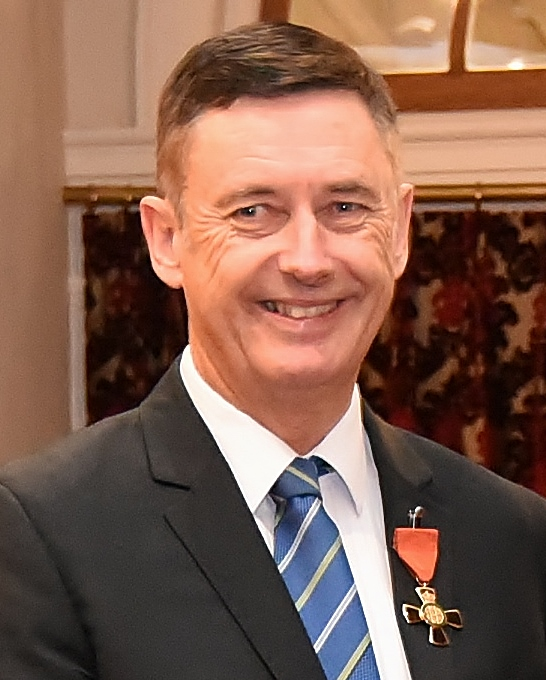
Stuart Crosby

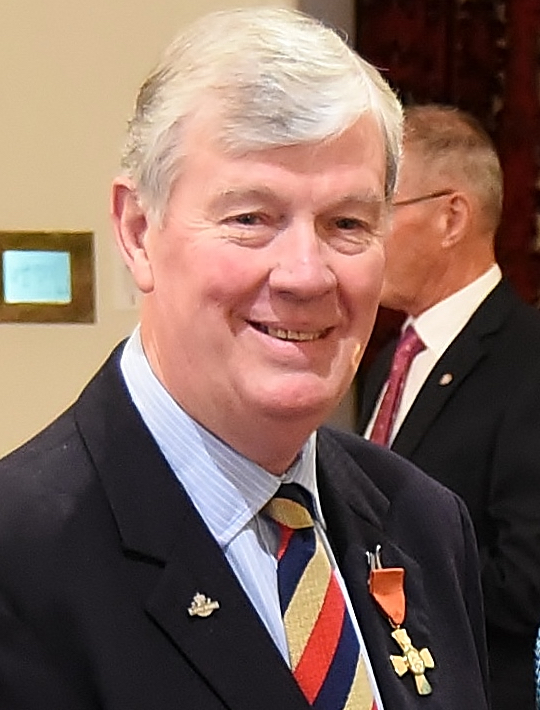
Roly Ellis

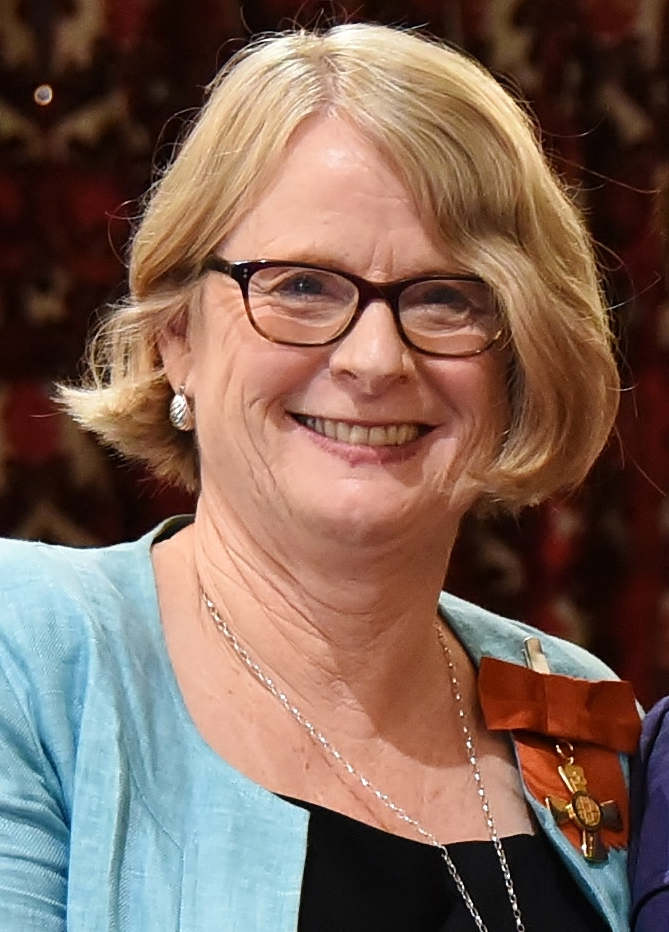
Jenny Gill

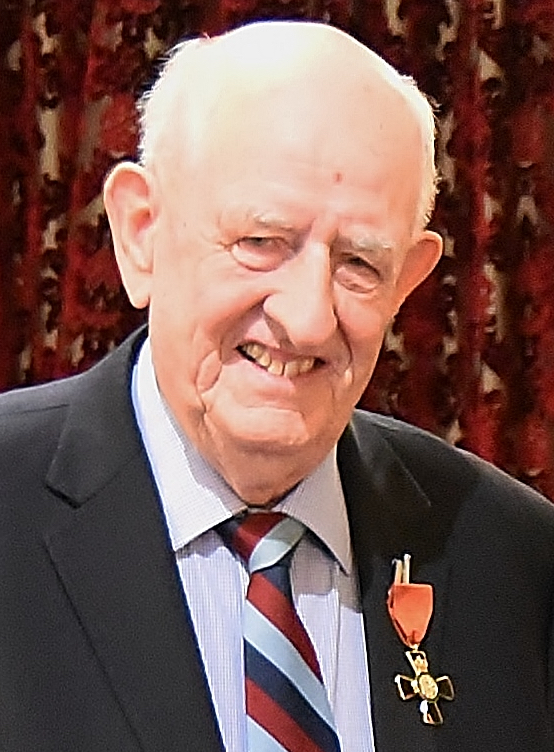
Durham Havill

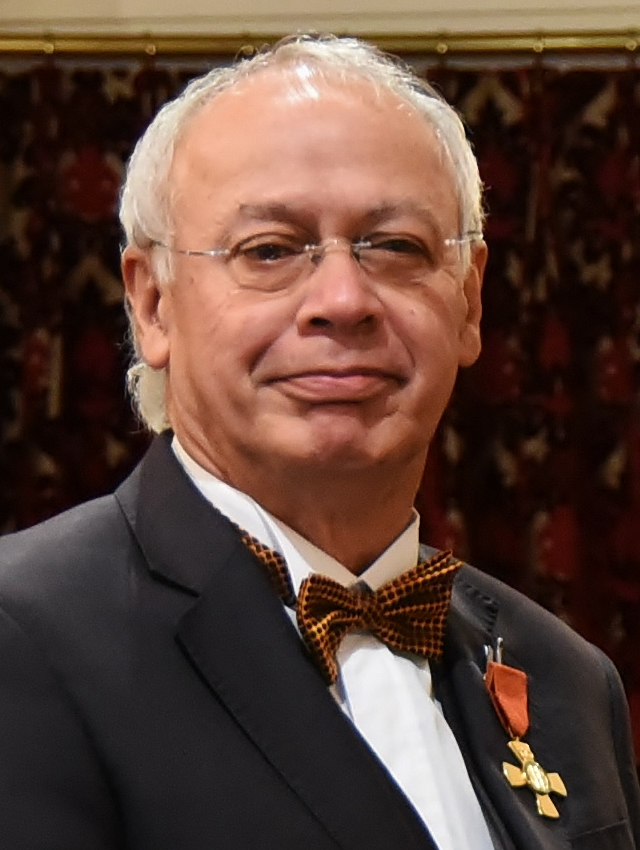
Bob Jahnke

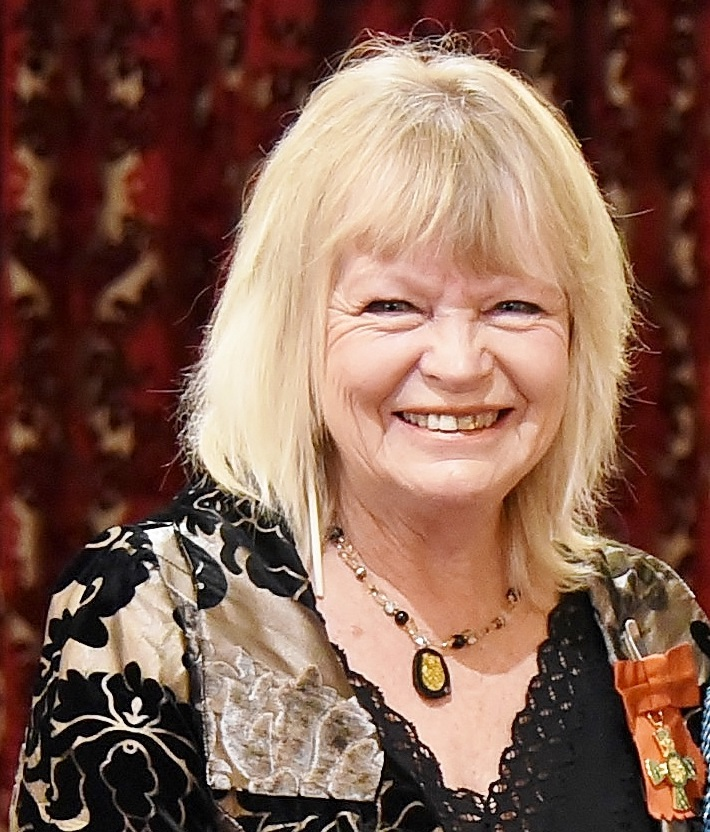
Annette Main

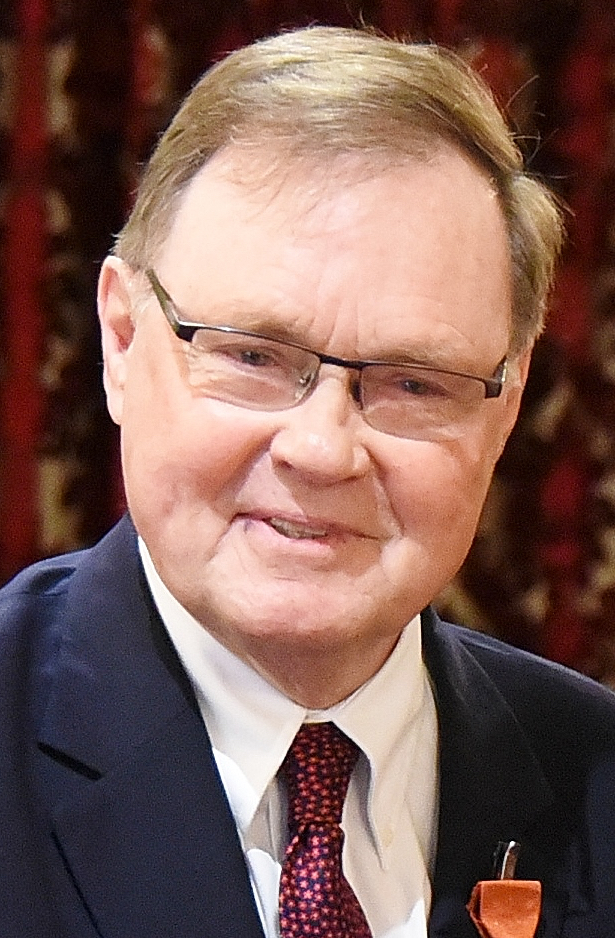
Donald McRae

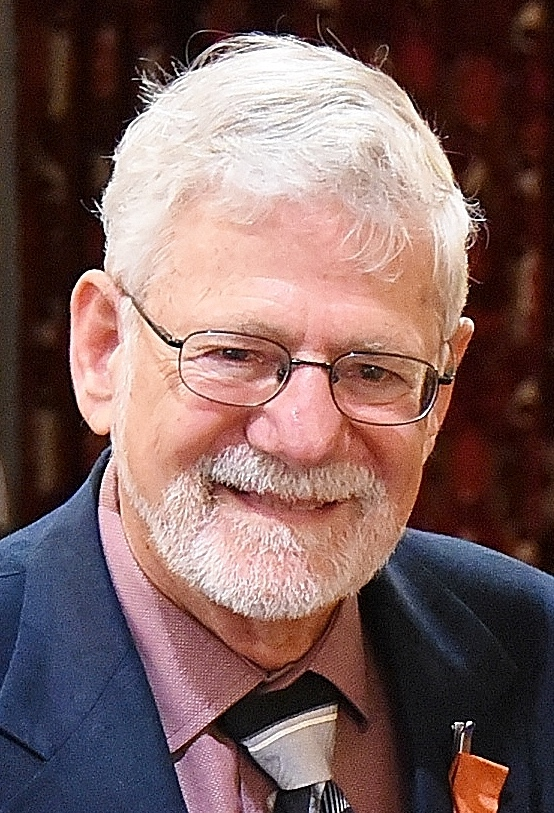
Barrie Osborne

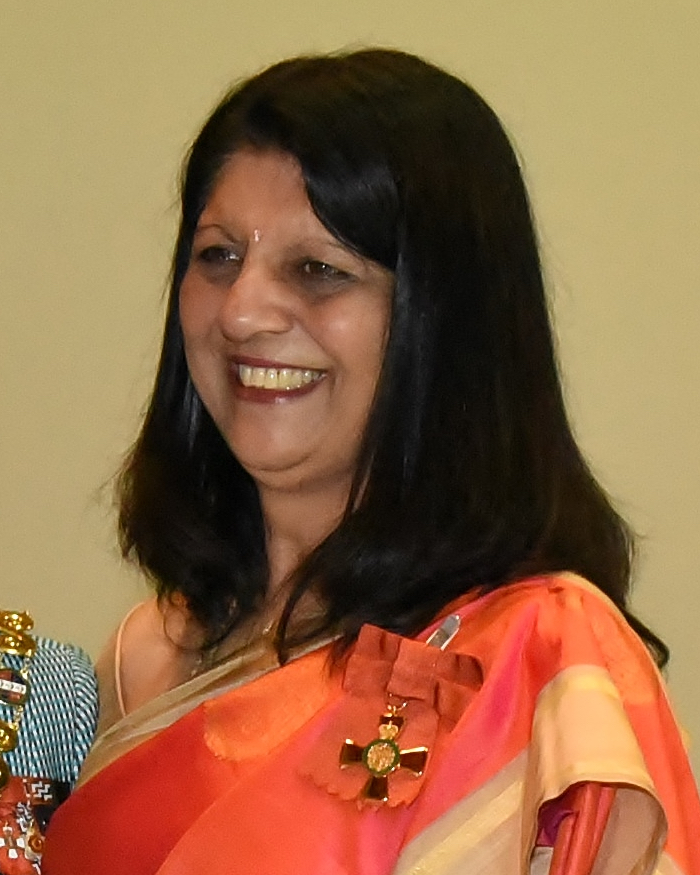
Ranjna Patel

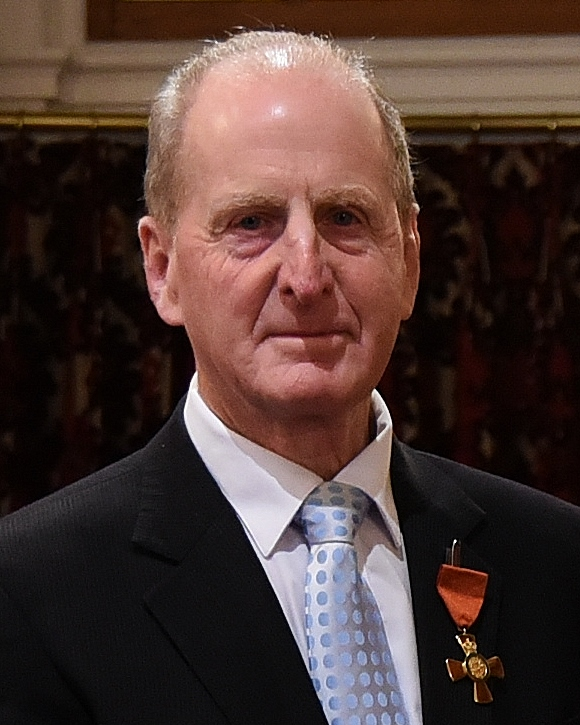
Ross Paterson

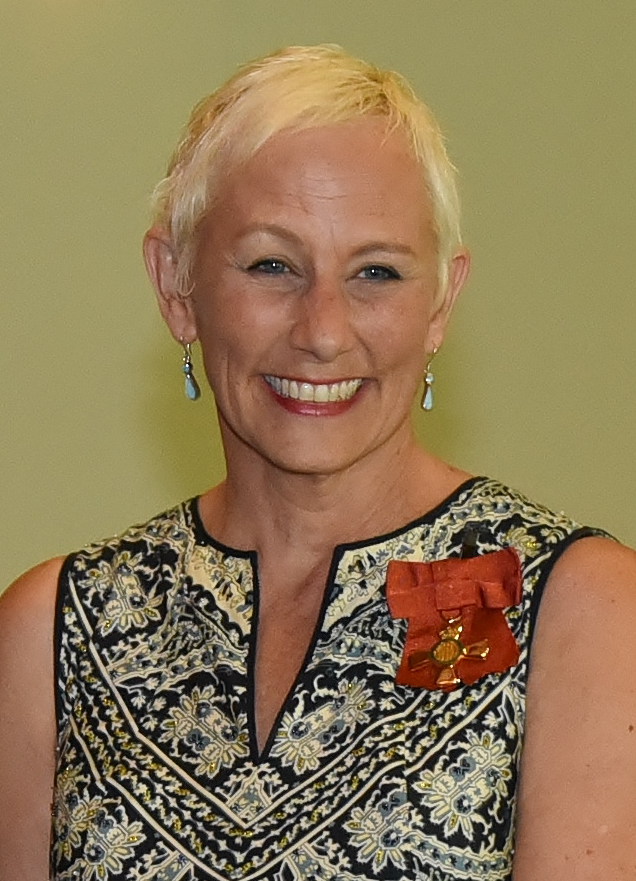
Leanne Pooley

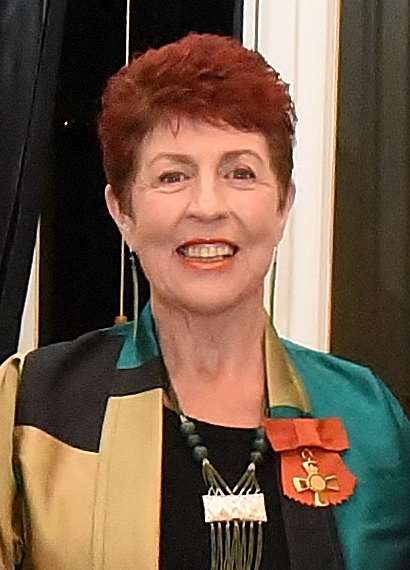
Gaylene Sciascia

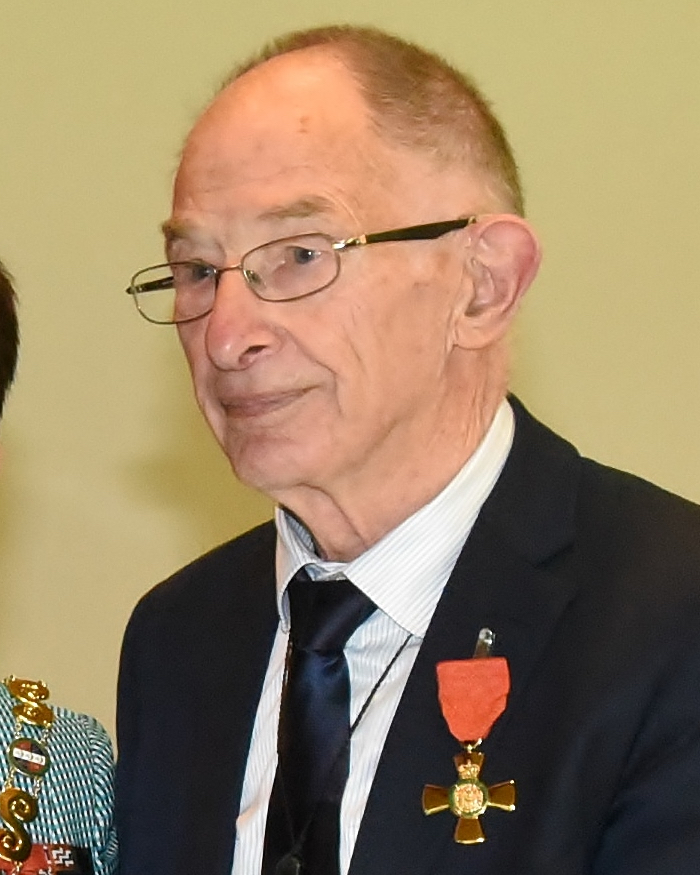
Neil Sinclair

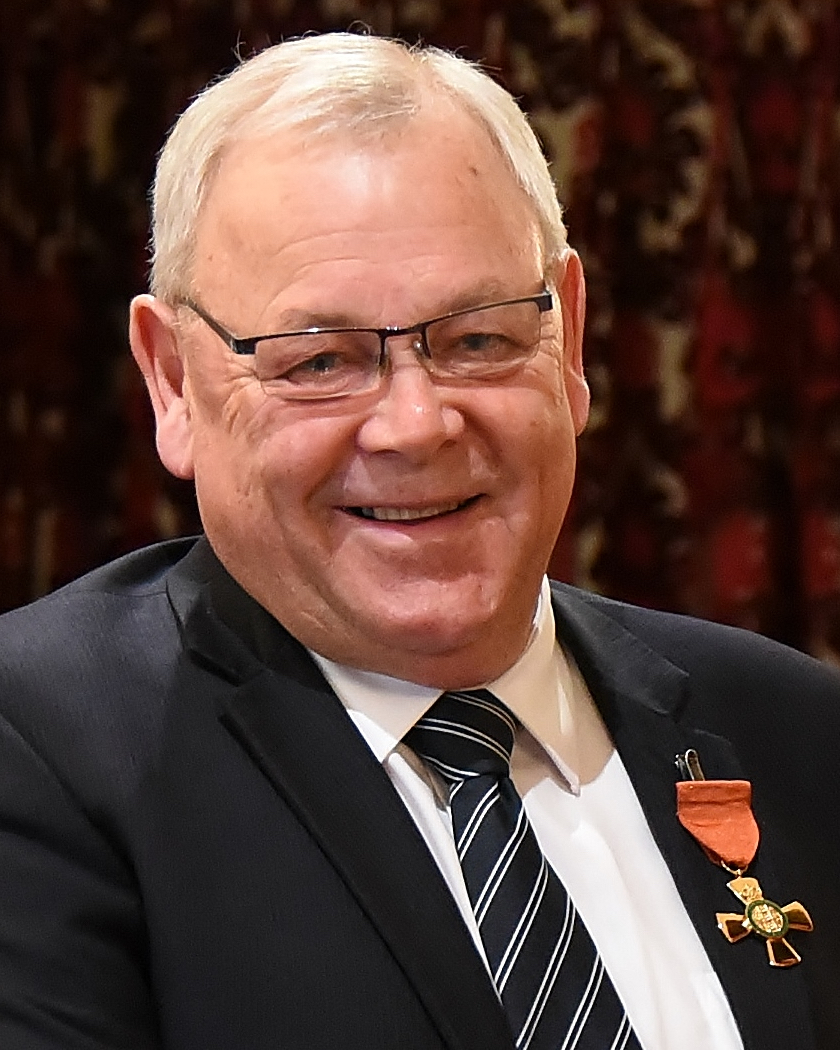
Alistair Sowman

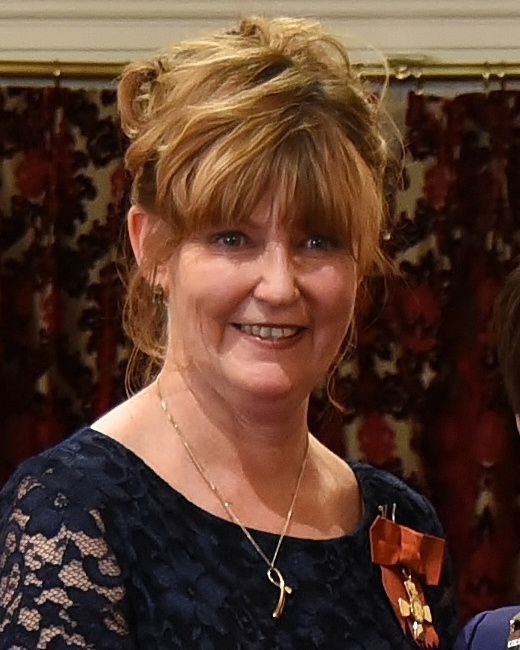
Adrienne Staples

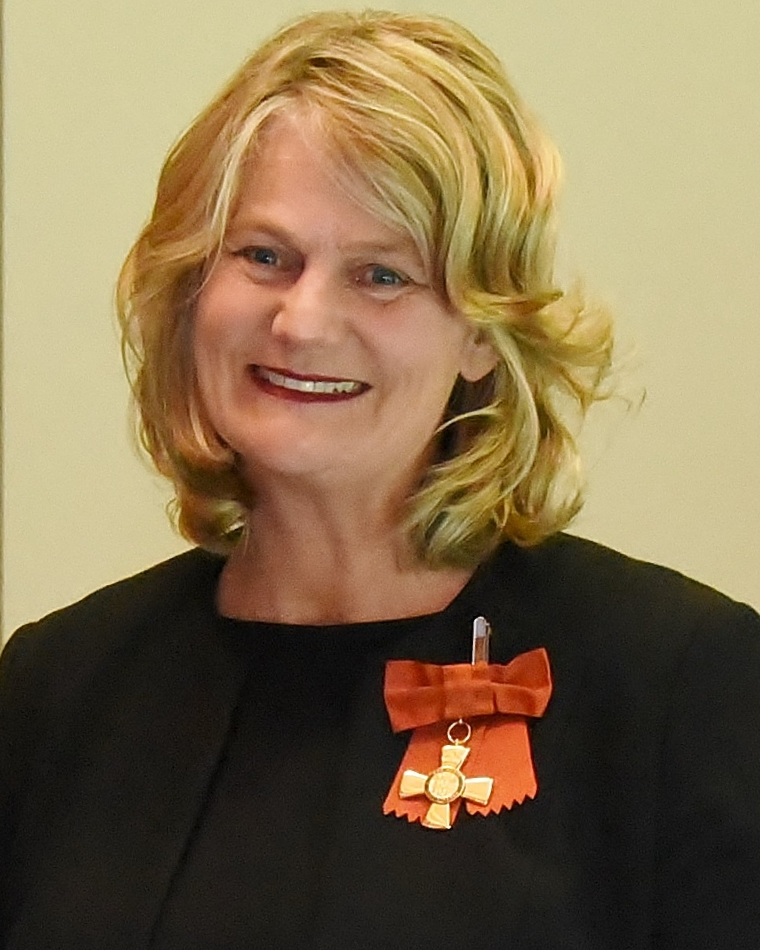
Sarah Trotman

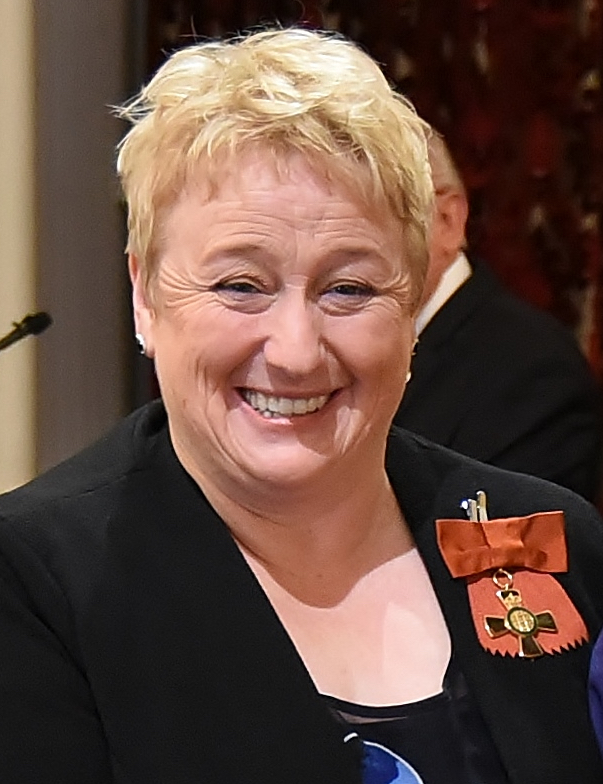
Vanessa van Uden

=== Member (MNZM) ===
- Alison Patricia Ballance – of Wellington. For services to natural history, filmmaking and broadcasting.
- Lisa Maree Bates – of Auckland. For services to the arts and philanthropy.
- Raylene Isabel Bates – of Mosgiel. For services to sport, particularly athletics.
- Ivan Francis Batistich – of Kaiapoi. For services to health and innovation.
- Eleanor Kay Baxter – of Wairoa. For services to conservation and sustainable food production.
- Jacqueline Lindsay Bay – of Auckland. For services to science and education.
- Marion Clare Blake – of Wellington. For services to people with mental health and addiction issues.
- Ross Brown – of Taupō. For services to education.
- Dr Stuart Whitaker Brown – of Hamilton. For services to children's health.
- Peter Burling – of Tauranga. For services to sailing.
- Phillip Burrows – of Melbourne, Australia. For services to hockey.
- Murray Graham Chandler – of Auckland. For services to chess.
- Lisa Choegyal – of Kathmandu, Nepal. For services to New Zealand–Nepal relations.
- Reuben Glenn Collier – of Rotorua. For services to the television industry and Māori.
- Jillian Corkin – of Mangawhai. For services to education.
- Lyall David Daines – of Blenheim. For services to rugby.
- Derek Doddington – of Christchurch. For services to theatre.
- Alan Dormer – of Auckland. For services to the law.
- Karen Lorraine Fifield – of Wellington. For services to business and animal welfare.
- Derek Sinclair Firth – of Auckland. For services to arbitration and education.
- Robert Edward Semadeni Fischer JP – of Hamilton. For services to road safety and the community.
- Katie Alexandra Glynn – of Auckland. For services to hockey.
- Dr Paula Joy Green – of Auckland. For services as a poet and to literature.
- Anna Grimaldi – of Dunedin. For services to athletics.
- Madeline Gunn – of Auckland. For services to education.
- Senior Constable Susan Jean Guy – of Napier. For services to the New Zealand Police and youth.
- Darrin Haimona – of Waharoa. For services to Māori and the arts.
- Bernadette Hall – of Amberley. For services to literature.
- Caroline Marjorie Herewini – of Porirua. For services to women.
- John Heyes – of Auckland. For services to education.
- Robyn Hickman – of Invercargill. For services to education.
- Anthony Evan Hill – of Queenstown. For services to the community, disability sport and health.
- Katherine Horan – of Wellington. For services to Paralympic sport.
- Nikita Stevie Howarth – of Cambridge. For services to swimming.
- Ernest John Haines Howat – of Lower Hutt. For services to shooting sports.
- Hewitt Royden Humphrey QSM JP – of Wellington. For services as a broadcaster and to the community.
- Dr John Chirnside Hyndman – of Kaiapoi. For services to health and innovation.
- Lyndsay Louise James – of Auckland. For services to people with cancer.
- Chunli Li – of Auckland. For services to table tennis.
- Huei Min Lim – of Auckland. For services to New Zealand–Asia relations and governance.
- Judith Roberta Macready – of Auckland. For services to hospice care.
- Liam Malone – of Nelson. For services to athletics.
- Professor Anthony Phillip Mann – of Wellington. For services to literature and drama.
- Dr Donald Alastair McDonald – of Havelock North. For services to rowing.
- Terence James McNamara – of Auckland. For services to the arts.
- Terence Valentine Parkes – of New Plymouth. For services to the arts, business and the community.
- Owen Leslie Pickles JP – of the Chatham Islands. For services to local government.
- Tangiwai Margaret Ria – of Gisborne. For services to Māori performing arts and the community.
- Sergeant Susan Jane Robinson – of Hastings. For services to the New Zealand Police and youth.
- Nahusita Selupe – of Auckland. For services to education and Māori and pacific communities.
- Elizabeth Mason Sinclair – of Waikanae. For services to the State.
- Benesia Denise Smith – of Christchurch. For services to the State.
- Desmond Gerald Smith – of Dunedin. For services to rugby and the community.
- John Maurice Takarangi – of Palmerston North. For services to Māori.
- Heather Rima Te Wiata – of Auckland. For services to film and television.
- Professor Keith Gordon Thompson – of Feilding. For services to veterinary pathology.
- Andrew Blair Tuke – of Kerikeri. For services to sailing.
- Alison Thelma Wilkie – of Christchurch. For services to health and education.
- Lynda Christine Williams – of Auckland. For services to women's health.
- Jason Wynyard – of Auckland. For services to the sport of wood chopping.

Honorary

- Jae-chul Kim – of Seoul, Republic of Korea. For services to New Zealand–South Korea relations.
- Hiroshi Masumoto – of Chiba, Japan. For services to New Zealand–Japan relations and music.
- Dr William Brown McIlvaine Randall – of Auckland. For services to museum governance.
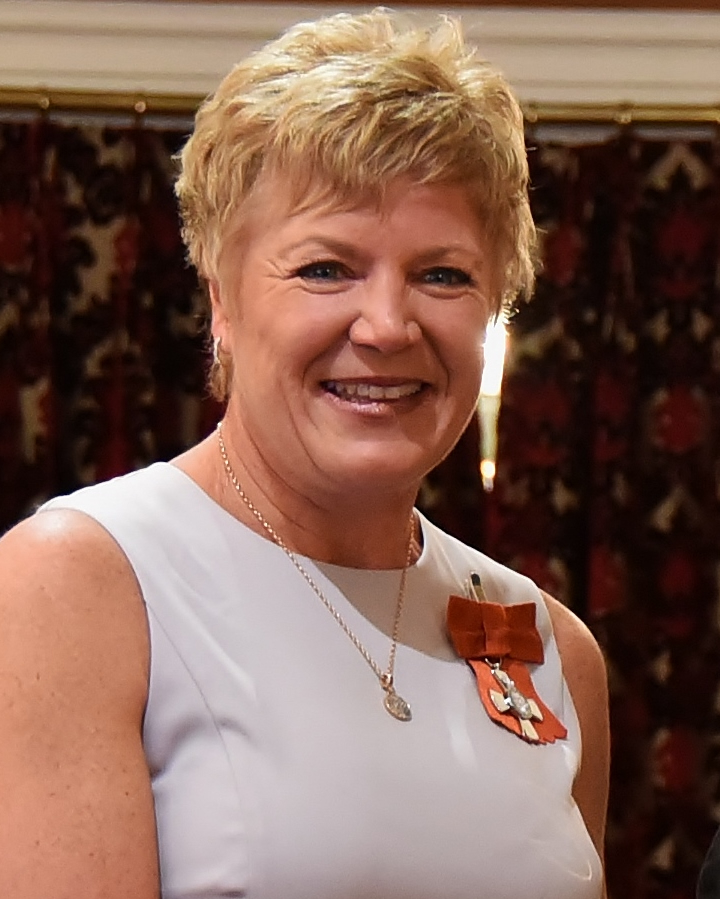
Raylene Bates

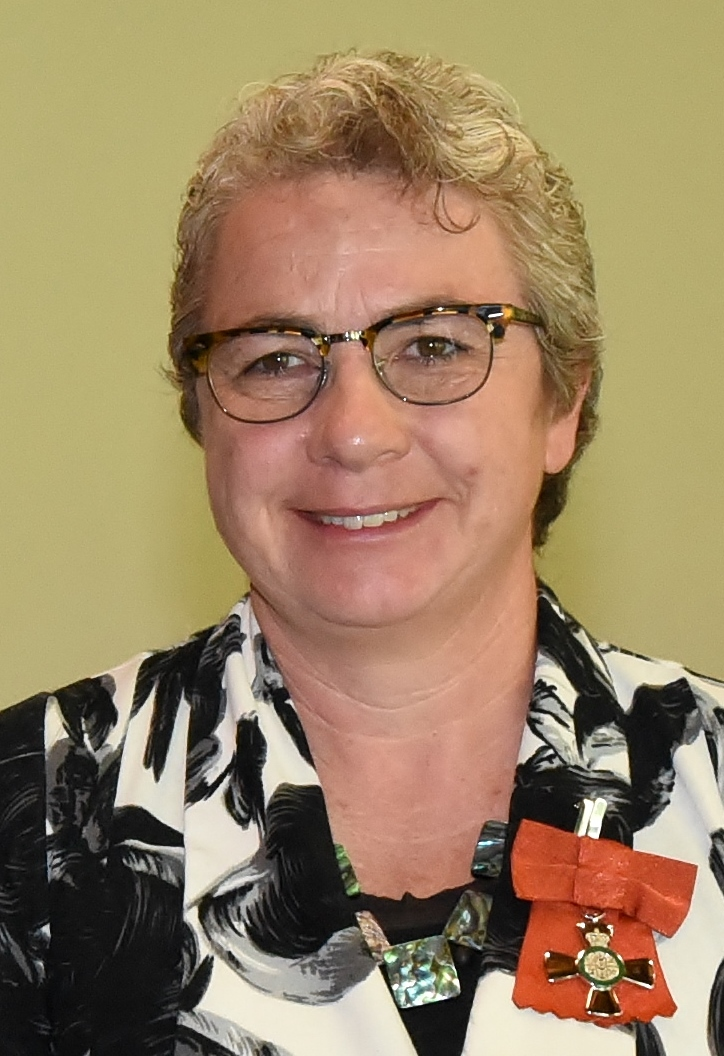
Jacquie Bay

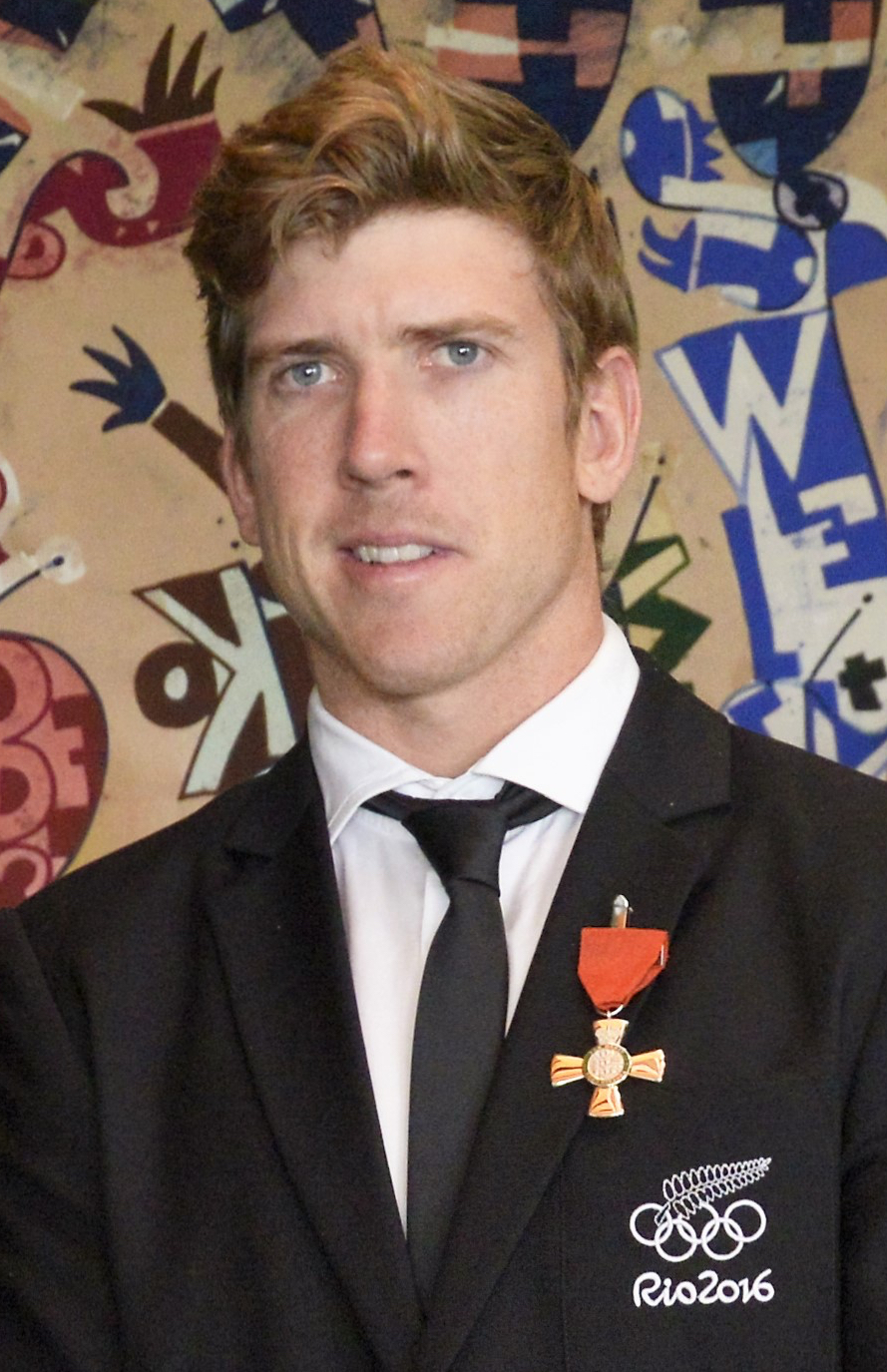
Peter Burling

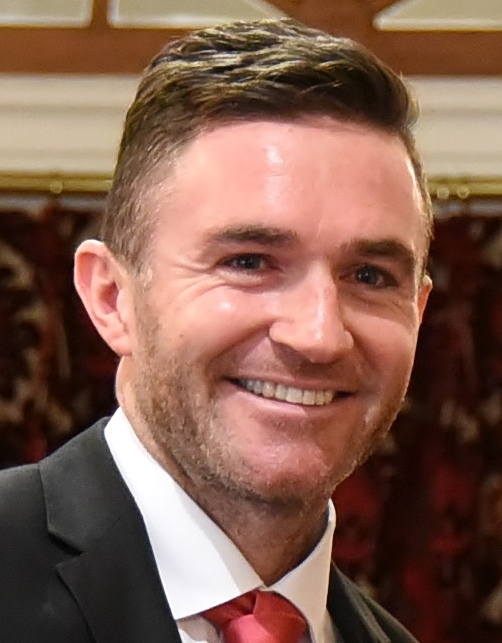
Phil Burrows

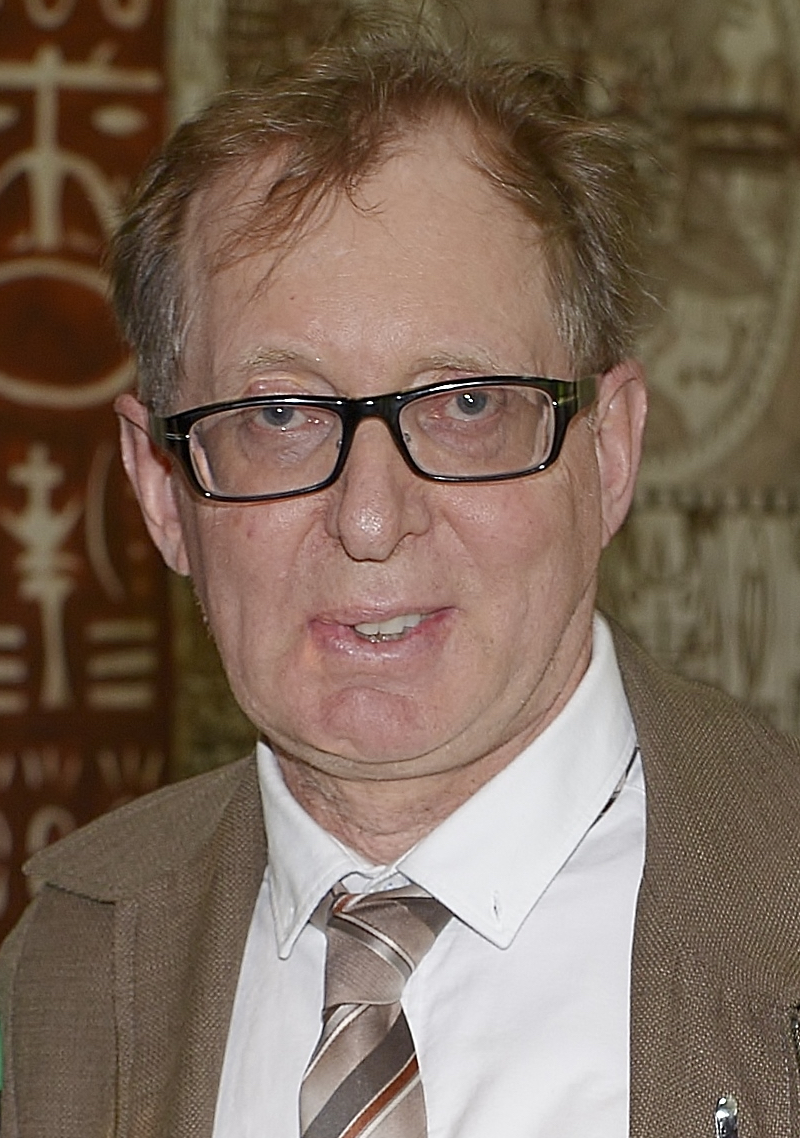
Murray Chandler

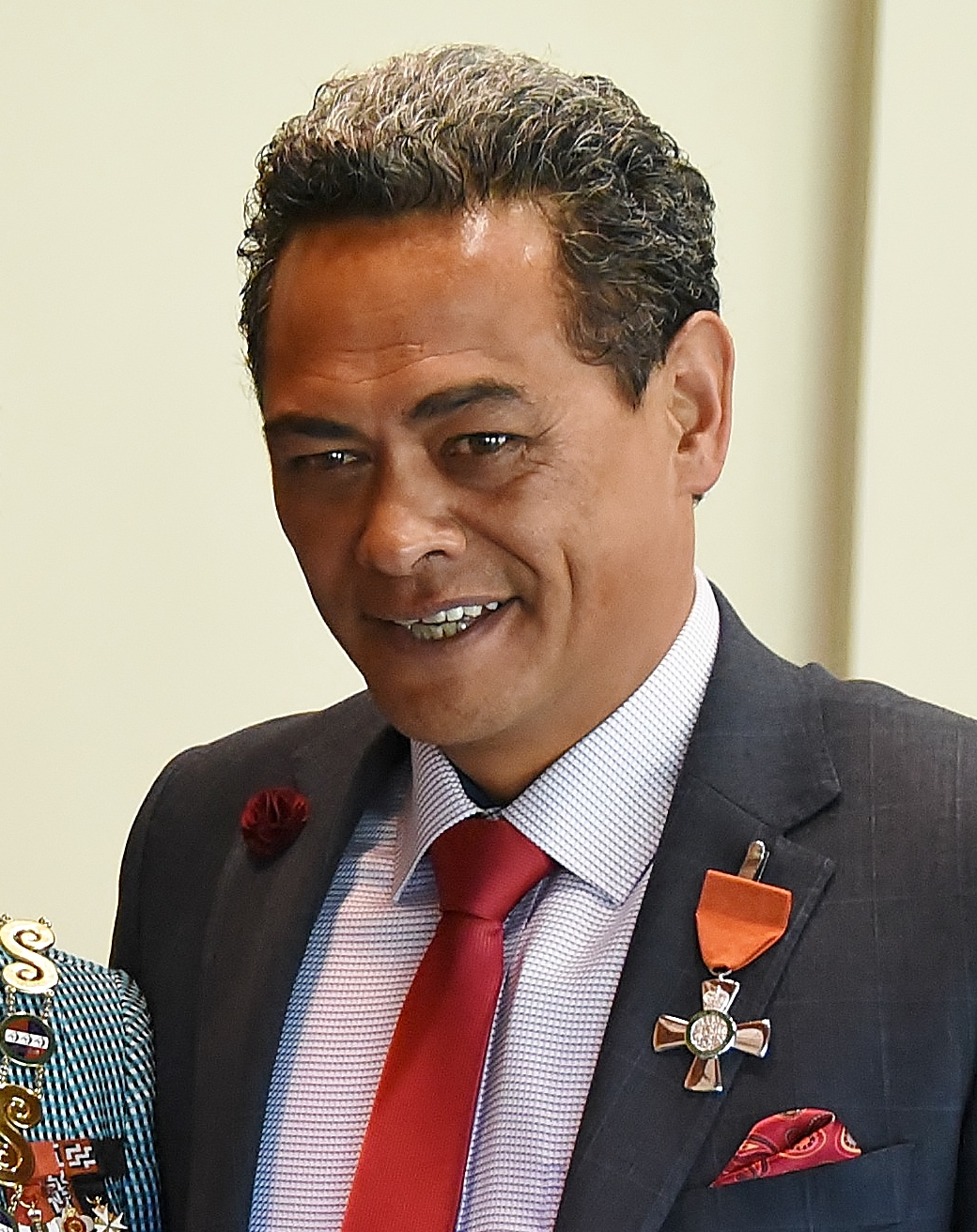
Reuben Collier

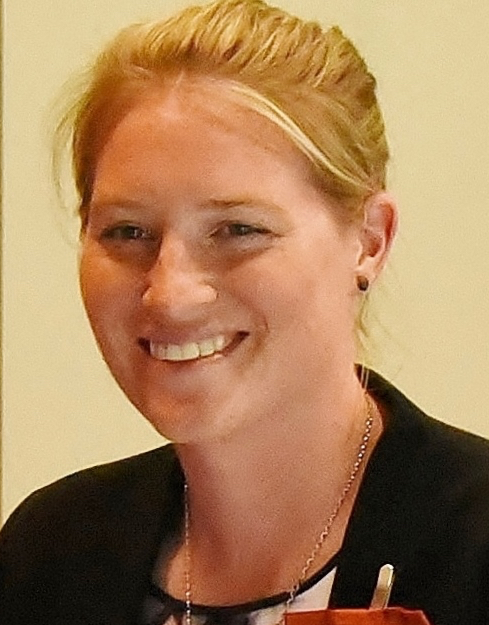
Katie Glynn

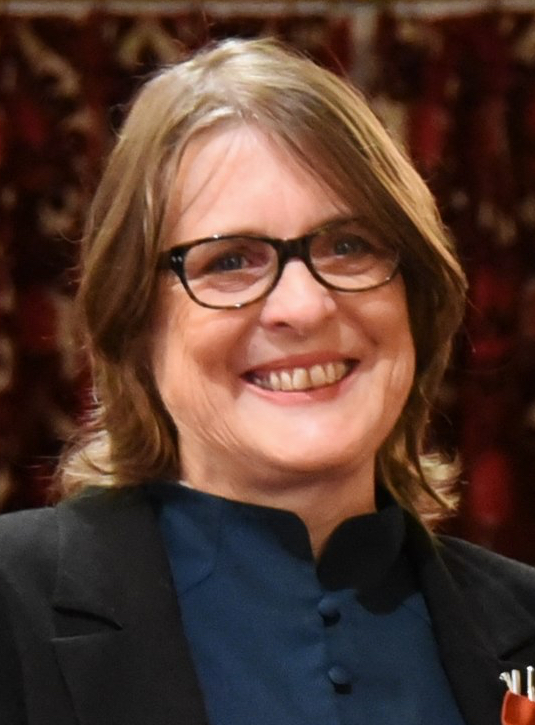
Paula Green

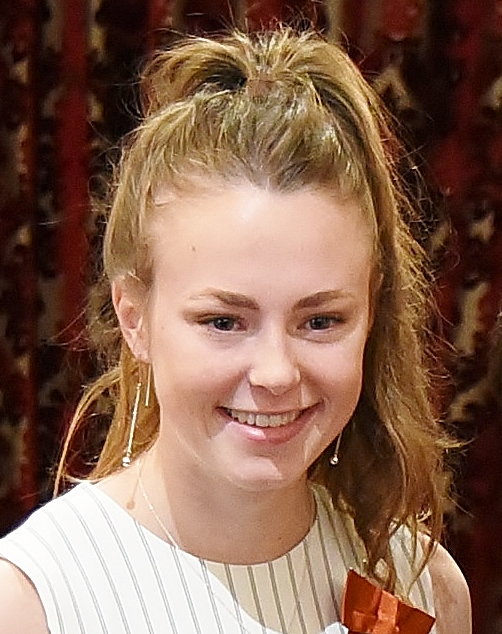
Anna Grimaldi

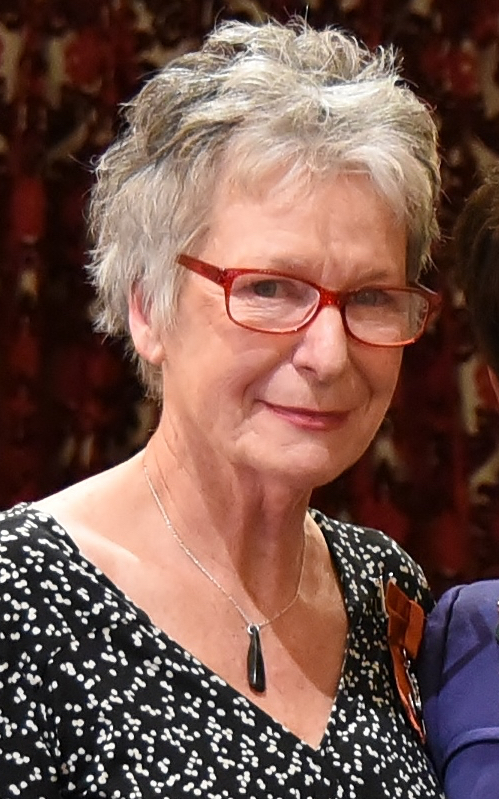
Bernadette Hall

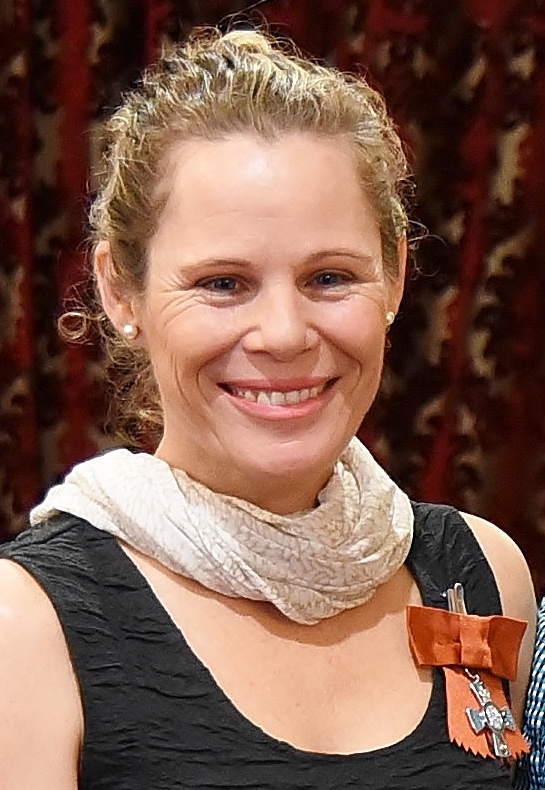
Kate Horan

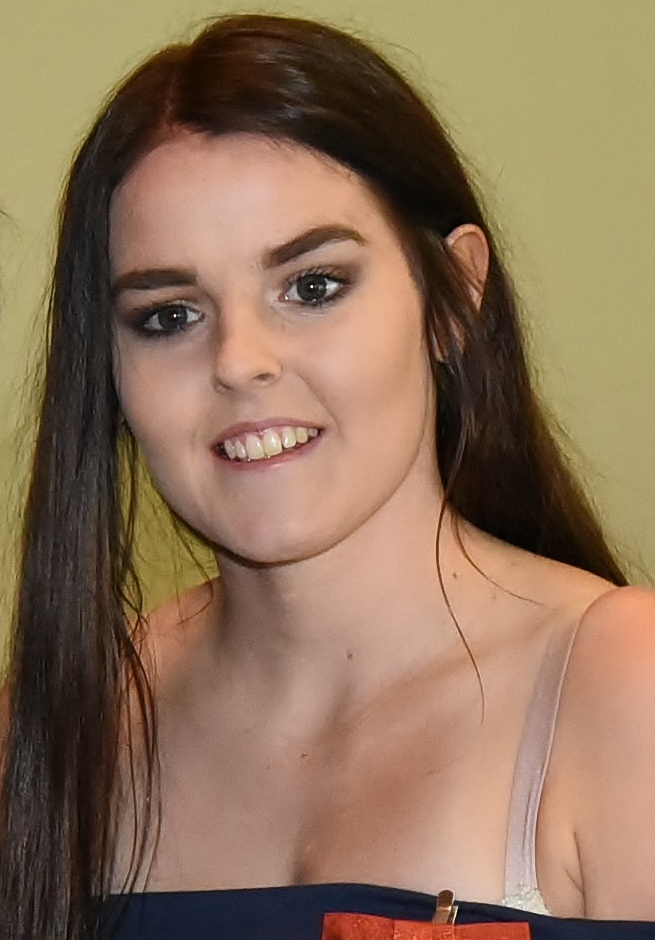
Nikita Howarth

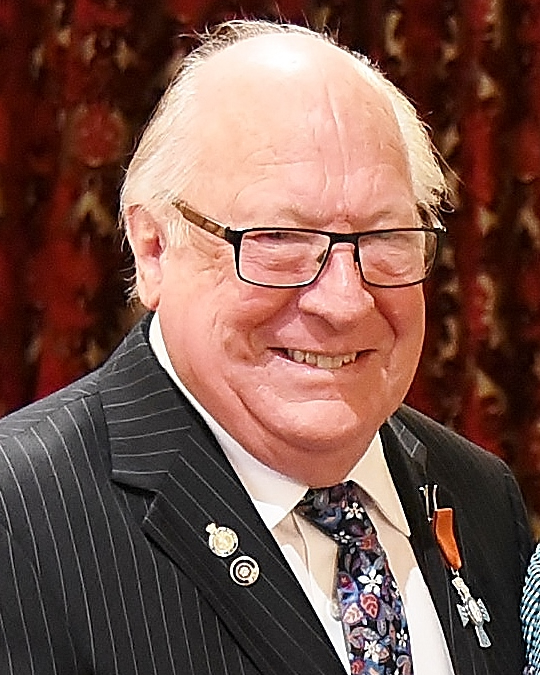
Hewitt Humphrey

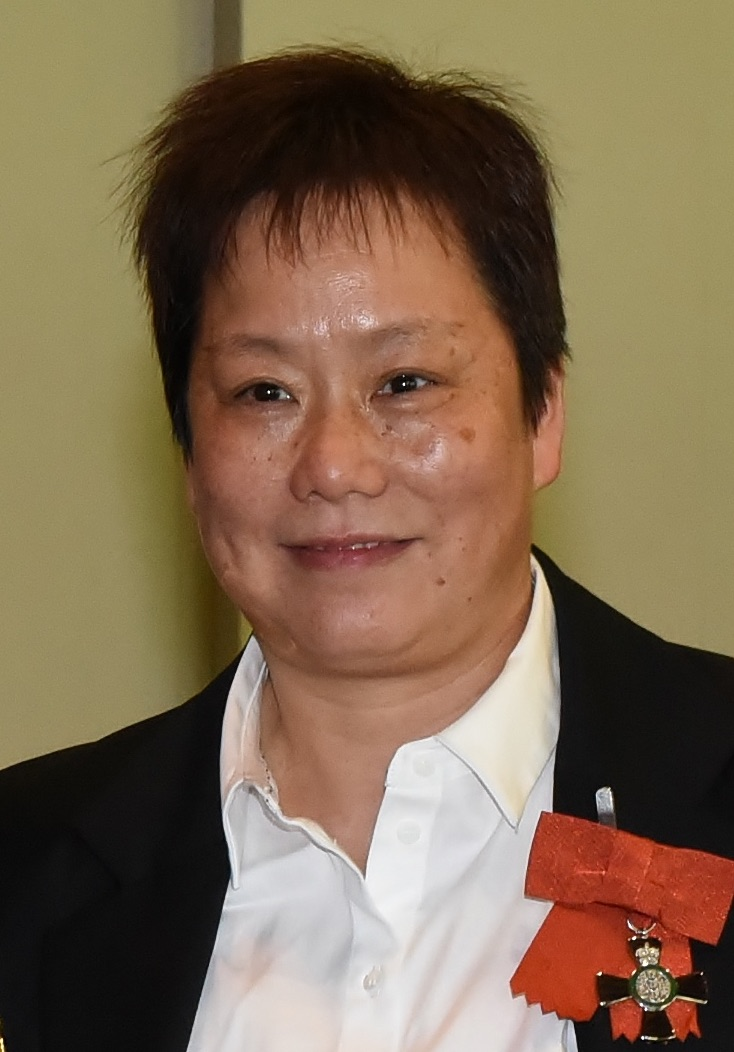
Chunli Li

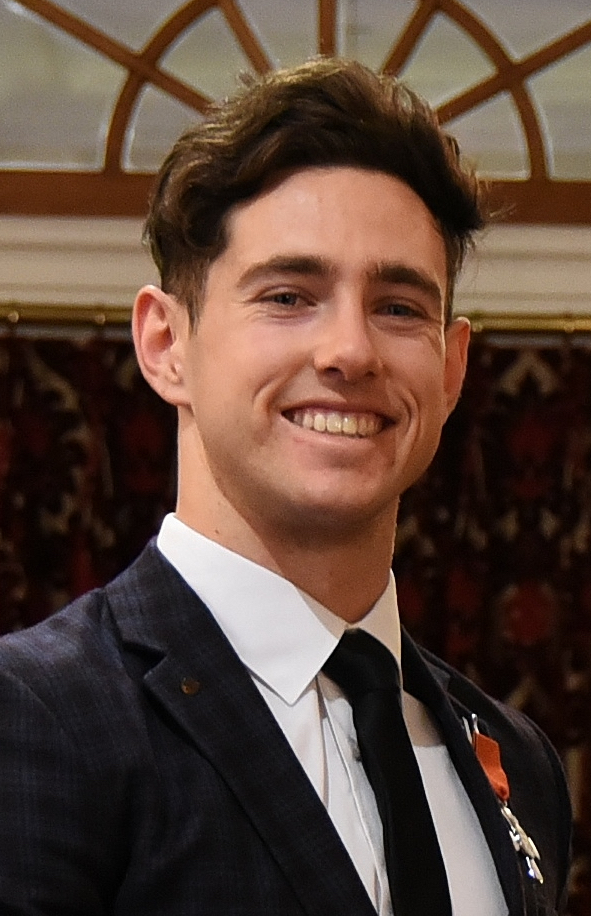
Liam Malone

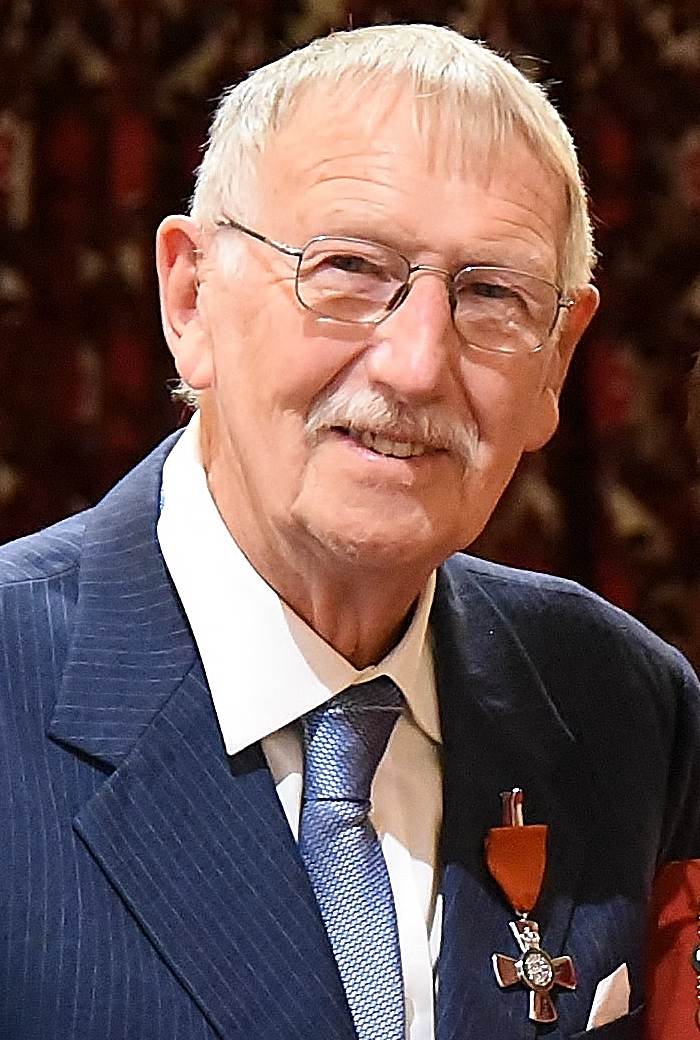
Phillip Mann

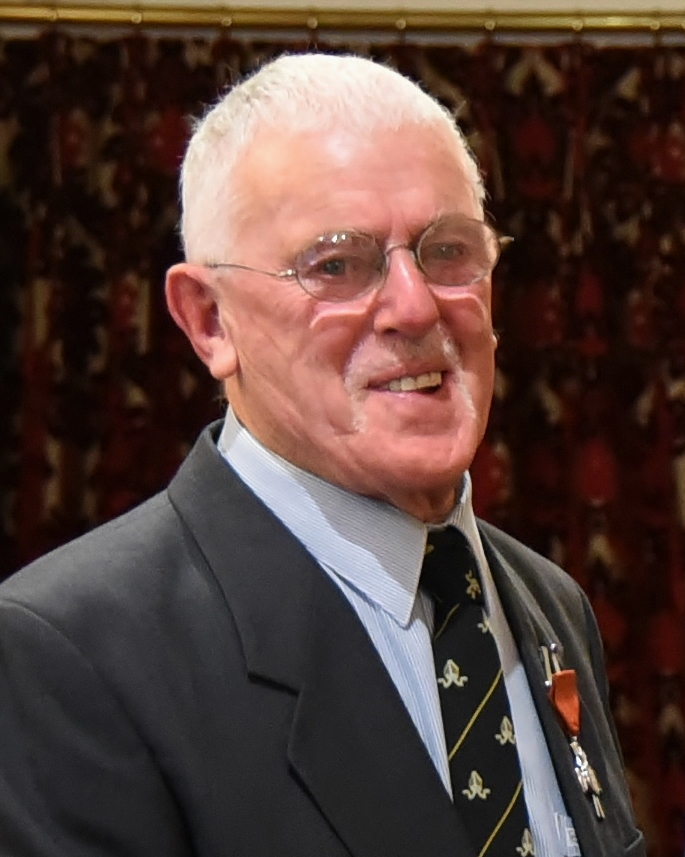
Don McDonald

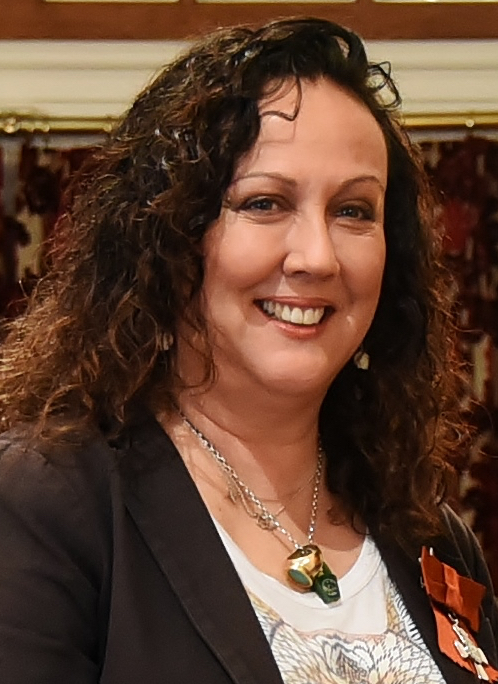
Rima Te Wiata

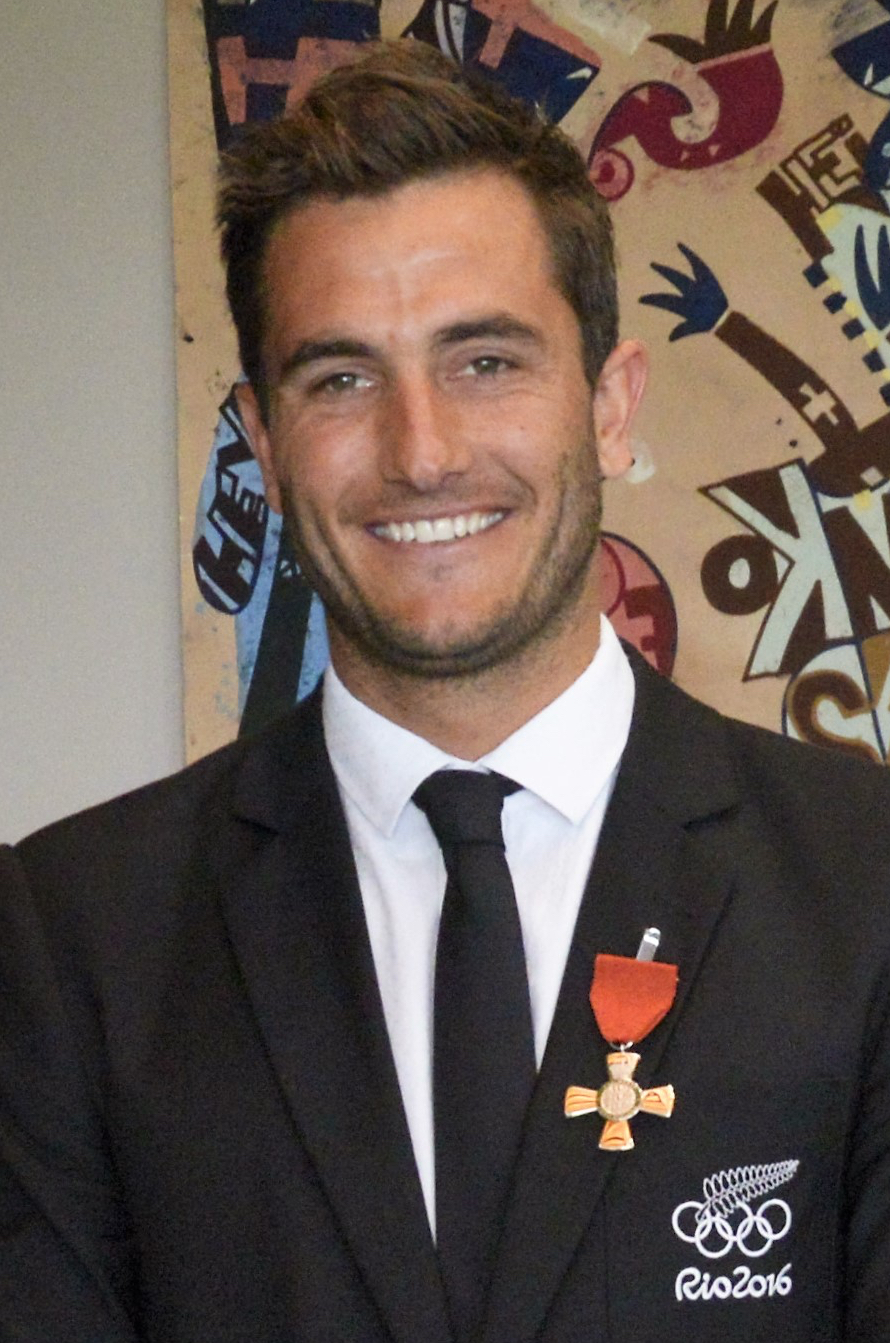
Blair Tuke

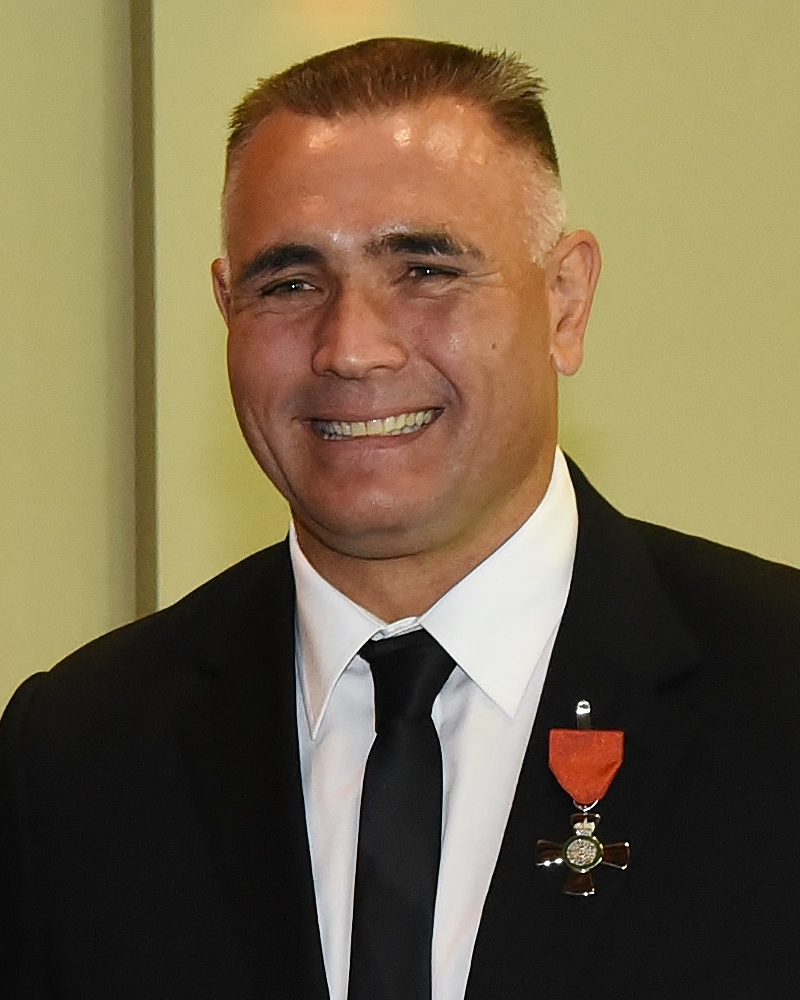
Jason Wynyard

== Companion of the Queen's Service Order (QSO) ==
- Alastair Miles Bisley – of Wellington. For services to the State.
- Judge Charles Stuart Blackie VRD – of Auckland. For services to the judiciary and the community.
- Joel Patrick Bolton – of Nelson. For services to music.
- Richard Gerald McElrea – of Christchurch. For services as a coroner and to Antarctic heritage.
- Diane Marguerite Vivian – of Auckland. For services to seniors and youth.
- Celia Margaret Wade-Brown – of Wellington. For services to local government.
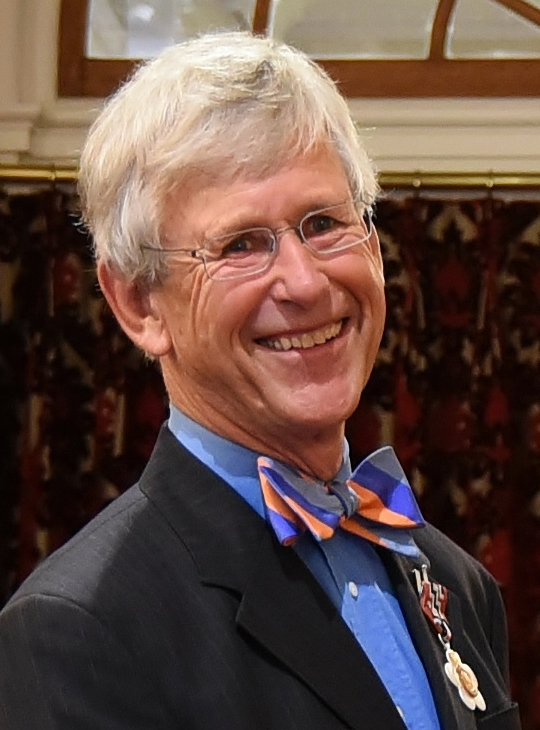
Alastair Bisley

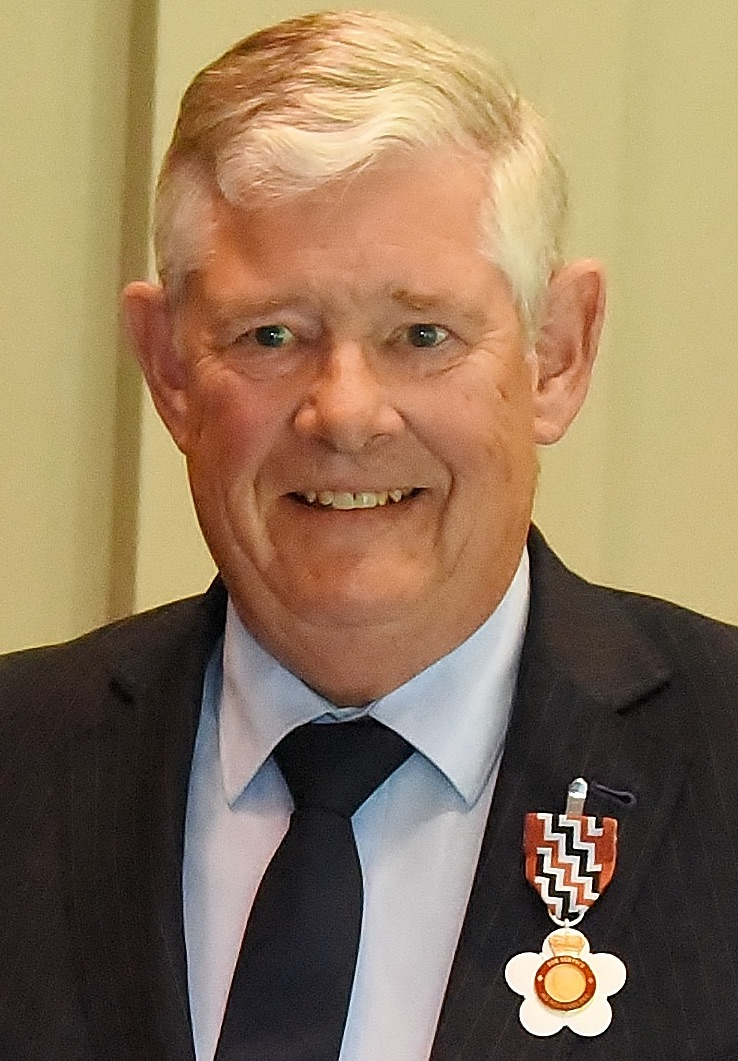
Charles Blackie

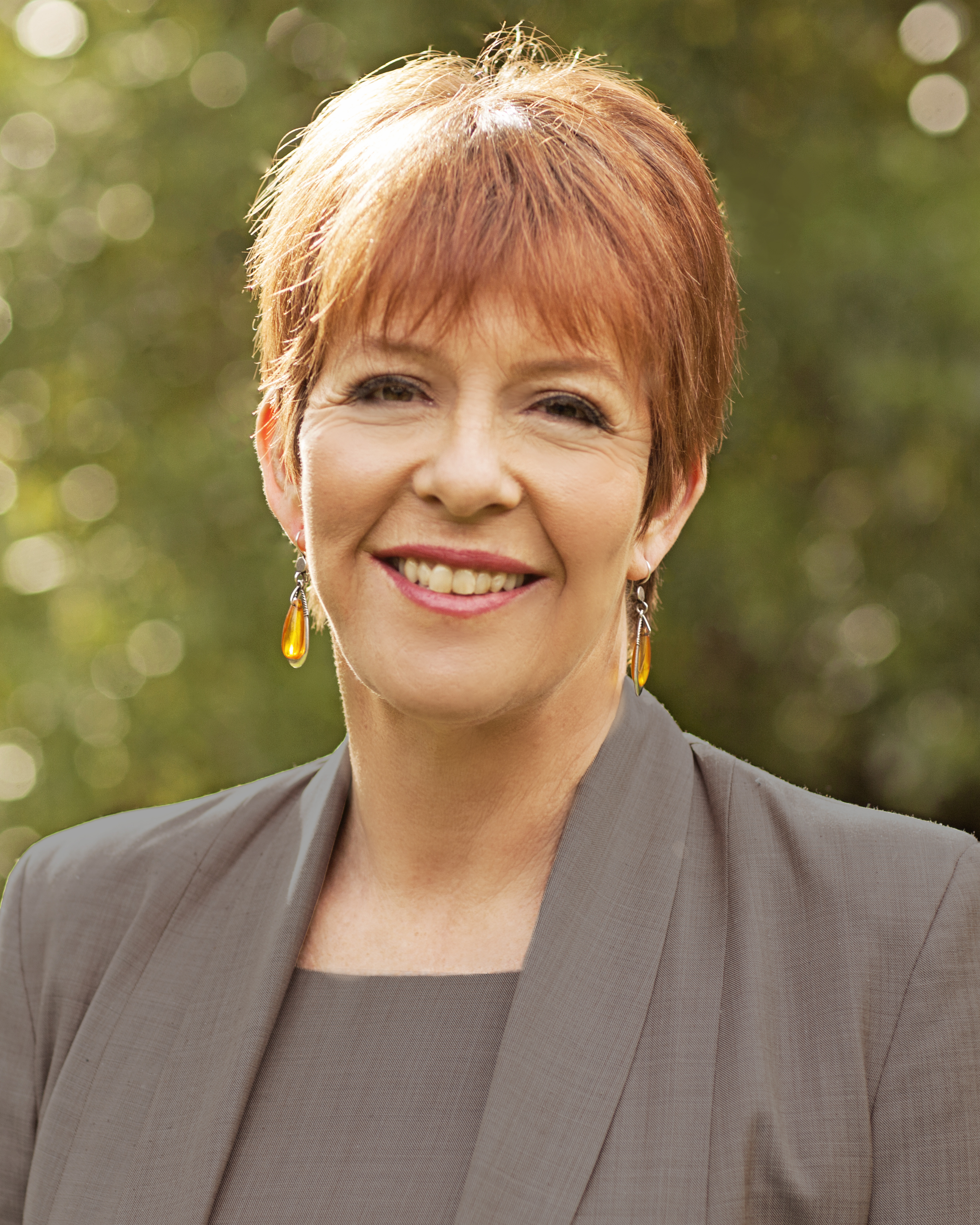
Celia Wade-Brown

== Queen's Service Medal (QSM) ==
- Janet Margaret Affleck OStJ – of Gore. For services as an ambulance officer.
- Bryan Ernest Barker – of Morrinsville. For services to the community.
- Lyall George Beuth JP – of Ōhope. For services to the community.
- Basil Edwin Brooker – of Hastings. For services to music.
- John Charles Cawston – of Rotorua. For services to people with multiple sclerosis.
- Nicky Christie – of Wellington. For services to the Greek community.
- Victor Rex Claude – of Christchurch. For services to the care of children.
- Neville Raymond Cowles – of Oamaru. For services to music.
- Alice Katene Doorbar – of Waitara. For services to health and Māori.
- Maurice Eldred Doughty – of Mangawhai. For services to the New Zealand Fire Service.
- Ngaire Jean Duke – of Dunedin. For services to the community.
- Janet Rosemary Falconer – of Auckland. For services to children with cancer.
- Keith Warren Feek – of Matamata. For services to the New Zealand Fire Service.
- Kevin James Damer Geddes JP – of Ashburton. For services to agriculture and the community.
- Claire Gianotti – of Taupō. For services to people with disabilities and the community.
- Kerri Graham – of Lower Hutt. For services to youth.
- Elizabeth Kiri Gray – of Cambridge. For services to the community.
- Geoffrey Harrow – of Christchurch. For services to mountaineering and conservation.
- Dr Siu Kai Haslam – of Levin. For services to the Chinese community and horticulture.
- David Richardson Hosking – of Te Kauwhata. For services to the community.
- Sandra Ibbotson – of Napier. For services to the community.
- James Gerard Jefferies – of Palmerston North. For services to local government, theatre and business.
- William Bruce Johnston – of Wellington. For services to scouting and the community.
- Dr James Richard Paul Kay – of Te Awamutu. For services to polo.
- Lynn Lamb – of Masterton. For services to equestrian sport.
- Graham Leslie – of Christchurch. For services to education. (Note: Deceased. Her Majesty's approval of this award took effect on 21 December 2016, prior to the date of decease.)
- Lois Anita Livingston – of Hamilton. For services to local government and the arts. (Note: Deceased. Her Majesty's approval of this award took effect on 19 November 2016, prior to the date of decease.)
- Charles Murray Loewenthal JP – of Ōtorohanga. For services to health and the community.
- Paul Leonard Lyall – of Levin. For services to the New Zealand Fire Service.
- Catherine Flora MacDonald – of Gisborne. For services to music.
- John Phillip May – of Lower Hutt. For services to the New Zealand Fire Service and the community.
- Karen May – of Cambridge. For services to the community.
- Francis Frederick McGuire – of Blackball. For services to the New Zealand Fire Service.
- Rosemary Jean McKay – of Levin. For services to athletics and the community.
- Maata McManus – of Hamilton. For services to Māori and health.
- Margaret Jane McRae – of Auckland. For services to heritage preservation.
- Shirley Ann Miles – of Nelson. For services to charity fundraising.
- Rongokino George Ngatai – of Auckland. For services to Māori and the community.
- Arthur Pacey – of Blenheim. For services to rugby and the community.
- Lieutenant Commander Gerard Thomas Purcell JP RNZN (Rtd.) – of Katikati. For services to youth and outdoor education.
- Frances Randle – of Taihape. For services to senior citizens and the community.
- Thomas Richard Roper – of Tauranga. For services to the community.
- Peter Ewan Rutherford – of Thames. For services to people with disabilities.
- Rasy Sao JP – of Christchurch. For services to the Cambodian community.
- Rosemary Angela Scully – of Dunedin. For services to people with intellectual disabilities.
- Margaret Annette, Lady Spring – of Matamata. For services to governance and health.
- Barbara Joan Stewart – of Rotorua. For services to youth and education.
- The Reverend Peter Brian Sykes – of Auckland. For services to the community.
- Gilbert Melvyn Timms – of Palmerston North. For services to agriculture and the community.
- Herita Rita Toko – of Whakatāne. For services to Māori and education.
- Alan George Trott – of Ashburton. For services to horticulture.
- Reverend Pelu Tuai – of Auckland. For services to the Pacific community.
- Doreen Alison Tucker – of Dunedin. For services to netball.
- John Webster – of Oamaru. For services to irrigation and the community.
- Eric Gordon Weir – of Waverley. For services to the community.
- Helen Gail McDonald Willberg – of Lower Hutt. For services to music.
- Dorothy-Anne Wilson – of Ōpōtiki. For services to the arts and the community.
- Henry Peter Yarrell – of Picton. For services to sport.
- Walter Mick George Yovich – of Whangārei. For services to the community.
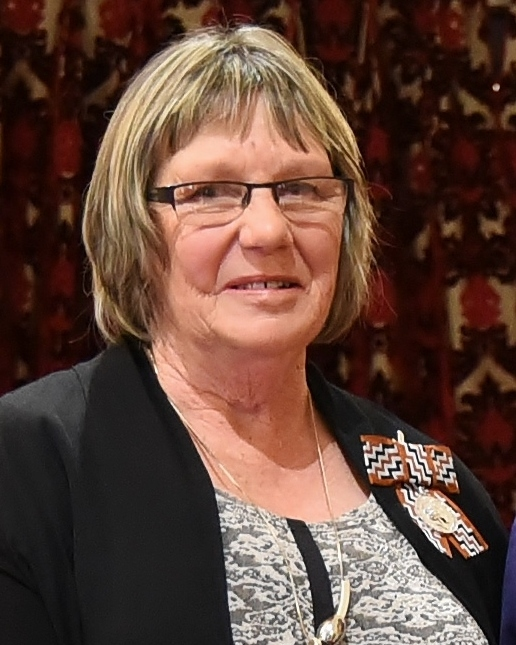
Janet Affleck

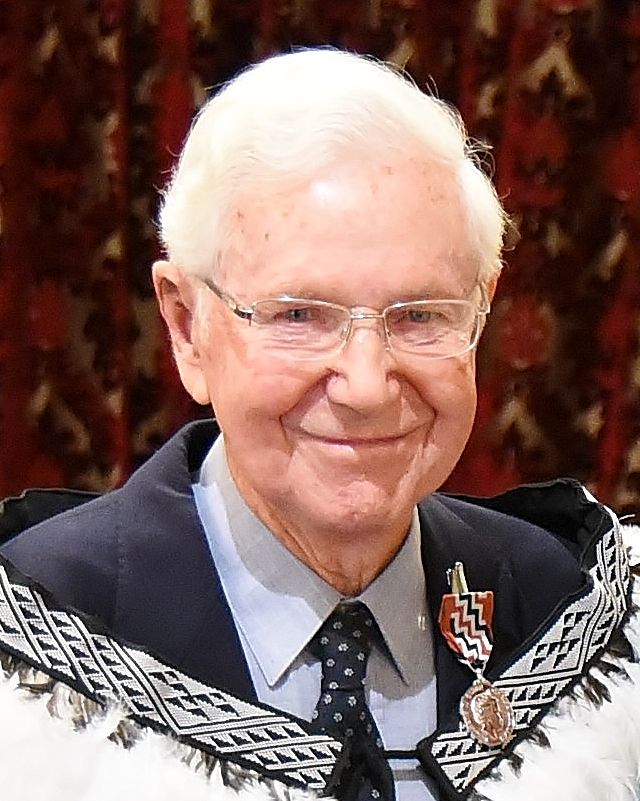
Geoff Harrow

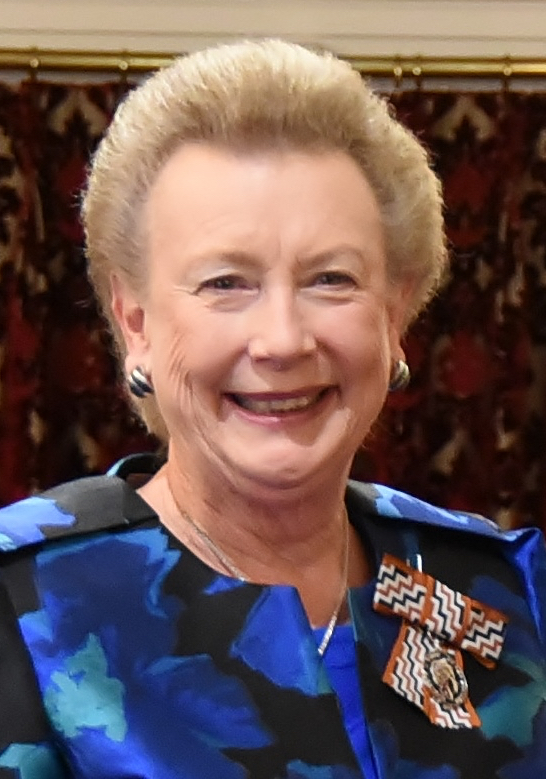
Margaret, Lady Spring

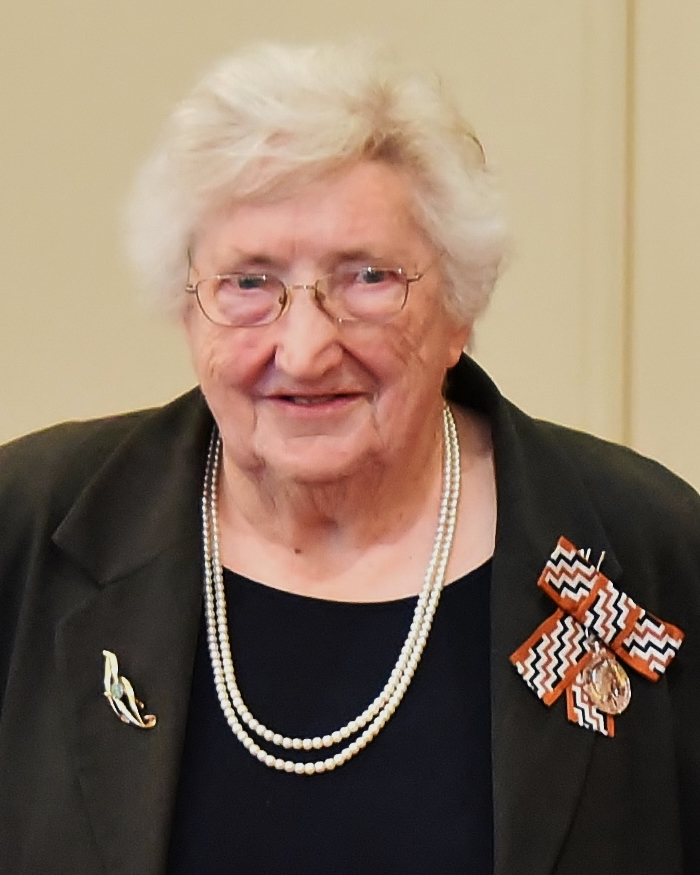
Doreen Tucker

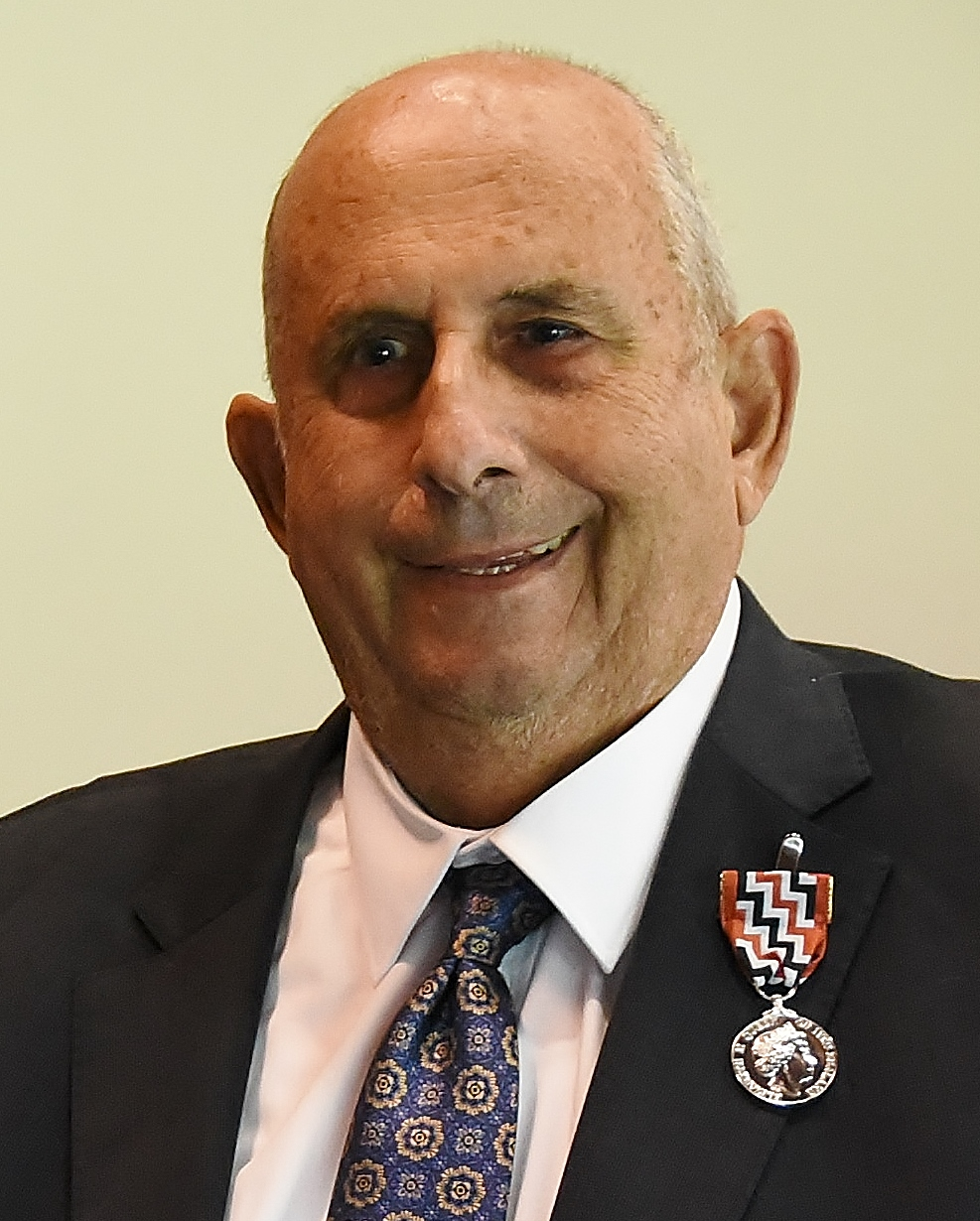
Wally Yovich

== New Zealand Distinguished Service Decoration (DSD) ==
- Major Graham Ross Hickman – of Christchurch. For services to the New Zealand Defence Force and brass bands.
