= Naomi Ballantyne =

New Zealand insurance executive

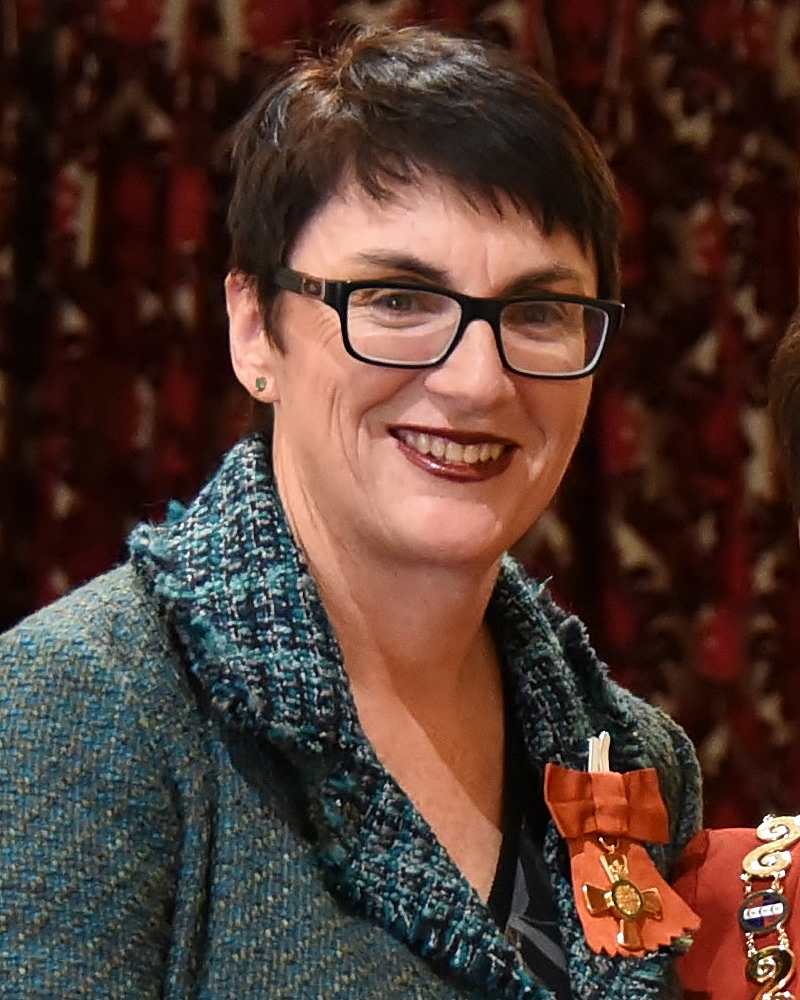
Ballantyne in 2017

Naomi Eunice Ballantyne ONZM is a New Zealand insurance executive.

== Biography ==
Ballantyne grew up in Glenfield on Auckland's North Shore with four brothers; her father was from Canada and her mother from Tonga. She began studying marine biology at university but did not continue with the degree. At the age of 19, she instead took a position as a trainee in an insurance company.

Ballantyne was a founding employee of Sovereign Insurance, and rose to become the company's chief operating officer. She left the company after it was sold to ASB Bank in 2001. She then founded Club Life, an insurance company now called OnePath LIfe, which she sold to ING in 2009. In 2011, she established Partners Life, and sold this in 2022 to Japanese life insurer Dai-ichi Life for $1 billion. In 2024, she retired from Partners Life.

In the 2017 New Year Honours, Ballantyne was appointed an Officer of the New Zealand Order of Merit, for services to the insurance industry.
