= Partners Life =

New Zealand insurance company

- Type: Privately owned company
- Industry: Life Insurance
- Founded: April 2011; 15 years ago
- Headquarters: Auckland, New Zealand
- Key people: Naomi Ballantyne
- Products: Life, trauma, disability income, health insurance
- Website: partnerslife.co.nz

Partners Life is a New Zealand-based insurance company which provides life and health insurance. As of 2019 it had an annual revenue of $247.5 million NZD. On August 12, 2022, global life insurance specialist Dai-ichi Life Holdings, Inc announced its acquisition of 100% of the shares in Partners Group Holdings Limited, the parent company of Partners Life Limited, subject to regulators approval.

== History ==
Partners Life began as a small start-up in 2011. The venture was supported by reinsurer SCOR.

In 2020, the company announced the purchase of BNZ Life, the life insurance subsidiary of the Bank of New Zealand. The purchase is subject to approval by the RBNZ.

To celebrate a decade in business, Partners Life launched a rebranding in October 2021 as reported by Goodreturns.

On 3 September 2026, Partners Group Holdings, the parent company of Partners Life and a subsidiary of Daiichi Life Group, agreed to acquire Fidelity Life Assurance Company for NZ$630 million, subject to regulatory approvals and other completion requirements.

== Recognition ==
In 2012, Partners Life was awarded Best Emerging Business and Excellence in Strategy and Planning at the Westpac Auckland North Business Awards.

In 2018, the company received the Rainbow Tick certification for its LGBTI inclusive culture.

== See also ==
- Financial Markets Authority
