= 2016 New Zealand bravery awards =

Awards list for New Zealand

The 2016 New Zealand bravery awards were announced via a Special Honours List on 1 August 2016.

== New Zealand Bravery Decoration (NZBD) ==
For an act of exceptional bravery in a situation of danger:

- Christopher Mark Foot – of Dunedin.
- Senior Constable Blair John Spalding – New Zealand Police, of Hamilton.
- Constable Benjamin Patrick Turner – New Zealand Police, of Ōhaupō.
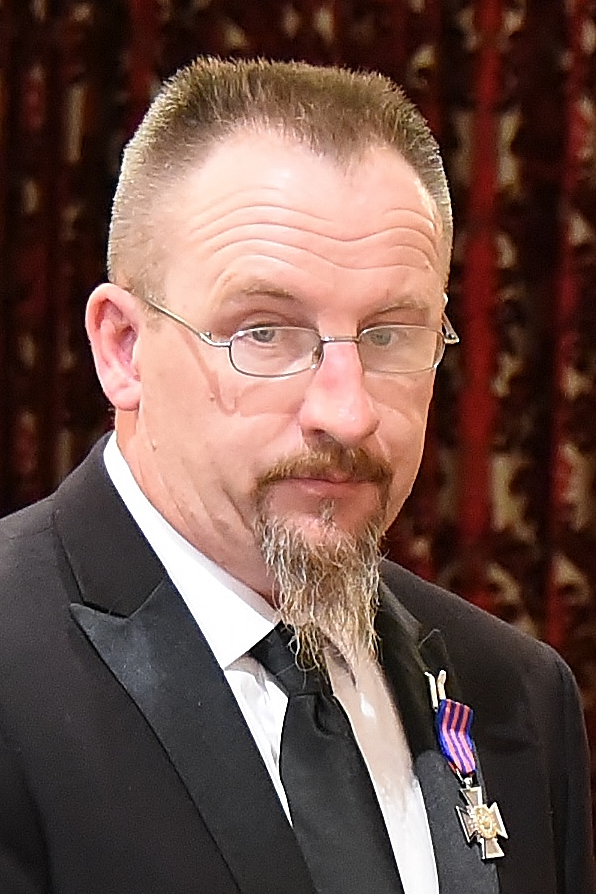
Chris Foot

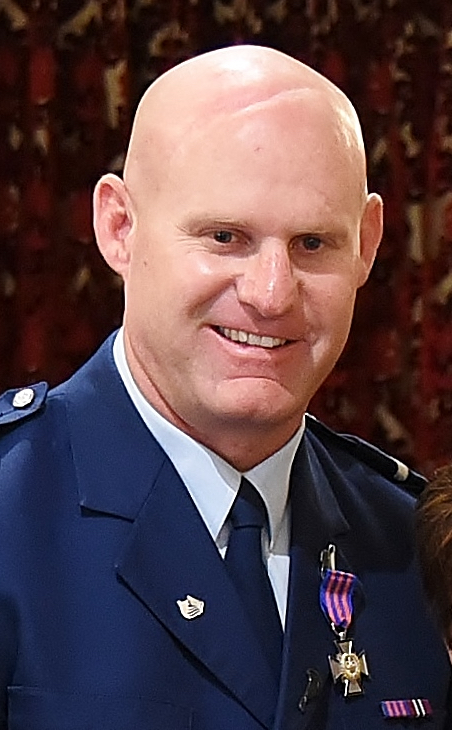
Blair Spalding

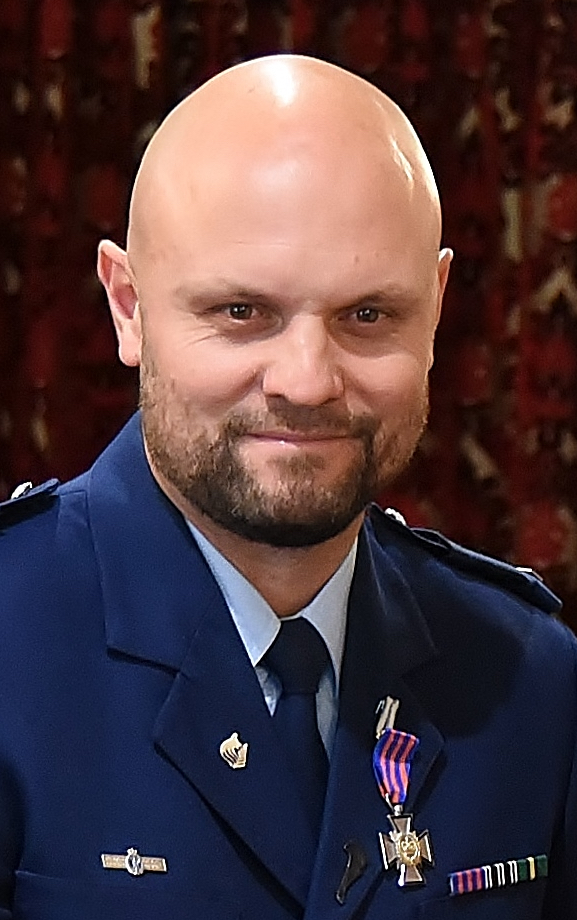
Ben Turner

== New Zealand Bravery Medal (NZBM) ==
For an act of bravery:

- Dr Christopher Michael Thomas Henry – of Kaikōura.
- Carl Jennings – of Sydney, Australia.
- Sergeant Ryan William Lilleby – New Zealand Police, of Auckland.
- Constable Christopher Steven McDowell – New Zealand Police, of Drury.
- Constable Thomas Deane O’Connor – New Zealand Police, of Papamoa.
- George Puturangi Paekau – of Hamilton.
- Dr David Gwyther Richards – of Christchurch.
- James Nicholas Watkins MStJ – of Christchurch.
