= 2006 New Zealand bravery awards =

The 2006 New Zealand bravery awards were announced via a special honours list on 14 October 2006, and recognised 15 people for acts of bravery between 2000 and 2005.

== New Zealand Bravery Decoration (NZBD) ==
- Craig David Bennett – constable, New Zealand Police.

On 7 May 2005 at about 7.15 a.m., Constable Bennett was off duty and driving past 36 Cooper Street, in Dunedin, when he noticed that the house was on fire. He was advised by local residents that two children were still in the house and was shown their bedroom window. The room was thick with smoke and he could not see inside. Constable Bennett broke the glass, reached inside and could feel a child's body. He and a neighbour then broke the glass of a larger window and Constable Bennett put his upper body through the opening and dragged a boy to the window, where he handed him to two neighbours waiting outside. He then went back into the room, using a ground sheet to cover his mouth and nose, and had to feel his way around inside, as there was no visibility. Hearing a child moan, he moved towards the noise and located a girl wedged between a bed and the wall. He wrapped the child in the ground sheet, carried her to the window and handed her to a neighbour waiting outside. He was then told that the children's mother was also still inside. He left the house and went to a rear window and looked into another room full of smoke. Upon smashing the window, moaning could be heard from inside. Constable Bennett reached in and managed to drag a woman to the edge of the room before he was overcome by smoke. Feeling sick and dizzy, and with the woman still inside the room, he returned to his vehicle where he got a mask so he could go inside to rescue her. At this point the Fire Brigade arrived, and Constable Bennett took a fireman to the window. The fireman entered, while Constable Bennett reached in from outside, and together they were able to lift the woman out through the window. By his exceptional bravery, Constable Bennett was able to effect the rescue of three people from the blazing building.

- Ngakina Jane Bertrand – sergeant, New Zealand Police.

On 17 and 18 January 2005, there were riots at Yandina in the Solomon Islands during an industrial dispute. At the time of the riots, Sergeant Bertrand was a police constable with the acting rank of Senior Sergeant. On the first day (17 January), a group of protesters attempted to storm the police boat tying up at the wharf. Constable Bertrand led a small number of Royal Solomon Islands police officers to deal with this attack. She and her small group were heavily outnumbered but, despite being assaulted by a number of protesters, she was able to stand her ground and make an arrest while waiting for back-up. After the prisoner had been moved to the police station, the crowd attempted to storm the building to release the man and a two-hour struggle ensued before the mob was forced away. During the struggle, a number of women and children were pushed to the front of the crowd to prevent the police using pepper spray or baton charges to disperse them. With the young children in the front line, some of the men at the rear began using slingshots to fire stones at the police, some of which were large and thrown with such force they travelled more than 100 metres. Constable Bertrand took the risk of placing herself at the front to protect the children and calling upon those slinging stones to cease their activities. Her positive action and the respect the local population had for her encouraged the rock throwers to stop. The police present at this incident did not have protective equipment available to them. The next day (18 January), some 50 people attacked police lines in front of a ship that had arrived to load the local copra crop. Some of the crowd retreated leaving the ground open again for rocks to be thrown by slingshot at the police. Despite being struck on the leg by a rock, and receiving a significant injury, Constable Bertrand took a team of Royal Solomon Island police officers to the rear of the crowd in an attempt to deter the stone throwers and arrest those who continued to assault the police lines. Her actions played a major part in temporarily restoring order. A little later, another group of about 50 strikers moved to the rear of the copra company's yard, destroyed the boundary fence and began stoning the workers inside. The police reserve group went to confront them and Constable Bertrand took the police vehicle from the police station and acted as a collection point for prisoners and the injured. The vehicle immediately came under attack, with the entire crowd turning against the police. Over 400 people were now attacking the police positions. Constable Bertrand retreated to the police station and despite the risk, exposed herself to a hail of rocks in order to move to safety a group of children who had been sitting nearby. She then managed to get some protective equipment and led a Royal Solomon Island police team out to disperse the attackers. After 90 minutes of sustained action, the attackers were dispersed and order was restored. In a subsequent clean-up, more than 200 rocks were removed from the back lawn of the police station. Constable Bertrand distinguished herself with a number of acts of bravery during this very dangerous period.

- Pes Sia'atoutai Fa'aui – of Glen Eden.

On the afternoon of 28 November 2005, Pes Sia'atoutai Fa'aui, an environmental officer employed by the Waitakere City Council, was on duty in Railside Avenue, Henderson. Nearby, a man with a knife had stabbed and injured a sport shop owner, who had to flee his shop after receiving stab injuries to his back, stomach, arm and hand. The offender then crossed the road and fatally stabbed a 65-year-old man who was getting into his car. A police officer arrived on the scene and the offender advanced on him with the knife. The police officer repeatedly called on the man to stop but he continued to advance even after being shot three times from five shots fired at him by the officer. Witnesses describe the man increasing the determination of his advance on the police officer, who was retreating backwards. As the police officer was turning to evade his attacker, Mr Fa'aui tackled the offender from behind, hitting him with his right shoulder into his back, while bringing his right arm around his front. In doing so, he received deep cuts to a number of his fingers, which had come into contact with the knife. The tackle succeeded in knocking the offender to the ground, after which two other police officers who had just arrived on the scene were able to subdue and handcuff him. Mr Fa'aui's action prevented any further possibility of injury or death to others in the vicinity, including the police officer who had originally confronted the offender as well as the offender himself. Mr Fa'aui's act of exceptional bravery led to the arrest of a dangerous offender and possibly saved a police officer from serious injury.

- David Templeton – sergeant, New Zealand Police.

On 21 January 2003, following a bizarre mutilation of two women in the Thames area, the offender fled to South Auckland. Once there, he shot and killed a man outside a cinema and restaurant complex, then left the scene in a motor vehicle. Sergeant Templeton, then Senior Constable, was on duty with his police dog nearby and came across the offender fleeing the scene. He reported the car and the circumstances to the Police Communications Centre, advising that he was pursuing the offender's car. When the offender realised that he was being pursued, he fired a number of shots from a semi-automatic weapon directly at Senior Constable Templeton and his vehicle, and several bullets hit the vehicle. Initially Senior Constable Templeton did not realise that he was being shot at, but once he did, he withdrew to what he considered to be a safe distance, while still reporting the offender's movements. Shortly afterwards, the offender slowed down and focused the laser telescopic sights of his firearm at Senior Constable Templeton's head and face and again fired shots at him. Fortunately none of the shots hit the officer. By this time, other police were involved in the pursuit of the offender, who then fled a short distance before breaking into a house nearby and taking two adults hostage for a number of hours before surrendering to the Armed Offenders Squad and Hostage Negotiation Team. An investigation of the incident has since determined that Senior Constable Templeton was shot at on four separate occasions and that one of the bullets had hit his vehicle on the sill below the driver's door, very close to where he had been sitting. Senior Constable Templeton has also displayed bravery on other occasions.

- George William White – sergeant, New Zealand Police.

On 17 and 18 January 2005, there was a riot at Yandina in the Solomon Islands during an industrial dispute. On 17 January, Constable Ngakina Jane Bertrand had been assaulted during an incident and Sergeant White, then an acting inspector, together with another officer went to her assistance, using pepper spray to force a number of strikers to withdraw. They were punched and kicked while doing so. An arrested person was placed in the police cells after which some 300 angry strikers attempted to storm the police station. After several hours of skirmishing with the strikers, the latter were pushed back to the market area and talked into staying there to allow the police to process the prisoner, who was bailed once calm had been restored. The following day (18 January) at about 10.30 a.m., large rocks were propelled at police lines, which were preventing access to the wharf area where copra was being loaded. Peace was restored temporarily but a riot developed at about 11.30 a.m. police lines were attacked, as was the police station. Every police officer present received injuries from rocks and one Royal Solomon Island police member received a large rock though his shield and helmet visor, which knocked him out, broke his nose and cut his forehead. Tear gas and pepper spray were both deployed at this stage, with some 500 rioters being present. By 3.30 p.m., the rioters had been pushed back from the police station and the ship had departed, however the police by now had no more tear gas and were low on pepper spray. On 19 January, a list of identifiable offenders was compiled and arrests were made, resulting in some 150 strikers coming back to confront the police station. After a long stand-off and some negotiations, a number of people gave themselves up to police and by early afternoon the number of arrests had risen to 57. These prisoners were successfully removed from Yandina, after which the police spent the rest of the day out in the community talking to people, trying to settle the situation down to ensure their own safety, the safety of the local Royal Solomon Island police members and those workers who had tried to load the ship. Throughout these incidents, Sergeant White displayed exceptional bravery and leadership in the face of an overwhelming number of rioters armed with slingshots and rocks. He co-ordinated defensive positions as well as leading repeated forays made up of untrained Royal Solomon Island police personnel against the rioters, in efforts to disperse them. His leadership, determination and resolve over the two days of rioting led to the successful quelling of the riots and the arrest of over 50 offenders. The police response was undertaken with very limited manpower and resources, without respite for rest or replenishment and in circumstances which had the potential for the loss of life.

== New Zealand Bravery Medal (NZBM) ==
- Philip Samuel Blakeman – sergeant, Royal New Zealand Air Force.

On the evening of 3 June 2004, Sergeant Blakeman was the winchperson in the crew of an Iroquois helicopter that had been tasked to assist with the evacuation of a Royal Australian Navy seaman who had suffered serious spinal injuries after falling down a ravine on the Florida Islands, part of the Solomon Islands group. The crew had been flying for over three hours, in low cloud and torrential rain, by the time they finally positioned over the rescue site in the evening to rescue the seaman. As Sergeant Blakeman was lowered on the winch wire, visibility reduced markedly when the helicopter rotors sucked down the thin layer of cloud from above, such that the winch operator in the helicopter could see neither the ground nor Sergeant Blakeman on the wire, only the treetops. The winch operation was continued with Sergeant Blakeman passing through a gap in the 65 metre high treetops, amidst broken branches, until he reached the ground some 75 metres below the helicopter. This was almost at the full extent of the winch cable. Sergeant Blakeman first supervised the winch recovery of the doctor, an activity which was made difficult by the lack of direct communication with the helicopter. Through relaying radio directions through HMAS Tarakan, which was anchored nearby, Sergeant Blakeman was able to effect the doctor’s recovery and then directed his attention to the injured seaman, who he assisted into a stokes litter. He then accompanied the injured seaman as they were winched up to the helicopter. During the ascent they were exposed to the hazards presented by darkness, bad weather, poor communications with the helicopter crew and the distance to the helicopter. The hazards were further compounded when Sergeant Blakeman and the stretcher-bound casualty began to spin rapidly for much of the ascent through the trees, until reaching the helicopter. Sergeant Blakeman was well aware of the significant risk that this rescue posed to him personally. Had the helicopter crew lost visual reference or been unable to maintain a stable hover, the winch cable might have had to be cut and he would most likely have been killed. Despite the risk, he conducted his duties calmly and professionally, and his actions were central to the safe recovery of the injured seaman.

- Kerry Charles Palmer
- Shaun Bruce Campbell
- Hugo Johannes Josephus Verhagen

On 25 September 2000, John Painting and his son Matthew were tramping in the Kaimanawa Ranges. At an altitude of almost 1,500 metres (5,000 feet), they were caught in what was later reported as a “50 year storm” with freezing temperatures, 70 knot winds and blizzard conditions. They were found by chance in a distressed condition and suffering from hypothermia by Brian Pickering, who was on the first day of a six-day journey into the Kaimanawa Forest Park. Using his skill and experience, Mr Pickering positioned the two men below the track, placed them in their sleeping bags and gave them food. He tried to wrap them with a tent to shield them from the driving wind. He then dialled 111 on his cell phone and alerted the police to the situation. A Search and Rescue Team was activated but not able to be deployed until well after dark. Access to the Kaimanawa Range begins from a road end at an altitude of 680 metres, and then climbs sharply for a distance of five kilometres to the tree line at an altitude of 1,330 metres. The “lost party” was a further 5.5 kilometres across the open tops of the range. These tops are rock and pumice with sparse tussock cover, and totally open to the elements. The first team to reach the tree line spent some time attempting to cross the open tops of the range, but soon became so physically exhausted by the extreme weather conditions, that they were forced to turn back to shelter at the tree line. A second search team, consisting of Kerry Charles Palmer, the team leader, Shaun Bruce Campbell and Hugo Johannes Josephus Verhagen were deployed some time later. After three hours walking in the dark to the tree line, they ventured onto the open tops before daylight. There they struck extreme conditions, with the wind at a right angle to the ridge and blowing at approximately 70 knots. The wind was so strong that it made breathing very difficult. There was snow underfoot except for short distances where it had been blown off exposed parts of the track. Much of the snow was knee deep and progress required “plunging” foot holes. Mr Verhagen was blown over several times and on one occasion was blown into a small crevasse and had to be assisted out by the other two members of his team. At times the group had to hold each other in a huddle to avoid being blown over. After traversing approximately three kilometres along the open tops, the trio had to reconsider their position as they had doubts as to their ability to reach the stranded trampers in the extreme conditions. They decided to continue as they knew that there was a strong possibility one or more of the “lost party” might die without further assistance. On reaching the lost trampers, they found that Mr Painting was in poor condition, although his son and Mr Pickering were in somewhat better condition. They were in a shallow hollow out of the wind, but otherwise in the open. They were wrapped in plastic sheets and sleeping bags which was the only material available. The team immediately set about erecting shelter, provided hot food and drinks and then helped Mr Painting and his son into warm clothes. Some three hours later a third search team arrived on the scene and once the group was fit to move, the campsite was moved to a more sheltered spot. By mid-afternoon, the wind lessened and the three members of the second search team were able to walk out and return to their base. Other search and rescue personnel remained with the trampers as the latter were not in a fit state to move and the weather was still too bad for a helicopter rescue that day. They also knew that there may well be only a short window in the weather in which to make the helicopter pick-up and only those personnel that could fit into one helicopter lift could safely remain at the rescue site. These personnel spent another night out and were recovered by the helicopter the following morning. Although the actions of Mr Pickering had initially saved the lives of Mr Painting and his son, it is doubtful if his efforts, without adequate equipment, would have been enough to keep Mr Painting alive for the further 22 hours before rescue occurred. The efforts of the second search and rescue team probably saved the lives of Mr Painting and his son, and Mr Pickering.

Note to citation: In January 2005, Mr Pickering was awarded the New Zealand Bravery Decoration for his part in this rescue. The three members of the first search team were each awarded the New Zealand Bravery Medal for their unsuccessful rescue attempt.

- Able Hydrographic Systems Operator Keran Mana Durrant – lately Royal New Zealand Navy.
- Able Chef Tyson Wiremu Job – Royal New Zealand Navy.

On the morning of 16 August 2004, Able Hydrographic Systems Operator (AHSO) Durrant and Able Chef Job were in a group of 22 members of the ship’s company of HMNZS Endeavour undertaking a routine lifeboat drill in Sydney Harbour. As the lifeboat was about to be lowered into the water, it suddenly released from the lifeboat launch system and plunged 10 metres into the water. On the way it struck the ship’s side, turned over and landed in the water upside down. During the course of this violent descent, AHSO Durrant suffered severe lacerations to his head and face. Able Chef Job suffered a significant impact to his chest, a laceration to his face and bruising to his left leg. Both were shaken from being tossed around in the falling craft as well as suffering from their injuries. In the face of considerable danger and confusion, however, both men coolly and deliberately remained in the upturned lifeboat, ensured that all the occupants had made their escape and no-one had been left behind. They then made their own escape by which time the exit hatch of the lifeboat had become submerged, the glass window had broken, water was pouring into the boat and there was a danger of becoming trapped inside. Nevertheless, they remained calm throughout. Once clear of the boat, they made their way to safety. Afterwards, both men elected to re-enter the water to assist with the recovery of other members of the crew. By ensuring the safety of other crew members ahead of their own, AHSO Durrant and Able Chef Job displayed considerable bravery and may possibly have saved the lives of several of their ship-mates, who could have been trapped as the lifeboat filled with water.

- Kali Peaua Fungavaka

On 22 August 2005 sometime after 1.00 p.m., a young woman was working alone at the Shell Service Station in Atkinson Avenue, Otahuhu. A man who had recently formed a relationship with her arrived at the station and placed an LPG cylinder outside the front door. He then bought petrol for another person who had taken him to the service station. He walked away from the shop, returning shortly afterwards, collected the gas cylinder and walked inside. He placed the cylinder on the floor at the end of the counter where the woman was working and an argument then ensued between them, which developed into a struggle. The woman tried to run outside but the man, while holding a packet of matches in his hand, blocked her path. He then closed the front doors. A member of the public arrived and saw the doors closed, and witnessed the young woman screaming as she struggled with the offender. She was dragged to the location of the LPG cylinder and, after trying to get away several times, was finally overpowered and pulled back by the hair, at which time she fell backwards into the ice cream refrigerator. She was then forced back to the place where the LPG cylinder was located. At that point, she was engulfed in a ball of flame to the top half of her body, head and face, while the offender received some burns to his face and left hand, before he leapt over the counter to make his escape. The young woman then crawled out of the shop and collapsed on the forecourt outside, with the flames still burning fiercely. Some passers-by, including Kali Peaua Fungavaka, saw what had occurred. Mr Fungavaka wet his jumper under a tap and tried to extinguish the flames that were burning the young woman. When this was unsuccessful, he entered the shop and got a fire extinguisher, which was beside the gas cylinder. This was burning and flames were coming from its nozzle. Using the extinguisher, he was able to extinguish the flames burning the young woman after which he re-entered the shop and extinguished the fire inside, despite the fact that the shop was filling with smoke. The young women subsequently died of multiple burns. Mr Fungavaka displayed bravery in retrieving the fire extinguisher from the shop in order to attempt to save the life of the young woman. He also extinguished a fire which posed a danger to himself and to five other members of the public who were present by that time.

- Staff Sergeant Dion Wayne Palmer – Royal New Zealand Army Education Corps.

On the afternoon of 17 January 2004, Staff Sergeant Palmer and his family were visiting Himatangi Beach. At about 2.30 p.m., he heard calls for help and saw a young boy and an adult male in difficulties about 50 metres off-shore and about one kilometre south of the flagged area of the beach. Despite a strong undertow, and at considerable risk to himself, he swam about 150 metres before reaching the pair. As both the man and the boy, who was 7 years old, appeared calm, Staff Sergeant Palmer took hold of the boy and began swimming with him back to shore, assuming that the man would follow. Having safely reached the beach with the boy, he discovered that the man had disappeared among the large waves. At this stage, local lifeguards appeared on the scene. Although he was exhausted by his earlier swim in very difficult conditions, he assisted the lifeguards on their safety boat in an unsuccessful attempt to find the man. A police investigation into the tragedy states that, had it not been for Staff Sergeant Palmer’s prompt action and in putting his own life at risk, two people would have lost their lives.

- Squadron Leader Shaun Paul Sexton – Royal New Zealand Air Force.

On the evening of 3 June 2004, Squadron Leader Sexton was captain of an Iroquois helicopter tasked to assist with the rescue of a Royal Australian Navy seaman, who had suffered serious spinal injuries after falling down a ravine on the Florida Islands, part of the Solomon Islands group. Attempts by others to complete a rescue in daylight had been unsuccessful, but because of the critical nature of the seaman’s injuries and the inability to rescue him by land, Squadron Leader Sexton decided to make a further rescue attempt at night. Despite having to negotiate darkness, low cloud and torrential rain, which forced him to turn back a number of times, he managed to reach the rescue party on the ground at a site beneath 65 metre trees on a plateau 200 metres above the coast. After the crew had commenced winching a crewman down through a small clearing in the forest canopy, visibility reduced markedly when the aircraft rotors sucked down the thin layer of cloud from above. This meant that the crew could see neither the ground, nor the crewman on the wire; only the treetops. Despite only being able to determine the situation on the ground through radio transmissions, which were relayed by the co-pilot through HMAS Tarakan anchored nearby, Squadron Leader Sexton calmly directed the crew during the recovery. While undertaking the recovery, he maintained the helicopter in a steady hover 75 metres above the rescue site, despite having very poor visual references, low cloud and rain, and while using night vision equipment. During the course of this hazardous rescue, Squadron Leader Sexton also capably handled the loss of communications with the winch operator on two occasions. In the face of the most trying conditions, and having acknowledged the risk that was required to effect the rescue, Squadron Leader Sexton then managed that risk most professionally. His cool demeanour throughout the operation, despite the risk to himself and his crew, was pivotal to the success of his crew in recovering the injured seaman to the aircraft and subsequently to a medical facility. Throughout this rescue mission, Squadron Leader Sexton demonstrated bravery as well as flying skills and leadership of the highest order.

- Joan Diane Taylor – of Nelson.

On Saturday 12 November 2005 at 9.40 p.m., an 18-year-old woman was walking along a Nelson street when she was dragged into a nearby vehicle by an offender. Her screams alerted Joan Diane Taylor, aged 62, and her husband, who were inside their house nearby. Mrs Taylor approached the car and demanded that the offender let the women go. She was not put off by an explanation that the woman was injured and told the offender that the police and ambulance had been called. She then repeated her demand that the offender let the woman go. This distracted the offender and his victim was able to run from the car into the Taylor’s house, followed by Mr Taylor. As Mrs Taylor turned to follow them she was attacked by the offender, who heard her telling her husband the licence plate number of his car, so as to pass it on to the police. Mrs Taylor was struck on the back of the head, the blow causing her to collapse onto her driveway. As she did so, she hit her head against the ground, splitting her head open. The offender left the area on foot but was later apprehended when he returned to collect his car. He has since been sentenced to four years and five months’ imprisonment for abduction, assault with intent to commit sexual violation and injuring with intent. Found in his car at the time of the incident were a pair of handcuffs, a balaclava and a length of rope. Mrs Taylor’s bravery and persistence probably saved the young woman from serious injury and possibly death at the hands of her attacker.
