= New Zealand Bravery Decoration =

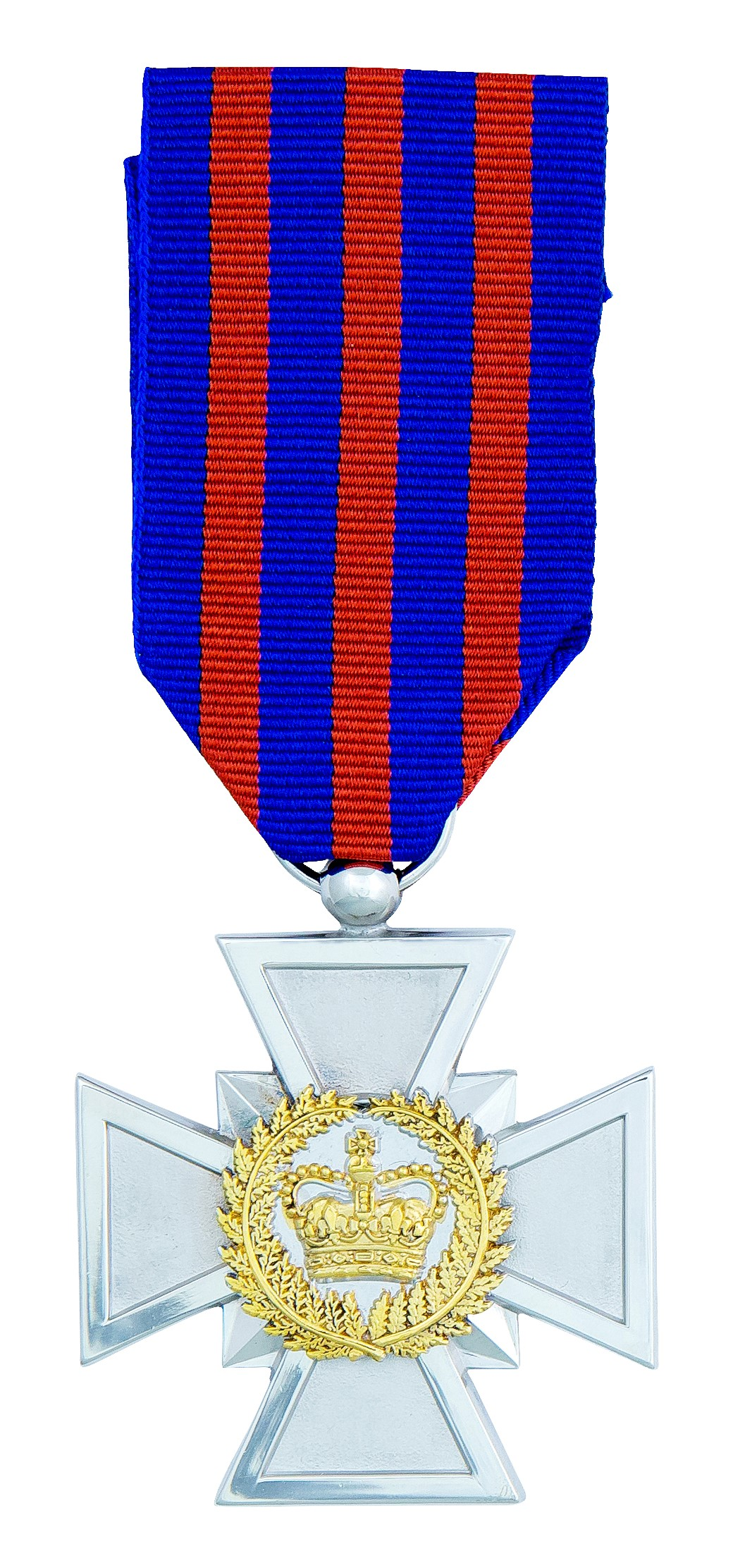
- Obverse of the medal
- Type: Civil decoration
- Awarded for: "acts of exceptional bravery in situations of danger"
- Description: 45 mm, (obverse) cross pattée surmounted by a small faceted four-pointed star with the Royal Crown and fern frond wreath emblem; (reverse) inscribed "FOR BRAVERY - MO TE MAIA". With ring suspension.
- Presented by: New Zealand
- Eligibility: Those performing acts of bravery in, or meriting recognition by, New Zealand
- Status: Currently awarded
- Established: 20 September 1999
- First award: 23 October 1999
- Latest award: 13 December 2025

Highlights
- Total recipients: 52
- Ribbon: 32 mm, seven equal and alternating stripes of bright blue and crimson

Precedence
- Next (higher): New Zealand Gallantry Decoration
- Next (lower): Order of St John

The New Zealand Bravery Decoration (NZBD) is the third-level civil decoration of New Zealand.

It was instituted by royal warrant on 20 September 1999 as part of the move to replace British bravery awards with an indigenous New Zealand Bravery system. The medal, which may be awarded posthumously, is granted in recognition of "acts of exceptional bravery in situations of danger". The medal is primarily a civilian award, but it is also awarded to members of the armed forces who perform acts of bravery in non-operational circumstances (given that the New Zealand gallantry awards may only be awarded "while involved in war and warlike operational service (including peacekeeping)".

Bars are awarded to the NZBD in recognition of the performance of further acts of bravery meriting the award. Recipients are entitled to the postnominal letters NZBD.

The medal replaced the award of the Queen's Gallantry Medal, Air Force Cross, and Air Force Medal in respect of acts of bravery in, or meriting recognition by, New Zealand.

== Recipients ==
- This along with a * indicates that the New Zealand Bravery Decoration was awarded posthumously.

Name	Date of action	Location of action	Honours list
Terence Albert Hood	4 July 1989	Wellington	Special Honours List - 1999 (Bravery Awards)
Sergeant Allan Donald Cantley	29 July 1993	Morrinsville	Special Honours List - 1999 (Bravery Awards)
Christopher Michael Crean	13 March 1996*	New Plymouth	Special Honours List - 1999 (Bravery Awards)
Graeme James Hunt	21 April 1996	Flaxmere	Special Honours List - 1999 (Bravery Awards)
Constable Warren Gilbert Sloss	12 October 1996	Whanganui	Special Honours List - 1999 (Bravery Awards)
Hakihana Jackson Pomare	21 June 1997*	Matauri Bay	Special Honours List - 1999 (Bravery Awards)
Brian John Pickering	25 September 2000	Kaimanawa Range	Special Honours List - 29 January 2005 (Bravery Awards)
Constable Geoffrey Frank Knight	4 June 2001	Tapanui	Special Honours List - 29 January 2005 (Bravery Awards)
Sergeant David Templeton	21 January 2003	South Auckland	Special Honours List - 14 October 2006 (Bravery Awards)
Sergeant Ngakina Jane Bertrand	17–18 January 2005	Yandina, Solomon Islands	Special Honours List - 14 October 2006 (Bravery Awards)
Sergeant George William White	17–18 January 2005	Yandina, Solomon Islands	Special Honours List - 14 October 2006 (Bravery Awards)
Constable Craig David Bennett	7 May 2005	Dunedin	Special Honours List - 14 October 2006 (Bravery Awards)
Pes Sia’atoutai Fa'aui	28 November 2005	Henderson	Special Honours List - 14 October 2006 (Bravery Awards)
Constable Robert Bruce Gibson	5 June 2005	Mount Albert	Special Honours List - 3 May 2008 (Bravery Awards)
Constable Karl Hugh Pennington	5 June 2005	Mount Albert	Special Honours List - 3 May 2008 (Bravery Awards)
Constable James Alexander Muir	23 June 2007	Whakatāne	Special Honours List - 2 April 2011 (Bravery Awards)
Senior Firefighter Mervyn Raymond Neil	5 April 2008	Tamahere	Special Honours List - 2 April 2011 (Bravery Awards)
Wing Commander Anthony Frederick Ronald Millsom	26 April 2008	RNZAF Base Auckland	Special Honours List - 2 April 2011 (Bravery Awards)
Inspector Michael Ross O'Leary	24 April 2009	near Taupō	Special Honours List - 2 April 2011 (Bravery Awards)
Sergeant Heath Courtenay Jones	7 May 2009	Napier	Special Honours List - 2 April 2011 (Bravery Awards)
Senior Sergeant Anthony James Miller	7 May 2009	Napier	Special Honours List - 2 April 2011 (Bravery Awards)
Constable Kevin Lawrence Rooney	7 May 2009	Napier	Special Honours List - 2 April 2011 (Bravery Awards)
Constable Michael Thomas Wardle	13 July 2010	Christchurch	Special Honours List - 2 December 2013 (Bravery Awards)
Georgina Rose Langford	21 April 2011	near Nelson	Special Honours List - 2 December 2013 (Bravery Awards)
Dr Bryce Curran	22 February 2011	Christchurch	Special Honours List - 23 June 2014 (Bravery Awards)
Dr Lydia Grace Johns-Putra	22 February 2011	Christchurch	Special Honours List - 23 June 2014 (Bravery Awards)
Christopher Mark Foot	15 January 2014	Dunedin	Special Honours List - 1 August 2016 (Bravery Awards)
Senior Constable Blair John Spalding	25 August 2014	Hamilton	Special Honours List - 1 August 2016 (Bravery Awards)
Constable Benjamin Patrick Turner	25 August 2014	Hamilton	Special Honours List - 1 August 2016 (Bravery Awards)
Liam Christiaan Armand Beale	15 March 2019	Christchurch	Special Honours List - 16 December 2021 (Bravery Awards)
Senior Constable Scott Eric Carmody	15 March 2019	Christchurch	Special Honours List - 16 December 2021 (Bravery Awards)
Senior Constable James Andrew (Jim) Manning	15 March 2019	Christchurch	Special Honours List - 16 December 2021 (Bravery Awards)
Ziyaad Shah	15 March 2019	Christchurch	Special Honours List - 16 December 2021 (Bravery Awards)
Timothy Robin (Tim) Barrow	9 December 2019	Whakaari / White Island	Special Honours List - 26 October 2022 - (Bravery Awards)
Jason William Hill	9 December 2019	Whakaari / White Island	Special Honours List - 26 October 2022 - (Bravery Awards)
Graeme Hopcroft	9 December 2019	Whakaari / White Island	Special Honours List - 26 October 2022 - (Bravery Awards)
Sam Peter Jones	9 December 2019	Whakaari / White Island	Special Honours List - 26 October 2022 - (Bravery Awards)
Callum Mill	9 December 2019	Whakaari / White Island	Special Honours List - 26 October 2022 - (Bravery Awards)
Thomas Sandford (Tom) Storey	9 December 2019	Whakaari / White Island	Special Honours List - 26 October 2022 - (Bravery Awards)
Constable Matthew Dennis Hunt	19 June 2020*	Auckland	Special Honours List - 6 December 2024 - (Bravery Awards)
Bodey Thomas Foley	11 April 2020	Lower Hutt	Special Honours List - 6 December 2024 - (Bravery Awards)
Noel George Jones	1 May 2020	Auckland	Special Honours List - 6 December 2024 - (Bravery Awards)
Vanessa Miller-Andrews	10 May 2021	Dunedin	Special Honours List - 6 December 2024 - (Bravery Awards)
Stephen Robert Brodie	3 September 2021	Auckland	Special Honours List - 6 December 2024 - (Bravery Awards)
Johnathan Aaron Curreen	3 September 2021	Auckland	Special Honours List - 6 December 2024 - (Bravery Awards)
Ross Elliott Tomlinson	3 September 2021	Auckland	Special Honours List - 6 December 2024 - (Bravery Awards)
Ian Stewart Anderson	24 October 2022	Kekerengu	Special Honours List - 6 December 2024 - (Bravery Awards)
Roland Ipenburg	24 October 2022	Kekerengu	Special Honours List - 6 December 2024 - (Bravery Awards)
Senior Constable Andrew Ian Watson	24 October 2022	Kekerengu	Special Honours List - 6 December 2024 - (Bravery Awards)
Young Person N (Note: Name withheld for privacy reasons)	17 September 2024	Auckland	Special Honours List - 13 December 2025 - (Bravery Awards)
Junior (Losi) Faamalosi Isaako	20 June 2025	Flaxmere	Special Honours List - 13 December 2025 - (Bravery Awards)

== See also ==
- Orders, decorations, and medals of New Zealand
- New Zealand gallantry awards
- New Zealand bravery awards
- New Zealand campaign medals
