= Murder of Matthew Hunt =

2020 shooting of New Zealand police officer

Coordinates: 36°50′34″S 174°36′37″E

- Location: Massey, New Zealand
- Date: 19 June 2020; 6 years ago 10:37 am (NZST)
- Attack type: Shooting, murder, homicide
- Weapon: Norinco NHM 90
- Deaths: 1 (Matthew Hunt)
- Injuries: 2
- Perpetrator: Eli Epiha

Constable Matthew Dennis Hunt (30 July 1991 – 19 June 2020) was a New Zealand Police officer who was shot and killed during a traffic stop in Massey, West Auckland, on 19 June 2020. Hunt and fellow Constable David Goldfinch had intercepted a vehicle whose registered owner was subject to several police alerts when the driver, Eli Epiha, fled at speed before crashing into a parked vehicle on Reynella Drive. Epiha then emerged from the wreckage armed with a Norinco NHM 90 semi-automatic firearm and opened fire on both officers. Goldfinch was struck by four shots but survived. Hunt, having lost radio contact with Goldfinch, left the patrol vehicle to locate him and was shot multiple times by Epiha, making a final radio transmission before losing consciousness. He was pronounced dead at the scene. Hunt's death was the first fatality of a New Zealand Police officer in the line of duty since the Napier shootings of 2009.

Epiha, a 24-year-old man, was arrested at the scene following a manhunt involving the Armed Offenders Squad and police helicopters. He pleaded guilty to Hunt's murder in July 2021 and was subsequently found guilty by a jury of the attempted murder of Goldfinch. On 10 December 2021, Epiha was sentenced to life imprisonment with a minimum non-parole period of 27 years at the High Court in Auckland. His appeal against the sentence was dismissed by the Court of Appeal in November 2022. A 30-year-old woman, Natalie Bracken, who drove Epiha from the scene, was convicted of being an accessory after the fact and sentenced to 12 months' imprisonment in October 2021.

Hunt's death prompted widespread public mourning across New Zealand, with the Auckland Sky Tower illuminated in police blue in his honour and officers across the country observing a minute of silence on 26 June 2020. His funeral was held on 9 July 2020. Politicians from across the parliamentary spectrum paid tribute in the House of Representatives, with Prime Minister Jacinda Ardern, Deputy Prime Minister Winston Peters, and senior members of the National Party and Green Party all speaking in his memory. Hunt was posthumously awarded the New Zealand Bravery Decoration on 6 December 2024, with his mother Diane receiving the insignia at a ceremony at Government House, Auckland on 20 May 2025.

== Matthew Dennis Hunt ==
Matthew Hunt was a 28-year-old constable born on 30 July 1991 who had served in the New Zealand Police for two and a half years. He spent the majority of his time as a frontline officer in his hometown, Orewa, before being transferred for a temporary rotation to the Impairment Prevention Team based at the Auckland Harbour Bridge Police Station. When Hunt joined in October 2017, he joined as part of Wing 312 trained at the Royal New Zealand Police College at Papakōwhai. He was raised by his mother alongside his sister in the Hibiscus Coast and attended Orewa College. According to his family, Hunt's "life-long dream" was to be a police officer after studying criminology and working in prisons.

== The incident ==
At approximately 10:37 a.m. on 19 June 2020, Constables Matthew Hunt and David Goldfinch were conducting routine traffic duties in Massey, Auckland. Checking an approaching vehicle against the police database, they found the registered owner was subject to several alerts and moved to intercept the car.

The driver, later identified as Eli Epiha, fled at speed before losing control and colliding with a parked vehicle on Reynella Drive, injuring a bystander. Goldfinch approached to render first aid, but Epiha emerged from the crashed vehicle armed with a Norinco military-style semi-automatic firearm. Goldfinch, who was unarmed, attempted to negotiate with Epiha, who opened fire. Hunt radioed the Police Emergency Communications Centre as the first shots were fired and called for backup.

Goldfinch took cover behind parked vehicles before moving further along the road. He was struck by four of nine shots fired before reaching a nearby property, from which he radioed his location and a description of the offender. Hunt, having lost radio contact with Goldfinch, left the patrol vehicle to locate him. Epiha returned and shot Hunt multiple times. Hunt made a final radio transmission before losing consciousness and died at the scene.

Epiha retrieved a second firearm from the crashed vehicle and forced a nearby resident to drive him from the scene. Goldfinch, unaware that Hunt had been shot, was assisted by passing members of the public and transported for medical treatment. He survived his injuries. According to police, the suspect fled into a silver Mazda Demio following the shooting and later abandoned the vehicle.

== Manhunt and investigation ==
In response, the police including members of the Armed Offenders Squad and Eagle helicopters launched a manhunt for the perpetrators and searched vehicles. Eight schools in Massey were also placed in lockdown including Massey High School and Don Buck Primary School. Armed police officers also guarded police stations.

Several hours after the shooting, the police stormed a home in Rena Place in Auckland's West Harbour. In addition, police also arrested a fleeing driver on the Lincoln Road overbridge over the Northwestern Motorway after using road spikes to stop his car. Police also spoke to two persons of interest. Later that night, a 24-year-old man was charged with murder, attempted murder and dangerous driving causing injury. The man briefly appeared in the Waitakere District Court on 20 June where he was formally arraigned and remanded into custody until his next court appearance on 8 July.

On 20 June, the police announced that they were looking for a 30-year-old woman named Natalie Bracken in relation to the shooting. She was charged with driving offences and as an accessory to the murder. Later that day, the police took Bracken into custody in West Auckland and confirmed that she was assisting with police inquiries.

== Legal proceedings ==
=== Eli Epiha ===
In early July 2020, Eli Epiha appeared in the Auckland High Court where he pleaded not guilty to murdering Hunt and the attempted murder of the second police officer (the then yet unnamed Constable David Goldfinch). He also pleaded not guilty to dangerous driving, causing injury to a member of the public. On 14 August, Epiha's name suppression lapsed after he abandoned his appeal for name suppression.

In early July 2021, Epiha pleaded guilty to Hunt's murder and dangerous driving causing injury after fleeing police. However, Epiha pleaded not guilty to the alleged attempted murder of the second police officer, who was identified as Goldfinch. On 12 July, Judge Geoffrey Venning convened a jury for Epiha's trial for the attempted murder of Goldfinch. In addition, suppression of Epiha's earlier guilty pleas and a non-publication order of images of the defendant was also lifted.

On 27 July 2021, Epiha was found guilty of the attempted murder of Goldfinch. During the trial, the defendant had maintained that he did not intend to kill Goldfinch. The jury took 11 1/2 hours of deliberation, eventually requiring Justice Venning to allow a majority (11-to-1) verdict and give a Papadopoulos direction to break the deadlock.

On 10 December 2021, Epiha was sentenced to life imprisonment with a minimum non-parole period of 27 years. During the sentencing, Justice Venning rejected the defendant's claim that he had acted recklessly without intention. He also declined the Crown prosecutor's recommendation that Epiha be sentenced to life imprisonment without parole, taking into account the defendant's age, history of violence and lack of remorse. The victim's mother Diane also described Epiha's apology as "vacuous" and described the devastating impact of Hunt's death on her life in her victim impact statement.

On 7 October 2022, Epiha and his lawyer Mark Edgar appealed against his sentence to the Court of Appeal, arguing that life imprisonment was unjustifiably harsh and prevented rehabilitation. Edgar claimed that Epiha had been treated harshly in comparison to other convicted murderers including Daniel Luff and Russell John Tully. Edgar also argued that Justice Venning had elevated the victims because they were police. In response, Crown lawyer Brian Dickey defended Epiha's sentence of life imprisonment, arguing that the defendant had made a determined effort to kill the police officers despite lacking premeditation. Dickey argued that Epiha posed a serious risk to public safety if released and emphasised that the defendant had delayed pleading guilty to Hunt's murder.

On 27 November 2022, the Court of Appeal rejected Epiha's appeal against his 27-year prison sentence, arguing that the sentence was not "manifestly excessive" and that the community needed protection from a violent man.

=== Natalie Bracken ===
In July 2021, Epiha's accomplice Natalie Bracken faced trial for being an accessory after the fact of murder. Following her arrest, Bracken had claimed that Epiha had threatened her at gunpoint into driving him away following the shooting of the police officers. During the trial, a cellphone video by a member of the public was played showing Bracken obtaining the keys to a car that was parked on Massey's Reynella Drive and departing with Epiha in the passenger seat. Bracken's defence lawyer Adam Couchman claimed that she had driven Epiha from the scene with the aim of protecting people and preventing further bloodshed. Prosecutor Brian Dickey disputed Bracken's claim, pointing out that Bracken had not disarmed Epiha and facilitated his escape.

On 27 July 2021, Bracken was convicted of being an accessory after the fact of wounding with intent to cause grievous bodily harm. On 1 October 2021, Bracken was sentenced to twelve months imprisonment for her role as an accessory to causing grievous bodily harm. Justice Venning rejected the defendant's claim that she had acted under compulsion to protect others, stating that she had the opportunity to run away or to hide in her house instead of returning to her house to obtain her car keys. Hunt's mother Diane Hunt also criticised the defendant for helping the killer escape and her perceived selfishness during the trial.

In February 2022, Bracken was required to appear in court in Kaitaia for breaching her bail conditions, but she failed to appear and an arrest warrant was issued. In December 2022, Bracken attempted to hide nearly a kilogram of methamphetamine during a police raid on her Auckland home. She and her partner Zion Hamuera Holtz subsequently pleaded guilty in mid-September 2023 to joint charges of possessing methamphetamine for supply, and offering to supply a Class A drug. In February 2024, Bracken was jailed for five years and nine months after being convicted of assisting another man with a commercial-scale methamphetamine enterprise.

== Aftermath ==
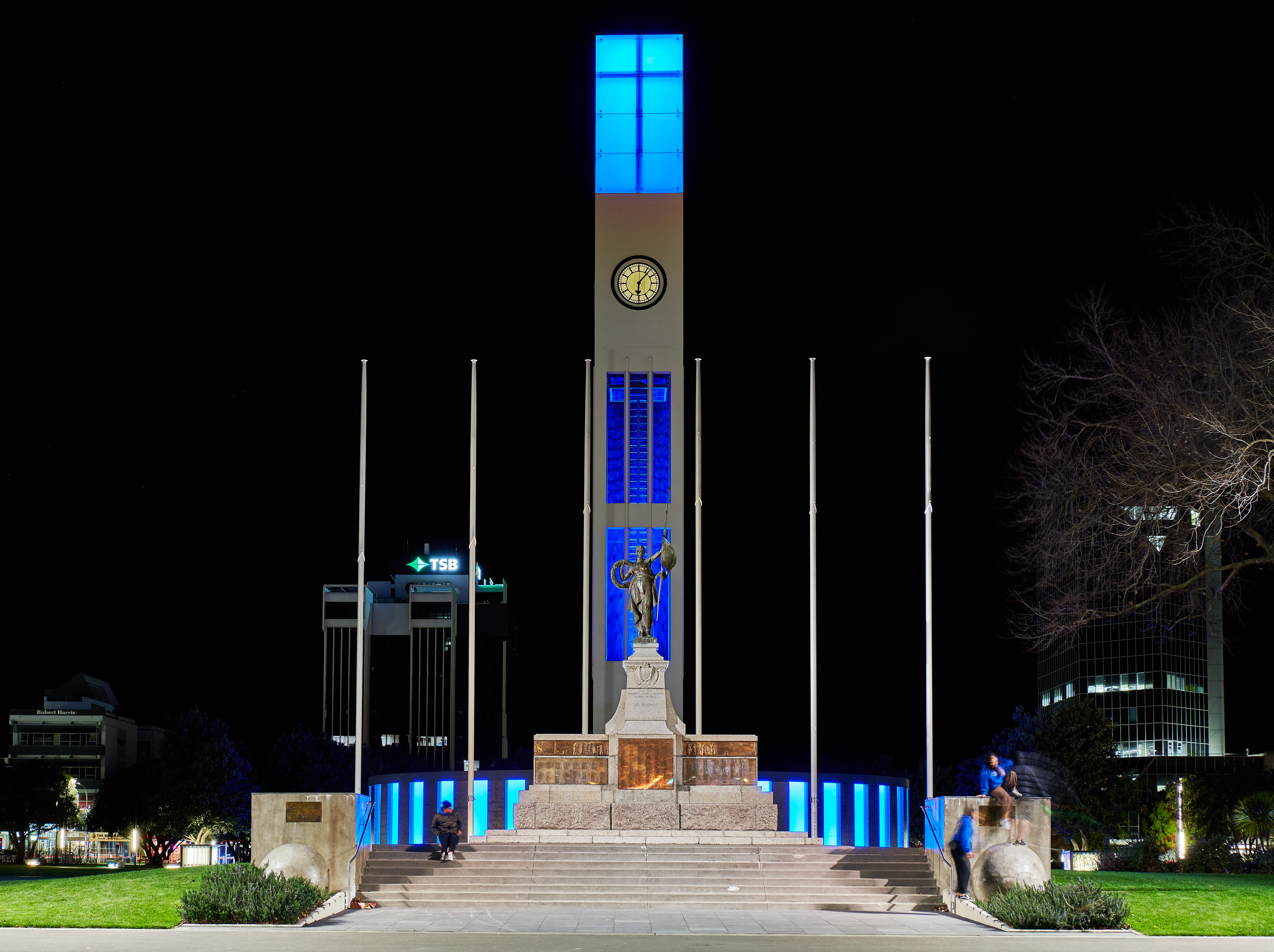
Palmerston North Clock Tower lit up blue in tribute, 21 June 2020

In response to the shooting, Police Commissioner Andrew Coster stated that "the incident points to the real risk that our officers face as they go about their jobs every day." He confirmed that police officers were not armed at the time and reiterated his commitment to an unarmed police service.

New Zealand Prime Minister Jacinda Ardern offered her condolences in Parliament, stating that "our police officers work hard every day to keep us and our communities safe." Deputy Prime Minister Winston Peters stated that "police lives matter" during his tribute to Hunt. National Member of Parliament Mark Mitchell, who was a former police officer, read a tribute from Hunt's mother and recounted an incident in which Hunt convinced a knife-wielding offender to lower his weapon. Greens co-leader James Shaw also paid tribute to Hunt, stating that it was a "heartbreaking reminder" that a police officer's life could be taken at any moment.

On 20 June 2020, the Sky Tower in Auckland lit up in police blue colours in honour of the death of Hunt.

On 22 June 2020, it was reported that two relatives of Hunt, who had travelled from Australia to attend his funeral, had expressed frustration that they had to undergo quarantine in Rotorua as they wanted all relatives that had travelled from overseas to quarantine together for two weeks as a result of the COVID-19 pandemic in New Zealand. On the same day, the Government granted permission for family members of Hunt, traveling from overseas, to quarantine together in Auckland.

On 26 June 2020, police officers across the country held a minute of silence in honour of Hunt. 100 police officers gathered in Auckland's Aotea Square to pay tribute to their comrade. Hunt's sister, father, uncle and aunt watched from their hotel rooms above, whilst in quarantine.

On 9 July 2020, Hunt's funeral was held, and on that night, the Auckland Sky Tower lit up in varying shades of blue to mark his funeral.

On 19 December 2023, it was announced an inquiry into Hunt's death would not happen due to recommendations being already addressed by police.

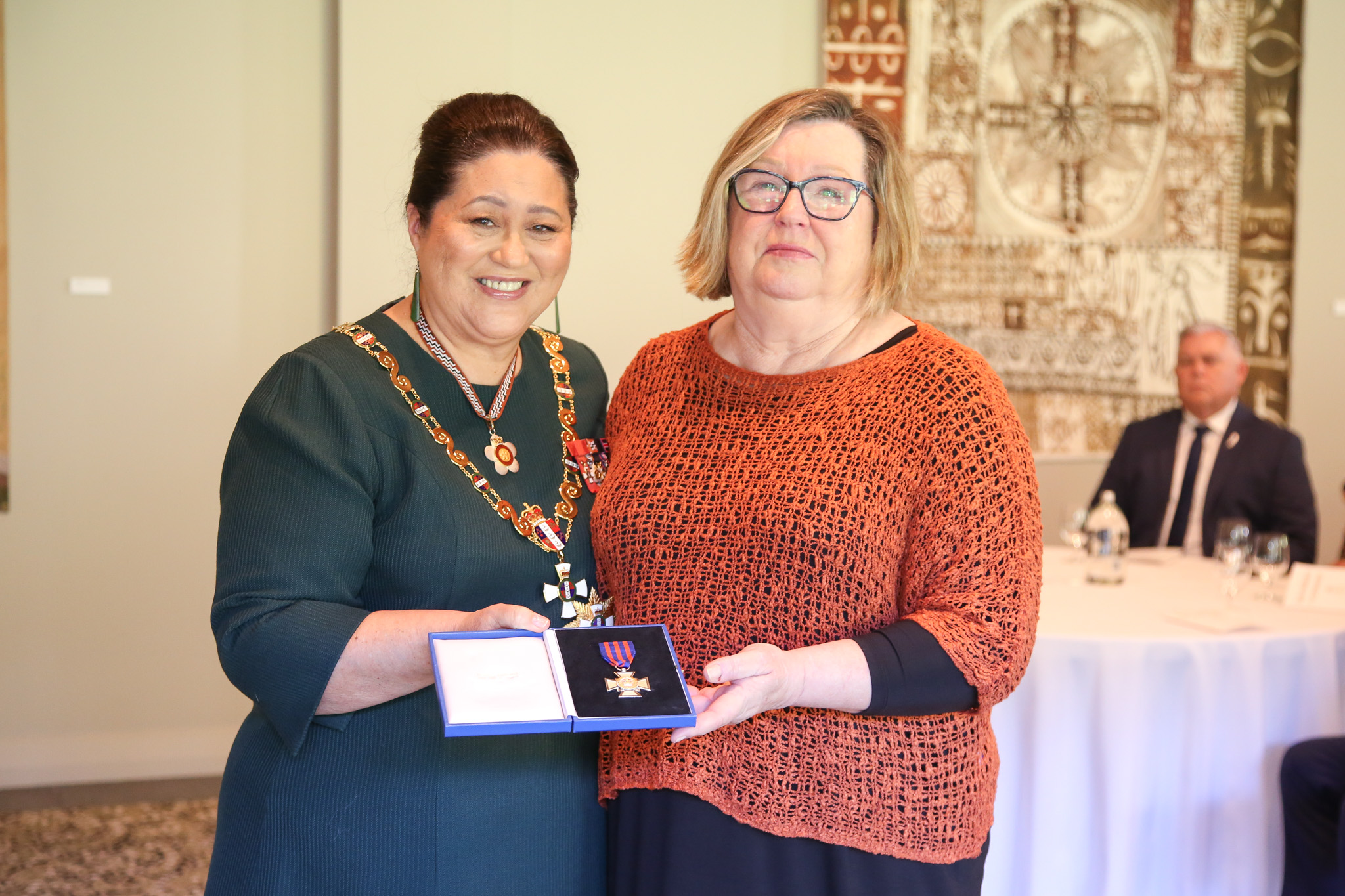
Hunt's mother, Diane Hunt (right), receiving the insignia of the New Zealand Bravery Decoration from the governor-general, Dame Cindy Kiro, at Government House, Auckland, on 20 May 2025

On 6 December 2024, Hunt was posthumously awarded the New Zealand Bravery Decoration. Hunt's mother, Diane Hunt, received the insignia of the award at a ceremony at Government House, Auckland, on 20 May 2025.
