= 2025 New Zealand bravery awards =

2025 bravery awards
- Previous: 2025 King's Birthday Honours; Next: 2026 New Year Honours
- Type: New Zealand royal honours: New Zealand Bravery Decoration; New Zealand Bravery Medal
- Date: 13 December 2025
- Country: New Zealand

Highlights
- Total recipients: 10

The 2025 New Zealand bravery awards were announced via a Special Honours List on 13 December 2025. The awards recognised the bravery of various individuals during several events between 2023 and 2025.

== New Zealand Bravery Decoration (NZBD) ==
The New Zealand Bravery Decoration was awarded for an act of exceptional bravery in a situation of danger:

- Junior (Losi) Faamalosi Isaako – of Hastings.
- Young Person N – of Auckland.

== New Zealand Bravery Medal (NZBM) ==
The New Zealand Bravery Medal was awarded for an act of bravery:

- Sergeant Richard Mervyn Bracey – of Auckland.
- Susan Rebecca Burke – of Queensland, Australia.
- Hayden Paul Cornwell – of Hamilton.
- Constable Friederike (Fritzi) Faber – of Auckland.
- Sergeant Harshad (Harry) Ashok Ghodke – of Hastings.
- Detective Sergeant Heath Courtenay Jones NZBD – of Havelock North.
- Constable Alexander James Christian Henry Kerr – of Hamilton.
- Jonathan Jordan Young – of New South Wales, Australia. (Note: Posthumous award. Deceased 19 January 2023 at Glenorchy)
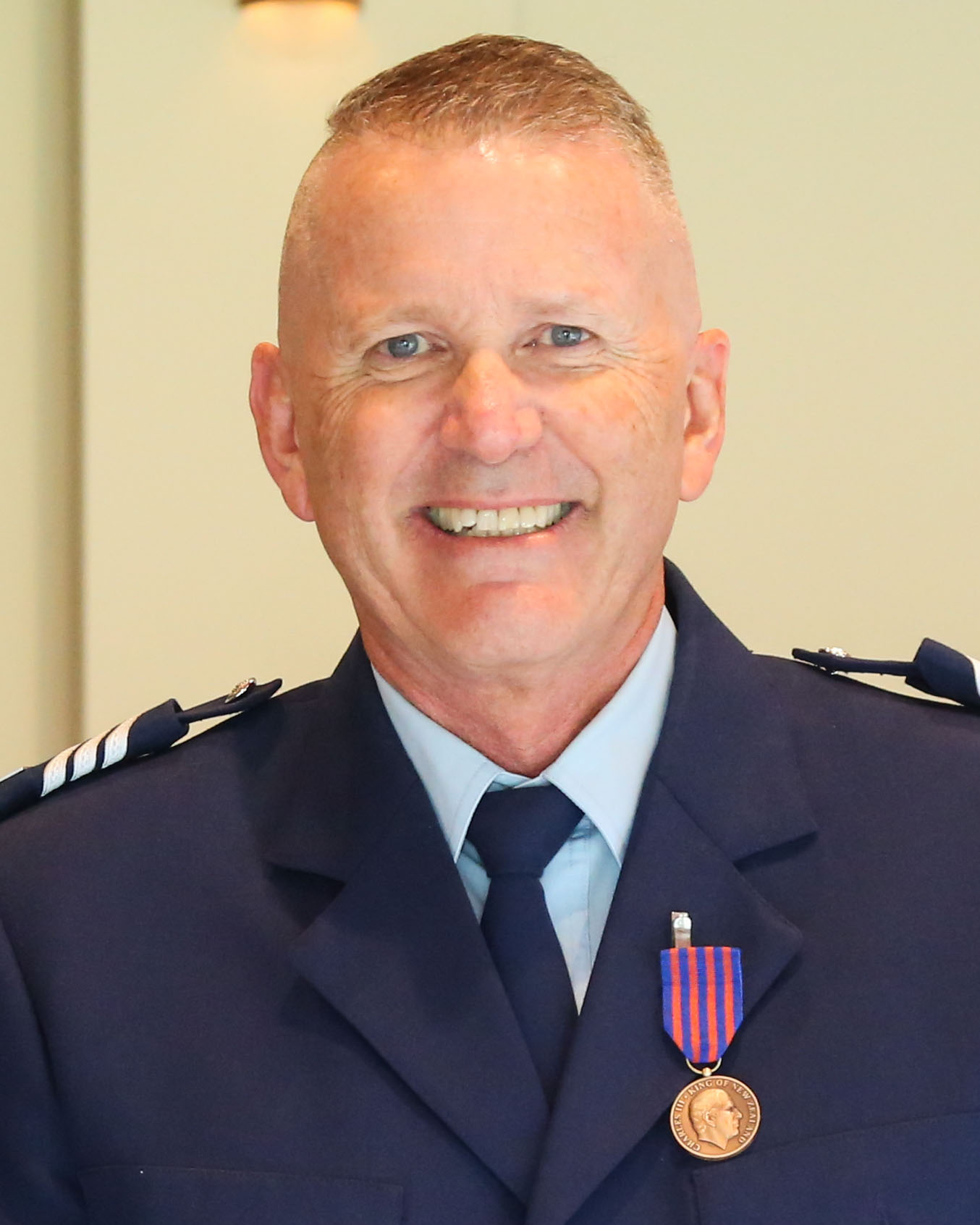
Richard Bracey

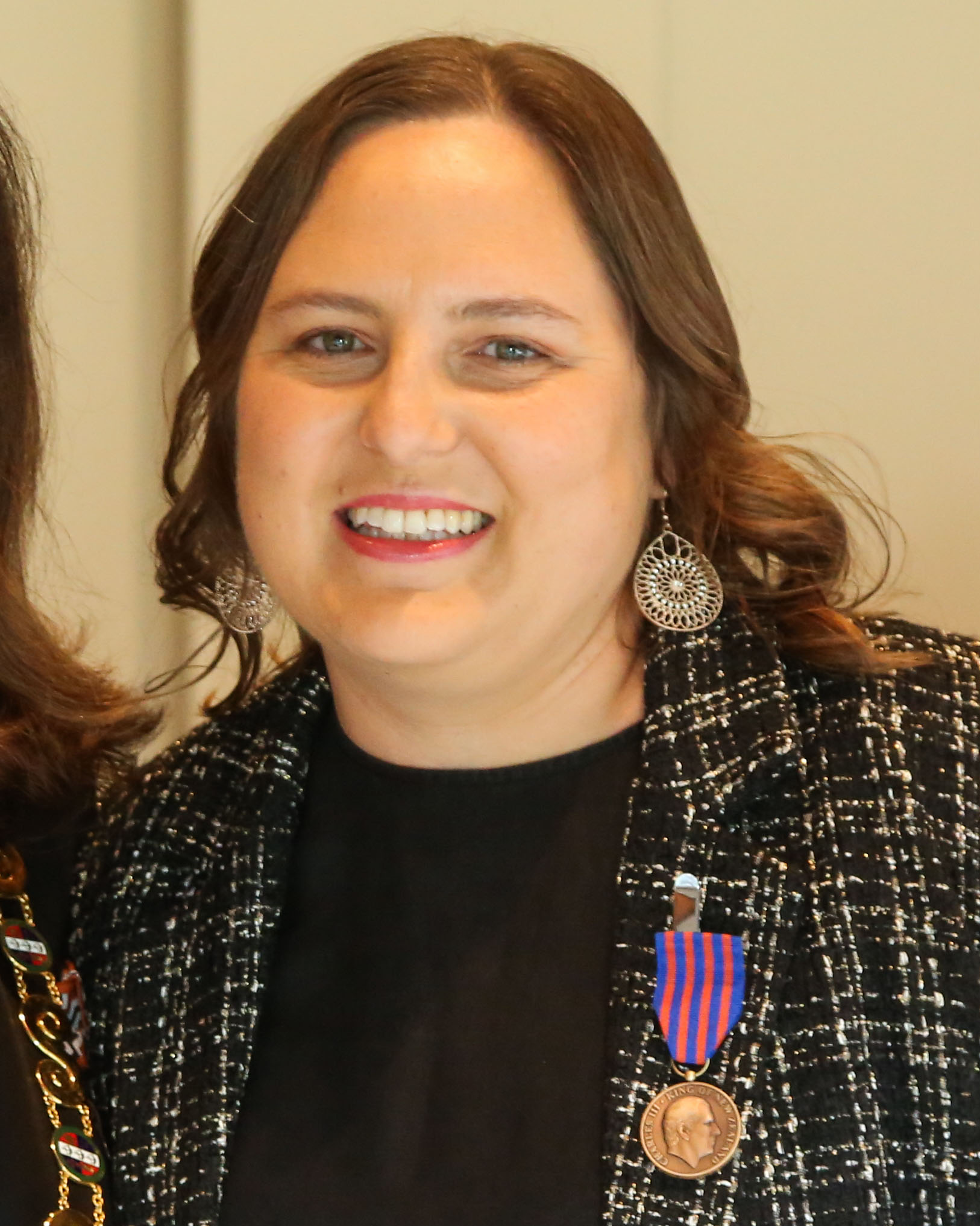
Susan Burke

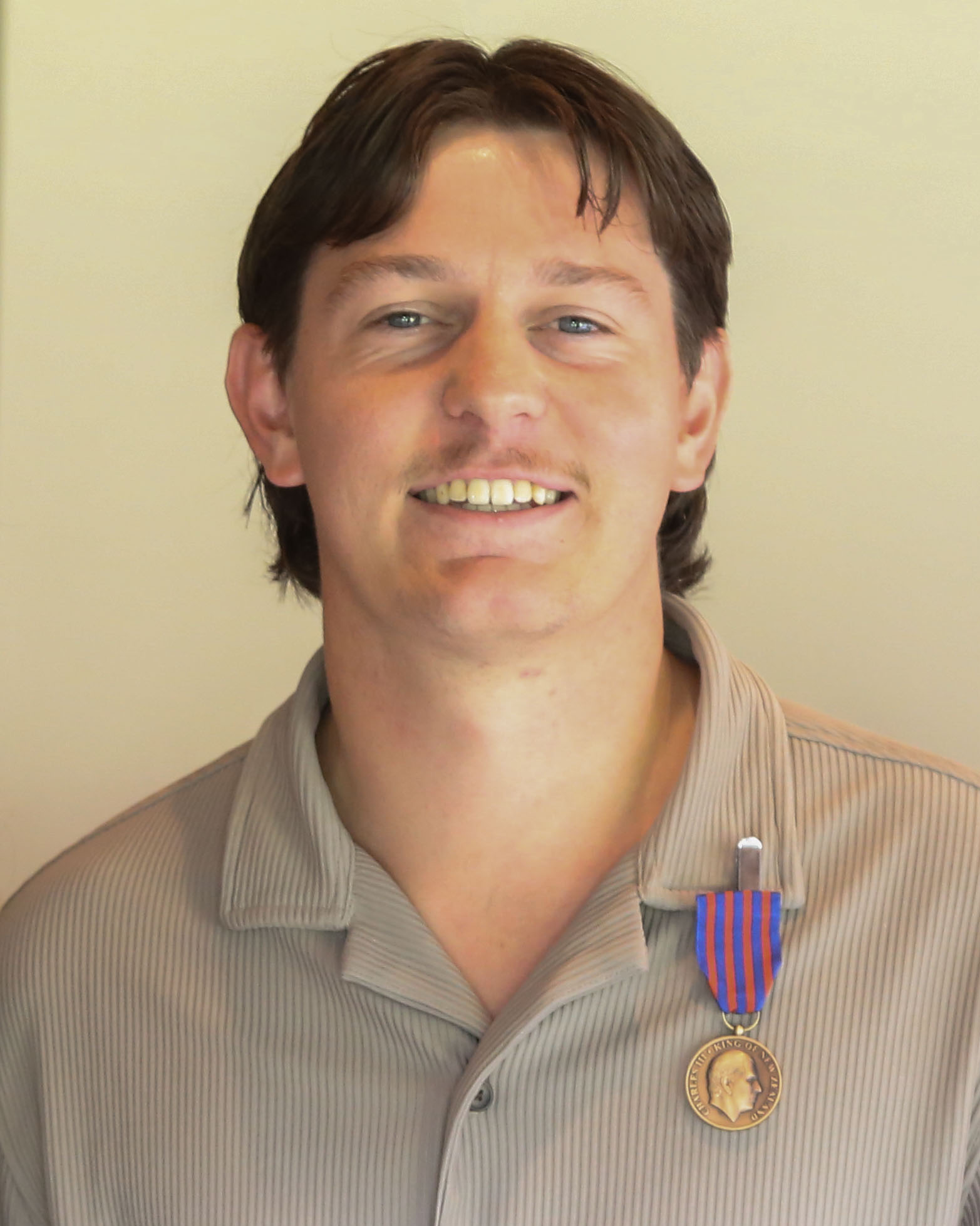
Hayden Cornwell

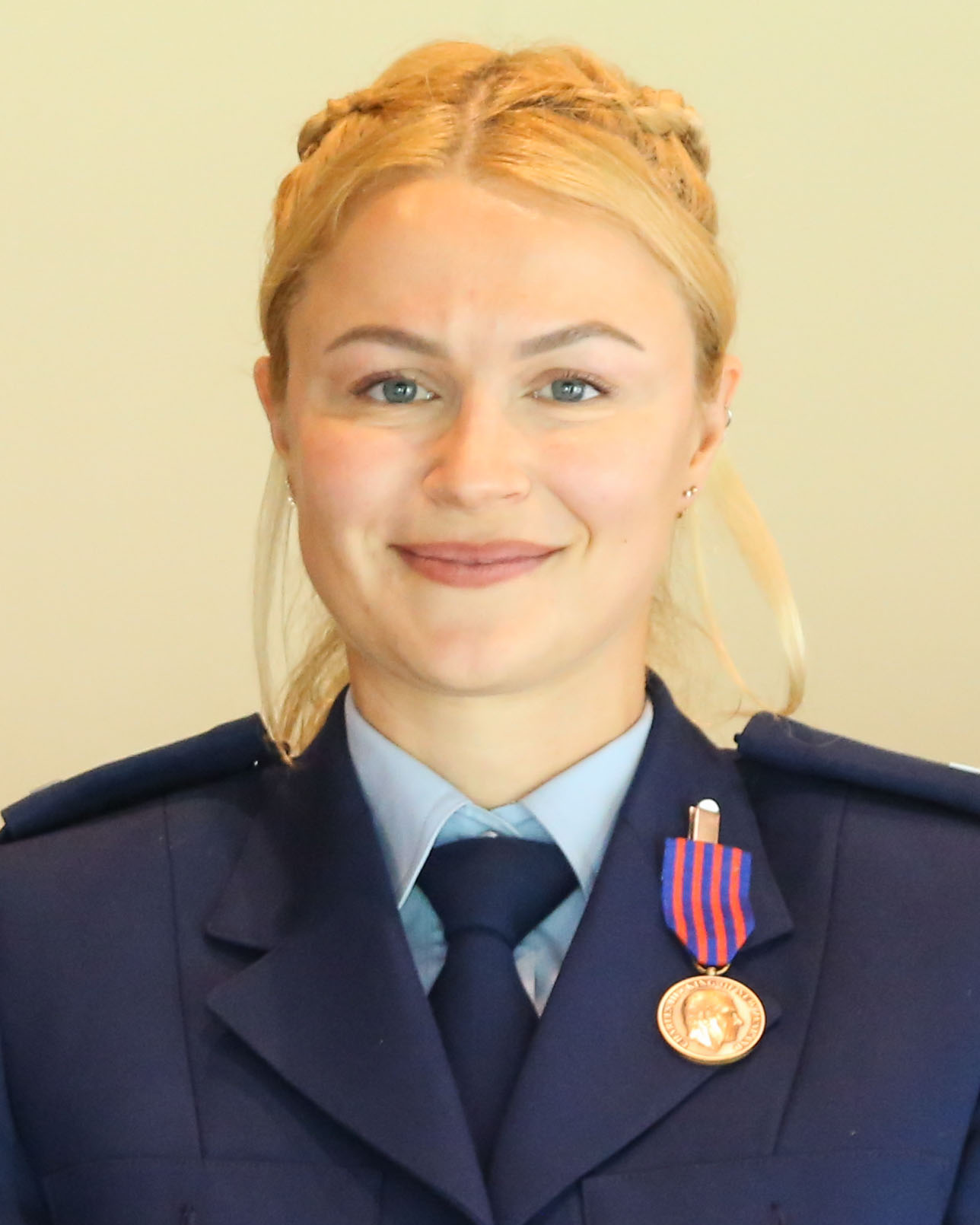
Fritzi Faber

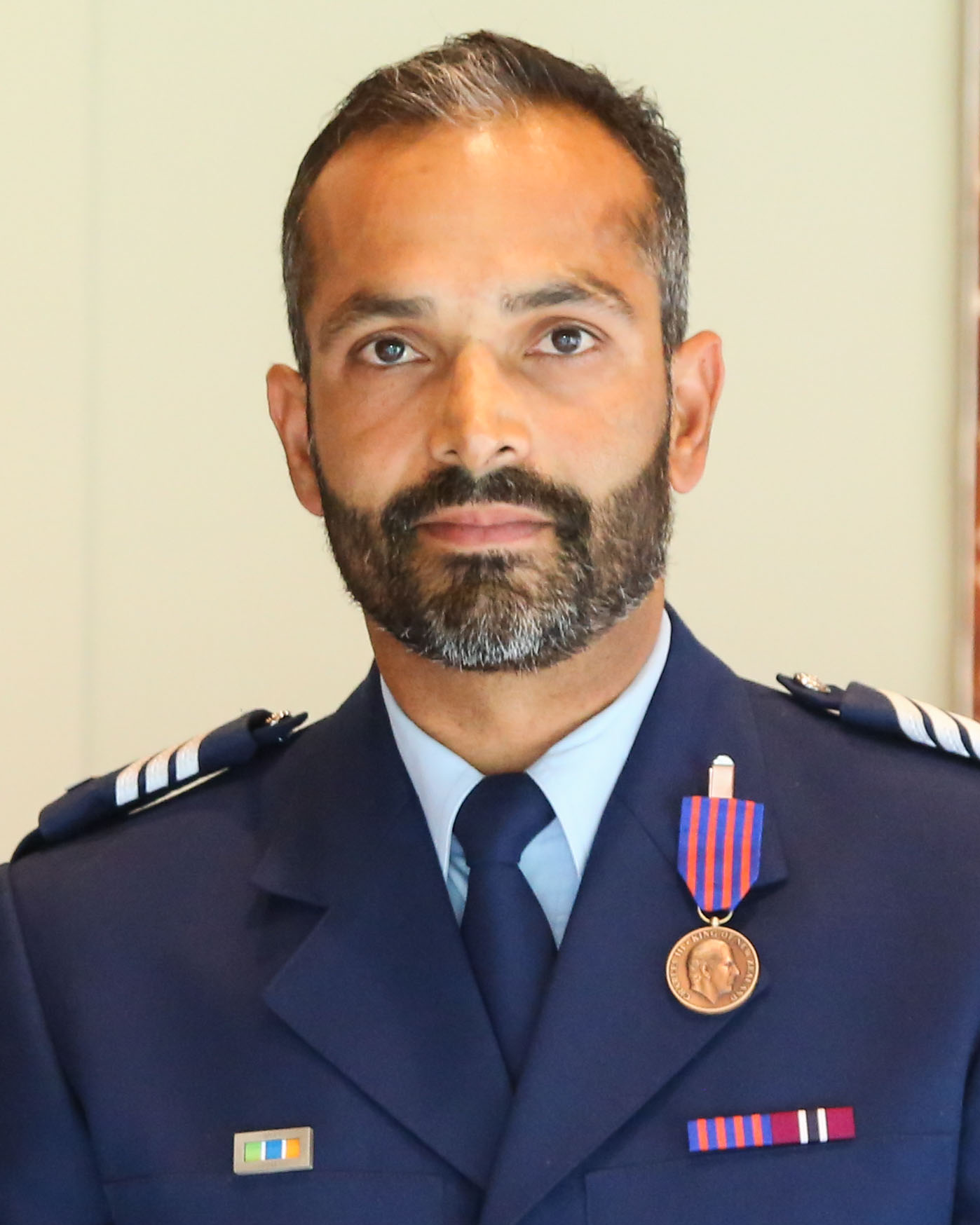
Harry Ghodke

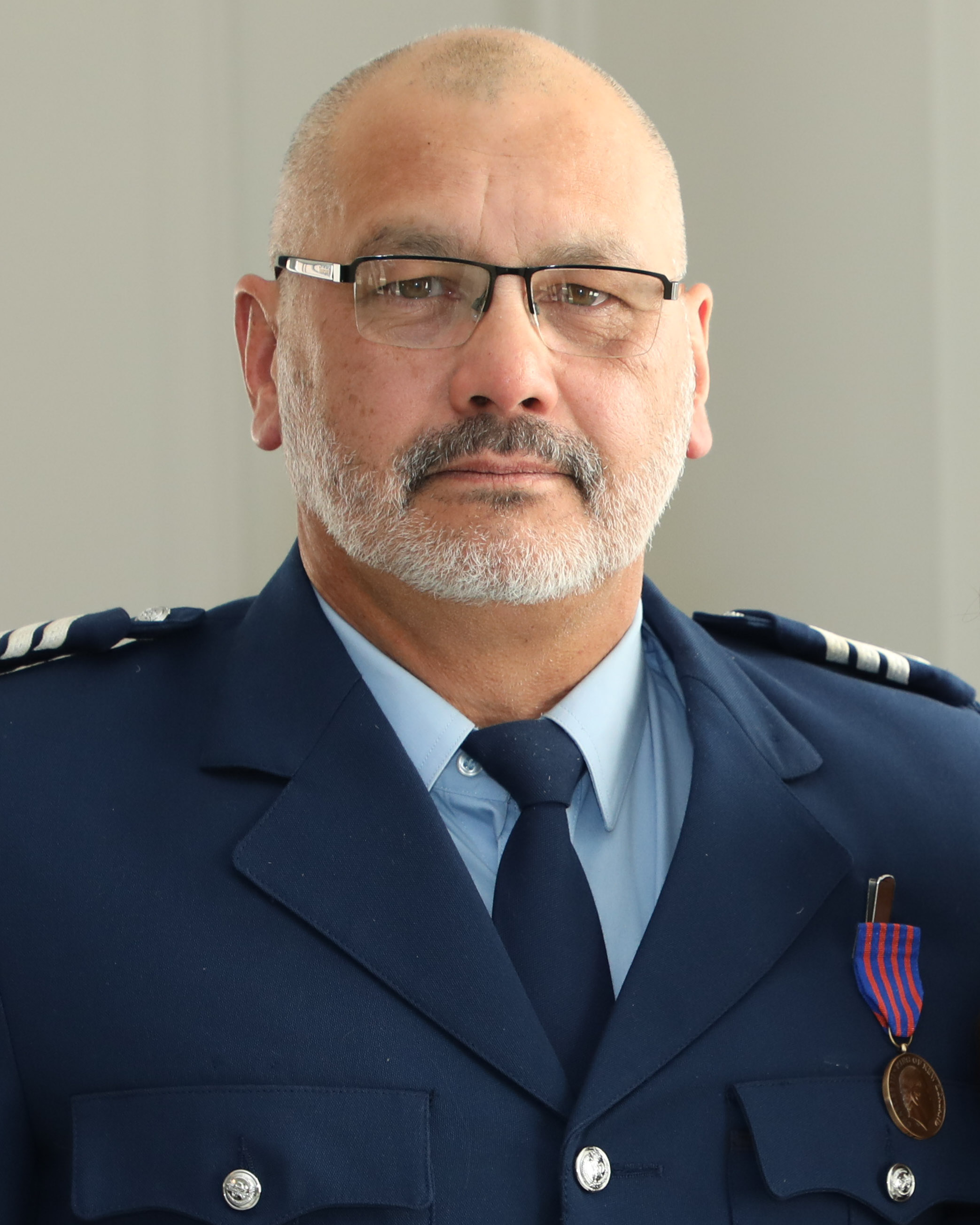
Heath Jones

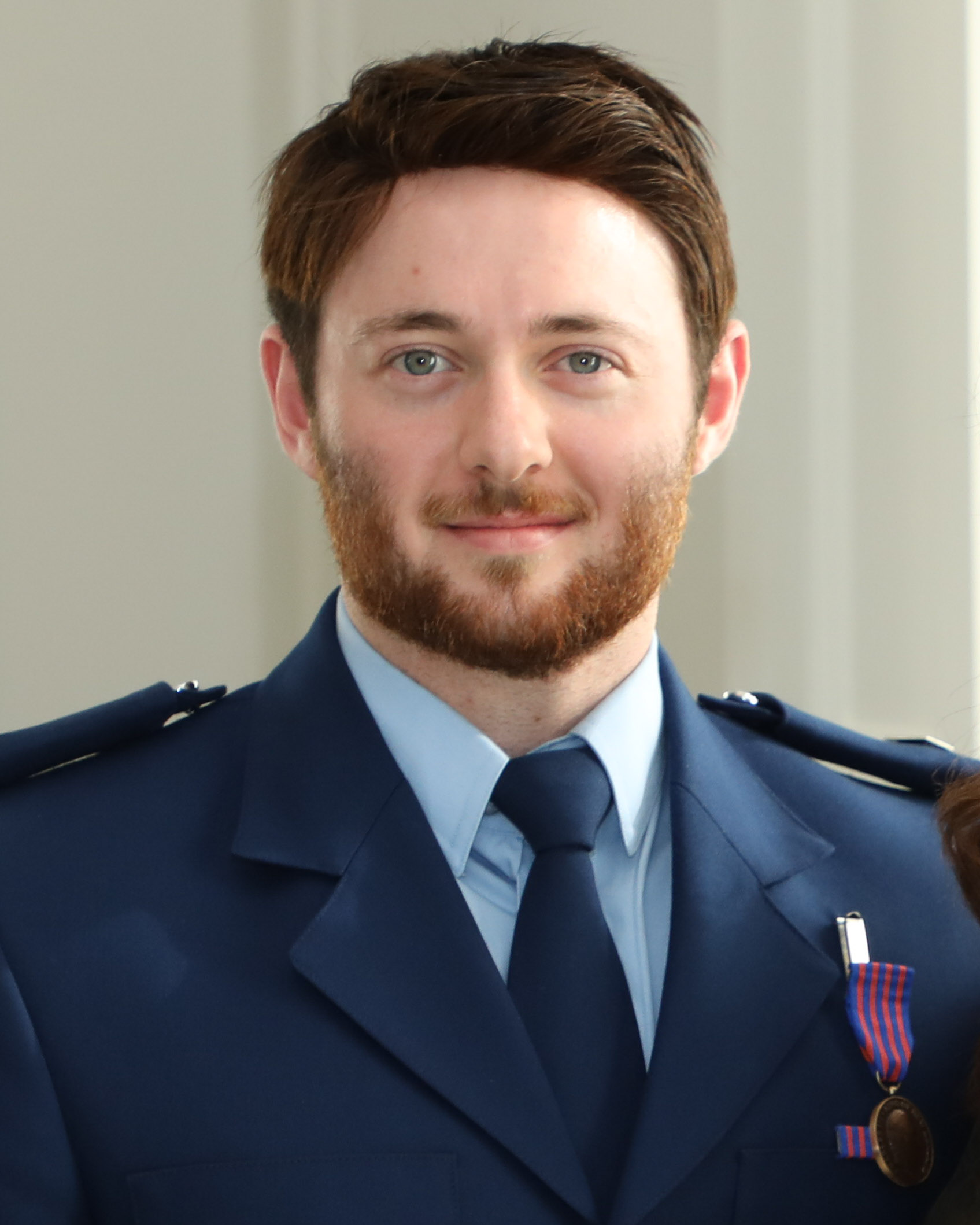
Alexander Kerr
