= 2024 New Zealand bravery awards =

2024 bravery awards
- Previous: 2024 King's Birthday Honours; Next: 2025 New Year Honours
- Type: New Zealand royal honours: New Zealand Bravery Star; New Zealand Bravery Decoration; New Zealand Bravery Medal
- Date: 6 December 2024
- Country: New Zealand

Highlights
- Total recipients: 38

The 2024 New Zealand bravery awards were announced via a Special Honours List on 6 December 2024. The awards recognised the bravery of various individuals during several events, including the Christchurch mosque shootings on 15 March 2019, the 2021 Dunedin supermarket stabbing, the 2021 Auckland supermarket stabbing, the murder of Matthew Hunt on 19 June 2020, the Auckland Anniversary Weekend floods in January 2023, and Cyclone Gabrielle in February 2023.

== New Zealand Bravery Star (NZBS) ==
The New Zealand Bravery Star was awarded for an act of outstanding bravery in a situation of danger:

- Hussein Al-Umari – of Christchurch. (Note: Posthumous award. Deceased 15 March 2019.)
- Jorge Roberto Fuenzalida – of Dunedin.
- Dallas Kerry Wilson – of Dunedin.
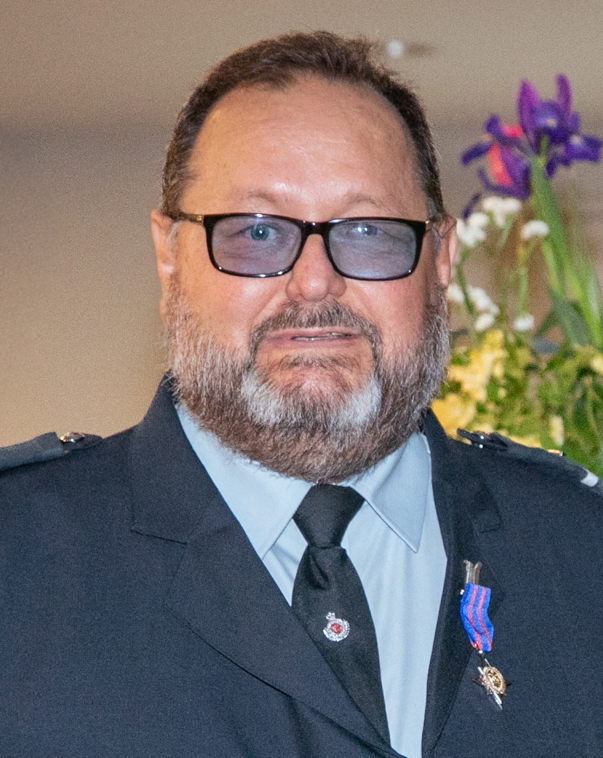
Jorge Fuenzalida

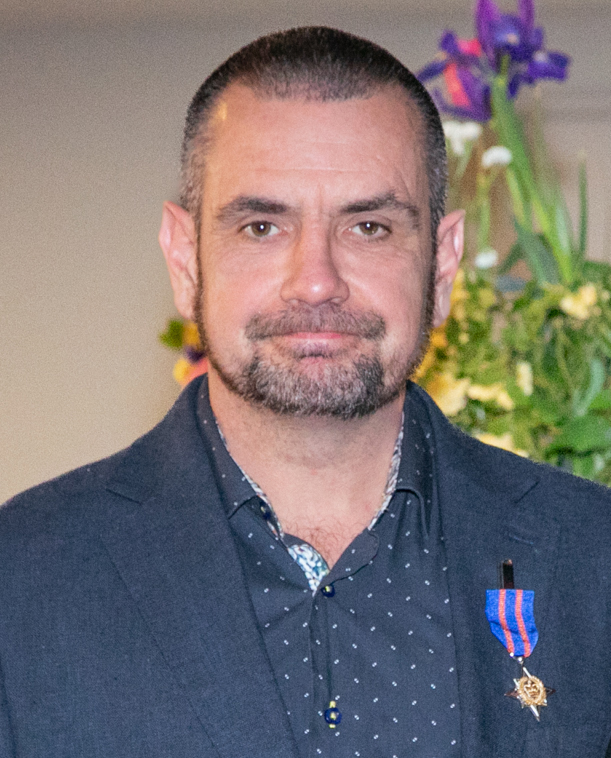
Dallas Wilson

== New Zealand Bravery Decoration (NZBD) ==
The New Zealand Bravery Decoration was awarded for an act of exceptional bravery in a situation of danger:

- Ian Stewart Anderson – of Christchurch.
- Stephen Robert Brodie – of Auckland.
- Johnathan Aaron Curreen – of Auckland.
- Bodey Thomas Foley – of Lower Hutt.
- Constable Matthew Dennis Hunt – of Auckland. (Note: Posthumous award. Deceased 19 June 2020.)
- Roland Ipenburg – of Picton.
- Noel George Jones – of Auckland.
- Vanessa Miller-Andrews – of Dunedin.
- Ross Elliott Tomlinson – of Auckland.
- Andrew Ian Watson – of Blenheim.
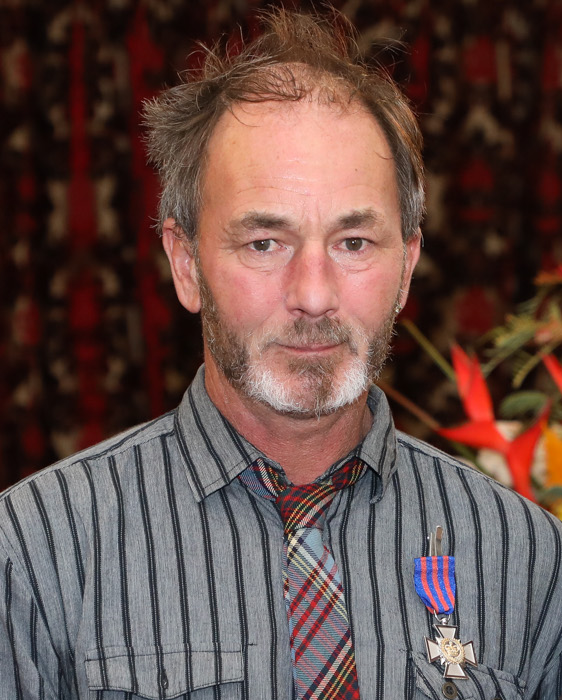
Ian Anderson

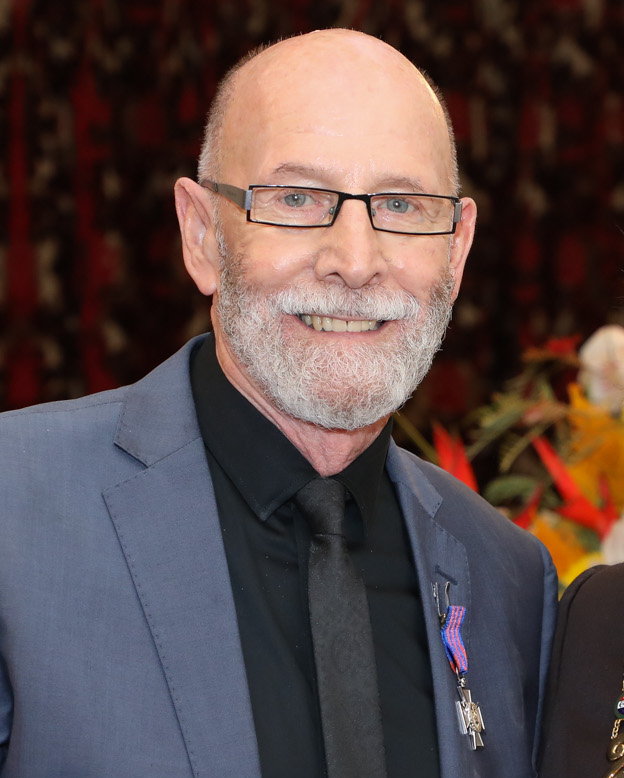
Steve Brodie

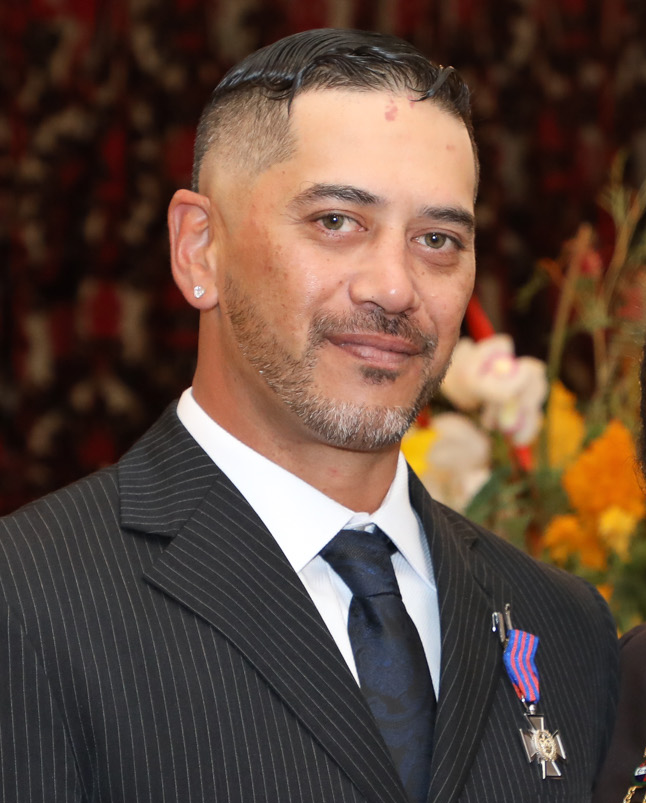
Bodey Foley

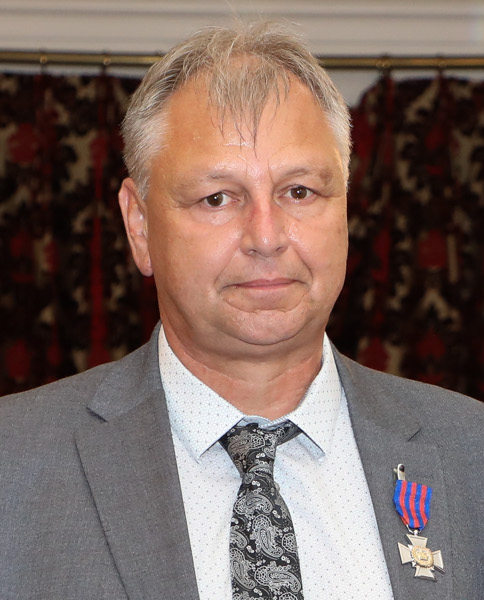
Roland Ipenburg

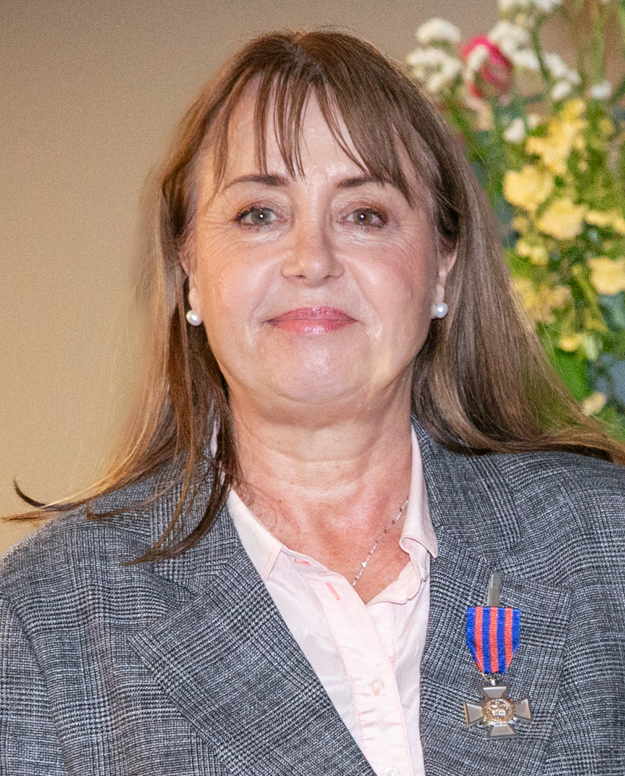
Vanessa Miller‑Andrews

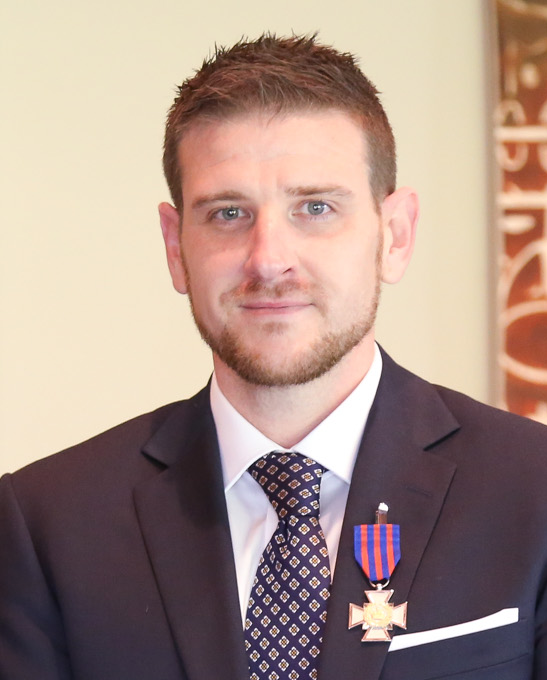
Ross Tomlinson

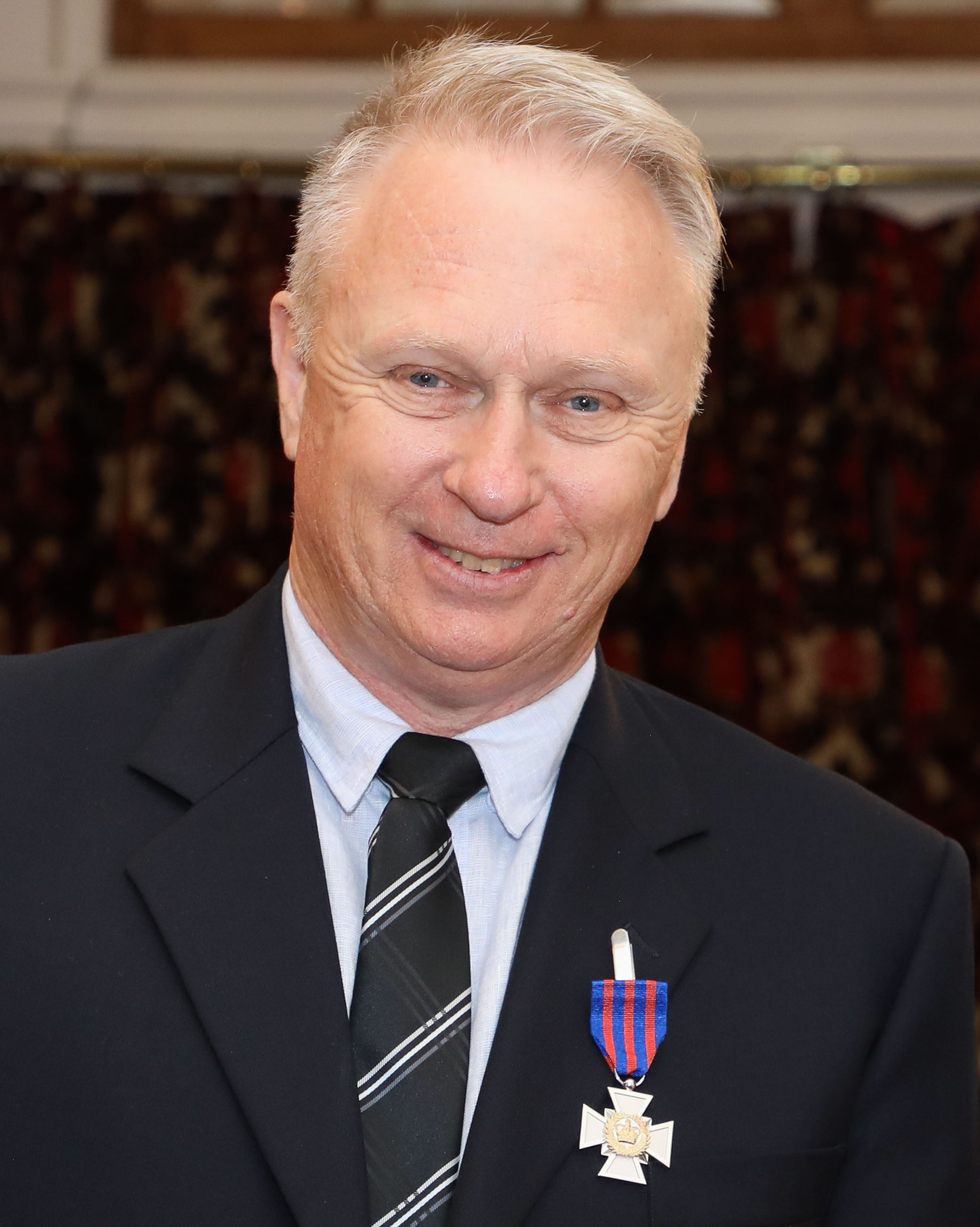
Andy Watson

== New Zealand Bravery Medal (NZBM) ==
The New Zealand Bravery Medal was awarded for an act of bravery:

- Sergeant Sophie Christina Allison – of Porirua.
- Ronald Stewart Andrew – of Mosgiel.
- Michael Thomas John Andrews – of Auckland.
- Meli Graham Leighton Benjamin Balenivalu – of Dunedin.
- Constable Mark Thomas Bancroft – of Hastings.
- Zak Randall Bristow – of Kaikohe.
- Corporal Adam John Brown – of Sanson.
- Hope Angeline Louise Clayton – of Dunedin.
- Constable David Joseph Goldfinch – of Auckland.
- Constable Joshua Claude Head – of Auckland.
- Rodney James Khan – of Auckland.
- Constable Maxwell Allan Lewis – of Auckland.
- Constable Kurtis Anthony Maney – of Hastings.
- Detective Constable Patrick Noiseux – of Hastings.
- Officer A – Armed Offenders Squad, New Zealand Police.
- Officer B – Armed Offenders Squad, New Zealand Police.
- Officer C – Armed Offenders Squad, New Zealand Police.
- Officer D – Armed Offenders Squad, New Zealand Police.
- Ryan Ross Ramsay – of Dunedin.
- Heike Pio Jan Reitsma – of Whanganui.
- John Rodney Sherman – of Auckland.
- Detective Constable Jaime Eliza Stewart – of Hastings.
- Pamela Ruth Thompson – of Waikouaiti.
- Detective Jeremy Franco Toschi – of Dunedin.
- Constable Cameron Joel Whittaker – of Auckland.
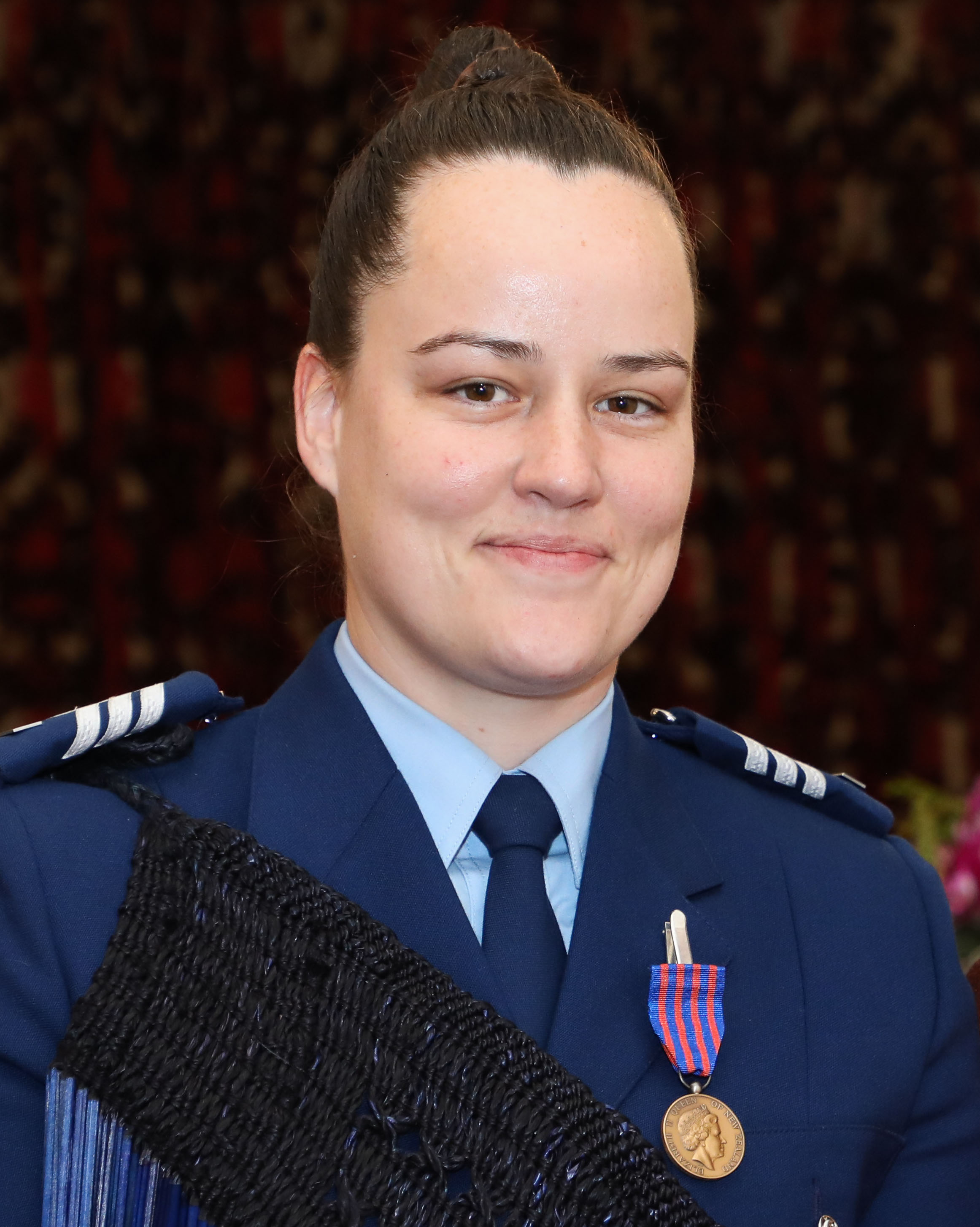
Sophie Allison

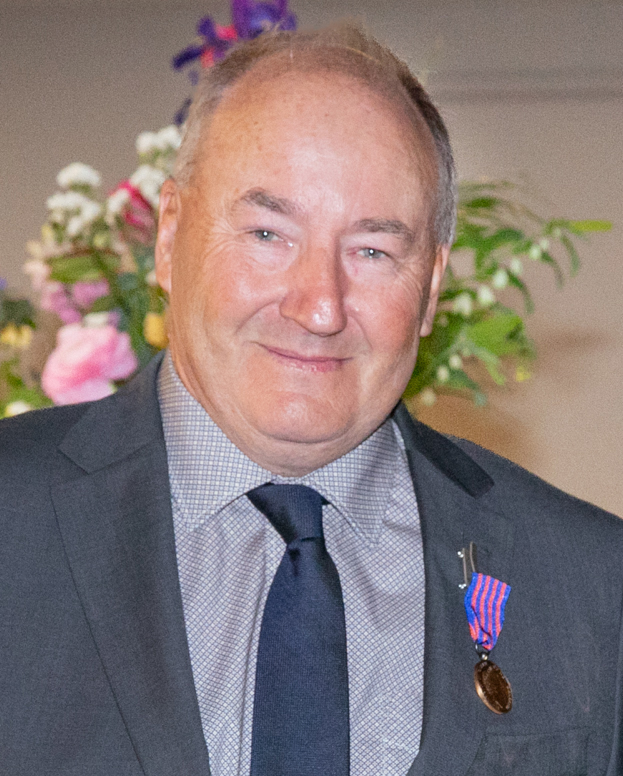
Ron Andrew

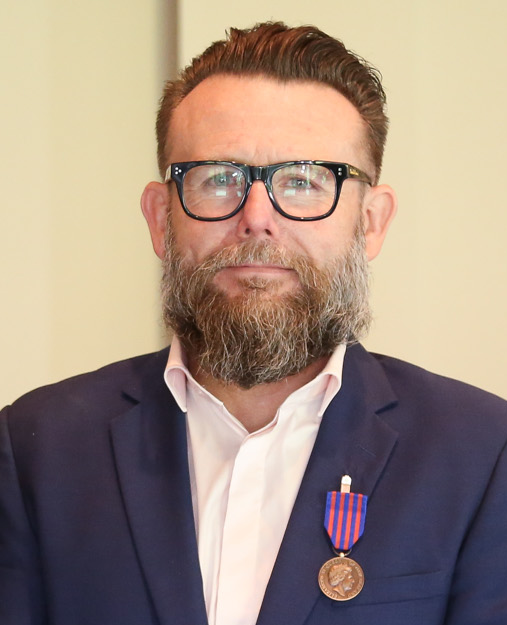
Mike Andrews

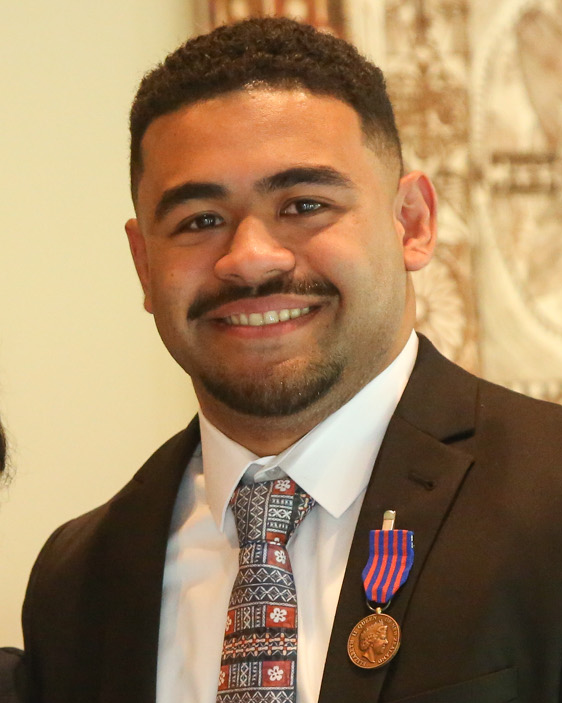
Meli Balenivalu

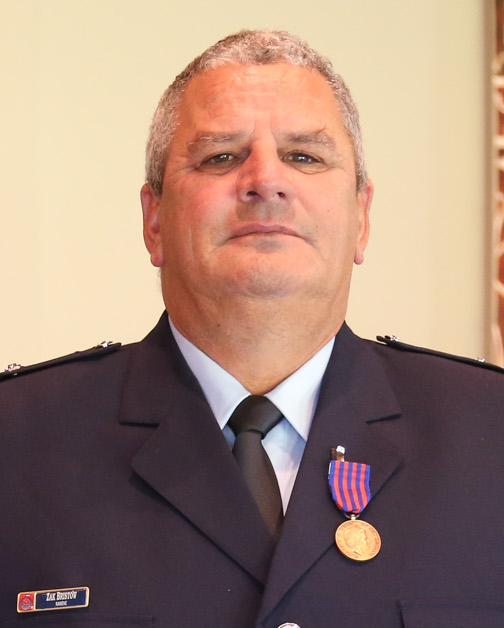
Zak Bristow

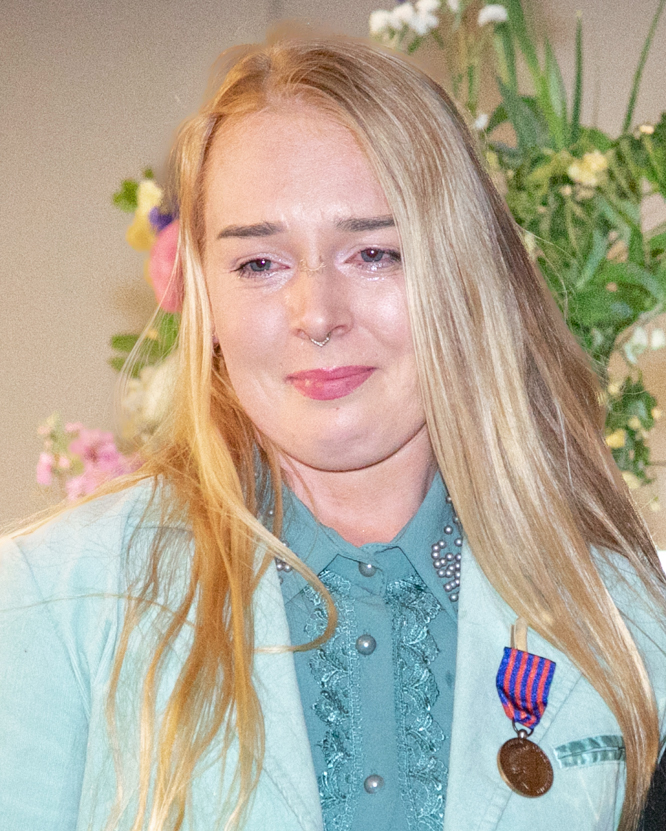
Hope Clayton

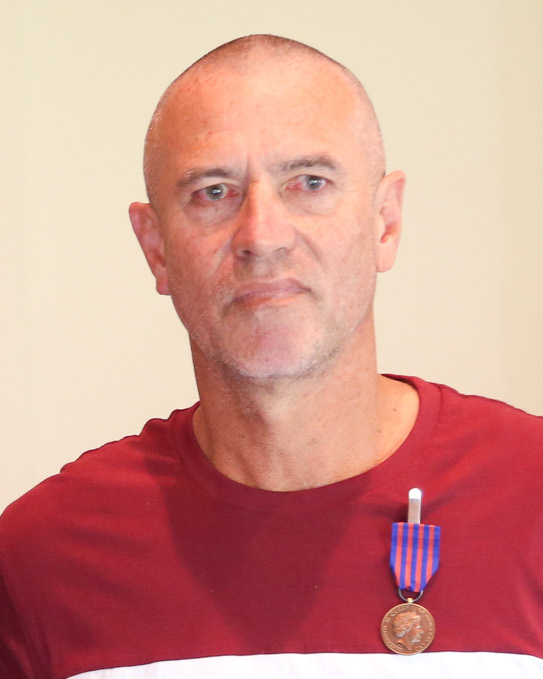
Rod Khan

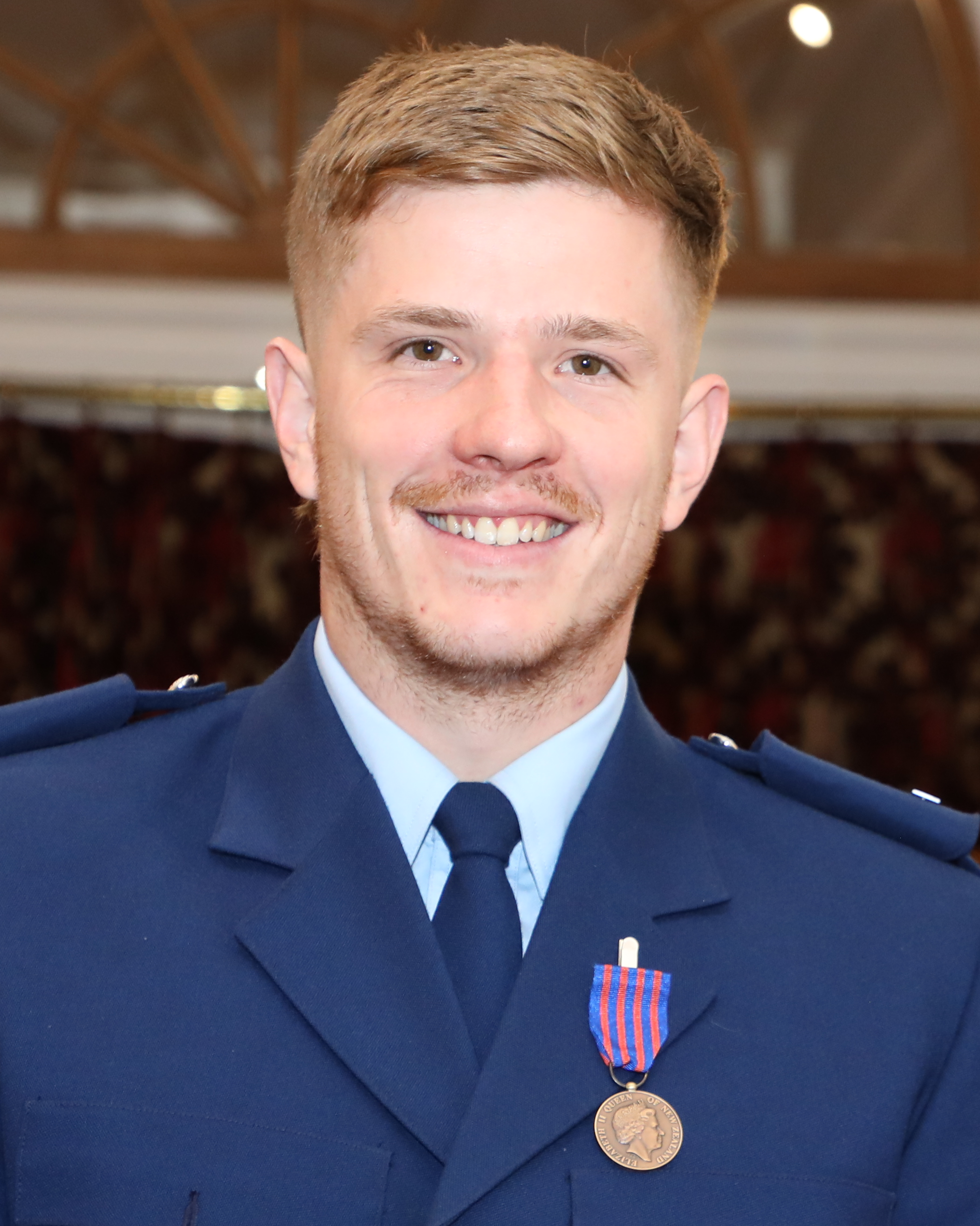
Kurt Maney

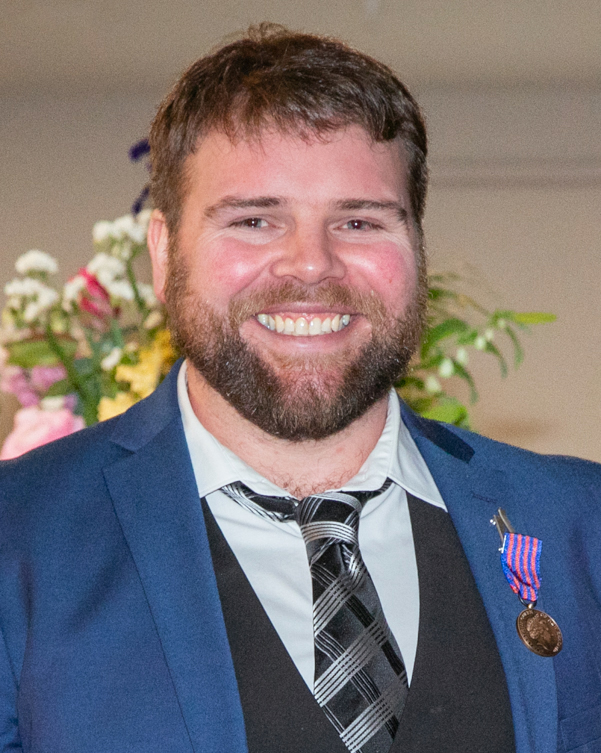
Ryan Ramsay

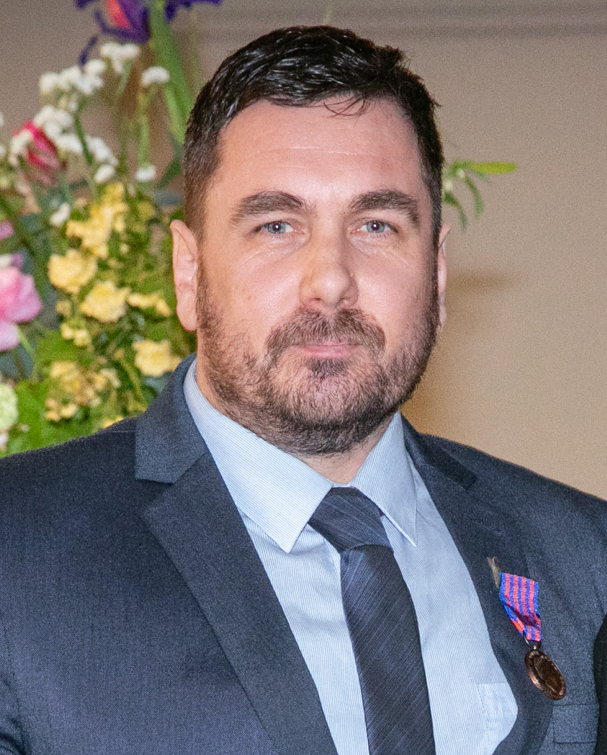
Jeremy Toschi

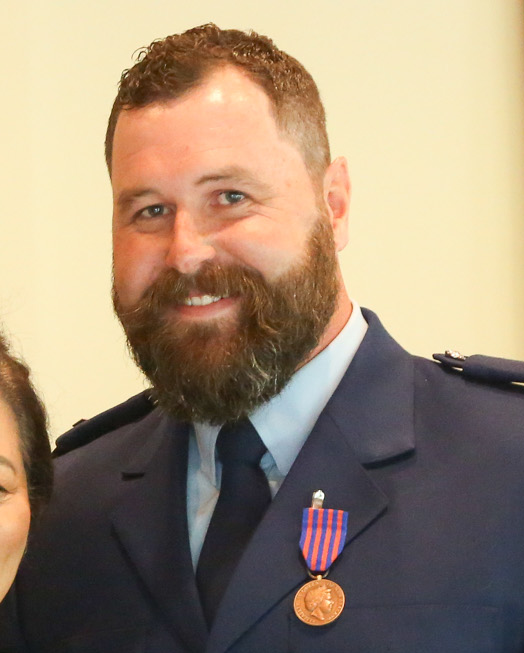
Cameron Whittaker
