= 2005 New Zealand bravery awards =

The 2005 New Zealand bravery awards were announced via a special honours list on 29 January 2005, and recognised 26 people, including four posthumously, for acts of bravery between 1999 and 2004.

== New Zealand Bravery Star (NZBS) ==
- Peter James Deam – of Waimate.

On the morning of 9 April 2000, two brothers aged 13 and 14 years at the time were fishing in the Waihao River around an area known as the "box"; so-called because of its wooden boxed internal waterway channel. While walking alongside the box structure they began sinking into the stones, but managed to get away. The younger boy lost a gumboot during the incident, so the older boy went back to retrieve it and became trapped. The younger boy ran for help and found Mr Deam in the nearby car park. By the time Mr Deam reached the box, the older boy was buried up to his chest in the stones. Mr Deam unsuccessfully attempted to pull him out by using his jacket as a rope. He then instructed the younger boy to hold onto the end of the jacket while he ran to get a rope from his car. He looped the rope under the sinking boy's arms and shoulders, however, the boy continued to sink. Mr Deam then drove to the nearest house, but the occupant had no telephone so both men returned to the boy who was by then up to his neck in the stones. Pulling on the rope only seemed to hasten the sinking, so the second man went to a nearby farm to call for help and upon his return could only see the boy's hands. Mr Deam had continued with his efforts to rescue the boy, including trying to dig him out, keeping his head above the water and his mouth free of shingle. Another man arrived to help and Mr Deam decided to enter the box channel from the opposite end and try to push or pull the boy from underneath. He removed most of his clothing and entered the dark, confined and extremely dangerous channel, pushing against the strong current and moving shingle. He located the correct position by knocking and calling out to the third man and was able to find the boy's leg to try and push him free. At this time a member of the Fire Service arrived to assist wearing a wetsuit. Mr Deam was taken away for medical attention shortly afterwards suffering from the extreme cold. Heavy equipment was later called in to remove the boy, who had by that time drowned.

- John Bell Fenton Penetama – of Northland.
- Trevor Francis Mokaraka – Northland. Posthumous award.

On the morning of Friday 10 December 1999, a man entered his home and instructed his defacto partner to go to the shops for some cigarettes. While she was away, he killed their children by cutting their throats. When she returned to their home he attempted to cut her throat and stab her to death. Her screams were heard by two neighbours, Mr Fenton Penetana and Mr Mokaraka, who both went to her aid. Upon entering the house they were confronted by the man who was attempting to kill his partner on the lounge floor. The two men tried to disarm him and in the process Mr Mokaraka received a fatal stab wound to the chest. Mr Fenton Penetana and the woman continued to defend themselves against the man's crazed attacks with the knife. After a fight lasting some considerable time, Mr Fenton Penetana managed to disarm the man before he and the woman were able to make their escape. The man then locked himself inside the house with his two deceased children and inflicted knife wounds to himself. These were not fatal. He was subsequently charged with three counts of murder and two counts of attempted murder, but was found not guilty on grounds of insanity.

- Damian Peter John Klavs – of Wellington; constable, New Zealand Police.

On the evening of 16 June 1999, Constable Klavs was patrolling alone when he saw a van being driven erratically on Jackson Street, Petone. The van had previously been reported stolen. He stopped the van, which contained eight young people and approached the driver, asking for his driver's licence. The driver then presented a sawn-off shotgun at him, resting the weapon on the window sill only a foot or so from the Constable. The driver pulled the trigger, but the firearm did not discharge as the safety catch was on. Constable Klavs returned to his Police car and called for assistance. The van left the scene at speed and Constable Klavs followed while reporting on the direction of travel and requesting Police backup. In East Street, the van turned and drove back towards Constable Klavs, ramming his vehicle and pushing the driver's side into a concrete wall. The Constable was forced to leave the Police car via the passenger's door and, fearing for his life, left the scene on foot, now pursued by the van. The Constable took cover behind a trailer, while the van first passed him and then returned again. Constable Klavs left the trailer and ran along the street, pursued by the van with the occupants abusing him and threatening his life. The driver fired the shotgun at Constable Klavs, but missed him. The van then left the scene. The driver was subsequently convicted of attempting to murder Constable Klavs.

- Jeanette Ruth Park – of Marton; sergeant, New Zealand Police.

At about 1.00 p.m. on 5 July 2002, Detective Jeanette Park and Detective Constable Duncan Taylor went to an address in Taipo Road, Rongotea to warn a local family that a person known to them, and who was the subject of a Domestic Protection Order in respect of a family member, may have returned to the area. While talking to the family they saw the person drive past the house. The two officers, who were unarmed, pursued his vehicle which stopped, but when they got out of their vehicle the other person drove off and returned to the Taipo Road address. Both vehicles stopped in the driveway of the house. As the two Police officers left their car the male occupant of the other presented a rifle at Detective Constable Taylor and without warning, fired a single shot which killed him instantly. Detective Park considered going to the aid of her colleague but saw the offender point the rifle at her. He fired a shot, which missed. He then fired another shot, hitting her in the buttock and inflicting a serious wound. Nevertheless, she was able to jump the cattle stop at the end of the driveway as the offender fired a fourth shot. Believing she was being hunted by the offender and knowing she had to get help; Detective Park used cover to go some 500 metres over farmland to a farm-house. She alerted the occupant to the danger and reported the situation to Police Operations. She then began taking the occupant to a place of safety but saw that another Police car had arrived and was parked too close to the house where the shooting had taken place. Detective Park made her way up a ditch to the patrol car to warn the officers to move to a place of safety. By this time the pain from her wound was severe and she could no longer stand. She crawled along the roadside and warned another officer of the danger. Detective Park was then evacuated to hospital to have her wound treated. The family were eventually rescued unharmed and the offender arrested. The actions of the two officers had given the family time to barricade themselves in a room from which they eventually made their escape unharmed.

== New Zealand Bravery Decoration (NZBD) ==
- Geoffrey Frank Knight – of Tapanui; lately constable, New Zealand Police.

Shortly after midnight on 4 June 2001, Constable Knight attended a violent domestic incident near Tapanui. The two occupants of a house had been traumatised by the actions of the male occupant's brother, who had broken into the house and assaulted the male occupant, causing serious injury. He threatened to kill the female occupant and her children and had unsuccessfully attempted to open their fire-arms cabinet. By this time, the female occupant and children had sought safety in a bedroom. Unable to gain access to them, the intruder retreated, armed with a knife and threatening to kill. At this point, Constable Knight arrived alone and called for Police backup, which he knew would be up to 30 to 40 minutes away. The intruder reappeared, resisted arrest and engaged in a violent struggle with Constable Knight, who managed to restrain him for approximately 30 minutes until local Fire Brigade members arrived to assist. The offender was subsequently charged with numerous offences.

- Brian John Pickering – of Rotorua.

On 25 September 2000, Mr John Painting and his son Matthew were tramping in the Kaimanawa Ranges. At an altitude of almost 5,000 feet, they were caught in what was later reported as a "50 year storm" with freezing temperatures, 70 knot winds and blizzard conditions. They were found by chance in a distressed condition and suffering from hypothermia by Mr Brian Pickering, who was on the first day of a six day journey into the Kaimanawa Forest Park. Using his skill and experience, Mr Pickering positioned the two men below a track, placed them in their sleeping bags and gave them food. He also tried to wrap them with a tent to shield them from the driving wind. He then dialled 111 on his cell phone and alerted the Police to the situation. He was able to provide details of their location and names, and requested assistance from the search and rescue organisation. He managed to get both men into one sleeping bag and remained with them, keeping them as warm as possible until help arrived. Throughout the incident he kept in regular contact with the search and rescue headquarters. Mr Pickering put his own life at risk by staying with the two men, who would have died in the storm had it not been for his actions.

== New Zealand Bravery Medal (NZBM) ==
- Roger Terry Blumhardt – of Tūrangi.
- Brendan John Dobbyn – of Tūrangi.
- Kevin Albert Singer – of Tūrangi.

On the night of 25 September 2000, Mr Blumhardt, Mr Dobbyn and Mr Singer were the members of a Search and Rescue Team that went out in response to Mr Pickering's 111 distress call. Mr Pickering had gone to the aid of Mr Painting and his son who had got into difficulties at an altitude of 5,000 feet in the Kaimanawa Range during what has been described as a "50 year storm". The three men left Turangi at 11.00 p.m. in pitch darkness and at the height of the storm. Progress was slow; taking two and a half hours to cover one kilometre. At times they crawled on their hands and knees in wind-chill conditions at times in excess of minus 30 degrees below zero. They declined suggestions from Search and Rescue staff to turn back believing that they may be the only hope for Mr Pickering, Mr Painting and his son. Eventually, however, they were forced by the conditions to cease their rescue attempt and seek shelter.

- Patrick Martin John Burke – of Cambridge; lately detective, New Zealand Police.

On 31 August 1999, Detective Burke was on patrol by himself in an unmarked Police car when he was advised that a man had shot and wounded a woman at a nearby address in Stoke. The woman had recently taken out a temporary protection order against the offender. The offender had left the address, hi–jacked a car causing injury to the driver, and driven off. Shortly afterwards, Detective Burke noticed the offender pass him going in the opposite direction. He turned his vehicle around and chased the offender's car, with his siren and red and blue lights activated. The man continued into an industrial site where he stopped suddenly, opened his door and emerged carrying a shotgun. Detective Burke, who was unarmed, stopped his car only four metres away from the offender, opened his door, stood up and called three times for the man to drop his firearm. The man then placed the muzzle of the gun in his mouth and fired the weapon, severely wounding himself. He was later convicted of the attempted murder of the woman.

- Paul Lindsay Chandler – of Akaroa.
- Peter James Duncan – of Christchurch.
- Graham John Watkin Jones – of Christchurch.

On 1 October 2001 a dangerous bank robber entered a bank in Akaroa wearing a balaclava and armed with a rifle. He pointed the gun at the two tellers and demanded the contents of the tills. As he was leaving, he passed a customer entering the bank, who raised the alarm. At this, the robber ran away. Mr Chandler observed the robber running from the bank carrying a gun, and decided to chase him. He was soon joined in his pursuit by Mr Duncan and Mr Jones and the three men pursued the robber down an alleyway. Realising he was being chased, the robber stopped and pointed the firearm at them. He then turned and continued to run. The three men also continued their pursuit. The robber then got into a stolen vehicle. Mr Duncan caught up with it and tried to open the driver's door, but was unsuccessful. He recorded the registration number, which was later given to Police. Mr Chandler also caught up the vehicle and broke the passenger's side window in an unsuccessful attempt to prevent it from leaving the area. The assistance of Mr Chandler, Mr Duncan and Mr Jones, and the information they gave the Police, resulted in the subsequent apprehension and conviction of three men.

- Daniel James Cleaver – of Northland; constable, New Zealand Police.

At 1 am on 4 September 2002 Constable Cleaver of Kaikohe was on duty alone when he was called to attend to a report of burglars at a chemist shop at Ōkaihau, 15 kilometres away. On arrival, he disturbed two men who ran from the scene and got into a vehicle. He attempted to stop them by smashing the driver's window and removing the ignition keys. The vehicle, however, drove off, side-swiping the Police vehicle, with Constable Cleaver just managing to pull his arm away. He pursued the men, who stopped their vehicle and reversed it into the Police car. They then drove off at speed, with Constable Cleaver continuing the pursuit for some four kilometres before they stopped again. The constable also stopped at a safe distance, but this time the men completed a U-turn and drove their vehicle at speed towards Constable Cleaver, hitting his vehicle in the driver's door and partially knocking it into a drain. The offenders drove off again, still pursued by Constable Cleaver. Again they completed a U-turn and drove directly towards the Constable. He attempted to avoid them by reversing his vehicle, but they struck it head on, immobilising their own vehicle. Both offenders then ran into bush, while Constable Cleaver remained at the scene and assisted with organising a cordon until a dog unit from Whangārei arrived some 30 minutes later.

- Graham Robert Ford – of Auckland; sergeant, New Zealand Police.

On 17 November 2001, the Police were called to a violent domestic incident in Northcote, Auckland. By the time Sergeant Graham Ford arrived, a man had already assaulted two women, threatened to kill everyone present with a large carving knife, thrown a television set at a Police Constable and resisted pepper spray. Sergeant Ford observed the man lifting his one month-old daughter into the air with one hand, while holding the knife in the other. Sergeant Ford and his staff forcibly entered the house and instructed the man to drop the knife, at which point the man partly undressed the baby, exposing her chest while making motions to stab her. Pepper spray was again used, but was only effective in distracting the man momentarily. Sergeant Ford used this moment to tackle the man, throwing his knife out of reach, while other officers restrained him. The baby was saved from harm and the offender was subsequently convicted of numerous charges.

- William John (Bill) Gilchrist – of Otago.

On 27 October 2002, Mr Gilchrist, aged almost 70 at the time, rescued a man from the surf off the Arawhata River. The man had been swept into the river while whitebaiting. Despite trying to swim to safety, he was carried out by the strong current into the surf on the river bar. The river was running higher than usual because of heavy rain the previous night and the sea was significantly rougher than normal. The man's family noticed what had happened and tried to persuade other whitebaiters with boats to go to his rescue. All but one, Mr Gilchrist, declined because of the dangerous conditions. The man had managed to stay afloat on his back in the cold water for approximately 15 minutes before Mr Gilchrist reached him in his small aluminium dingy. He called out for the man to hold on to a handle on the back of the boat, as conditions were too rough for the man to attempt to climb aboard. At this stage a wave broke over the top of the dingy, which was nearly swamped. Despite the conditions, Mr Gilchrist managed to tow the man up the river for a few hundred metres to the safety of the river bank.

- Matthew Hollis – of Palmerston North.

At about 4.00 a.m. on 26 November 1999, Mr Hollis was at a party when a female friend alerted the partygoers to a fire in a house across the road. Mr Hollis and some friends ran across the road and soon realised that the garden hose would be of no help in dousing the flames as the fire had too great a hold. Two friends of Mr Hollis forced a door open and Mr Hollis crawled into the house, followed by another man. By this time the windows in the house were starting to explode, but Mr Hollis was able to hear the screams of the children trapped inside. He buried his head in his jersey to try and protect himself from the smoke and went about finding the trapped children. He managed to find six of them, throwing them out of a window to another man who caught them on the outside of the house. Mr Hollis then left the house, but realising another child was still inside, re–entered the building to rescue it. He went back into the building twice more before the children's mother advised him that all her children were safe.

- Sergeant Christopher Mark Jowsey – of Feilding; Royal New Zealand Air Force.

Sergeant (now Flight Sergeant) Jowsey was the winch man on an RNZAF Iroquois helicopter conducting rescue and evacuation tasks on 16 February 2004, following catastrophic flooding throughout the Manawatū, Rangitikei and Wanganui regions. His aircraft was informed that two men were caught in the floodwaters of the Whangaehu River, near the township of Kauangaroa. On arriving at the scene, the first man was quickly located chest deep in water. Sergeant Jowsey was winched down and the man safely recovered. The aircraft captain then spotted the second man being swept downstream. The aircraft was quickly positioned above the man, who was attempting to cling to a fence, but the force of the water was such that the fence ripped away. The crew realised that this could be a one-chance rescue as the man was being quickly swept away and the river was full of debris including trees, hay bales, dead stock and other debris. The aircraft was then positioned downstream and Sergeant Jowsey was winched into the river. As the man came within reach, Sergeant Jowsey caught hold of him, but a combination of his weight, the force of the water and the tension from the winch cable dragged both men under water. At this point, while he was completely submerged, one of Sergeant Jowsey's boots became snagged on an underwater obstruction. He managed to kick free of the obstruction and, having maintained a firm hold of the survivor throughout, placed him in the rescue strop. This is not a simple exercise on land, and in these circumstances required great presence of mind and determination. Sergeant Jowsey then assisted the survivor to the aircraft. Had Sergeant Jowsey not been winched clear of the water, the man would very likely have perished. Also, as Sergeant Jowsey well knew, if the winch cable had snagged while in the water, it would have to be cut away, placing the rescuer himself in grave danger. Sergeant Jowsey subsequently completed three more rescues that day. Throughout the day he displayed courage, professionalism and great compassion for the people he rescued.

- Ethan James Kennedy – of Whangārei.

At about 4.30 p.m. on 3 February 2003, Ethan Kennedy, aged 12, was at home with his father when his father's partner arrived at the house with her former partner. Ethan's father walked outside where he was shot in the hand and stomach with a 410 gauge shotgun. Ethan came out of the house and confronted his father's attacker, screaming and yelling at him to leave his father alone. The attacker pointed the shotgun at Ethan, who pushed him and ran to get help from a neighbouring property. The attacker left the scene, and Ethan returned with a neighbour to help make his father comfortable before meeting the ambulance and Police and giving a calm and accurate account of what had occurred, together with a description of the offender and the vehicle he has used. There is a high probability that his father would have been shot again if Ethan had not intervened. The attacker later pleaded guilty to several offences including attempted murder. Ethan, at a very young age, displayed a high level of bravery in intervening to help his father.

- Hamish Everett Neal – Waimate. Posthumous award.

On 10 February 2000, Mr Hamish Neal, aged 15 years, was on a school trip to the Waihao River. While swimming in the river at a point known as the "Black Hole", a fellow student got into trouble and sank beneath the surface. Mr Neal swam over to him and attempted to pull him to safety. Mr Neal was unsuccessful in the attempt and was instead pulled down with him and both students drowned. Both students were members of a special class for children with varying degrees of learning and behavioural difficulty at Waimate High School.

- David Leonard O'Loughlin – of Raglan.

At about 1.15 p.m. on 11 July 2002, Mr O'Loughlin and a companion were in a vehicle driving in a southerly direction along State Highway One between Whakapara and Hukerenui. Immediately in front of him was a vehicle containing two women. Suddenly the women's vehicle veered to the left, careered over a metal guard barrier and off the side of a bridge. The vehicle then travelled some distance in the swollen river before came to rest almost fully submerged. Mr O'Loughlin immediately stopped and without regard for his own safety plunged into the water and managed to rescue one of the women from the sinking vehicle. He swam her back to the safety of the riverbank and then returned to the then submerged vehicle to attempt to retrieve the other woman. He made about five attempts, but was unsuccessful. He and his companion then comforted the rescued woman until the Police and an ambulance arrived.

- Mark Charles Smith – of Canterbury

On 13 July 2001, Mr Smith was travelling to Christchurch on Highway 73 near Kirwee, when the vehicle in front, driven by a woman, hit a patch of ice and collided with a fully laden concrete truck. The truck crushed the car and the woman was trapped inside it under the truck, with flames beginning to spread along the underside of the wreckage. Mr Smith immediately stopped his car and went to her aid. After some considerable difficulty, he was able to force open the door of the woman's car and free her from her seat belt. All the time flames were licking around them. The driver of the concrete truck then managed to back his vehicle off the wreckage of the car at which time its petrol tank exploded and the vehicle was incinerated.

- Caine Francis Spick – of Northland.

On 18 April 2003, Mr Spick aged 15, his twin brother and a friend were fishing from the Tinopai Wharf in the Kaipara Harbour. At about 2.00 p.m. that afternoon a young boy approached them and told them his friend, a 7 year old boy, had fallen off the wharf and was drowning as he didn't know how to swim. Mr Spick immediately jumped into the fast flowing out-going tide and managed to reach and hold on to the boy. Mr Spick didn't let go, despite swallowing large quantities of water and being dragged under several times. The two were washed some 300 metres downstream towards the Kaipara Heads and the Tasman Sea. Meanwhile, Mr Spick's twin brother and friend raced from the wharf to alert a fisherman they had seen earlier. The fisherman went to the aid of Mr Spick and the boy, successfully recovering them from the water in his boat.

- Duncan Taylor – of Feilding; detective constable, New Zealand Police. Posthumous award.

At about 1.00 p.m. on 5 July 2002 Detective Constable Duncan Taylor and Detective Jeanette Park went to Taipo Road, Rongotea to warn a local family that a person known to them may have returned to the area. While talking to the family they saw the person concerned drive past the house. The two officers followed his vehicle, which then stopped As the Police officers got out of their vehicle the person drove off and returned to the Taipo Road address followed by the Police vehicle Both vehicles stopped in the driveway of the Taipo Road house and as the two Police officers, who were unarmed, left their car, the male occupant of the other car presented a rifle at Detective Constable Taylor and, without warning, fired a single shot which killed him instantly.

- John Vaughan. Posthumous award

On 15 May 2002, a man entered the Māngere Bridge branch of the ASB Bank, wearing a disguise and carrying a loaded firearm in a bag. As he entered the bank he removed the firearm and approached the customer services representative, pointing the firearm at her and demanding entry into the teller area security alcove. Teller John Vaughan observed these actions from the secure alcove area and realising what was happening, allowed the offender entry as he was instructed to do during bank staff training, thus diverting the robber's attention from the other customer services representative. The offender entered the area and confronted Mr Vaughan and another teller, pointing the firearm at both of them and demanding that they fill his bag with money. As the tellers filled the bag, the offender told Mr Vaughan that he was going to shoot him in the head and then racked his firearm while pointing it at the tellers. The tellers continued loading the bag, then Mr Vaughan handed it to the offender. During this time, Mr Vaughan had attempted to take the lead and keep the other teller away from danger as much as possible. The two tellers then stood passively behind the counter with their arms raised in the surrender position. On his way out of the bank, the offender leaned forward over the counter and shot Mr Vaughan in the head. Mr Vaughan died within hours from the gun shot wound. The offender was subsequently convicted of the murder of Mr Vaughan.
