= List of post-nominal letters (New Zealand) =

Post-nominal letters following a person's name in New Zealand mainly denote military and civilian awards and decorations, and also memberships of scholarly and professional associations.

Only orders and decorations unique to New Zealand are listed, although a number of 'British' honours are still part of the New Zealand Honours System, notably those that are in the personal gift of the Sovereign, i.e., the Order of the Garter, Order of the Thistle, Royal Victorian Order, and the Order of Merit. In addition, many living New Zealanders hold appointments in the orders that the New Zealand Order of Merit replaced.

== List of post-nominal letters ==
| Office | Post-nominal |
|---|---|
Decorations for Bravery
| Recipient of the Victoria Cross (New Zealand version) | VC |
| Recipient of the New Zealand Cross (military or civilian) | NZC |
National Decorations
| Member of the Order of New Zealand | ONZ |
| Knight/Dame Grand Companion of the New Zealand Order of Merit | GNZM |
| Knight Companion of the New Zealand Order of Merit | KNZM |
| Dame Companion of the New Zealand Order of Merit | DNZM |
| Companion of the New Zealand Order of Merit | CNZM |
| Recipient of the New Zealand Gallantry Star | NZGS |
| Recipient of the New Zealand Bravery Star | NZBS |
| Companion of the Queen's Service Order | QSO |
| Officer of the New Zealand Order of Merit | ONZM |
| Member of the New Zealand Order of Merit | MNZM |
| Recipient of the New Zealand Gallantry Decoration | NZGD |
| Recipient of the New Zealand Bravery Decoration | NZBD |
| Recipient of the New Zealand Gallantry Medal | NZGM |
| Recipient of the New Zealand Bravery Medal | NZBM |
| Recipient of the Queen's Service Medal | QSM |
| Recipient of the New Zealand Antarctic Medal | NZAM |
| Recipient of the New Zealand Distinguished Service Decoration | DSD |
Justice of the Peace
| Justice of the Peace | JP |
| Judicial Justice of the Peace | JJP |
Fellowship or Membership of Professional Institutions or Learned Societies
Royal Society of New Zealand
| Fellow of the Royal Society of New Zealand | FRSNZ |
| Companion of the Royal Society of New Zealand | CRSNZ |
| Member of the Royal Society of New Zealand | MRSNZ |
Royal Numismatic Society of New Zealand
| Fellow of the Royal Numismatic Society of New Zealand | FRNSNZ |
Institute of IT Professionals
| Chartered IT Professional New Zealand | CITPNZ (or, optionally, just CITP instead) |
| Certified Technologist New Zealand | CTech |
| Full Member | MIITP |
| Fellow | FIITP |
| Honorary Fellow | HFIITP |
Security Professionals Registry Australasia
| Registered Security Professional | RSecP |
Australian and New Zealand Institute of Insurance and Finance
| Fellow of the Australian and New Zealand Institute of Insurance and Finance | ANZIIF (Fellow) CIP |
| Senior Associate of the Australian and New Zealand Institute of Insurance and Finance | ANZIIF (Snr Assoc) CIP |
| Associate of the Australian and New Zealand Institute of Insurance and Finance | ANZIIF (Assoc) CIP |
Royal New Zealand Institute of Horticulture
| Fellow of the Royal New Zealand Institute of Horticulture | FRIH |
Engineering New Zealand
| Student Member | No post nominal |
| Emerging Professional Member | No post nominal, but can use the symbol of membership |
| Member | MEngNZ |
| Chartered Member | CMEngNZ CMEngNZ (Eng. Technician) CMEngNZ (Eng. Technologist) CMEngNZ (PEngGeol) |
| Fellow | FEngNZ |
| Distinguished Fellow | DistFEngNZ |
New Zealand Law Society
| Member of the New Zealand Law Society | MNZLS |
| Associate Member of the New Zealand Law Society | Assoc.MNZLS |
New Zealand Planning Institute (NZPI)
| Full Member of New Zealand Planning Institute | MNZPI |
| Intermediate Member of New Zealand Planning Institute | Int.NZPI |
| Graduate Member of New Zealand Planning Institute | Grad.NZPI |
| Associate Member of New Zealand Planning Institute | Assoc.NZPI |
New Zealand Cinematographers Society (NZCS)
| Member of New Zealand Cinematographers Society | NZCS |
Designers Institute of New Zealand (DINZ)
| Member | DINZ |
| Professional Member | PDINZ |
| Fellow | FDINZ |
Library and Information Association of New Zealand Aotearoa (LIANZA)
| Member | no post nominal |
| Professionally registered | RLIANZA |
| Associate | ALIANZA |
New Zealand Specific Medical Colleges
| Fellow of the Royal New Zealand College of General Practitioners | FRNZCGP |
| Fellow of the Division of Rural Hospital Medicine of New Zealand | FDRHMNZ |
| Fellow of the Royal New Zealand College of Urgent Care (RNZCUC) | FRNZCUC |
| Fellow of the New Zealand College of Musculoskeletal Medicine | FNZCMM |
| Fellow of the New Zealand College of Public Health Medicine | FNZCPHM |
New Zealand Cadet Forces
| Officer of the New Zealand Cadet Forces | NZCF |

== See also ==
- List of post-nominal letters (Australia)
