= 2011 Special Honours (New Zealand) =

- Previous: 2011 bravery awards Next: 2011 gallantry awards
- Type: New Zealand royal honours: New Zealand Order of Merit; Queen's Service Order
- Date: 20 May 2011; 17 August 2011
- Country: New Zealand

Highlights
- Total recipients: 3

The 2011 Special Honours in New Zealand were two Special Honours Lists, published in New Zealand on 20 May and 17 August 2011. Appointments were made to the New Zealand Order of Merit and the Queen's Service Order to recognise the incoming governor-general, Jerry Mateparae, and the outgoing vice-regal consort, Susan, Lady Satyanand.

In addition, two other Special Honours Lists, published on 2 April and 1 October, promulgated the 2011 New Zealand bravery awards and the 2011 New Zealand gallantry awards.

== New Zealand Order of Merit ==
=== Knight Grand Companion (GNZM) ===
Additional

- Lieutenant General Jeremiah Mateparae ONZM – Governor-General Designate
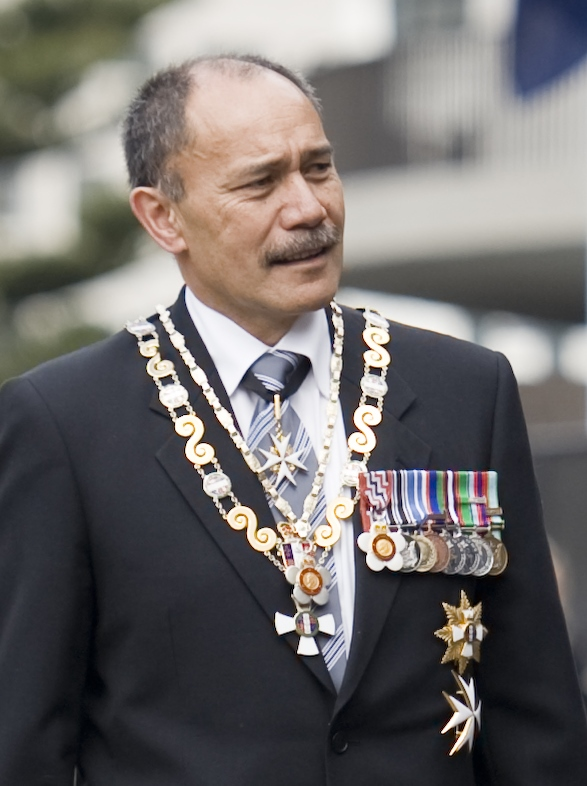
Sir Jerry Mateparae

== Companion of the Queen's Service Order (QSO) ==
Additional

- Lieutenant General Jeremiah Mateparae ONZM – Governor-General Designate
- Susan Jean, Lady Satyanand
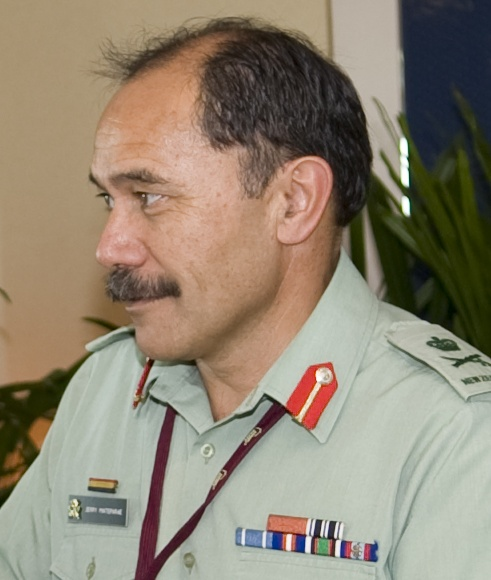
Sir Jerry Mateparae

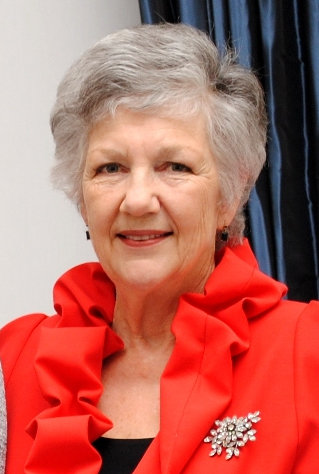
Susan, Lady Satyanand
