= New Zealand Gallantry Medal =

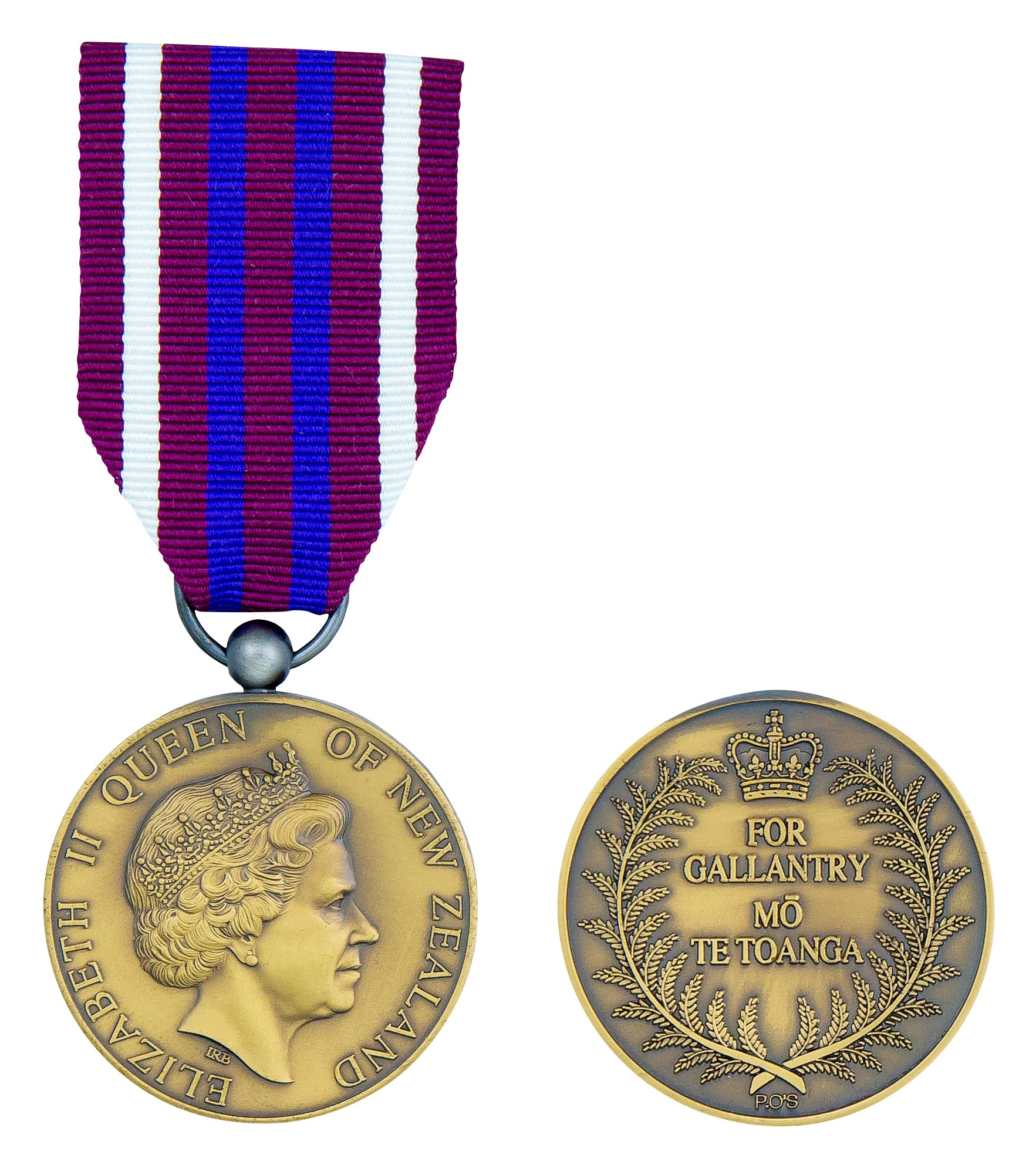
- Obverse and reverse of the medal.
- Type: Military decoration.
- Awarded for: "acts of gallantry" while involved in war and warlike operational service (including peacekeeping).
- Description: Bronze disk, 38mm diameter.
- Presented by: New Zealand
- Eligibility: New Zealand and allied forces.
- Status: Currently awarded.
- Established: 20 September 1999
- First award: 2005 New Year Honours
- Final award: 3 December 2015
- Founder: Elizabeth II

Highlights
- Total: 12
- Ribbon: 32mm, crimson with two central purple stripes and two outer white stripes

Precedence
- Next (higher): Order of Saint John
- Next (lower): New Zealand Bravery Medal

The New Zealand Gallantry Medal (NZGM) is the fourth level military decoration of the New Zealand armed forces.

It was instituted by Royal Warrant on 20 September 1999 as part of the new indigenous New Zealand Gallantry system. The medal, which may be awarded posthumously, is granted in recognition of 'acts of gallantry' while involved in war and warlike operational service (including peacekeeping).

Bars are awarded to the NZGM in recognition of the performance of further acts of gallantry meriting the award. Recipients are entitled to the postnominal letters "N.Z.G.M.".

This medal replaced the award of the Mention in Despatches, the Queen's Commendation for Brave Conduct, and Queen's Commendation for Valuable Service in the Air.

== Recipients ==
Name	Rank	Unit	Campaign	Date of action
Gerald Stewart Fenton	Corporal	Royal New Zealand Infantry Regiment	United Nations Mission in East Timor	10 August 2000
R	Corporal	New Zealand Special Air Service	War in Afghanistan	2004
Denis Joachim Wanihi	Warrant officer class two	Royal New Zealand Army Logistic Regiment	War in Afghanistan	28 August 2010, 19 September 2010
Dean Maurice Rennie	Acting Warrant officer class two	Royal New Zealand Army Logistic Regiment	War in Afghanistan	October 2010-April 2011
A	Undisclosed	New Zealand Special Air Service	War in Afghanistan	2011
C	Undisclosed	New Zealand Special Air Service	War in Afghanistan	2011
D	Undisclosed	New Zealand Special Air Service	War in Afghanistan	2011
J	Undisclosed	New Zealand Special Air Service	War in Afghanistan	2011
S	Undisclosed	New Zealand Special Air Service	War in Afghanistan	2011
Benjamin Mark Pryor	Flight lieutenant	Royal New Zealand Air Force	War in Afghanistan	April-May 2012
John Frank Manila Luamanu	Lance corporal	Corps of Royal New Zealand Engineers	War in Afghanistan	4 August 2012
Rory Patrick Malone	Lance corporal	Royal New Zealand Infantry Regiment	War in Afghanistan	4 August 2012

== See also ==
- Orders, decorations, and medals of New Zealand
- New Zealand gallantry awards
- New Zealand bravery awards
- New Zealand campaign medals
