= 2022 New Zealand bravery awards =

2022 bravery awards
- Previous: 2022 Special Honours; Next: 2023 New Year Honours
- Type: New Zealand royal honours: New Zealand Bravery Star; New Zealand Bravery Decoration; New Zealand Bravery Medal
- Date: 26 October 2022
- Country: New Zealand

Highlights
- Total recipients: 8

The 2022 New Zealand bravery awards were announced via a Special Honours List on 26 October 2022. The awards recognised the bravery of seven helicopter pilots during the Whakaari / White Island eruption on 9 December 2019, and one New Zealand Defence Force soldier during a live grenade practice in June 2020.

== New Zealand Bravery Star (NZBS) ==
The New Zealand Bravery Star was awarded for an act of outstanding bravery in a situation of danger:

- Robert Mark Law – of Whakatāne.
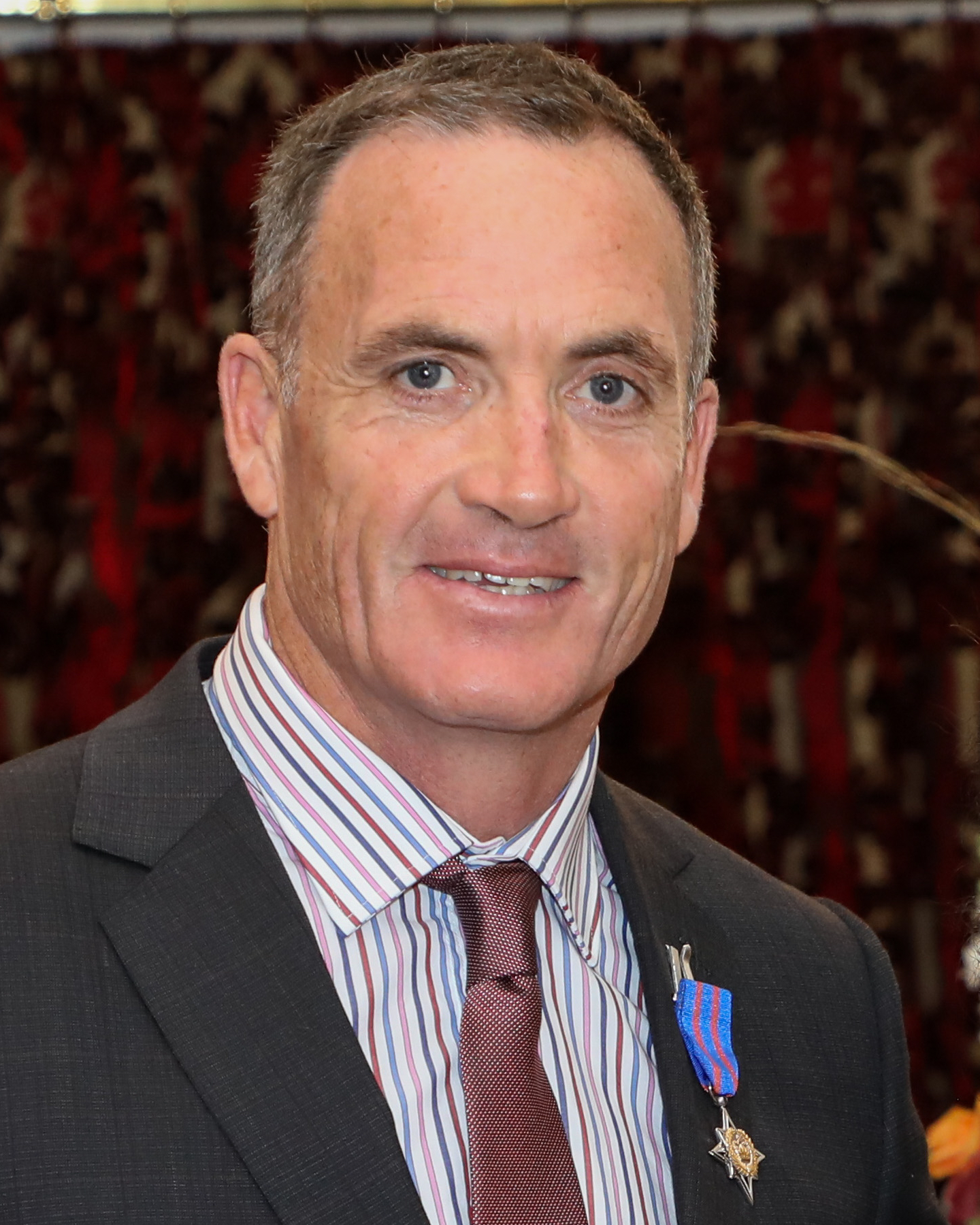
Mark Law

== New Zealand Bravery Decoration (NZBD) ==
The New Zealand Bravery Decoration was awarded for an act of exceptional bravery in a situation of danger:

- Timothy Robin Barrow – of Rotorua.
- Jason William Hill – of Ōpōtiki.
- Graeme Hopcroft – of Tauranga.
- Sam Peter Jones – of Tauranga.
- Callum Mill – of Rotorua.
- Thomas Sandford Storey – of Ōpōtiki.
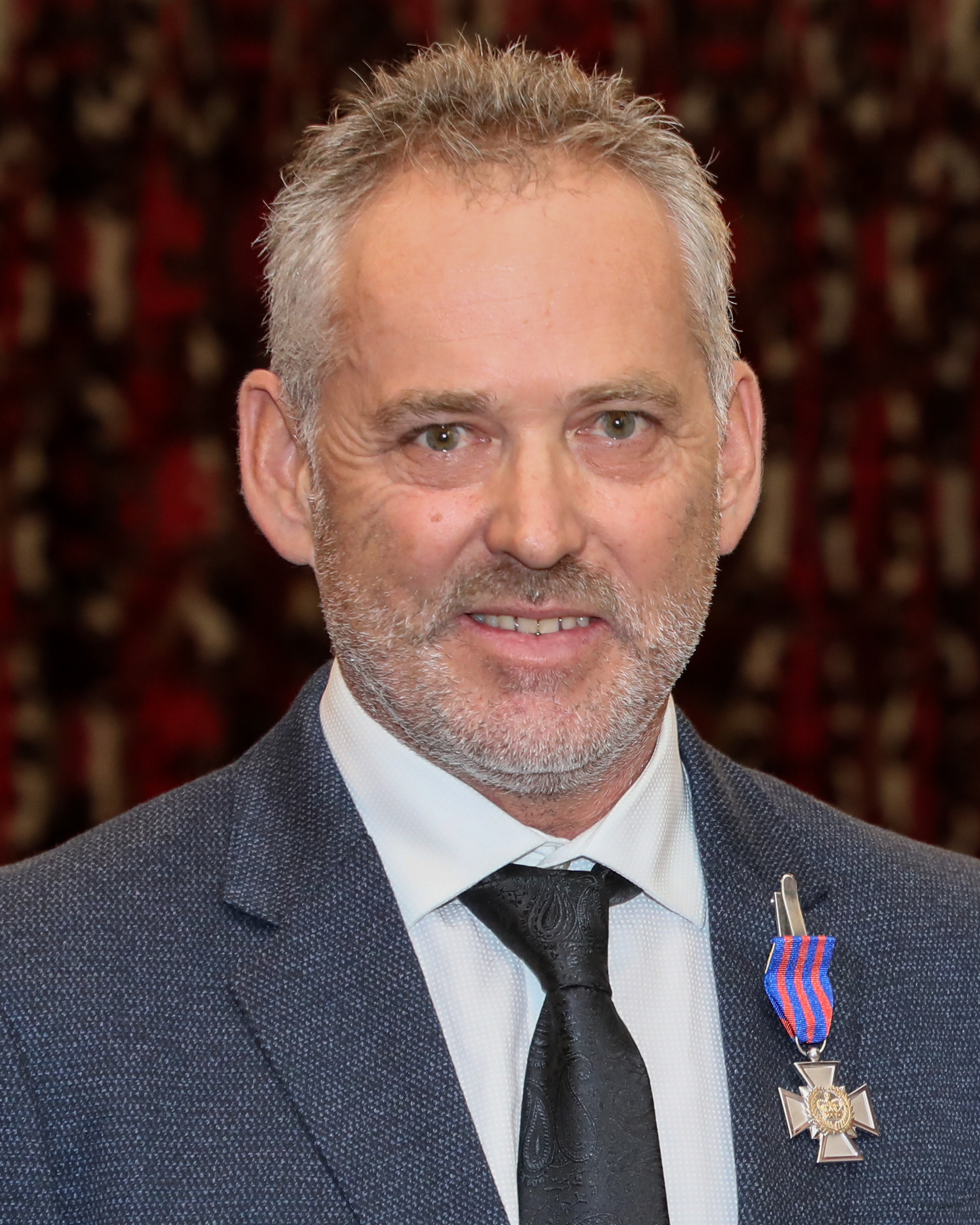
Tim Barrow

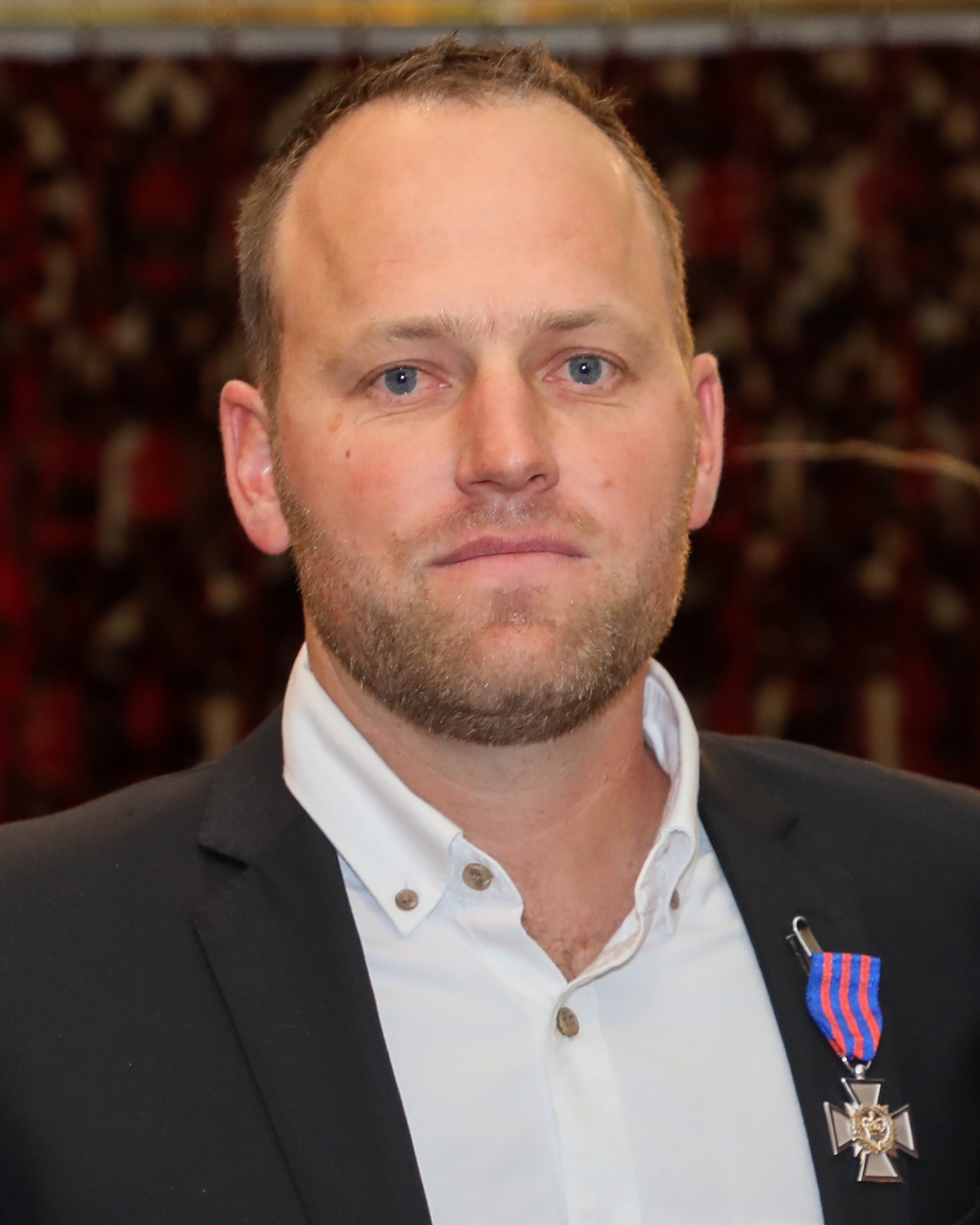
Jason Hill

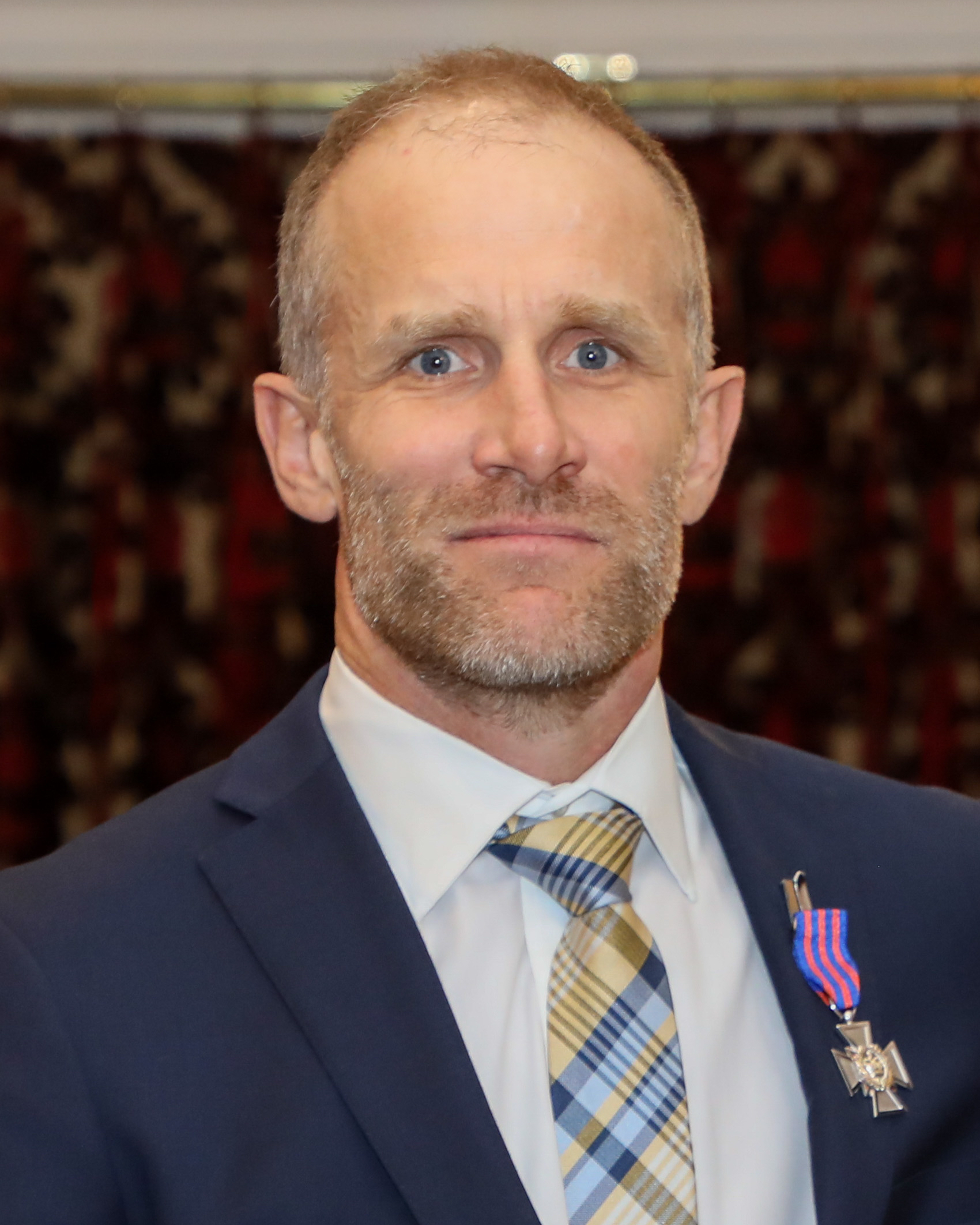
Graeme Hopcroft

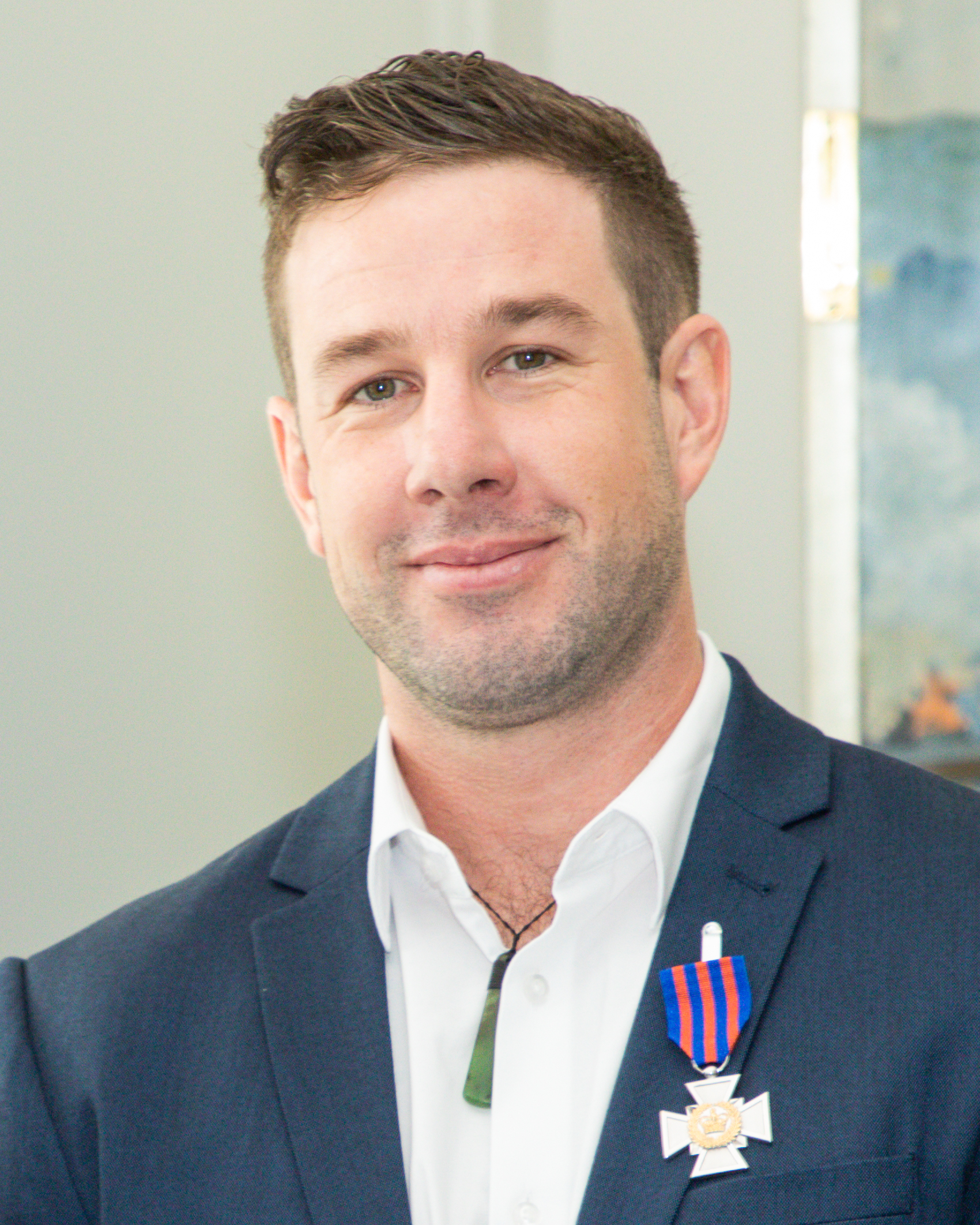
Sam Jones

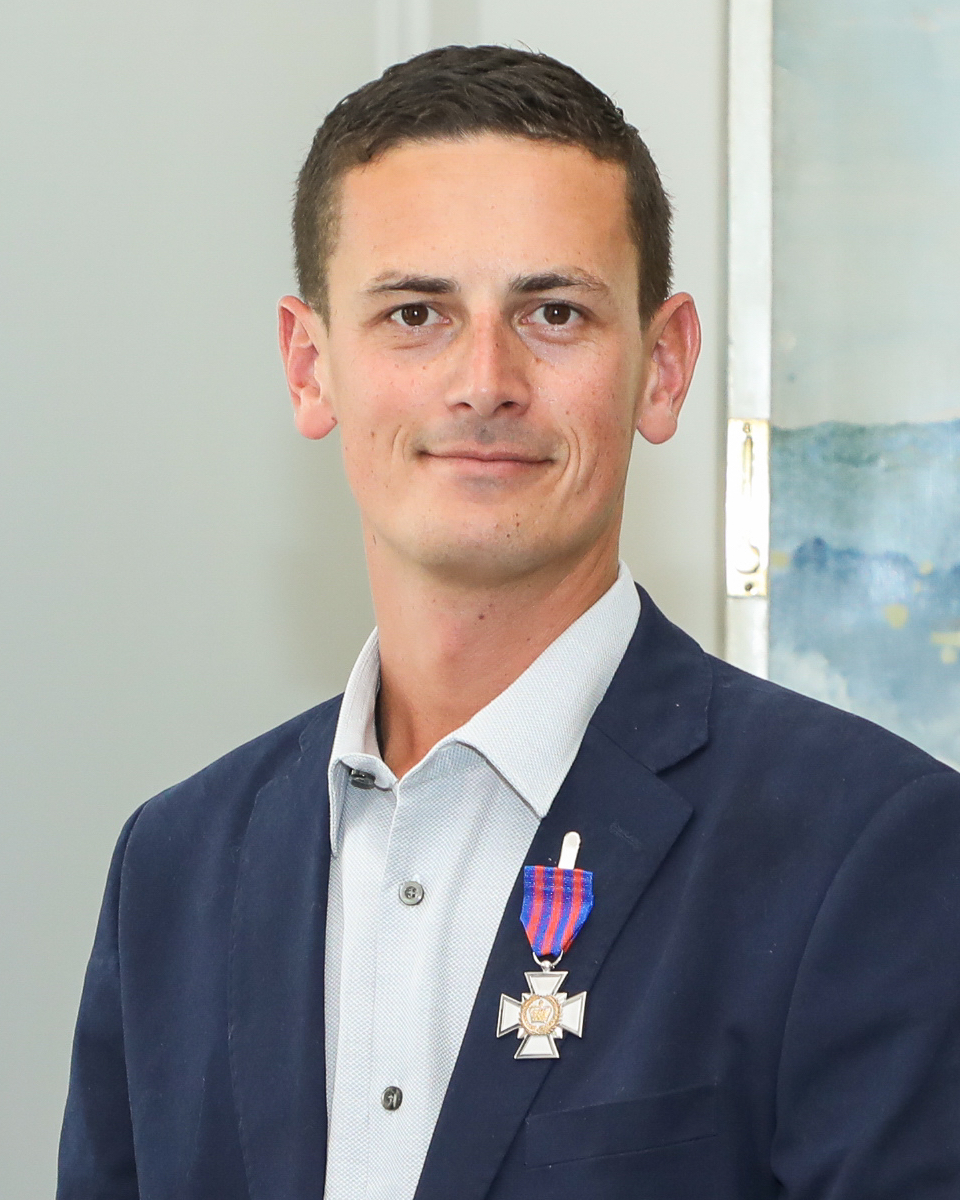
Callum Mill

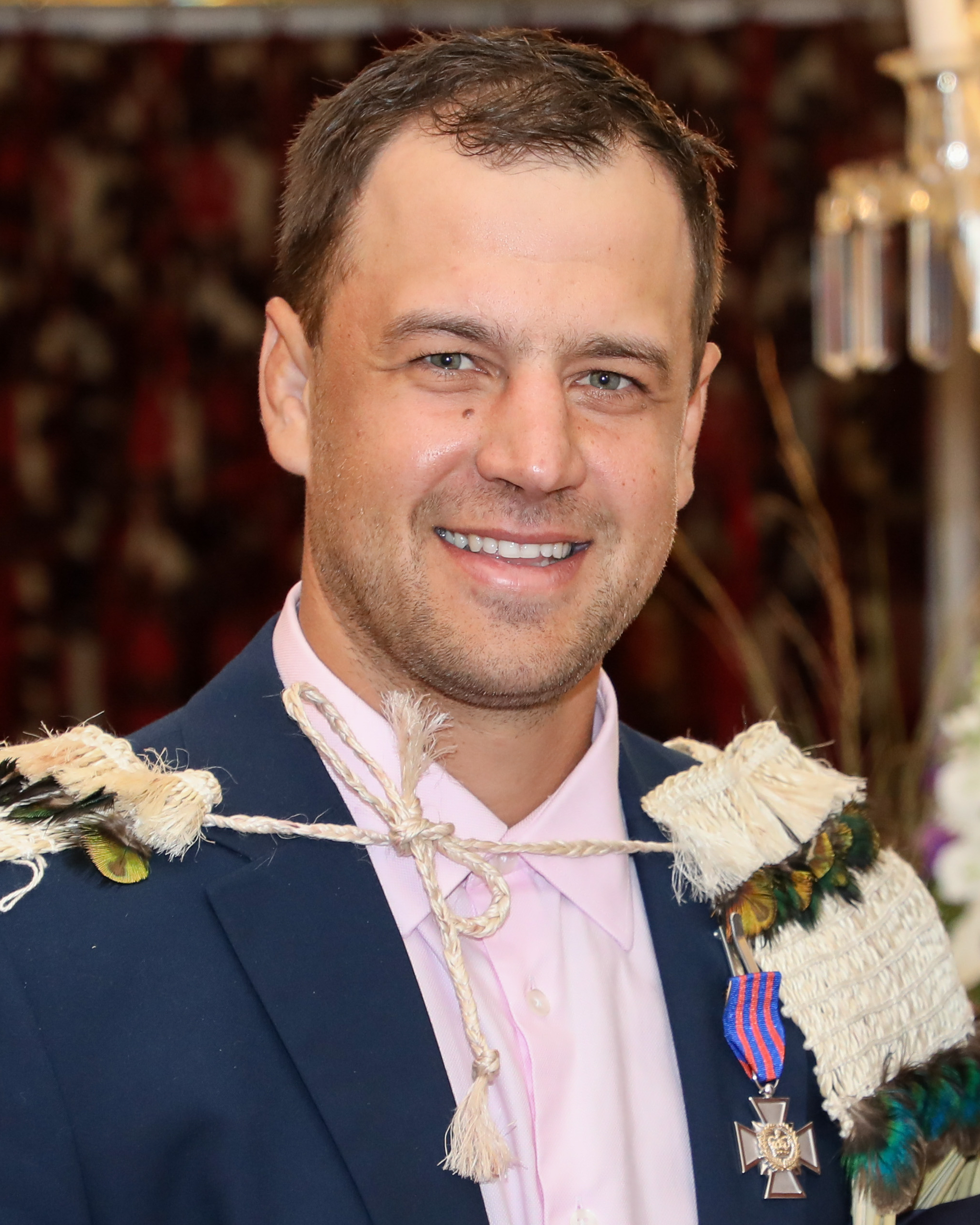
Tom Storey

== New Zealand Bravery Medal (NZBM) ==
The New Zealand Bravery Medal was awarded for an act of bravery:

- Acting Warrant Officer Class 2 Michael Anthony Marvin – of Pahiatua.
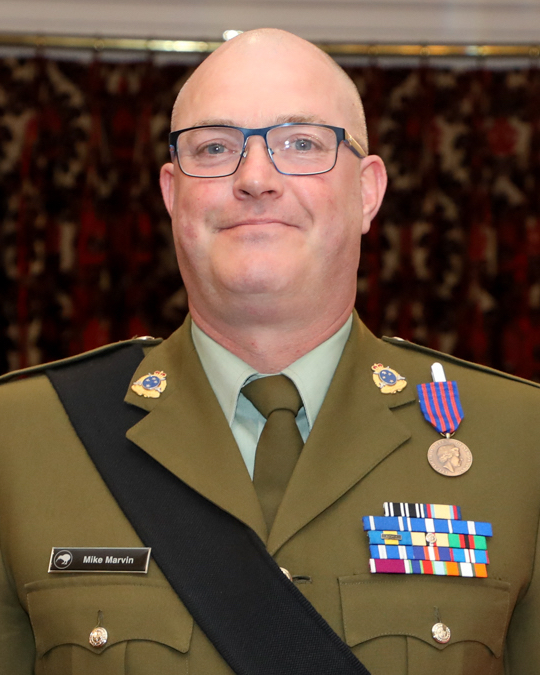
Mike Marvin
