= New Zealand Bravery Star =

New Zealand bravery award

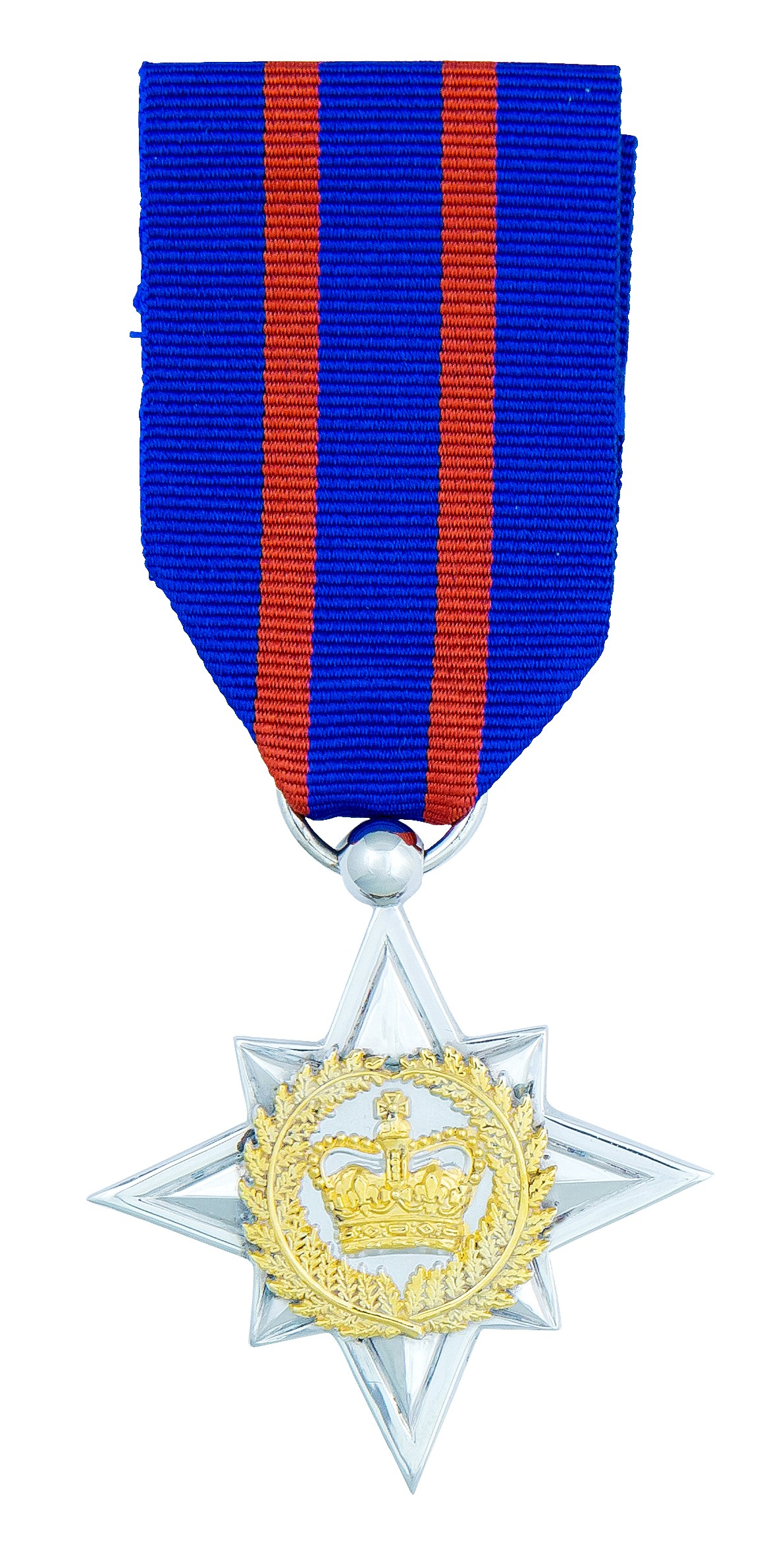
- Obverse of the medal
- Type: Civil decoration
- Awarded for: "acts of outstanding bravery in situations of danger"
- Description: 45 mm, (obverse) faceted silver eight-pointed star with four long and four short points surmounted by the Royal Crown and fern frond wreath emblem; (reverse) inscribed "FOR BRAVERY - MO TE MAIA". With ring suspension.
- Presented by: New Zealand
- Eligibility: Those performing acts of bravery in, or meriting recognition by, New Zealand
- Status: Currently awarded
- Established: 20 September 1999
- First award: 23 October 1999
- Latest award: 6 December 2024

Highlights
- Total: 21
- Ribbon of the New Zealand Bravery Star

Precedence
- Next (higher): New Zealand Gallantry Star
- Next (lower): Companion of the King's Service Order

The New Zealand Bravery Star (NZBS) is the second-level civil decoration of New Zealand.

It was instituted by Royal Warrant on 20 September 1999 as part of the move to replace British bravery awards with an indigenous New Zealand Bravery system. The medal, which may be awarded posthumously, is granted in recognition of "acts of outstanding bravery in situations of danger". The medal is primarily a civilian award, but it is also awarded to members of the armed forces who perform acts of bravery in non-operational circumstances (given that the New Zealand gallantry awards may only be awarded "while involved in war and warlike operational service (including peacekeeping)".

Bars are awarded to the NZBS in recognition of the performance of further acts of bravery meriting the award. Recipients are entitled to the postnominal letters NZBS.

The medal replaced the award of the George Medal in respect of acts of bravery in, or meriting recognition by, New Zealand.

== Recipients ==
- This along with a * indicates that the New Zealand Bravery Star was awarded posthumously.

Name	Date of action	Location of action	Date of award
Robert Edwin Hall MBE	10 May 1996*	Mount Everest	23 October 1999
Andrew Michael Harris	10 May 1996*	Mount Everest	23 October 1999
Walter Bruce Butler	7 December 1998	Napier	23 October 1999
Constable Damian Peter John Klavs	16 June 1999	Wellington	29 January 2005
John Bell Fenton Penetana	10 December 1999	Rawene	29 January 2005
Trevor Francis Mokaraka	10 December 1999*	Rawene	29 January 2005
Peter James Deam	9 April 2000	Waihao River	29 January 2005
Detective Jeanette Ruth Park	5 July 2002	Rongotea	29 January 2005
Taufui Aevalu Paea	6 December 2004	Auckland	3 May 2008
Antony McClean	15 April 2008*	Mangatepopo Gorge	2 April 2011
Anthony Walter Mulder	15 April 2008*	Mangatepopo Gorge	2 April 2011
Austin Bernard Hemmings	25 September 2008*	Auckland	2 April 2011
Constable Michael John Burne	7 May 2009	Napier	2 April 2011
Leonard Rex Holmwood	7 May 2009	Napier	2 April 2011
Senior Constable Dennis Michael Hurworth	7 May 2009	Napier	2 April 2011
Detective Sergeant Timothy Nigel Smith	7 May 2009	Napier	2 April 2011
Senior Constable Paul Anthony Symonds	7 May 2009	Napier	2 April 2011
Mark Robert Law	9 December 2019	Whakaari / White Island	26 October 2022
Hussein Al-Umari	15 March 2019*	Christchurch	6 December 2024
Jorge Roberto Fuenzalida	10 May 2021	Dunedin	6 December 2024
Dallas Kerry Wilson	10 May 2021	Dunedin	6 December 2024

== See also ==
- Orders, decorations, and medals of New Zealand
- New Zealand gallantry awards
- New Zealand bravery awards
- New Zealand campaign medals
