= New Zealand Cross (1999) =

Civil decoration of New Zealand for acts of bravery

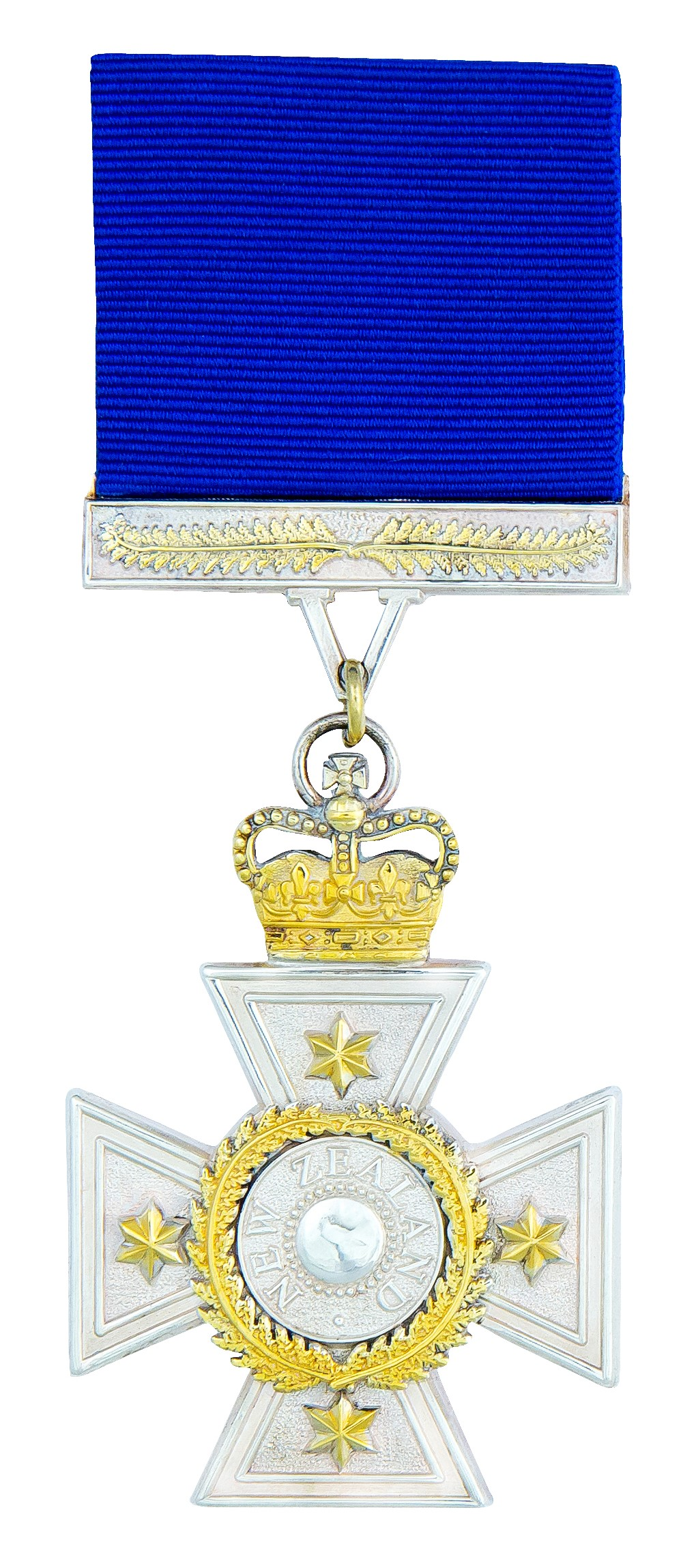
- Obverse of the Cross
- Type: Civil decoration
- Awarded for: "... acts of great bravery in situations of extreme danger"
- Presented by: New Zealand
- Eligibility: New Zealand civilians, but may also be awarded to New Zealand military personnel in some circumstances
- Status: Currently awarded
- Established: 20 September 1999
- First award: 23 October 1999
- Final award: 16 December 2021

Highlights
- Total: 4
- Total awarded posthumously: 2
- Ribbon: 38mm, bright blue

Precedence
- Equivalent: Victoria Cross for New Zealand
- Next (lower): New Zealand Bravery Star

The New Zealand Cross (NZC) is New Zealand's highest award for bravery not in the face of the enemy. It was instituted by Royal Warrant on 20 September 1999 as part of the move to replace British bravery awards with a distinct New Zealand bravery system. The medal, which may be awarded posthumously, is granted in recognition of "acts of great bravery in situations of extreme danger". The medal is primarily a civilian award, but it is also awarded to members of the armed forces who perform acts of bravery in non-operational circumstances (given that the New Zealand gallantry awards may only be awarded "while involved in war and warlike operational service (including peacekeeping)".

Bars are awarded to the NZC in recognition of the performance of further acts of bravery meriting the award. Recipients are entitled to the postnominal letters "NZC". This medal replaced the award of the George Cross in respect of acts of bravery in, or meriting recognition by, New Zealand. The design of this medal was based on the original New Zealand Cross (1869), though with a change of ribbon colour to differentiate it from the Victoria Cross.

== Appearance ==
The New Zealand Cross is similar in design to the original New Zealand Cross (1869). The decoration is a silver cross pattée, 52 millimetres high, 38 millimetres wide, with six-pointed gold star on each limb. In the centre there are the words 'New Zealand' within a gold fern wreath. The cross surmounted by a gold Saint Edward's Crown which is attached by a ring and a seriffed 'V' to a bar ornamented with gold fern leaves, through which the ribbon passes. On the reverse "FOR BRAVERY – MO TE MAIA" is inscribed.

== Recipients ==
Jacinda Margaret Amey

On 24 April 1992 Ms Amey was one of five members of a Meteorological Service team, stationed on the remote sub-Antarctic Campbell Island, who were snorkelling when one of them, Mr Mike Fraser, was attacked by a shark, believed to be a white pointer. The other swimmers, apart from Ms Amey, swam to shore. Ms Amey waited until the shark moved away from Mr Fraser and then went to his aid and towed him to shore. Mr Fraser had lost his right forearm and his left forearm was severely lacerated and appeared to be broken. He was having trouble breathing and required urgent medical treatment. Having got him to shore, Ms Amey then joined the rest of the team in doing what they could for Mr Fraser until he could be flown to New Zealand. Ms Amey displayed great courage and bravery with complete disregard for her own safety in going to Mr Fraser's assistance.

Reginald John Dixon Posthumous award

On 9 June 1995, Mr Dixon, aged 47, and his wife were passengers on Ansett New Zealand Flight 703 when the aircraft crashed in the Tararua Ranges near Palmerston North. Mr Dixon escaped from the wreckage with fractures. However, despite his injuries, he returned to the aircraft to help other passengers trapped in the wreckage. As a result of this selfless action, he was critically burned when a flash fire broke out on the left wing of the aircraft near a hole in the fuselage from which he was helping passengers escape. He was hospitalised and underwent surgery and skin grafts. Mr Dixon remained in a coma, and although he made some initial improvement, his condition worsened and he died two weeks later, the fourth victim of the crash. The situation in which Mr Dixon found himself was extremely dangerous and he displayed great bravery in returning to the aircraft, although injured, to help other passengers which subsequently resulted in the loss of his own life. His bravery undoubtedly ensured that the loss of life was not greater.

Naeem Rashid Posthumous award

On Friday 15 March 2019, Dr Naeem Rashid and his son arrived to attend afternoon prayer at the Al Noor Mosque on Deans Avenue in Christchurch. They entered the main prayer room just before 1.30pm and remained there while the Imam began speaking to the congregation. Shortly before 1.40pm, a lone gunman armed with semi-automatic shotguns and assault rifles, with several hundred rounds of ammunition, commenced an attack on the Al Noor Mosque. The gunman entered the Mosque, and made his way to the main prayer room, shooting people in the main entranceway and along the corridor. The congregation attempted to flee from the gunman as he came down the corridor and into the main prayer room. Most of the congregation fled to the sides of the prayer room. Several people directly in line of the corridor were shot. Dr Rashid, who had been sitting on the floor of the main prayer room, got up and ran to the side of the room where a large number of the congregation were trying to escape through a small window and door. Survivor Tarik Chenafa had broken the lower pane of the window, and several people were able to escape, but others could not, as the gunman was firing at them. This caused a bottleneck to develop, and many people were exposed to the gunman's line of fire. Dr Rashid was at the back of this group. He saw the gunman begin firing shots into a large group of men on the other side of the room. Dr Rashid launched himself from his position and ran at the gunman. When Dr Rashid was approximately one metre from him, the gunman swung the rifle around and shot Dr Rashid in the shoulder. Dr Rashid collided with the gunman, grabbing him and knocking him to the ground. The impact dislodged one of the ammunition magazines from the gunman’s tactical vest. As the gunman fell, he turned the rifle and again fired at Dr Rashid, who was now lying on the floor. The gunman regained his feet and shot the wounded Dr Rashid, killing him, before continuing to shoot others in the main prayer room. Because of Dr Rashid’s actions, the gunman’s attention was temporarily diverted from the people trying to escape on the other side of the room. During that time, at least seven people were able to escape through the broken window. In a situation of extreme danger, Dr Rashid displayed great courage and bravery in challenging the gunman, with complete disregard for his own safety. In so doing, he selflessly enabled others to escape, at the cost of his own life. Without Dr Rashid’s brave actions, the loss of life on 15 March 2019 would have been even greater.

Rashid was also honoured by Pakistan awarding him the Nishan-e-Shujaat medal – the highest gallantry award a Pakistani civilian can receive.

Abdul Aziz Wahabzadah (Abdul Aziz)

On Friday 15 March 2019, Mr Abdul Aziz was attending Friday afternoon prayers at the Linwood Islamic Centre on Linwood Avenue in Christchurch, along with his four sons aged between six and 19 years. Shortly before 1.50pm, a lone gunman dressed in full camouflage gear and armed with semi-automatic shotguns and assault rifles, with several hundred rounds of ammunition, commenced an attack on the Linwood Mosque. Mr Aziz became aware of multiple gunshots being fired outside. At the same time a worshipper in the front row of the prayer then said someone had been shot through the window from the driveway and some worshippers attempted to leave the Mosque. Mr Aziz went to the door of the Mosque to investigate and saw the gunman in his camouflage clothing running back to his car, which had been parked in Linwood Avenue blocking the driveway to the Mosque to prevent any vehicle entering or exiting the property. The gunman discarded a rifle in the driveway and retrieved a loaded semi-automatic rifle from his vehicle. Mr Aziz left the Mosque without hesitation with the intention of chasing the gunman away. He yelled at the gunman and to defend himself he grabbed an EFTPOS machine from near the entrance of the Mosque. He ran after the gunman and threw the EFTPOS machine in his direction. When Mr Aziz was around 15 metres away, the gunman fired at least three shots at him with the semi-automatic rifle. Mr Aziz ducked down between parked cars and made his way through the vehicles towards the rear of the Mosque. On his way to the rear of the Mosque, Mr Aziz noticed bodies of worshippers on the ground and the discarded lever action rifle, which made him realise the gunman had a new firearm. He checked to see if the lever action rifle was loaded but it was not. Hearing more shots from inside the Mosque, Mr Aziz took the empty discarded rifle and made his way towards the front of the Mosque, yelling to get the gunman’s attention. Mr Aziz shouted provocations at the gunman to get him to refocus his attention on Mr Aziz, with the intention of preventing further loss of life. The gunman saw Mr Aziz carrying the discarded rifle, dropped his gun and ran to his car. Mr Aziz chased after him and, while the gunman was sitting in his car, threw the gunman’s discarded rifle at the back left window of the car, smashing it. The gunman drove off, with Mr Aziz continuing to chase him for a time down Linwood Avenue. The situation in which Mr Aziz found himself was extremely dangerous. In challenging the gunman he displayed great courage and bravery, and complete disregard for his own safety. Mr Aziz’s brave actions deterred the gunman from re-entering this Mosque to kill and maim others and ultimately forced the gunman to flee the Mosque.

== See also ==
- Orders, decorations, and medals of New Zealand
- New Zealand gallantry awards
- New Zealand bravery awards
- New Zealand campaign medals
- List of George Cross recipients
