= New Zealand Cross =

The New Zealand Cross may refer to one of two medals, both issued by the government of New Zealand:

- New Zealand Cross (1869), first New Zealand Cross instituted in 1869 to recognise gallantry during the New Zealand Wars of 1860 to 1872 – provided recognition to members of the local volunteer forces who were not eligible for the Victoria Cross
- New Zealand Cross (1999), second New Zealand medal of similar design to the above and instituted in 1999 as the premier civilian award for bravery
