= New Zealand Distinguished Service Decoration =

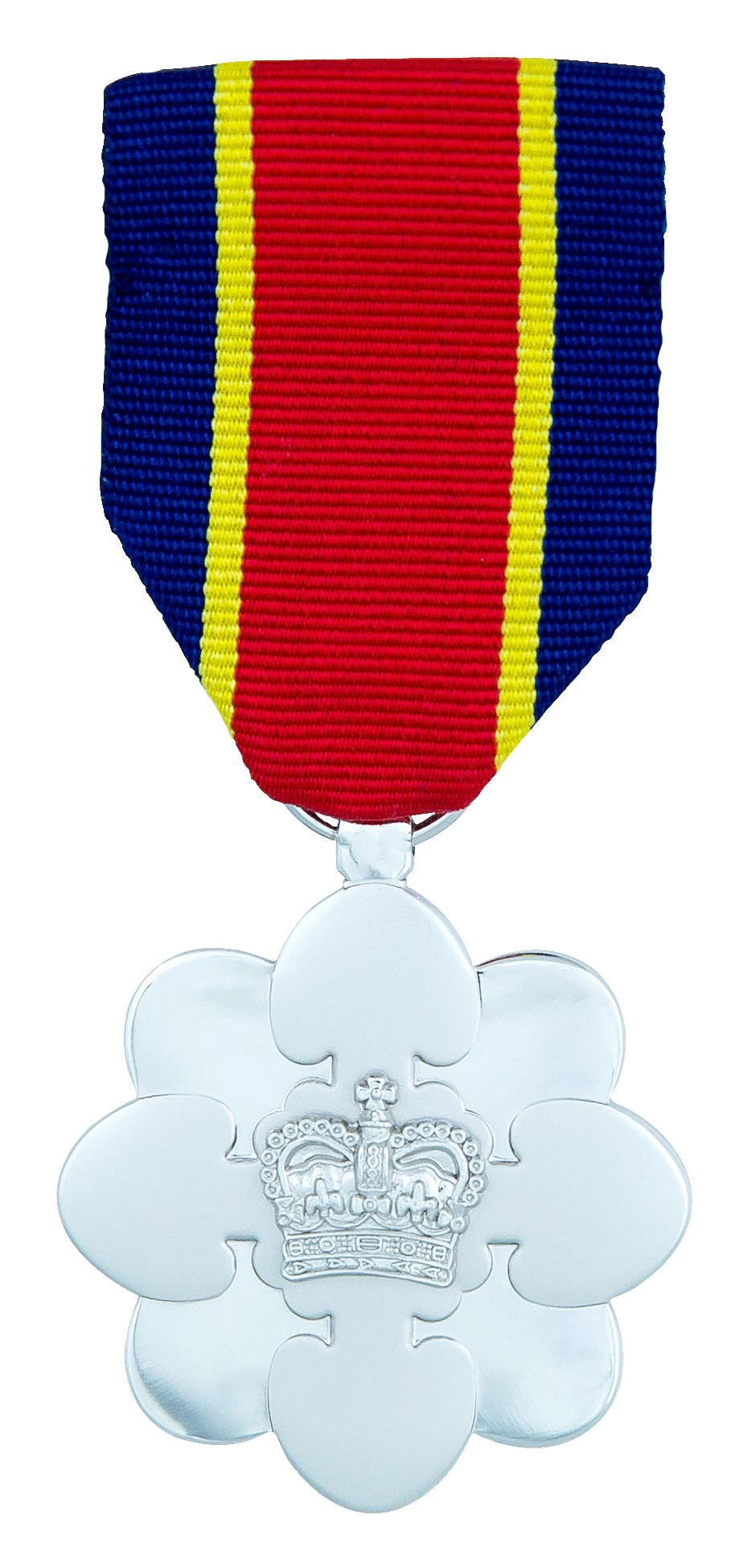
- Obverse of the decoration
- Type: Medal for Meritorious Service
- Awarded for: Distinguished military service, by regular, territorial and reserve members of the New Zealand Defence Force
- Presented by: New Zealand
- Eligibility: all members of the New Zealand Defence Force, or uniformed members of allied forces serving with the New Zealand Defence Force
- Post-nominals: DSD
- Status: Currently awarded
- Established: 14 May 2007
- First award: 4 June 2007
- Latest award: 1 June 2026

Highlights
- Total: 136
- Ribbon of the medal

Precedence
- Next (higher): New Zealand Antarctic Medal
- Next (lower): British Empire Medal

The New Zealand Distinguished Service Decoration (DSD) was instituted by Royal Warrant as a New Zealand Royal Honour in 2007 to recognise distinguished military service, by regular, territorial and reserve members of the New Zealand Defence Force. Until 1995, this type of service was recognised by awards of the British Empire Medal (Military Division). After the change to a totally New Zealand Honours system in 1996, these Commonwealth awards were not available to be awarded to New Zealand military personnel.

== Eligibility ==
All members of the New Zealand Defence Force, or uniformed members of allied forces operating with or alongside units of the New Zealand military are eligible for the decoration. It may be awarded for the outstanding performance of military duties in either warlike or non-warlike operations, or for individual efforts toward peacetime and humanitarian service which brings great credit to the New Zealand Defence Force. The acts must contribute significantly, through exceptional devotion to duty, dedication, judgement or application of skills to the conduct of an operational deployment, the conduct of military training or a military operation or operations, or the management and implementation of a project or activity with significant implications for the current or future capability of the New Zealand Defence Force. The Distinguished Service Decoration also may be awarded for a single accomplishment or instance of extraordinary performance of duty, or can be awarded for cumulative efforts over a long period of time.

== Appearance ==
The decoration, made of sterling silver, is a representation of a kotiate, a Māori eight bladed war club. In the centre of the kotiate is St Edward’s Crown. The blades alternate between frosted and polished silver. The reverse is inscribed “FOR DISTINGUISHED SERVICE” and its Māori language equivalent “MO NGA TE MAHI KAHURANGI”. The ribbon is dark blue with a center stripe of red, two narrow yellow stripes separate the red stripe from the blue.

== Recipients ==
Name	Rank	Unit	Honours list
Jonathon Aaron Ishmael Fatu	Private	Royal New Zealand Infantry Regiment	2007 Queen's Birthday Honours
Shane Andrew Meighan	Squadron Leader	Royal New Zealand Air Force	2007 Queen's Birthday Honours
Robert James Mills VRD	Lieutenant Commander	Royal New Zealand Naval Volunteer Reserve	2007 Queen's Birthday Honours
Barry John Nelson	Wing Commander	Royal New Zealand Air Force	2007 Queen's Birthday Honours
Brett James Rankin	Lieutenant Colonel	Royal Regiment of New Zealand Artillery	2007 Queen's Birthday Honours
James Patrick Rankin	Squadron Leader	Royal New Zealand Air Force	2007 Queen's Birthday Honours
Darren Kavan Te Whata	Corporal	Royal New Zealand Army Logistic Regiment	2007 Queen's Birthday Honours
William Peter Watters	Corporal	Royal New Zealand Infantry Regiment	2007 Queen's Birthday Honours
Michael Edward Yardley	Group Captain	Royal New Zealand Air Force	2007 Queen's Birthday Honours
David Anthony Bamfield ONZM	Air Vice-Marshal	Royal New Zealand Air Force	2008 New Year Honours
Brenton Lee Beach	Staff Sergeant	Royal New Zealand Infantry Regiment	2008 New Year Honours
David Murray Chisnall	Warrant Officer	Royal New Zealand Navy	2008 New Year Honours
Richard Lance Cook	Commander	Royal New Zealand Navy	2008 New Year Honours
John William Lovatt	Wing Commander	Royal New Zealand Air Force	2008 New Year Honours
Mark John Richard Mortiboy	Warrant Officer Class One	Royal New Zealand Army Logistic Regiment	2008 New Year Honours
Sean Anthony Ngatai	Corporal	Royal New Zealand Army Logistic Regiment	2008 New Year Honours
Timothy Andrew O'Donnell	Lieutenant	Royal New Zealand Infantry Regiment	2008 New Year Honours
Terence Albert Joseph O'Neill	Major	Royal New Zealand Infantry Regiment	2008 New Year Honours
Kevin Andrew Yorwarth	Warrant Officer Class One	Royal New Zealand Army Logistic Regiment	2008 New Year Honours
Gregory John Burroughs	Squadron Leader	Royal New Zealand Air Force	2008 Queen's Birthday Honours
Helen Joy Cooper	Lieutenant Colonel	Royal New Zealand Army Logistic Regiment	2008 Queen's Birthday Honours
Michael Peter De Boer	Captain	Corps of Royal New Zealand Engineers	2008 Queen's Birthday Honours
Timothy Richard Evans	Squadron Leader	Royal New Zealand Air Force	2008 Queen's Birthday Honours
Timothy Hopkins	Squadron Leader	Royal New Zealand Air Force	2008 Queen's Birthday Honours
Robert David Joseph Martelletti	Warrant Officer	Royal New Zealand Air Force	2008 Queen's Birthday Honours
Wayne Robert Morris	Warrant Officer	Royal New Zealand Navy	2008 Queen's Birthday Honours
Christopher Gerard Mortiboy	Major	Royal New Zealand Corps of Signals	2008 Queen's Birthday Honours
Phillip John Manning	Gunner	Royal Regiment of New Zealand Artillery	2009 New Year Honours
Neil Andrew Roberts	Warrant Officer	Royal New Zealand Navy	2009 New Year Honours
George Sean Trengrove MVO	Colonel	Colonel's List, New Zealand Army (Territorial Force)	2009 New Year Honours
John Francis Weel	Warrant Officer Class Two	Royal Regiment of New Zealand Artillery	2009 New Year Honours
Thomas Michael Allen MNZM	Warrant Officer	Royal New Zealand Navy	2009 Queen's Birthday Honours
Robert William Gillies	Major	Royal New Zealand Army Logistic Regiment	2009 Queen's Birthday Honours
Shirley Anne Patton	Acting Warrant Officer Master-at-arms	Royal New Zealand Navy	2009 Queen's Birthday Honours
Simon John Caulfield Strombom	Major	Royal New Zealand Armoured Corps (Territorial Force)	2009 Queen's Birthday Honours
Dougal Andrew Barker	Major	Royal New Zealand Armoured Corps	2010 New Year Honours
Mark Stanley Brunton	Wing Commander	Royal New Zealand Air Force	2010 New Year Honours
Bryce Cameron Gurney	Major	Corps of Royal New Zealand Engineers	2010 New Year Honours
Peter Wayne Jacobs	Major	Royal New Zealand Army Medical Corps	2010 New Year Honours
Mary Elizabeth Cox	Group Captain	Royal New Zealand Air Force	2010 Queen's Birthday Honours
Jason Stewart Haggitt	Commander	Royal New Zealand Navy	2010 Queen's Birthday Honours
Blake William Herbert ED JP	Lieutenant	Royal New Zealand Infantry Regiment (Territorial Force)	2010 Queen's Birthday Honours
Michael William Koberstein	Lieutenant	New Zealand Intelligence Corps	2010 Queen's Birthday Honours
Simon Montague Marriott	Major	Royal New Zealand Armoured Corps (Territorial Force)	2010 Queen's Birthday Honours
Andrew Gavin McMillan	Commander	Royal New Zealand Navy	2010 Queen's Birthday Honours
Matthew William Pearce	Corporal	Royal New Zealand Infantry Regiment	2010 Queen's Birthday Honours
Brendon Pett	Wing Commander	Royal New Zealand Air Force	2010 Queen's Birthday Honours
Brendan Patrick Wood	Major	Royal New Zealand Army Medical Corps	2010 Queen's Birthday Honours
Suzanne Lynn Koia	Captain	Royal New Zealand Nursing Corps	2011 New Year Honours
Wiremu Beamish Simon Moffitt	Warrant Officer Class Two		2011 New Year Honours
Donald Napier	Warrant Officer	Royal New Zealand Air Force	2011 New Year Honours
Christopher John Parsons MNZM	Lieutenant Colonel	New Zealand Special Air Service	2011 Queen's Birthday Honours
Ian Richard Ponse	Warrant Officer Class One	Royal New Zealand Army Logistic Regiment	2011 Queen's Birthday Honours
Darren Smith	Acting Warrant Officer	Royal New Zealand Air Force	2011 Queen's Birthday Honours
Serviceman A	Undisclosed	New Zealand Special Air Service	2011 New Zealand gallantry awards
Keith Murray Bartlett	Squadron Leader	Royal New Zealand Air Force	2012 New Year Honours
John Raymond Boswell	Colonel	New Zealand Army	2012 New Year Honours
Simon Campbell Griffiths	Lieutenant Commander	Royal New Zealand Navy	2012 New Year Honours
Russell Mostyn Kennedy	Squadron Leader	Royal New Zealand Air Force	2012 New Year Honours
David Bruce Ackroyd	Major		2012 Queen's Birthday and Diamond Jubilee Honours
Layamon John Bakewell	Lieutenant		2012 Queen's Birthday and Diamond Jubilee Honours
Aaron Douglas Benton	Squadron Leader	Royal New Zealand Air Force	2012 Queen's Birthday and Diamond Jubilee Honours
Hugh Richard McAslan	Lieutenant Colonel		2012 Queen's Birthday and Diamond Jubilee Honours
Christopher James Wilson	Warrant Officer Class One		2012 Queen's Birthday and Diamond Jubilee Honours
Anatoliy Valerievich Derepa	Lance Corporal		2013 New Year Honours
Athol James Forrest	Group Captain	Royal New Zealand Air Force	2013 New Year Honours
Arthur Jordan Gale	Lieutenant		2013 New Year Honours
Shane Ruane	Major		2013 New Year Honours
Brent Lockwood Wellington	Lieutenant Colonel		2013 New Year Honours
James Ernist Harper	Warrant Officer		2013 Queen's Birthday Honours
Robin Michael Hoult	Lieutenant Colonel		2013 Queen's Birthday Honours
Stefan John Michie	Lieutenant Colonel		2013 Queen's Birthday Honours
Lindsay Norriss	Sergeant		2013 Queen's Birthday Honours
Brent John Quin	Major		2013 Queen's Birthday Honours
Scott Matthew Treleaven	Petty officer	Royal New Zealand Navy	2013 Queen's Birthday Honours
Graeme Alexander Bremner	Warrant Officer Class One		2014 New Year Honours
Paul Allister Mumm	Warrant Officer Class One		2014 New Year Honours
Ewen Vanner	Corporal		2014 New Year Honours
Richard Clive Henstock	Warrant Officer		2014 Queen's Birthday Honours
Richard John MacGregor Weston MNZM	Lieutenant Colonel		2014 Queen's Birthday Honours
Dominic Gareth Crosby Wylie	Captain		2014 Queen's Birthday Honours
David Tale Hamill	Warrant Officer		2015 New Year Honours
Andrew Ross McKinlay	Captain	Royal Regiment of New Zealand Artillery	2015 New Year Honours
B	Undisclosed		2015 New Year Honours
Michael Nochete	Major		2015 New Year Honours
Murray John Thomson	Flight Sergeant	Royal New Zealand Air Force	2015 New Year Honours
Daniel Alexander Edginton	Captain		2015 Queen's Birthday Honours
G	Undisclosed		2015 Queen's Birthday Honours
Robert Victor Keith McGee	Staff Sergeant		2015 Queen's Birthday Honours
Sean Denis Bolton	Major		2015 Queen's Birthday Honours
Simon Andrew Wasley	Lieutenant		2015 Queen's Birthday Honours
Louisa Ann Gritt	Commander	Royal New Zealand Navy	2016 New Year Honours
Anthony Nickel	Chief Petty Officer	Royal New Zealand Navy	2016 New Year Honours
Andrew John Scott	Wing Commander	Royal New Zealand Air Force	2016 New Year Honours
C	Undisclosed		2016 Queen's Birthday Honours
Anthony Clinton Childs	Lieutenant Colonel		2016 Queen's Birthday Honours
J	Undisclosed		2016 Queen's Birthday Honours
Graham Ross Hickman	Major		2017 New Year Honours
Tina Kathleen Grant	Staff Sergeant		2017 Queen's Birthday Honours
Anthony Bryan Howie	Brigadier		2017 Queen's Birthday Honours
Nicholas Michael Pedley	Squadron Leader	Royal New Zealand Air Force	2017 Queen's Birthday Honours
Charmaine Maurita Tate	Major		2017 Queen's Birthday Honours
Andrew James Anthony Thornton	Major		2017 Queen's Birthday Honours
Rhys Lloyd Evans	Squadron Leader	Royal New Zealand Air Force	2018 New Year Honours
Gabrielle Louise Gofton	Captain	Corps of Royal New Zealand Engineers	2018 Queen's Birthday Honours
Jan Joseph Tupuola Peterson	Lieutenant Commander	Royal New Zealand Navy	2019 New Year Honours
Ruth Leonie Putze	Colonel		2019 New Year Honours
S	Undisclosed		2019 New Year Honours
Daniel Lawrence Broughton MNZM	Civilian		2019 Queen's Birthday Honours
Peter Rodd Hurly OStJ	Civilian		2019 Queen's Birthday Honours
Richard Alan Walker	Captain	Royal New Zealand Navy	2019 Queen's Birthday Honours
Michael James Cannon NZBM	Group Captain	Royal New Zealand Air Force	2020 New Year Honours
Michael John Shapland	Brigadier		2020 Queen's Birthday Honours
D	Undisclosed		2021 New Year Honours
Matthew Gordon Carey	Captain		2021 Queen's Birthday Honours
Adam John Modd GM	Lieutenant Colonel	New Zealand Army	2021 Queen's Birthday Honours
Anthony Dean Blythen	Lieutenant Colonel	New Zealand Army	2022 New Year Honours
Richard Francis Deihl	Wing Commander	Royal New Zealand Air Force	2022 New Year Honours
Brendon John Clark	Captain	Royal New Zealand Navy	2023 New Year Honours
L	Undisclosed		2023 New Year Honours
Hayden Peter Smith	Sergeant	Royal New Zealand Air Force	2023 New Year Honours
Glenn Gowthorpe	Group Captain	Royal New Zealand Air Force	2023 King's Birthday and Coronation Honours
George Samuel McInnes	Squadron Leader	Royal New Zealand Air Force	2023 King's Birthday and Coronation Honours
Vanessa Maria Ropitini	Lieutenant Colonel	New Zealand Army	2023 King's Birthday and Coronation Honours
Louis James Munden-Hooper	Lieutenant Commander		2024 New Year Honours
Makoare Kohupara Te Kani MNZM	Lieutenant Commander		2024 New Year Honours
Mark Alan Whiteside	Wing Commander		2024 King's Birthday Honours
Paul Leslie Stockley	Squadron Leader		2025 New Year Honours
Andrew Gilchrist Brown	Commodore		2026 New Year Honours
Robert James Allen	Warrant Officer Class Two		2026 King's Birthday Honours
