= 2015 New Zealand gallantry awards =

Awards list for New Zealand

The 2015 New Zealand gallantry awards were announced via a Special Honours List on 3 December 2015. Recipients are awarded New Zealand gallantry awards.

== New Zealand Gallantry Star (NZGS) ==
- Major Geoffrey Michael Faraday – Royal New Zealand Armoured Corps.

== New Zealand Gallantry Decoration (NZGD) ==
- Sergeant David John Duncan – Royal New Zealand Armoured Corps.
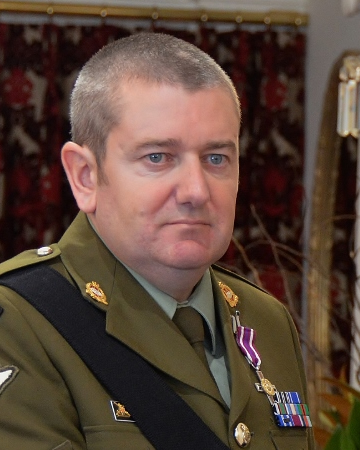
David Duncan

== New Zealand Gallantry Medal (NZGM) ==
- Lance Corporal John Frank Manila Luamanu – Corps of Royal New Zealand Engineers.
- Lance Corporal Rory Patrick Malone – Royal New Zealand Infantry Regiment. Posthumous award.
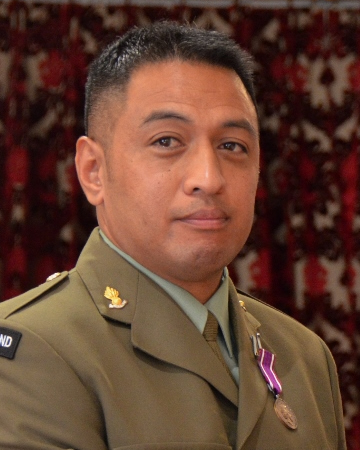
John Luamanu
