= New Zealand Gallantry Star =

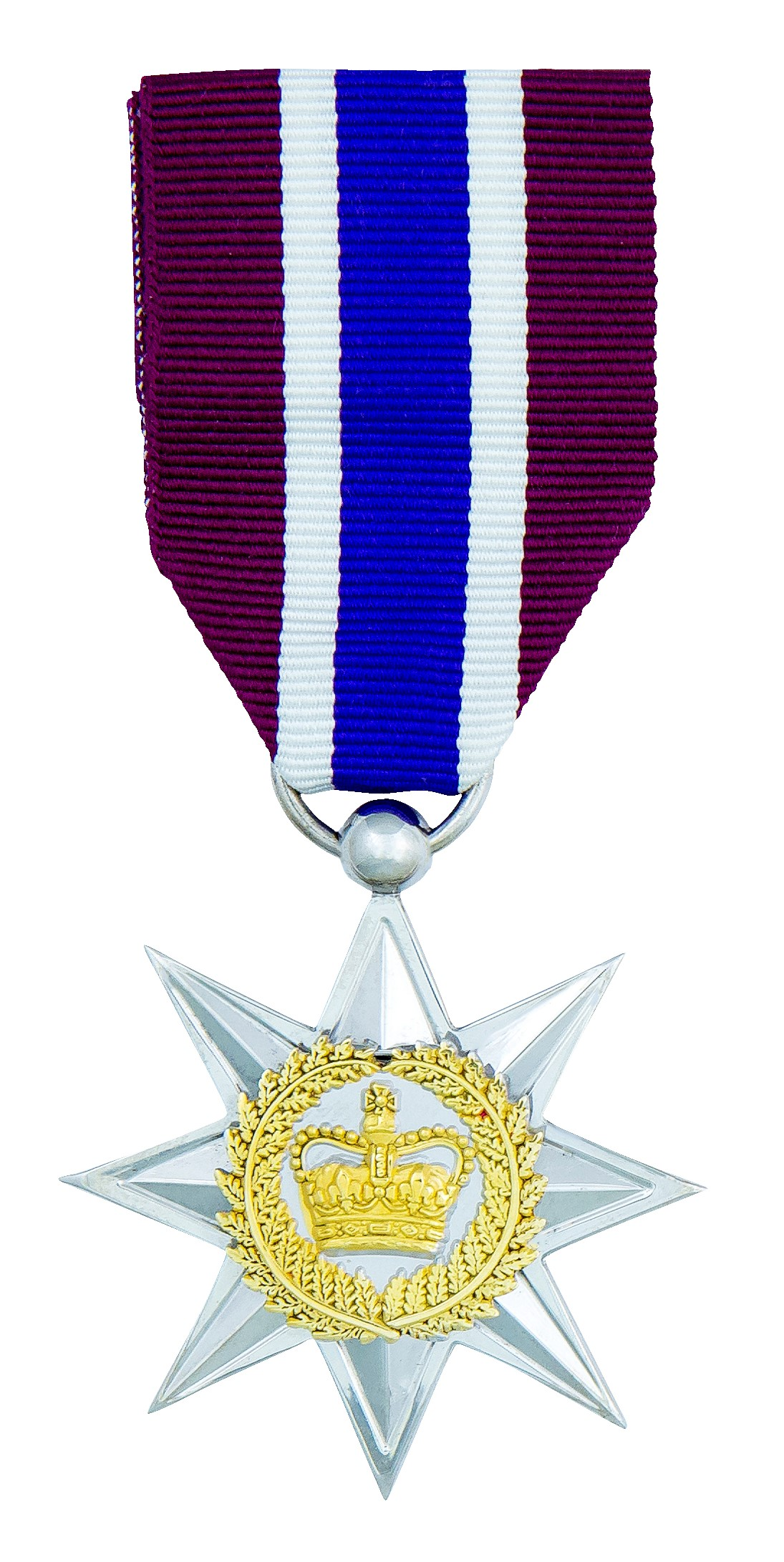
- Obverse of the medal
- Type: Military decoration
- Awarded for: "acts of outstanding gallantry in situations of danger" while involved in war and warlike operational service (including peacekeeping).
- Description: 45 mm, (obverse) faceted silver eight-pointed star of equal points surmounted by the Royal Crown and fern frond wreath emblem; (reverse) inscribed "FOR GALLANTRY - MO TE TOANGA". With ring suspension.
- Presented by: New Zealand
- Eligibility: New Zealand and allied forces
- Status: Currently awarded
- Established: 20 September 1999
- First award: 5 June 2000
- Latest award: 3 December 2015

Highlights
- Total: 5
- Ribbon: 32 mm, crimson with a purple central stripe flanked by narrower white stripes

Precedence
- Next (higher): Companion of the New Zealand Order of Merit
- Next (lower): New Zealand Bravery Star

The New Zealand Gallantry Star (NZGS) is the second level military decoration of the New Zealand armed forces.

It was instituted by Royal Warrant on 20 September 1999 as part of the move to replace British gallantry awards with an indigenous New Zealand Gallantry system. The medal, which may be awarded posthumously, is granted in recognition of "acts of outstanding gallantry in situations of danger" while involved in war or warlike operational service (including peacekeeping).

Bars are awarded to the NZGS in recognition of the performance of further acts of gallantry meriting the award. Recipients are entitled to the postnominal letters "N.Z.G.S.".

This medal replaced the award of the Distinguished Service Order (when awarded for gallantry), the Distinguished Conduct Medal, and the Conspicuous Gallantry Medal.

== Recipients ==
Name	Rank	Unit	Campaign	Date of action
Neville John Reilly	Colonel	Colonel’s List, New Zealand Army	United Nations Mission in East Timor	June–September 1999
David Steven Askin	Corporal	New Zealand Special Air Service	War in Afghanistan (2001–2021)	2011
Jamie Pennell	Commander	New Zealand Special Air Service	War in Afghanistan (2001–2021)	28 June 2011
Albert Henry Moore	Corporal	Royal New Zealand Infantry Regiment	War in Afghanistan (2001–2021)	3 August 2011
Geoffrey Michael Faraday	Major	Royal New Zealand Armoured Corps	United Nations Mission in South Sudan	17–29 April 2014

== See also ==
- New Zealand gallantry awards
- New Zealand bravery awards
- New Zealand campaign medals
