= New Zealand Bravery Medal =

New Zealand medal for bravery

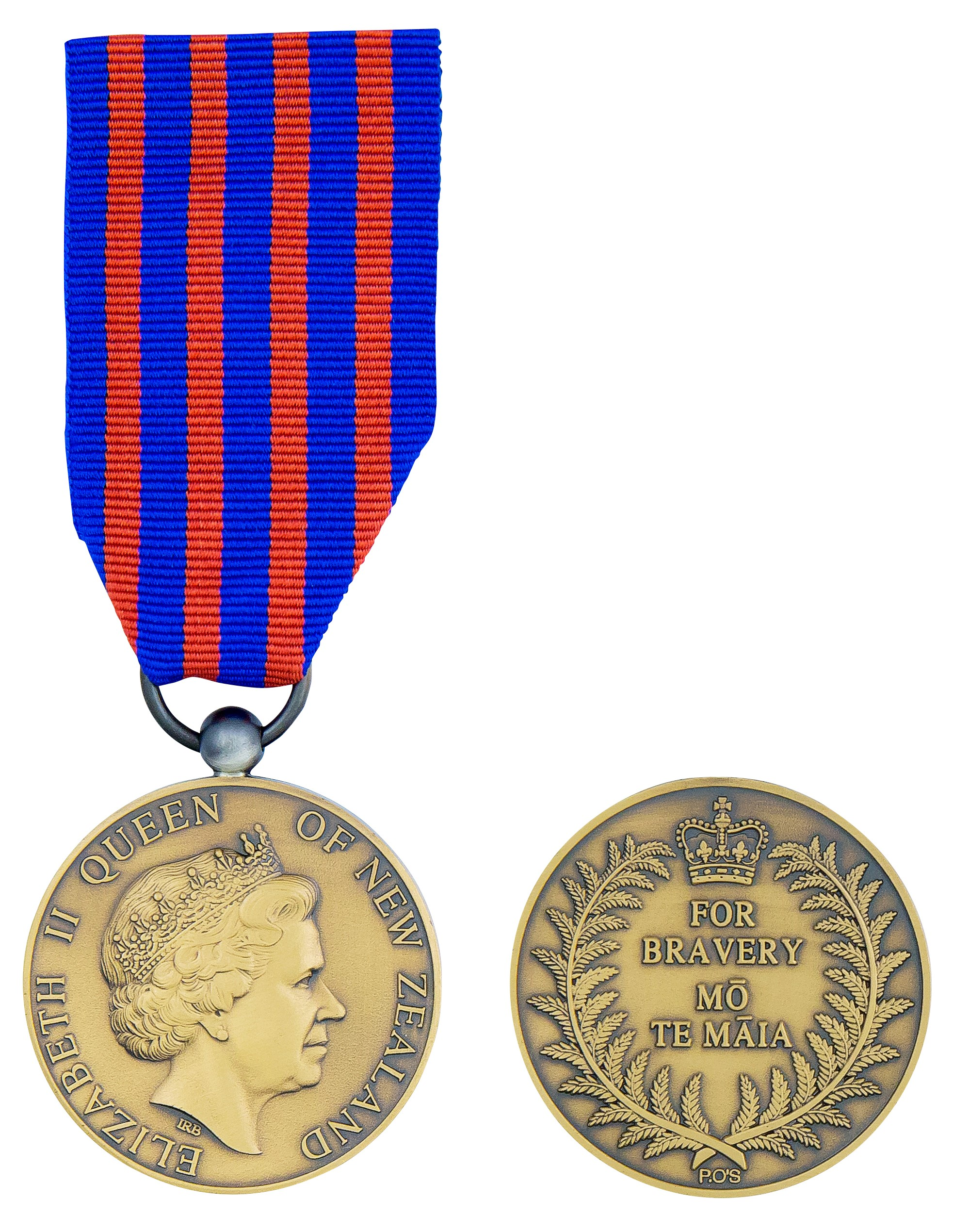
- Obverse and reverse of the medal
- Type: Civil decoration
- Awarded for: "acts of bravery"
- Description: Bronze disk, 38 mm diameter
- Presented by: New Zealand
- Eligibility: Those performing acts of bravery in, or meriting recognition by, New Zealand
- Status: Currently awarded
- Established: 20 September 1999
- First award: 23 October 1999
- Latest award: 13 December 2025

Highlights
- Total recipients: 154
- Ribbon: 32 mm, nine equal and alternating stripes of bright blue and crimson

Precedence
- Next (higher): New Zealand Gallantry Medal
- Next (lower): Royal Victorian Medal

The New Zealand Bravery Medal (NZBM) is the fourth-level civil decoration of New Zealand.

It was instituted by Royal Warrant on 20 September 1999 as part of the move to replace British bravery awards with an indigenous New Zealand Bravery system. The medal, which may be awarded posthumously, is granted in recognition of "acts of bravery". The medal is primarily a civilian award, but it is also awarded to members of the armed forces who perform acts of bravery in non-operational circumstances (given that the New Zealand gallantry awards may only be awarded "while involved in war and warlike operational service (including peacekeeping)".

Bars are awarded to the NZBM in recognition of the performance of further acts of bravery meriting the award. Recipients are entitled to the postnominal letters NZBM.

The medal replaced the award of the Queen's Commendation for Brave Conduct and the Queen's Commendation for Valuable Service in the Air in respect of acts of bravery in, or meriting recognition by, New Zealand.

== Recipients ==
The following is a list of recipients of the New Zealand Bravery Medal. As of December 2025, 154 people had received the medal.

Name	Awarded
Stephen Acton	23 June 2014
Mark John Allen	2 December 2013
Sophie Christina Allison	6 December 2024
Ronald Stewart Andrew	6 December 2024
Michael Thomas John Andrews	6 December 2024
Meli Graham Leighton Benjamin Balenivalu	6 December 2024
Mark Thomas Bancroft	6 December 2024
Philip Samuel Blakeman	14 October 2006
Roger Terry Blumhardt	29 January 2005
Peter Winston Booth	2 April 2011
Jan Margaret Boyd	2 December 2013
John Boyd	2 December 2013
Richard Mervyn Bracey	13 December 2025
Lance Henry Bradford	16 December 2021
Roger William Bright	3 May 2008
Zak Randall Bristow	6 December 2024
Michael John Brooklands	23 June 2014
Peter Robert Broughton	23 October 1999
Adam John Brown	6 December 2024
Paul Buckley	2 April 2011
Brendon Drew Burchell	23 October 1999
Luke Jonathan Burgess	23 June 2014
Patrick Martin John Burke	29 January 2005
Susan Rebecca Burke	13 December 2025
Alan Maurice Butcher (posthumous)	23 June 2014
Shaun Bruce Campbell	14 October 2006
Michael James Cannon	23 October 1999
Kevin Carr	23 June 2014
Gregory Edward Ross Cater	2 December 2013
Paul Lindsay Chandler	29 January 2005
Tracey Lee-Anne Chapman	23 October 1999
James Iain Christie	2 April 2011
Bradley James Clark	2 April 2011
Hope Angeline Louise Clayton	6 December 2024
Daniel James Cleaver	29 January 2005
Nicholas John Clere	2 April 2011
Shane Andrew Cole	23 June 2014
James Phillip Collins	2 December 2013
Maurice Ugo Conti (honorary)	2 April 2011
Sophie Conti (honorary)	2 April 2011
Nicolas Warren Corley	2 April 2011
Hayden Paul Cornwell	13 December 2025
Shane Allan Cowles	23 June 2014
Kevin Rex Crozier	23 June 2014
Brendan John Dobbyn	29 January 2005
Peter James Duncan	29 January 2005
Keran Mana Durrant	14 October 2006
Grant Wayne Exeter	2 April 2011
Friederike Faber	13 December 2025
Graham Robert Ford	29 January 2005
Karen Ruth Foster	23 October 1999
Anne Michele Francis	23 October 1999
Donald Garry Fraser	2 April 2011
Lisa Kay Franken	23 October 1999
Kali Peaua Fungavaka	14 October 2006
William John Funnell, MBE	23 October 1999
Harshad Ashok Ghodke	13 December 2025
Stephen Robert Gibb	23 October 1999
William John Gilchrist	29 January 2005
David Joseph Goldfinch	6 December 2024
Richard Mark Green	23 June 2014
Terrence David Gyde	23 June 2014
Peter Alexander Hanne	2 April 2011
Joshua Claude Head	6 December 2024
Christopher Michael Thomas Henry	1 August 2016
Matthew John Hollis	29 January 2005
Christine Margaret Jackman	2 April 2011
Craig Munro Jackson	23 June 2014
Carl Jennings	1 August 2016
Tyson Wiremu Job	14 October 2006
Danny Edward Johanson	23 June 2014
Graham John Watkin Jones	29 January 2005
Heath Courtenay Jones, NZBD	13 December 2025
Christopher Mark Jowsey	29 January 2005
Martin Joseph Kay	2 December 2013
Ethan James Kennedy	29 January 2005
Lois Patricia Kennedy	2 December 2013
Alexander James Christian Henry Kerr	13 December 2025
Rodney James Khan	6 December 2024
Michael Douglas Kneebone	23 June 2014
Joshua James Kumbaroff	23 June 2014
Daniel James Lee	23 June 2014
Michael John Lennard	23 June 2014
Maxwell Allan Lewis	6 December 2024
Ryan William Lilleby	1 August 2016
Edward Michael Luxford	2 December 2013
Jade Ronald Lynn	2 December 2013
Wayne Maley	16 December 2021
Kurtis Anthony Maney	6 December 2024
Michael Anthony Marvin	26 October 2022
Jan Yvonne McCrea	23 October 1999
Christopher Steven McDowell	1 August 2016
Ross William McEwan	23 October 1999
John Joseph McNamee	23 October 1999
Mark Garry Miller	16 December 2021
Johan Artemus Mulder	2 December 2013
Hamish Everett Neal (posthumous)	29 January 2005
Patrick Noiseux	6 December 2024
Thomas Deane O'Connor	1 August 2016
Conor Liam O'Leary	2 April 2011
David Leonard O'Loughlin	29 January 2005
Officer A (name withheld)	6 December 2024
Officer B (name withheld)	6 December 2024
Officer C (name withheld)	6 December 2024
Officer D (name withheld)	6 December 2024
George Puturangi Paekau	1 August 2016
Dion Wayne Palmer	14 October 2006
Kerry Charles Palmer	14 October 2006
Simon James Payton	23 June 2014
Liam Pham	2 December 2013
Richard Frank Platt	23 June 2014
Dean William Pleydell	23 October 1999
Mark Mattie Povey	23 October 1999
Floyd Steven Pratt	23 October 1999
Ryan Ross Ramsay	6 December 2024
Kenneth William Reilly	2 December 2013
Heike Pio Jan Reitsma	6 December 2024
Patrick Anthony Rice	23 October 1999
David Gwyther Richards	1 August 2016
Michael James Robinson	16 December 2021
Daniel James Rockhouse	31 December 2014
Paul John Rodwell	23 June 2014
Police Officer S (name withheld)	4 June 2018
Shaun Paul Sexton	14 October 2006
Scott Martin Shadbolt	23 June 2014
John Rodney Sherman	6 December 2024
Kevin Albert Singer	29 January 2005
Mark Charles Smith	29 January 2005
Stephen James Smith	2 April 2011
Steven David Smylie	23 June 2014
Caine Francis Spick	29 January 2005
Cory John Stewart	23 June 2014
David Edward Whawhai Stewart (posthumous)	23 October 1999
George Allan Stewart	3 May 2008
Jaime Eliza Stewart	6 December 2024
Anthony Wayne Tamakehu	23 June 2014
Duncan Taylor (posthumous)	29 January 2005
Joan Diane Taylor	14 October 2006
Mark Taylor	2 April 2011
Sonny Wayne Terure	23 October 1999
Ngametua Tetava	31 December 2004
Pamela Ruth Thompson	6 December 2024
Jeremy Franco Toschi	6 December 2024
Keith Desmond Troon	23 October 1999
Christopher Charles Turnbull	2 December 2013
John Vaughan (posthumous)	29 January 2005
Hugo Johannes Josephus Verhagen	14 October 2006
Andrew Stephen Warne	2 December 2013
James Nicholas Watkins	1 August 2016
Cameron Joel Whittaker	6 December 2024
Mark David Whittaker	23 June 2014
Colin John Wiggins	2 December 2013
Michael David Yeates	23 June 2014
Jonathan Jordan Young (posthumous)	13 December 2025

== See also ==
- Orders, decorations, and medals of New Zealand
- New Zealand gallantry awards
- New Zealand bravery awards
- New Zealand campaign medals
