= New Zealand bravery awards =

Decorations for bravery in New Zealand

The New Zealand bravery awards are civil decorations for bravery that were instituted in 1999. In some circumstances, the awards can be awarded to military personnel.

== Background ==
Since the end of WWII there have been constant moves towards an independent New Zealand honours system. This has resulted in a new system of New Zealand honours, military gallantry and civil bravery awards, and campaign medals.

The New Zealand Bravery Awards are designed to recognise the actions of those persons who save or attempt to save the life of another person and in the course of which they place their own safety or life at risk. The awards are primarily for civilians but may be awarded to defence force staff for acts for which gallantry or other awards are not appropriate. The level of an award is generally determined by the nature of the incident that has resulted in an act of bravery, the degree of risk to the life of the person performing the act and their personal skills or qualifications relevant to the incident, and whether the actions were taken with disregard for their own safety.

The bravery awards were instituted by a royal warrant on 20 September 1999.

== Design of awards ==
The New Zealand Cross is similar in design to the original New Zealand Cross instituted by the Government in 1869 for award for acts of bravery during the New Zealand Wars of the nineteenth century. The design has been amended by including gold New Zealand fern fronds (replacing gold laurel leaves). It also uses the current royal crown—St Edward's Crown—replacing a Victorian crown. The cross is made of silver and gold. The original New Zealand Cross was instituted by an Order in Council, and later sanctioned by Queen Victoria, in 1869. It was for acts of bravery during the New Zealand Land (1860–1872). In 1895, it was proposed that the New Zealand Cross should be extended to cover acts of bravery by civilians, but this did not eventuate.

The New Zealand Bravery Star is a silver eight-pointed star (with four long and four short points). The design is the reverse of the shape of the New Zealand Cross. The New Zealand Bravery Decoration is a silver cross of similar shape to the New Zealand Cross. The New Zealand Bravery Medal is a bronze medal bearing on the obverse (front) the effigy of Queen Elizabeth II.

All awards bear the inscription "For bravery – mō te māia" on the reverse.

Complete name	Ranks / Letters	Insignia	Ribbon	Founder	Awarded to/for	Refs
New Zealand Cross	NZC			Elizabeth II	"For acts of great bravery in situations of extreme danger"	
New Zealand Bravery Star	NZBS			Elizabeth II	"For acts of outstanding bravery in situations of danger"	
New Zealand Bravery Decoration	NZBD			Elizabeth II	"For acts of exceptional bravery in situations of danger"	
New Zealand Bravery Medal	NZBM			Elizabeth II	"For acts of bravery"	

== See also ==
- New Zealand gallantry awards
- New Zealand campaign medals
- New Zealand honours order of wearing
