= 2011 New Zealand gallantry awards =

Awards list for New Zealand

The 2011 New Zealand gallantry awards were announced via a Special Honours List on 1 October 2011, although the awards made to Serviceman A and Serviceman F were not made public until 8 March 2018 for security reasons. All the awards were made in recognition of actions by New Zealand armed forces personnel in Afghanistan during 2010.

== New Zealand Gallantry Star (NZGS) ==
- Corporal Albert Henry Moore – Royal New Zealand Infantry Regiment

== New Zealand Gallantry Decoration (NZGD) ==
- Lance Corporal Allister Donald Baker – Royal New Zealand Infantry Regiment
- Corporal Matthew John Ball – Royal New Zealand Corps of Signals

== New Zealand Gallantry Medal (NZGM) ==
- Serviceman F – New Zealand Special Air Service
- Warrant Officer Class Two Denis Joachim Wanihi – Royal New Zealand Army Logistic Regiment

== New Zealand Distinguished Service Decoration (DSD) ==
- Serviceman A – New Zealand Special Air Service
