= King's Service Order =

Order awarded by the monarch of New Zealand

King's Service Order Te Tohu Whakanui Ratonga a te Kīngi
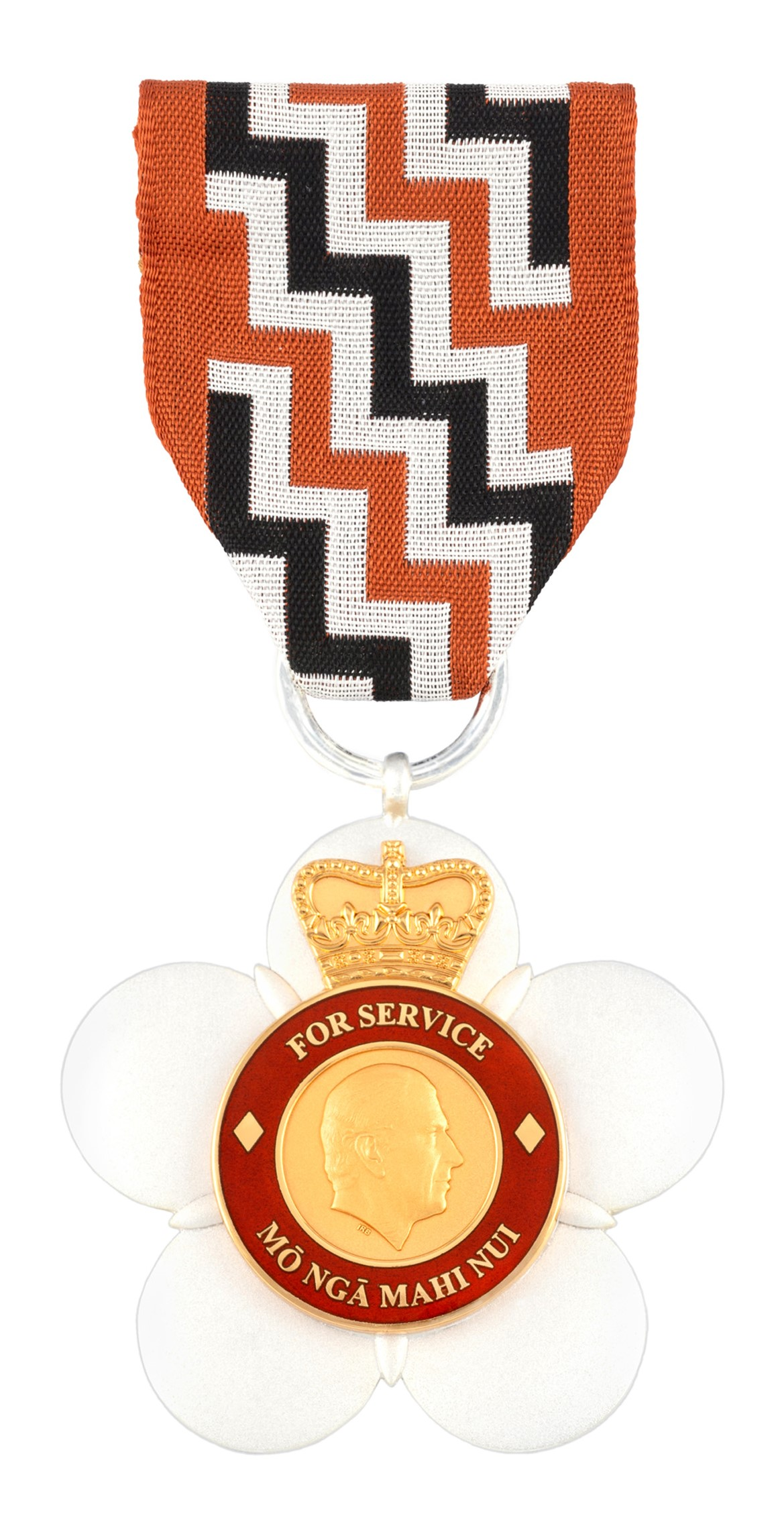
- The badge of a Companion of the King's Service Order

Awarded by the Monarch of New Zealand
- Established: 13 March 1975
- Country: New Zealand
- Founder: Elizabeth II
- Sovereign Head: Charles III
- Post-nominals: QSO / KSO

Statistics
- Last induction: 1 June 2026
- Total inductees: 220 (QSO); 27 (KSO)

Precedence
- Next (higher): New Zealand Bravery Star
- Next (lower): Officer of the New Zealand Order of Merit
- Related: King's Service Medal
- Ribbon of the King's Service Order

The King's Service Order (KSO; Māori: Te Tohu Whakanui Ratonga a te Kīngi) established by royal warrant of Queen Elizabeth II on 13 March 1975, is used to recognise "valuable voluntary service to the community or meritorious and faithful services to the Crown or similar services within the public sector, whether in elected or appointed office". This order was created after a review of New Zealand's honours system in 1974. The King's Service Order replaced the Imperial Service Order in New Zealand.

The order was created as the Queen's Service Order (Māori: Te Tohu Whakanui Ratonga a te Kuini) in 1975 and renamed in 2024. The original title of the Order recognised the fact that Queen Elizabeth II was the first New Zealand monarch to be officially titled Queen of New Zealand. On 3 May 2024, following the accession of Charles III to the throne on the death of Elizabeth II, the order was renamed the King's Service Order. The change did not apply retrospectively to previously awarded badges, or affect the associated post-nominals of previous recipients.

== History ==
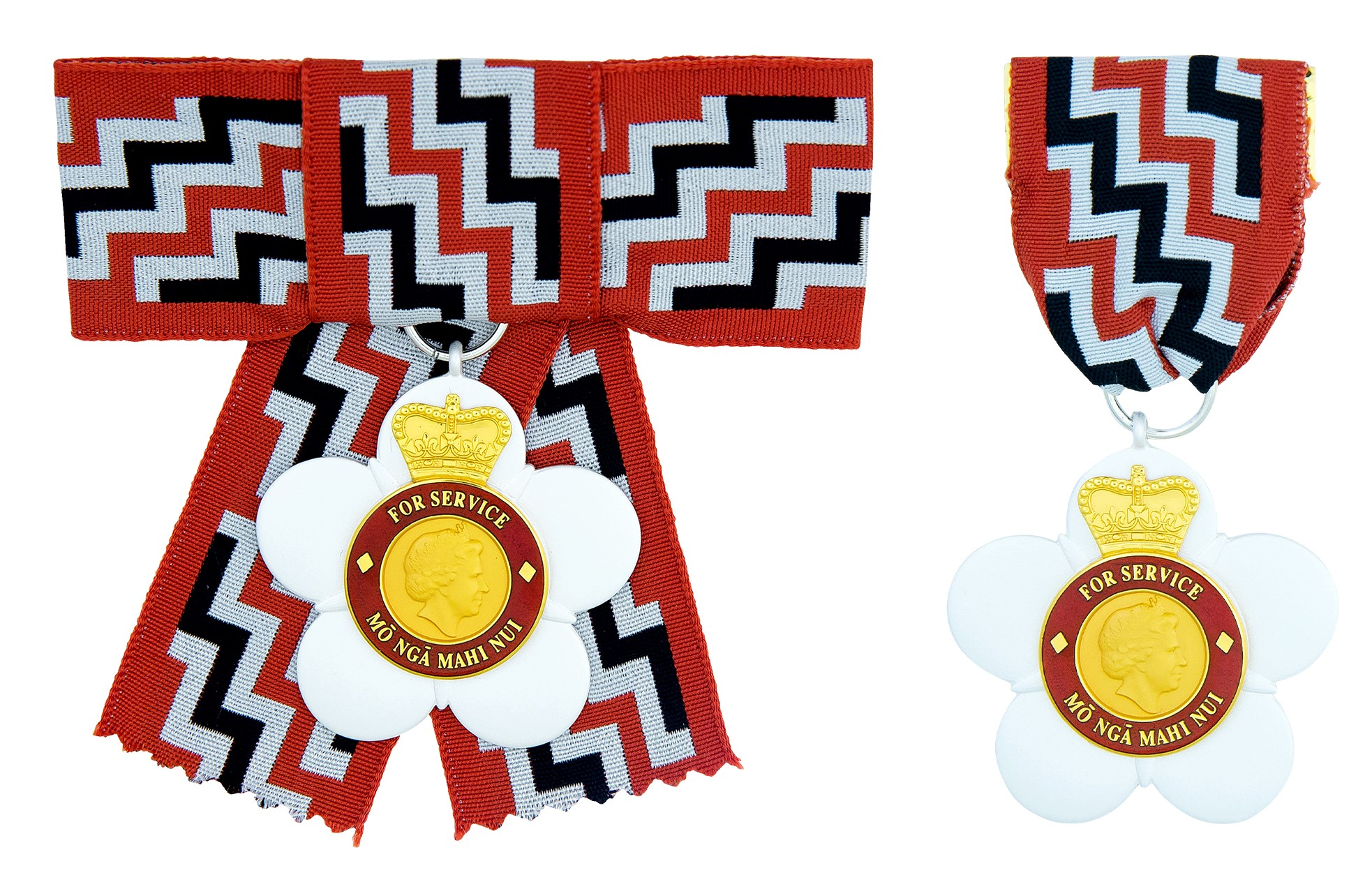
The badge of a Companion of the Queen's Service Order from the reign of Elizabeth II

The King's Service Order (KSO), then known as the Queen's Service Order (QSO), was instituted by royal warrant dated 13 March 1975 and in an amending royal warrant dated 15 October 1981, as a single fourth-level Order sub-divided into two divisions: "For Community Service" and "For Public Services". Instituted under the same royal warrant was an associated Medal of the Order, designated The Queen's Service Medal (QSM), which ranks as a sixth level honour and, like the Order, had the same two sub-divisions.

The title of the Order recognised the fact that Queen Elizabeth II was the first New Zealand monarch to be officially titled Queen of New Zealand.

The Order and Medal arose out of the 1974–1975 review of the honours system at a time when only traditional British honours were available. It met the need for an honour to recognise voluntary service to the community and service through elected and appointed office. Both the Order and Medal are for civilians only and military service is not eligible.

In 1995, the honours system was reviewed by the Prime Minister's Honours Advisory Committee. In its report, the Committee recommended that the Order and associated Medal be retained, but reconstituted without the sub-divisions should a new New Zealand Order of Merit be instituted. The New Zealand Order of Merit was subsequently instituted in 1996 and after 10 years of operation side by side, it was decided that the time had come to disestablish the two sub-divisions.

In April 2007, The Queen signed a new royal warrant cancelling the 1975 and 1981 Warrants and instituting the Order and its associated Medal without sub-divisions. Also confirmed was the status of the Governor-General as both Principal Companion of the Order and as an "Additional Companion" in their own right.

== Composition ==
The monarch of New Zealand is the Sovereign Head of the order and those who are appointed as members are "Companions". Companions are classified into Ordinary, Extra, Additional, and Honorary members. Ordinary Companions are those being New Zealand citizens or citizens of Commonwealth realms. Ordinary membership is limited to 50 appointments per annum. Members of the Royal Family can be named "Extra Companions". Those citizens of countries not sharing the monarch of New Zealand as their head of state may be appointed as "Honorary Companions". "Additional Companions" may be appointed in honour of important royal, state or national occasions.

The Governor-General of New Zealand is an additional companion of the order in her own right and is also the order's "Principal Companion". Former Governors-General or their spouses, may also be appointed as an "Additional Companion". The clerk of New Zealand's Executive Council, or another person appointed by the Sovereign Head, is the "Secretary and Registrar" of the Order.

Companions are entitled to use the post-nominal letters "QSO". Before 2007, awards were distinguished between those made for "public" and "community service". Appointments to the order are made by royal warrant under the monarch's royal sign-manual and countersigned by the Principal Companion or the Secretary and Register in their place. Appointments are announced in the New Zealand Gazette.

== Insignia ==
The insignia of the order is a stylised mānuka flower with five petals, which contains the effigy of the reigning monarch surrounded by a red circle inscribed FOR SERVICE — MŌ NGA MAHI NUI, crowned at the top. The ribbon has a traditional Māori Poutama motif of black, white and red ochre (kōkōwai) diagonal 'steps' (signifying the growth of man, striving ever upwards) in the centre with red ochre stripes along each edge of the ribbon. The insignia is worn on the left lapel of the coat for men or from a ribbon tied in a bow at the left shoulder for women. As with other ribbon-born medals, women wear the QSO in the male fashion when in uniform. Women have been known to wear it thus, even in civilian attire, such as Anne, Princess Royal in the otherwise male procession behind her father's coffin. The Governor-General of New Zealand additionally wears the badge on a thin gold chain.

With the change in name from the Queen's Service Order to the King's Service Order the insignia of the order has been updated accordingly.

Since the 2024 Birthday Honours, the postnominal letters "KSO" are now conferred.

== Medal ==
There is also a related King's Service Medal, which is a silver circular medal bearing the effigy of the reigning monarch on the obverse, and the Coat of Arms of New Zealand on the reverse. The ribbon or bow pattern is the same as the Queen's Service Order. The medal, before 2005, was also awarded for "public" and "community service".

== Important members and officers ==
- Sovereign Head: His Majesty The King
- Principal Companion: The Governor-General
- Extra Companion: The Princess Royal, KG, KT, GCVO, GCStJ, QSO, GCL, CMM, CD, ADC (1990)
  - Beverley, Lady Reeves, QSO (1990) – Former Viceregal Consort of New Zealand
  - Dame Silvia Cartwright, ONZ, PCNZM, DBE, QSO, DStJ (2006) – Former Governor-General of New Zealand
  - Sir Anand Satyanand, GNZM, QSO, KStJ (2007) – Former Governor-General of New Zealand
  - Susan, Lady Satyanand, QSO (2011) – Former Viceregal Consort of New Zealand
  - Lieutenant General Sir Jerry Mateparae, GNZM, QSO, KStJ (2011) – Former Governor-General of New Zealand and former Chief of Defence Force
  - Janine, Lady Mateparae, QSO (2016) – Former Viceregal Consort of New Zealand
  - Dame Patsy Reddy, GNZM, CVO, QSO, DStJ (2016) – Former Governor-General of New Zealand
  - Dame Cindy Kiro, GNZM, QSO, DStJ (2021) – Governor-General of New Zealand
- Secretary and Registrar: Rachel Hayward

== See also ==
- British and Commonwealth orders and decorations
- New Zealand Honours System
