= 2011 New Zealand bravery awards =

The 2011 New Zealand bravery awards were announced via a Special Honours List on 2 April 2011. Some recipients were recognised for acts of bravery following the Napier shootings that occurred on 7 May 2009.

== New Zealand Bravery Star (NZBS) ==
- Constable Michael John Burne – New Zealand Police
- Austin Bernard Hemmings – Posthumous award – died 25 September 2018.
- Leonard Rex Holmwood.
- Senior Constable Dennis Michael Hurworth – New Zealand Police.
- Antony McClean – Posthumous award – died 15 April 2008.
- Anthony Walter Mulder – Posthumous award – died 15 April 2008.
- Detective Sergeant Timothy Nigel Smith – New Zealand Police.
- Senior Constable Paul Anthony Symonds – New Zealand Police.

== New Zealand Bravery Decoration (NZBD) ==
- Sergeant Heath Courtenay Jones – New Zealand Police.
- Senior Sergeant Anthony James Miller – New Zealand Police.
- Wing Commander Anthony Frederick Ronald Millsom – Royal New Zealand Air Force.
- Constable James Alexander Muir – New Zealand Police.
- Senior Firefighter Mervyn Raymond Neil – New Zealand Fire Service.
- Inspector Michael Ross O'Leary – New Zealand Police.
- Constable Kevin Lawrence Rooney – New Zealand Police.
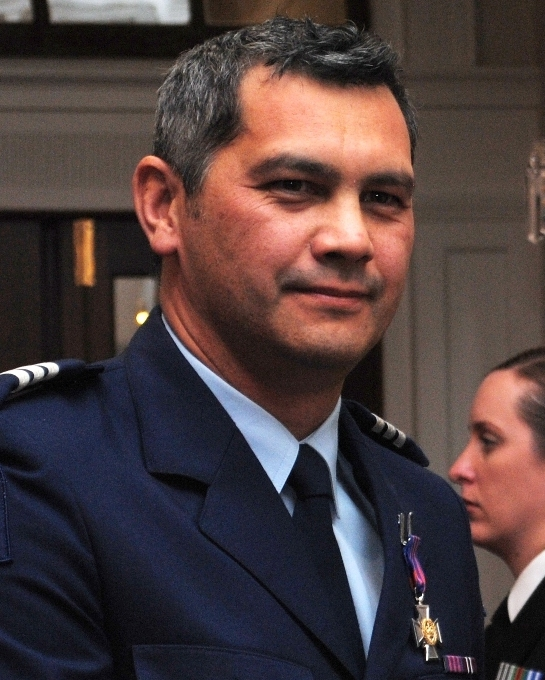
Heath Jones

== New Zealand Bravery Medal (NZBM) ==
- Peter Winston Booth.
- Detective Paul Buckley – New Zealand Police.
- James Iain Christie.
- Senior Constable Bradley James Clark – New Zealand Police.
- Detective Sergeant Nicholas John Clere – New Zealand Police.
- Constable Nicholas Warren Corley – New Zealand Police.
- Maurice Ugo Conti.
- Sophie Conti.
- Grant Wayne Exeter.
- Donald Garry Fraser.
- Peter Alexander Hanne.
- Christine Margaret Jackman.
- Conor Liam O'Leary
- Advanced Paramedic Stephen James Smith – St John Ambulance Service.
- Chief Petty Officer Mark Taylor – Royal New Zealand Navy.

== New Zealand Order of Merit (MNZM) ==
- Roger Murray Burton – For service to the community.
