= New Zealand gallantry awards =

New Zealand armed forces awards for heroism

Prior to 1999 the New Zealand armed forces received honours of the United Kingdom, including military decorations and campaign medals. Since the end of World War II there have been constant moves towards an independent New Zealand honours system. This has resulted in a new system of New Zealand honours, military gallantry and civil bravery awards, and campaign medals.

| Complete name | Ranks / Letters | Insignia | Ribbon | Established | Founder | Motto | Awarded to/for | Refs |
|---|---|---|---|---|---|---|---|---|
| Victoria Cross for New Zealand | VC | | | 20 September 1999 | Elizabeth II | | "For most conspicuous gallantry, or some daring or pre-eminent act of valour or self-sacrifice or extreme devotion to duty in the presence of the enemy or of belligerents" | |
| New Zealand Gallantry Star | NZGS | | | 20 September 1999 | Elizabeth II | FOR GALLANTRY – MŌ TE TOANGA | "For acts of outstanding gallantry in situations of danger" | |
| New Zealand Gallantry Decoration | NZGD | | | 20 September 1999 | Elizabeth II | FOR GALLANTRY – MŌ TE TOANGA | "For acts of exceptional gallantry in situations of danger" | |
| New Zealand Gallantry Medal | NZGM | | | 20 September 1999 | Elizabeth II | FOR GALLANTRY – MŌ TE TOANGA | "For acts of gallantry" | |

== See also ==
- New Zealand bravery awards (civil)
- New Zealand campaign medals
- New Zealand Honours Order of Precedence
- New Zealand Royal Honours System
