= New Zealand royal honours system =

Orders, decorations, and medals of New Zealand

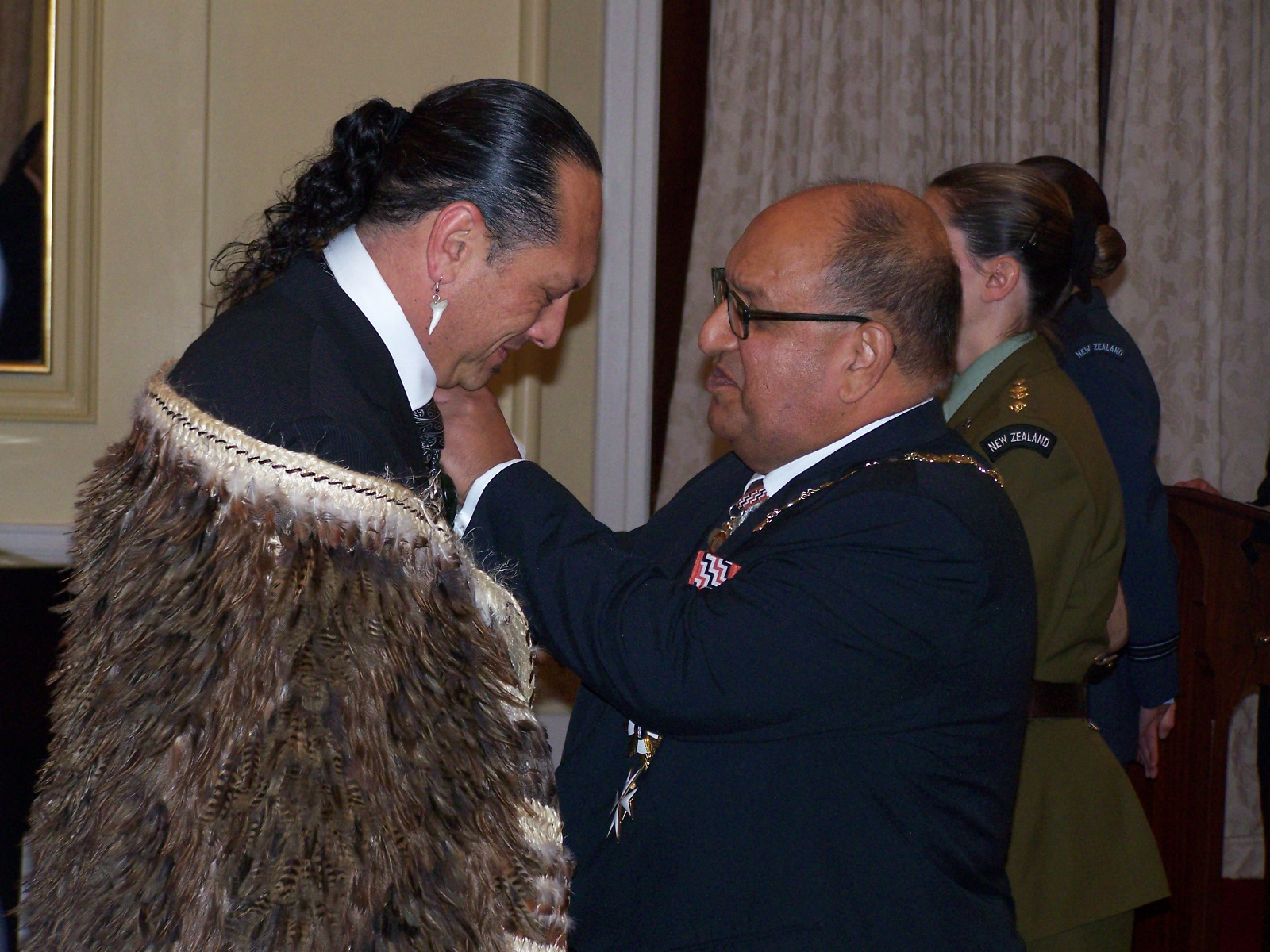
Investiture of Derek Lardelli as ONZM by Governor-General of New Zealand Sir Anand Satyanand for services to Māori arts at a ceremony at Government House, Wellington in September 2008

The New Zealand royal honours system, a system of orders, decorations and medals, recognises achievements of, or service by, New Zealanders or others in connection with New Zealand. Until 1975, New Zealand used the British honours system. Since then, the country has introduced a number of uniquely New Zealand honours, and as of 2021, only the dynastic British honours continue in active use in New Zealand, with the exception of the Order of the Companions of Honour, to which Dame Kiri Te Kanawa, a New Zealand soprano, was appointed in 2018.

The New Zealand royal honours comprise the Order of New Zealand, the New Zealand Order of Merit, the King's Service Order, King's Service Medal, New Zealand bravery awards, New Zealand gallantry awards, the New Zealand Distinguished Service Decoration and the New Zealand Antarctic Medal.

The monarch of New Zealand awards honours on ministerial advice. However, certain awards remain in the exclusive gift of the monarch.

The Honours Unit of the Department of the Prime Minister and Cabinet administers the New Zealand honours system.

== History ==
Since the beginning of settlement in the mid-nineteenth century, British honours were awarded in New Zealand. In 1848, Governor George Grey received the first honour granted to a New Zealand resident, becoming a Knight Commander of the Order of the Bath. For more than a hundred years the British honours system was used for New Zealand. In appropriate cases, this included peerages and baronetcies.

Bernard Freyberg, although not born in New Zealand and resident outside New Zealand for a considerable portion of his life, had significant connections with New Zealand, and was ennobled while serving as governor-general of New Zealand in 1951. The current bearer of the title, Valerian Freyberg, 3rd Baron Freyberg, is based in the United Kingdom and was one of the 92 hereditary peers elected to sit in the House of Lords until the remaining hereditary seats were abolished.

Arthur Porritt, a New Zealand-born physician, surgeon, statesman and athlete, became a baronet in 1963 and was appointed governor-general of New Zealand in 1967 (the first person born in New Zealand to serve in this post), serving until 1972. He moved to live in England upon the expiry of his term as governor-general, and was later ennobled in 1973. Porritt was resident in England at the time he was made a baronet and at the time he received his peerage. His son, Jonathon Porritt, is a resident of England and is entitled to register his claim to his father's baronetcy (but not to his peerage, since it was a life peerage). He has so far declined to do so.

In 1975, after a review of the system, two uniquely New Zealand honours were integrated into it: the Queen's Service Order, and its affiliated Medal. In 1987, the Order of New Zealand was instituted as the supreme New Zealand honour.

In 1996, Robin Cooke, a New Zealand judge, was awarded a life peerage. Following his ennoblement until his retirement at the age of 75, Cooke sat in the British House of Lords as a law lord, and ex officio also in the Judicial Committee of the Privy Council, which at that time was the highest authority in the New Zealand judicial system. Cooke is the only Commonwealth judge from outside Britain to have attained this distinction (James Atkin was born in Australia but only spent the first three years of his life there before returning permanently to England and Wales). The discontinuance of appeals to the Privy Council from New Zealand in 2003 (combined with the cessation of the judicial functions of the House of Lords since then) makes it unlikely that a similar honour will be granted in future on the strength of judicial services rendered in New Zealand.

A further review of the New Zealand royal honours system in 1996 and 1997 resulted in the termination of awards of almost all British honours and the creation of a new five-level New Zealand Order of Merit to replace them. In 2000, Prime Minister Helen Clark announced that no further awards of knighthoods and damehoods would be made in the New Zealand honours system. However, in March 2009, Prime Minister John Key announced the restoration of knighthoods and damehoods to the honours system, with past recipients of the two highest grades of the New Zealand Order of Merit to be eligible to receive titles.

== Orders and other honours ==
Complete name	Grade (Letters)	Insignia	Ribbon	Established	Founder	Motto	Awarded to/for	Associated awards	Refs
Most Noble Order of the Garter	Knight Companion (KG); Lady Companion (LG)			23 April 1348	Edward III	Honi soit qui mal y pense ("shame upon him who thinks evil of it")	Relating to England and Wales	None	
Most Ancient and Most Noble Order of the Thistle	Knight (KT); Lady (LT)			29 May 1687	James VII and II	Nemo me impune lacessit ("No one provokes me with impunity")	Relating to Scotland	None	
Royal Victorian Order	Knight or Dame Grand Cross (GCVO)			21 April 1896	Victoria	Victoria	Services to the Crown	Royal Victorian Medal, Royal Victorian Chain	
Royal Victorian Order	Knight Commander (KCVO) Dame Commander (DCVO)			21 April 1896	Victoria	Victoria	Services to the Crown	Royal Victorian Medal, Royal Victorian Chain	
Royal Victorian Order	Commander (CVO)			21 April 1896	Victoria	Victoria	Services to the Crown	Royal Victorian Medal, Royal Victorian Chain	
Royal Victorian Order	Lieutenant (LVO)			21 April 1896	Victoria	Victoria	Services to the Crown	Royal Victorian Medal, Royal Victorian Chain	
Royal Victorian Order	Member (MVO)			21 April 1896	Victoria	Victoria	Services to the Crown	Royal Victorian Medal, Royal Victorian Chain	
Order of Merit	Member (OM)			23 June 1902	Edward VII	For merit	Military, science, art, literature, culture	None	
Order of New Zealand	Member (ONZ)			6 February 1987	Elizabeth II	None	Outstanding service to the Crown and people of New Zealand in a civil or military capacity	None	
New Zealand Order of Merit	Knight or Dame Grand Companion (GNZM)			30 May 1996	Elizabeth II	For Merit — Tohu Hiranga	Meritorious service to the Crown and the nation or who have become distinguished by their eminence, talents, contributions, or other merits	None	
New Zealand Order of Merit	Knight Companion (KNZM); Dame Companion (DNZM)			30 May 1996	Elizabeth II	For Merit — Tohu Hiranga	Meritorious service to the Crown and the nation or who have become distinguished by their eminence, talents, contributions, or other merits	None	
New Zealand Order of Merit	Companion (CNZM)			30 May 1996	Elizabeth II	For Merit — Tohu Hiranga	Meritorious service to the Crown and the nation or who have become distinguished by their eminence, talents, contributions, or other merits	None	
New Zealand Order of Merit	Officer (ONZM)			30 May 1996	Elizabeth II	For Merit — Tohu Hiranga	Meritorious service to the Crown and the nation or who have become distinguished by their eminence, talents, contributions, or other merits	None	
New Zealand Order of Merit	Member (MNZM)			30 May 1996	Elizabeth II	For Merit — Tohu Hiranga	Meritorious service to the Crown and the nation or who have become distinguished by their eminence, talents, contributions, or other merits	None	
King's Service Order (Note: Previously called the Queen's Service Order. Redesignated on 3 May 2024.)	Companion (KSO)			13 March 1975	Elizabeth II	For service — Mō ngā mahi nui	For valuable voluntary service to the community or meritorious and faithful services to the Crown or similar services within the public sector, whether in elected or appointed office	King's Service Medal	
King's Service Medal (Note: Previously called the Queen's Service Medal. Redesignated on 3 May 2024.)	(KSM)			13 March 1975	Elizabeth II	For service — Mō ngā mahi nui	Voluntary service to the community or services to the Crown in the public sector, in elected or appointed office.		
New Zealand Antarctic Medal	(NZAM)			1 September 2006	Elizabeth II	None	For outstanding contribution to exploration, scientific research, conservation, environmental protection, or knowledge of the Antarctic region; or in support of New Zealand's objectives or operations, or both, in the Antarctic region.	None	
New Zealand Distinguished Service Decoration	(DSD)			14 May 2007	Elizabeth II	None	Distinguished military service, by regular, territorial and reserve members of the New Zealand Defence Force	None	
New Zealand Memorial Cross	—			12 September 1947	George VI	None	Next of kin of New Zealand service personnel who, since September 1939, have been killed on active service or later die of wounds	None	

- Orders. The Order of the Garter is the country's highest civilian honour, then the Order of the Thistle, then the Order of Merit, then the Order of New Zealand, then the New Zealand Order of Merit (with five levels), then the Royal Victorian Order (also with five levels). The King's Service Order has similar precedence to the fourth level of the New Zealand Order of Merit. The King's Service Medal takes precedence after the New Zealand Order of Merit. Prior to the reorganisation of the New Zealand honours system in 1996, New Zealanders received various British Imperial honours, namely peerages and baronetcies of the United Kingdom, the Order of the Bath, Order of St Michael and St George, Order of the British Empire, and Knight Bachelor.
- Other decorations and medals. These usually do not carry titles, but nonetheless entitle the holder to place post nominals after their name. The New Zealand Antarctic Medal and the Distinguished Service Decoration are analogues to the Polar Medal and the Medal of the Order of the British Empire. (See British and Commonwealth orders and decorations.)
- The Most Venerable Order of St John of Jerusalem (founded 1888). The Order is not technically a State Order or Royal Order, although the monarch is the Sovereign Head of the Order and the Governor-General of New Zealand is the Prior in New Zealand. It is, however, an official Order of Chivalry, being considered by DPMC as such. Membership of the Order confers official post-nominals commensurate with rank within the Order. The conferring of post-nominals in New Zealand is in contrast to other Priories where the Order's leadership in those nations prohibits its members to use post-nominals outside of internal Order business. The Order's members may wear its insignia, but do not enjoy de jure use of the title "Sir" associated with other Orders' levels of knighthood.
- Honours in the exclusive gift of the monarch such as the Order of the Garter, Order of the Thistle, Royal Victorian Order and Order of Merit are not conferred on ministerial advice and continue to be part of the New Zealand royal honours system.

== See also ==
- Orders, decorations, and medals of the Commonwealth realms
- Kīngitanga honours system
- New Zealand honours order of wearing
- New Zealand campaign medals
- New Zealand gallantry awards
- New Zealand bravery awards
- New Zealand Meritorious & Long Service Awards
- Niue National Awards
- Orders, decorations, and medals of the United Kingdom
- State decoration
- 2009 Special Honours
- Living New Zealand dames and knights
