= List of New Zealand businesspeople =

The following is a list of notable businesspeople from New Zealand.

== A ==
- Margaret Alcorn (1868–1967), interior designer and design store owner
- Mary Alcorn (1866–1928), interior designer and design store owner
- Sophia Anstice (1849–1926), dressmaker and draper
- Sir Ray Avery (born 1947), pharmaceutical scientist

== B ==
- Norah Barlow (born 1957), former chief executive of Summerset Group
- Samuel Brown (1845–1909), mayor of Wellington and merchant
- Alfred Buckland (1825–1903), auctioneer, farmer, businessman and landowner

== C ==
- Sir John Logan Campbell (1817–1912), merchant, local politician, businessman, philanthropist, the "father of Auckland"
- George Thomson Chapman (1824–1881), merchant, bookseller and publisher
- Percy Roderick Coleman (1897–1965), founder of Coleman motorcycle importing and distribution company
- Dame Trelise Cooper, fashion designer

== D ==
- Thomas Wong Doo (1903–1963), merchant, interpreter, community leader
- Rod Drury (born 1966), businessman
- Peri Drysdale (born 1953), founder of Untouched World and Snowy Peak clothing companies

== E ==
- Alfred Eady (1891–1965), music retailer, company director, benefactor
- Annie Elsom (1867–1962), florist

== F ==
- Sir Michael Fay (born 1949), merchant banker
- Josiah Firth (1826–1897), flourmiller, politician, pastoralist, entrepreneur
- Ted Firth (1905–1978), manufacturer, aviator, military leader; co-founder of Firth Concrete
- Tony Firth (1907–1980), manufacturer, aviator, military leader; co-founder of Firth Concrete
- Gregory Fortuin, businessman and Race Relations Conciliator (2001–2002)

== G ==
- Theresa Gattung, former chief executive of Telecom New Zealand (1993–2007)
- Elizabeth George (c.1814–1902), hotel owner

== H ==
- Bendix Hallenstein (1835–1905), clothing manufacturer and retailer, founder of Hallenstein Brothers and the D.I.C.
- Sir Jack Harris, 2nd Baronet (1906–2009), chief executive of Bing, Harris & Co.
- Graeme Hart (born 1955), New Zealand's richest businessman
- Murray Haszard (born 1954), entrepreneur and businessman
- Joseph Hatch (1837–1928), Invercargill businessman, "harvester" of penguins
- Keith Hay (1917–1997), builder, businessman, local politician, morals campaigner
- Harriet Heron (c.1836–1933), hotel owner
- Michael Hill (1938–2025), jeweller, businessman, golfer
- Dame Bronwen Holdsworth (born 1942), co-founder of Pultron Composites
- Dick Hubbard (born 1946), founder of Hubbards Foods and mayor of Auckland (2004–2007)
- Christopher Peter Huljich (born 1950), entrepreneur and philanthropist
- Michael Huljich (born 1957), entrepreneur and philanthropist
- Paul Huljich (born 1952), author, entrepreneur and philanthropist

== I ==
- Mary Jane Innes (1852–1941), brewery owner

== J ==
- Sir Robert Jones, property tycoon, founder of New Zealand Party

== K ==
- Henry Kelliher (1896–1991), businessman, publisher, art patron, credit reformer

== L ==
- Johannes La Grouw (1913–2011), OBE and Business Hall of Fame, entrepreneur, philanthropist, co-founder of a revolutionary construction system (Lockwood)
- Robert Laidlaw (1885–1971), retailer, founder of FTC, the Farmers Trading Company
- Thomson Leys (1850–1924), journalist, editor, newspaper proprietor, philanthropist
- Sir John Luke (1858–1931), businessman, politician

== M ==
- William Betts Mason (1865–1912), founder of W.B. Mason, born in New Zealand and emigrated to the US
- Flora MacKenzie (1902–1982), brothel owner and dressmaker
- Sir Roy McKenzie (1922–2007), retailer, philanthropist
- Sir James Mills (1847–1936), founder of the Union Company
- Jeremy Moon, businessman; founder of Icebreaker clothing
- Sam Morgan (born 1975), businessman; founder of Trade Me, an Internet-auction website
- Simon Moutter, engineer, businessman
- Nick Mowbray, businessman; co-founder of ZURU, a toy manufacturer
- Sir Arthur Myers (1867–1926), businessman, politician, philanthropist
- Douglas Myers (1938–2017), businessman, brewer

== N ==
- Joseph Nathan (1835–1912), manufacturer, founded Joseph Nathan & Co. and Glaxo
- Sir Charles Norwood (1871–1966), businessman, philanthropist

== P ==
- John Plimmer (1812–1905), businessman, has been called the "father of Wellington"

== R ==
- Thomas Russell (c. 1830–1904), lawyer, businessman, politician, financier, land speculator
- Sarah Robb O'Hagan (born 1972), business executive, author, former president of Gatorade and Equinox

== S ==
- Marianne Smith (1851–1938), businesswoman, founder of Smith & Caughey's, community worker, philanthropist
- Sir Dryden Spring (born 1939), businessman

== T ==
- Sir Angus Tait (1919–2007), businessman and electronics innovator
- Sir Ian Taylor (born 1950), IT and computer animation innovator
- Stephen Tindall (born 1951), retailer, founder of The Warehouse Group, a New Zealand department-store chain
- Matthew Tukaki (born 1974), businessman, ex-officio director of the United Nations Global Compact, CEO of the Sustain Group, a global social investment business

== V ==
- Edward Earle Vaile (1869–1956), real estate agent, farmer, philanthropist

== W ==
- Sir James Wallace (born 1937), businessman and arts patron
- Eric Watson (born 1959), businessman
- James Williamson (1814–1888), merchant, landowner, financier, speculator

== Y ==
- Jack Yan (born 1972), publisher, designer and businessman

== See also ==
- Lists of New Zealanders
