= Lists of New Zealanders =

The following are lists of New Zealanders.

== Academia ==
- List of New Zealand university leaders

== Actors ==
- List of New Zealand actors
- List of former child actors from New Zealand

== Architecture ==
- List of New Zealand architects

== Art ==
- List of New Zealand artists
- List of New Zealand women artists

== Broadcasters ==
- List of New Zealand broadcasters

== Business ==
- List of New Zealand businesspeople

== Craft, design and fashion ==
- List of New Zealand designers and artisans

== Film ==
- List of New Zealand film directors
- See also Actors

== Inventors ==
- List of New Zealand inventors

== Executed ==
- List of people executed in New Zealand

== Literary ==
- List of New Zealand poets
- List of New Zealand writers
- List of New Zealand women writers
- New Zealand blogosphere

== Māori ==
- Māori people
- List of Māori composers

== Medicine ==
- List of New Zealand doctors

== Military ==
- List of New Zealand military people
- List of World War II aces from New Zealand

== Music ==
- List of New Zealand musicians
- List of New Zealand composers

== Police ==
- List of New Zealand police officers killed in the line of duty

== Politics ==
- List of New Zealand politicians
- List of governors-general of New Zealand
- List of prime ministers of New Zealand
- List of prime ministers of New Zealand by place of birth
- Left-wing activists in New Zealand
- List of members of the New Zealand Parliament who died in office

== Religion ==
- Lists of New Zealand religious leaders
- Congregation of Christian Brothers in New Zealand
- List of New Zealand Catholics

== Science ==
- List of New Zealand scientists
- List of New Zealand women botanists

== Sports ==
- List of New Zealand sportspeople
- List of New Zealand double-international sportspeople
- New Zealand Olympic medallists
- List of New Zealand Twenty20 International cricketers
- List of New Zealand ODI cricketers
- List of New Zealand Test cricketers
- List of New Zealand international footballers
- List of New Zealand Kiwis representatives
- List of New Zealand national rugby union footballers

== By ethnicity or descent ==
- List of New Zealanders of Chinese descent
- List of New Zealanders of Italian descent
- List of Pakistani New Zealanders

== Other lists ==
- New Zealand Listener Power List
- New Zealand's Top 100 History Makers
- Notable Alumni of St Peter's College, Auckland
- List of former staff of St Peter's College, Auckland
- List of people on stamps of New Zealand
- List of South Islanders
- List of people by nationality
- List of New Zealand suffragists

== See also ==
- Lists of people by nationality
