= List of New Zealanders of Italian descent =

This is a list of notable New Zealanders of Italian descent:

== B ==
- Carlo Bergamini — sculptor

== C ==
- Liberato Cacace — professional football player
- Russell Crowe — actor

== D ==
- Brendon Diamanti — cricketer
- Kate De Goldi — writer
- Raf de Gregorio — professional football player

== L ==
- Annalie Longo — soccer player

== M ==
- Angela Marino — basketball player
- Aldo Miccio — basketball politician
- James Musa — footballer

== R ==
- Luke Romano — rugby union player
- Paolo Rotondo — artist
- Bartolomeo Russo — fisherman, horticulturist and farmer

== S ==
- Piri Sciascia — academic
- Josh Sole — rugby union player
- Raffaello Squarise — violinist, teacher, conductor, and composer

== V ==
- Daniel Vettori — cricketer

== W ==
- Carin Wilson — studio furniture maker

== See also ==
Italian New Zealanders
