= Italian New Zealanders =

New Zealander citizens of Italian descent

Italo-neozelandesi (Italian)

Total population
- c. 3,000 (by birth, 2018) c. 5,300 (by ancestry, 2018)

Regions with significant populations
- Wellington, Auckland, Nelson

Languages
- New Zealand English · Italian and Italian dialects

Religion
- Christianity (predominantly Roman Catholic)

Related ethnic groups
- Italians, Italian Australians, Italian Americans, Italian Canadians, Italian South Africans, Italian British

Italian New Zealanders (Italian: italo-neozelandesi) are New Zealand-born citizens who are fully or partially of Italian descent, whose ancestors were Italians who emigrated to New Zealand during the Italian diaspora, or Italian-born people in New Zealand.

== Demographics ==
Italians live in all regions of New Zealand, with the two most common regions being the Auckland region and the Wellington region. 80.7 percent of Italian New Zealanders live in the main urban areas, populations of 30,000 or more. Most Italians live in the North Island (83.5 percent) and the rest in the South Island (16.4 percent). The population increased by 21.8 percent between 2006 and 2013. The 2006 Census had counted 3,114 New Zealanders of Italian descent.

As of the 2013 Census, 1,464 speak Italian at home. English is the most widely spoken language by Italian New Zealanders, with 95.9% being able to speak the language.

As of 2016, there were 3,217 registered Italian citizens (including those with dual citizenship) living in New Zealand according to the Italian constitutional referendum, 2016.

As of 2018, there were 5,352 New Zealander of Italian descent, while there were 2,947 Italian citizens.

== Historical overview ==
=== The early years ===
Italians have been arriving in New Zealand in limited numbers since the middle of the 18th century. The first Italian to set foot on New Zealand soil was Antonio Ponto, in 1769. Ponto was part of the crew on Captain James Cook's ship, the Endeavour. Salvatore Cimino, who arrived in 1840, is thought to have been the first Italian to settle in Wellington. Nevertheless, it is only since 1860 that the country witnessed the arrival of a number of educated individuals who had left Italy for non-economic reasons, such as missionaries, musicians, artists, professionals and businesspeople. In December 1860, a small group of Franciscan priests from Italy came to New Zealand with Bishop Pompallier to set up a Catholic mission for Māori. It was not successful and in 1873, the priests left New Zealand.

The number of Italians who arrived in New Zealand remained small during the whole of the nineteenth century. The voyage was costly and complex, as no direct shipping link existed between the two countries until the late 1890s. The voyage took over two months before the opening of the Suez Canal in 1869. Italian migrants who intended to leave for New Zealand had to use German shipping lines that called at the ports of Genoa and Naples no more than once a month. Therefore, other overseas destinations such as The United States, Canada, Australia, Brazil, Argentina, The United Kingdom, The United Arab Emirates, and Singapore, proved to be much more attractive, thus allowing the establishment of migration patterns more quickly and drawing far greater numbers. The New Zealand gold rush of the 1860s attracted a group of Italians to New Zealand. When the gold rush ended, some of the Italians returned home to Italy, some migrated to Australia, while others looked for work in the cities.

The shape of New Zealand was used as a marketing tool to attract Italian migrants, with a 19th-century promoter of Italian immigration showing how New Zealand bears a resemblance to Italy, by turning it upside down with "the foot end facing up".

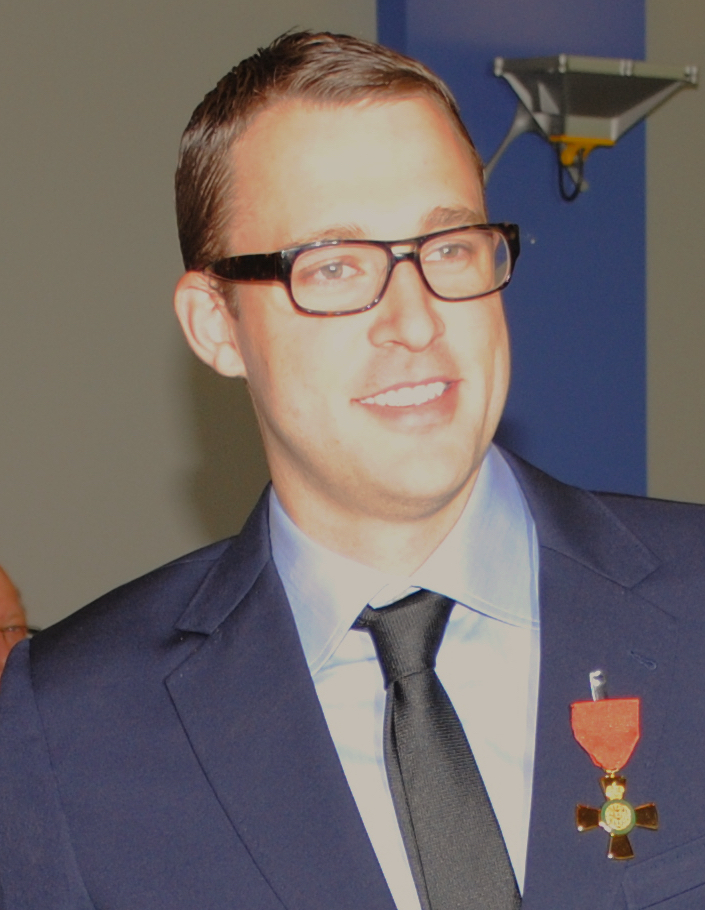
Daniel Vettori

During the 1870s, organised groups of Italian migrants arrived. These included a group of about 230 men of various occupations recruited by an agent in the Livorno area of northern Italy in 1875. On arrival in New Zealand, these men were assigned work they were often unsuited to, such as labouring on the Wairarapa railway. One group of Italians was sent to Jackson's Bay in Westland to grow grapes and mulberry trees, but this scheme was a failure as the weather was not suited to these crops. Some men arrived with their families, while others later sent for their wives and children to join them in what is referred to as chain migration.

=== Twentieth century ===
More waves of Italian immigrants arrived in the 20th century. By 1914, there were about 50 Italians from Massa Lubrense and Stromboli living at Eastbourne, mostly involved in fishing. From the 1920s a number of these fishermen moved to Island Bay in Wellington, where there was already an Italian presence from the nineteenth century migrations. In 1933 a fishing boat based in Island Bay was destroyed in a storm with the loss of four lives. Since then a ceremony by the Catholic church has been held each year to bless the boats, in a tradition dating back to southern Italy. Other Italians, many of whom came from Pistoia in Tuscany, took up market gardening in the Hutt Valley. The Italian market gardens in the Hutt Valley were almost all gone by the mid 1960s as land values rose and land was sold off for housing.

Between 1905 and 1930 an Italian community developed in Nelson, centred on market gardening. Most of these families came from southern Italy, from Sorrento, Massa Lubrense, S. Agata and Marina di Puolo. Crops included tomatoes and other vegetables including garlic, eggplants and capsicums. During World War 1 there was tension when "British" market gardeners in Nelson objected to having to do military service while "aliens" could stay home with their families.

During World War 2 Italian residents of New Zealand were considered "enemy aliens". Some were interned on Matiu / Somes Island, while others, whether naturalised New Zealanders or not, were required to register themselves at a police station under the Alien Control Emergency Regulations 1939.

A study of Italians living in New Zealand in 1968 found that over 90% of the 1550 Italian residents in New Zealand at that time (excluding tunnellers at Tongariro) had arrived via some form of chain migration, and that in some cases the link extended back 60 years. Almost all of them came from small towns and villages, and most had backgrounds as agricultural labourers, farmers, market gardeners or fishermen. Just under 10% of the Italian-born population in New Zealand in 1966 had arrived as Displaced Persons between 1950 and 1954. These people mostly came from Italian provinces ceded to Yugoslavia after World War 2.

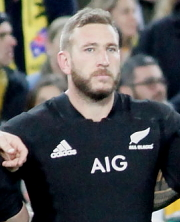
Luke Romano

Between 1967 and 1982 several hundred Italian hard-rock tunnellers came to Tūrangi to work on the Ministry of Works' Tongariro Power Development project, building tunnels and an underground power station. The men were contracted by Italian company Codelfa-Cogefar, which supplied accommodation in six camps near the works, medical services, a priest and Italian food and wine for the workers. Many of these men were from around Treviso in northern Italy where the company was based. Italian traditions such as a mass for Santa Barbara, patron saint of tunnellers and miners, were also acknowledged. When the project was completed some of the workers returned to Italy but others stayed in New Zealand. In 2017 a 50-year reunion for Codelfa-Cogefar employees was held in Tūrangi.

== Culture ==
Italians brought their language, food and customs with them to New Zealand. Club Garibaldi was established in Wellington in 1882 by Italian settlers, and is one of the oldest Italian clubs in the Southern Hemisphere. The club hosts activities such as social events, folk dancing and card games. In 1992, Club Garibaldi published a book about the Italian history of Wellington, titled Alla Fine Del Mondo – To the Ends of the Earth, authored by Paul Elenio. Also in Wellington, there is the Circolo Italiano di Wellington.

The Auckland Dante Alighieri Italian Society provides Italian language courses for people, cultural events, food, lectures and discussions, and a celebration of the Italian language and culture. The Festival Italiano is organized by the Dante Alighieri Society and is celebrated yearly in Auckland. The festival includes Italian food, drink, live music and entertainment.

In Nelson, Club Italia was formed in 1931 and hosts various social events and activities. Its mission is "to preserve and honour the culture, traditions and heritage of the Italian community and to maintain the historical facility as a functioning memorial to the working-class immigrants".

== Notable Italian New Zealanders ==
- Liberato Cacace, soccer player
- Umberto Calcinai, rugby union player
- Brendon Diamanti, cricketer
- Kate De Goldi, writer
- Raf de Gregorio, soccer player
- Luke Romano, rugby union player
- Paolo Rotondo, actor
- Ric Salizzo, broadcaster
- Daniel Vettori, cricketer

== See also ==
- European New Zealanders
- Europeans in Oceania
- Immigration to New Zealand
- Italian Australians
- Italian diaspora
- List of New Zealanders of Italian descent
- Pākehā
