= List of South Islanders =

This is a list of Famous South Islanders:

== A ==
- Alexander Aitken – mathematician/statistician, writer, mental calculator, musician
- Ronald Algie – politician
- Fred Allen – rugby union player
- James Allen – politician
- James Allen – rugby union player
- Rewi Alley – supporter of Chinese communism
- Peter Arnett – TV journalist, Pulitzer Prize winner
- Basil Arthur – politician
- Ian Athfield – architect

== B ==
- David Bain
- Alison Ballance – author and film-maker
- Rick Barker – politician
- James Baxter – poet
- Francis Bell – first New Zealand-born Prime Minister
- David Benson-Pope – politician
- Todd Blackadder – rugby player
- Ben Blair – rugby player
- William Brassington – stonemason and sculptor
- Kelly Brazier – rugby player
- John Britten – designer of the Britten motorcycle
- Donald Forrester Brown – awarded the Victoria Cross
- Nigel Brown – painter
- Gerry Brownlee – politician
- Kerry Burke – politician

== C ==
- Dan Carter – rugby player
- Nathan Cohen – world champion and Olympic champion rower
- Thomas Cooke – awarded the Victoria Cross
- Warren Cooper – politician
- Michael Cullen – politician
- G. H. Cunningham – plant pathologist
- Allen Curnow – poet

== D ==
- Alan Dale – actor
- Lianne Dalziel – politician
- Stephnie de Ruyter – politician
- Bob Deans – rugby union player
- Bruce Deans – rugby union player
- Robbie Deans – rugby player and coach
- Rod Dixon – runner
- Rod Donald – politician
- Sarah Dougherty – early settler
- Jimmy Duncan – rugby union player, coach and referee
- Peter Dunne – politician

== E ==
- Andy Ellis – rugby union player
- Thomas Ellison – rugby union player and lawyer
- Bill English – politician

== F ==
- Bob Fitzsimmons – world boxing heavyweight champion
- Corey Flynn – rugby player
- George Forbes – Prime Minister
- Tom Fyfe – mountaineer

== G ==
- George Gair – politician
- Daryl Gibson – rugby player
- Charles Gifford – teacher and very successful promoter of astronomy
- George Gillett – rugby union player
- Sir Harold Gillies – pioneering plastic surgeon
- Robin Gray – politician
- Arthur Guinness – politician
- Stewart Graeme Guthrie – police sergeant posthumously awarded the George Cross

== H ==
- Sir Richard Hadlee – cricketer
- John Hall – Premier of New Zealand
- William Hall-Jones – Prime Minister of New Zealand
- Adam Hamilton – politician
- Bill Hamilton – developed the modern jetboat
- Scott Hamilton – rugby union player
- Mark Hammett – rugby union player
- Dame Joan Hammond – violinist, soprano
- Joseph Hatch – Invercargill businessman, "harvester" of penguins
- Rudy Heeman – inventor
- Louise Henderson – painter
- Graham Henry – rugby union coach
- Jack Hinton – awarded the Victoria Cross
- Frances Hodgkins – painter
- Sidney Holland – Prime Minister
- Sir Fred Hollows – eye surgeon
- Andrew Hore – rugby union player
- Ned Hughes – rugby union player
- Alfred Hulme – awarded the Victoria Cross
- Denny Hulme – world champion racing driver

== J ==
- Chris Jack – rugby player
- Rowena Jackson – ballerina

== K ==
- Phil Keoghan – TV presenter
- Norman Kirk – Prime Minister
- Terry Knights – awarded the Military Cross for service in Iraq

== L ==
- Robert Lawson – architect
- Richard Loe – rugby player
- Jack Lovelock – runner
- Isaac Luck – architect
- Len Lye – sculptor, experimental film maker

== M ==
- Laurie Mains – rugby union player and coach
- Justin Marshall – rugby union player
- Aaron Mauger – rugby union player
- Ivan Mauger – six time Motorcycle speedway world champion
- Nathan Mauger – rugby union player
- Colin McCahon – painter, museum curator, teacher
- Richie McCaw – rugby union player
- Leon MacDonald – rugby union player
- Thomas Mackenzie – Prime Minister of New Zealand
- Shona McFarlane – painter
- Michael McGarry – football player
- Duncan McGregor – rugby union player
- Sir Archie McIndoe – pioneer plastic surgeon
- Cameron McIntyre – rugby player
- Peter McIntyre – painter
- Andrew Mehrtens – rugby union player
- Henry Monson – gaoler
- William Sefton Moorhouse – prominent Canterbury politician and settler
- Benjamin Mountfort – architect
- Burt Munro – speed record breaker
- Colin Murdoch – inventor of the disposable syringe

== N ==
- Edgar Neale – Mayor (1941–1945) and MP (1946–1957) for Nelson
- Henry James Nicholas – awarded the Victoria Cross
- Tane Norton – former All Black captain

== P ==
- Geoffrey Palmer – Prime Minister of New Zealand
- Richard Pearse – early aviator and inventor
- Francis Petre – architect

== R ==
- Bill Rowling – Prime Minister of New Zealand
- Bic Runga – singer, songwriter
- Ernest Rutherford – 1st Baron Rutherford of Nelson, scientist and winner of the 1908 Nobel Prize in Chemistry

== S ==
- Richard Seddon – Prime Minister of New Zealand
- George 'Johnny' Sellars – pioneering parachutist
- Henry Sewell – Premier of New Zealand
- Kate Sheppard – suffragist
- Jenny Shipley – New Zealand's first female prime minister
- Edward Stafford – Premier of New Zealand
- Billy Stead – rugby union player
- Robert Stout – Premier of New Zealand
- Grahame Sydney – painter

== T ==
- Sir Angus Tait – businessman and electronics innovator
- Brad Thorn – rugby union and rugby league player
- Reuben Thorne – rugby union player
- Richard Travis – awarded the Victoria Cross
- Brian Turner – poet
- Glenn Turner – cricketer
- Greg Turner – golfer

== U ==
- Charles Upham – World War II soldier (one of three awarded the Victoria Cross twice)

== V ==
- Petrus Van der Velden – painter
- Sir Julius Vogel – Premier of New Zealand

== W ==
- Miles Warren – architect
- Richard James Waugh – minister, historian, aviation chaplain and writer
- Robert Webster – discovered the link between human flu and bird flu
- Ian Wedde – poet
- Hayley Westenra – singer
- Tony Wilding – tennis player
- Geoff Williams – painter
- Jeff Wilson – sportsman
- Shelton Woolright – musician, best known as the drummer of Blindspott
- Alex Wyllie – rugby union player and coach
