= Ethel Jacobson =

Ethel Jacobson may refer to:

- Ethel Jacobson (American writer) (1899–1991), American writer of light verse and book reviewer
- Ethel Jacobson (New Zealand editor) (1877–1965), New Zealand newspaper editor
