= Jeffrey Williams =

Jeff or Jeffrey Williams may refer to:

== Entertainment ==
- Jeff Williams (actor), American actor
- Jeff Williams (musician) (born 1950), American jazz drummer
- Jeff Williams, soundtrack composer and musician for Red vs. Blue and RWBY
- Jeffery Lamar Williams, aka Young Thug (born 1991), rapper from Atlanta, Georgia
- J. Allen Williams (born 1960), American animator and writer

== Sports ==
- Jeff Williams (cyclist) (born 1958), British Olympic cyclist
- Jeff Williams (sprinter) (born 1965), American track and field athlete
- Jeff Williams (baseball) (born 1972), Australian baseball pitcher in the United States and Japan
- Jeff Williams (ice hockey) (born 1976), Canadian former professional ice hockey player
- Jeff Williams (tennis) (born 1978), American tennis player
- Jeff Williams (rugby union, born 1974), Canadian rugby union player
- Jeff Williams (rugby union, born 1988), South African rugby player
- Jeff Williams (offensive lineman), American football offensive lineman
- Jeff Williams (running back), American football running back
- Jeff Williams, American discus thrower, All-American for the Miami Hurricanes track and field team

== Other ==
- Jeffrey J. Williams (born 1958), American literary critic and cultural studies scholar
- Jeffrey Williams (astronaut) (born 1958), American astronaut
- Jeffrey Williams (fashion designer) (born 1984), American fashion designer
- Jeff Williams (poker player) (born 1986), American poker player
- Jeff Williams (Apple), Chief Operating Officer, Apple Inc.
- Jeff Williams (politician), mayor of Arlington, Texas
- Jeffrey L. Williams, arrested during the Ferguson unrest of March 2015
- Jeffrey S. Williams, writer, Civil War historian
- Jeffrey T. Williams, American ichthyologist

== See also ==
- Geoff Williams (disambiguation)
- Jeffery Williams (1920–2011), Canadian military officer
- Jeffery Allen Williams (born 1960), American animator
- Jeffery–Williams Prize, a mathematics award
