= RAF Ludford Magna =

Former RAF station in Lincolnshire, England

RAF Ludford Magna
- Ludford, Lincolnshire in England
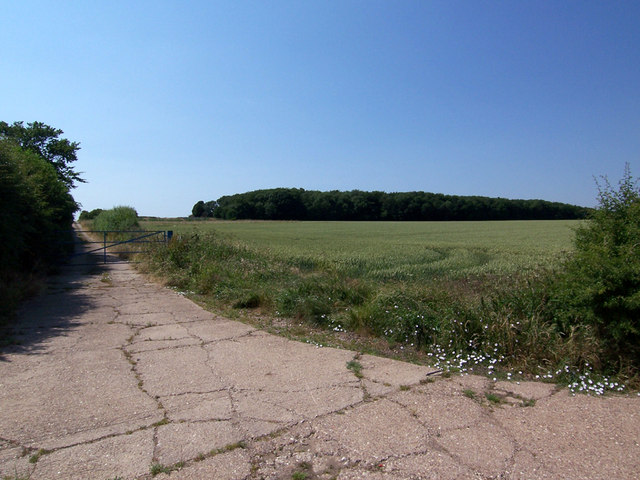
- A stretch of original perimeter track still standing at Ludford Magna

Site information
- Type: Royal Air Force station 14 Base HQ (1943–5)
- Code: LM
- Owner: Ministry of Defence
- Operator: Royal Air Force
- Controlled by: RAF Bomber Command * No. 1 Group RAF
- Condition: Dismantled. Former runways visible as cropmarks. Three Thor launchpads still stand at the centre of the airfield, although the brick structures have been dismantled.

Location
- Shown within Lincolnshire RAF Ludford Magna (the United Kingdom)
- Coordinates: 53.3737874°N 0.1926533°W

Site history
- Built: 1942/43
- Built by: George Wimpey & Co Ltd
- In use: June 1943 – October 1945; July 1958 – May 1963
- Materials: Concrete runways and perimeter tracks. Most buildings were of the temporary Nissen hut type
- Battles/wars: European theatre of World War II * Battle of the Ruhr * Battle of Berlin; Cold War

Garrison information
- Occupants: No. 101 Squadron RAF; No. 104 Squadron RAF (1958–63)

Airfield information
- Elevation: 130 metres (427 ft) AMSL
Runways
Direction	Length and surface
00/00	Concrete
00/00	Concrete
00/00	Concrete

Royal Air Force Ludford Magna or more simply RAF Ludford Magna is a former Royal Air Force station located on agricultural farmland immediately south of the village of Ludford, Lincolnshire and was sited 21.4 miles (34.4 km) north east of the county town of Lincoln, Lincolnshire, England.

The airfield was operated by RAF Bomber Command during the Second World War and the Cold War with it being used for Avro Lancaster bomber operations in the latter part of the Second World War the station was placed on care and maintenance until the mid-1950s when it was reactivated as a Cold War base for PGM-17 Thor intermediate range ballistic missiles (IRBMs). The station closed in the early part of the 1960s and has been mostly dismantled and returned to agricultural uses.

The remains of the station can be seen from the B1225 Caistor High Street, and the long-distance footpath the Viking Way passes right next to the eastern perimeter track.

== History ==
The station was constructed by George Wimpey with concrete runways on a 650-acre (260 ha) site in June 1943, on the site of High Fields Farm, and originally assigned to No. 1 Group RAF, headquartered at RAF Bawtry. It was the highest bomber airfield in England at 428 feet (130 m) above sea level, and cost £803,000.

No. 101 Squadron RAF arrived on 15 June 1943 from RAF Holme-on-Spalding Moor and was declared operational three days later on 18 June. The squadron remained the primary occupants during the Second World War.

Ludford Magna was the first airfield in 1 Group to be equipped with the experimental Fog Investigation and Dispersal Operation (FIDO) dispersal system, first used on 10 March 1944, as one of only fifteen RAF stations to be equipped with the pyrotechnic fog landing system in the UK. Six T2 and one B1 hangars were eventually erected on the airfield. There were three concrete runways, one north–south main at 2,000 yards (1,830 m) and two 1,400-yard (1,280 m) runways in a standard triangular layout.

The station's main gate was on Sixhills Lane. Due to the condition and poor drainage of the airfield it quickly acquired the nickname Mudford Magna. It had accommodation for 1,953 male and 305 female personnel, although the accommodation sites were situated north of the village and widely dispersed on various agricultural fields. The station technical site was located on the north western edge of the station. Bombs for Ludford Magna's Lancasters and for many other local airfields' planes, were supplied from No. 233 Maintenance Unit RAF at RAF Market Stainton. The airfield's bombs were stored widely spaced along the edge of Caistor High Street to avoid a sequence of detonation if the base was attacked or sabotaged. Its two satellite airfields were RAF Wickenby and RAF Faldingworth, each the other side of Market Rasen, with all three airfields part of No. 14 Base from 16 December 1943, although the base operations began on 20 January 1944.

It was planned to base No. 576 Squadron RAF at the airfield, with crews drawn from No. 101 Squadron and No. 103 Squadron RAF, but in November 1943 more suitable facilities were located at RAF Elsham Wolds.

=== Flying operations ===
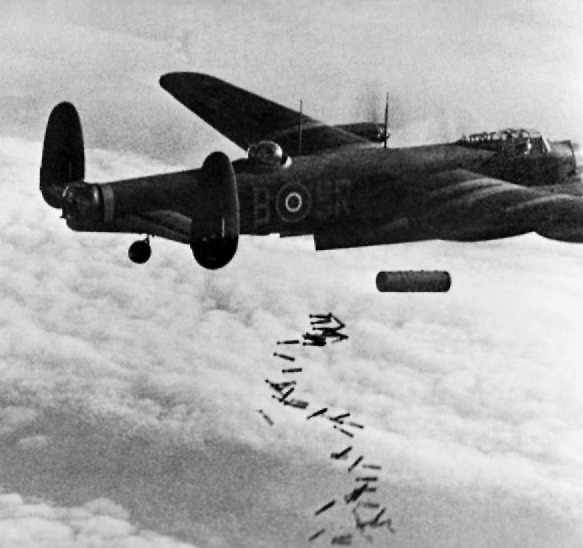
Lancaster NG128 of 101 Sqn from Ludford Magna dropping a Cookie over Duisburg on 14 October 1944

The first operation was on the night of 21 June 1943, with a raid on Krefeld in North Rhine-Westphalia, with the first of many Lancasters (ED650) from the base not to return home, crashing near Mönchengladbach. During the war a total of 113 Avro Lancasters from the base failed to return, the highest number from any single squadron.

No. 101 Squadron were the main providers of electronic jamming equipment for raids over Germany, using Monica from July 1943 in three of their Lancasters, then Airborne Cigar (ABC) later in 1943. ABC involved German-speaking operators to misguide Luftwaffe nightfighters by transmitting Merlin-engine noise on three relevant Luftwaffe communication radio frequencies simultaneously over a distance of 50 miles. It was first used on the night of 7 October 1943 over Stuttgart in a raid with 343 Lancasters.

In the autumn of 1944, 101 Squadron was the first in the RAF to use the Village Inn Automatic Gun-Laying Turret. From October 1944 No. 100 Group RAF, stationed in Norfolk, took over most of the electronic jamming role. On 4 March 1945 it suffered its first attack from enemy bombers.

On 10 February 1945, 101 Squadron took delivery of an ABC-equipped Avro Lancaster PA237. Less than two weeks later, on the evening of 23 February 1945, the aircraft was one of 368 Lancasters and 13 Mosquitoes to take part in a raid on Pforzheim in Germany, home to watchmaking and jewellery trades whose precision skills were thought to be contributing to the Nazi war effort. ABC-equipped Lancasters had distinctively large aerials so were key targets of Luftwaffe crews as a result. PA237 was one of 12 Lancasters shot down during the raid; the young crew of 7 are buried at the Commonwealth War Graves Cemetery in Durnbach, near Bad Tölz, south of Munich.

=== Fog dispersal system ===
Ludford Magna was one of a small number of RAF stations equipped with an early experimental Fog Investigation and Dispersal Operation (FIDO) system. The station was provided with seven large fuel tanks, which pumped petrol into two large pipes running up either side one of their runways. Once the open flame burners along the length of the main runway were ignited the intense rising heat would lift and disperse the fog leaving a visually clear and illuminated runway.

Not all RAF stations were FIDO equipped and when dense fog affected the county it was not unknown for aircraft from several stations to be diverted to RAF Ludford Magna for a safe landing, returning to their home stations when the foggy weather cleared. Volunteer observers at the surrounding Royal Observer Corps posts were specially trained and provided with coloured rocket flares (code named Granite) to guide any aircraft lost in thick fog towards the limited number of FIDO equipped stations.

The only other airfields in Lincolnshire fitted with FIDO systems were RAF Fiskerton, RAF Metheringham and RAF Sturgate and there were only 15 FIDO stations in the UK, mostly on the east coast.

=== Post-war use ===
After the war some of the station's buildings were used to house 800 Polish refugees between 1948 and 1956.

=== Cold War ===
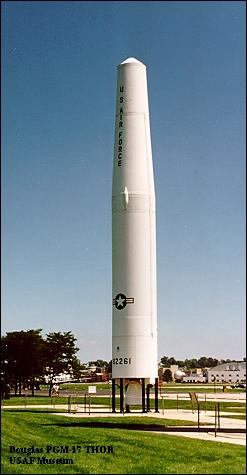
PGM-17 Thor missile

In January 1956 RAF Hemswell just north of Lincoln was established as an RAF Bomber Command missile unit, maintaining and operating nine mobile mounted PGM-17 Thor Intermediate Range Ballistic Nuclear Missile launchers of No. 97(Strategic Missile) Squadron RAF. Each missile with a range of 1,500 miles (2,400 km) was tipped with a 1.44 megaton nuclear warhead, jointly controlled by the Royal Air Force and the United States Air Force under the so-called "dual-key arrangements".

In 1959 RAF Hemswell became the headquarters for the "No. 5 (Lincolnshire) Missile Dispersal Sites" located at RAF Bardney, RAF Caistor, RAF Coleby Grange and RAF Ludford Magna. The missiles at Ludford Magna were maintained and operated by No. 104 Squadron RAF.

The Cuban Missile Crisis brought the entire UK based Thor missile force to maximum strategic alert and readiness for a ten-day period during October and November 1962. On 26 October 1962 the NATO alert level was raised to DEFCON 2 and the missiles were made ready for launching, on a phased-hold leaving the missiles eight minutes from launch in the vertical unfuelled condition or two minutes from launch in the fuelled position. Local residents can remember the Ludford Magna missiles stood erect and ready to fire on their mobile launchers. Politically the following day came to be referred to as "Black Saturday" and was very tense until a negotiated stand-down by both sides was reached.

Former Group Captain George Aylett revealed that a potential disaster occurred on 7 December 1960 at RAF Ludford Magna. The RAF technicians fuelling the missile allowed its liquid oxygen tank to empty on to the launch pad. The leak could have caused a major fire leading to detonation of the rocket's fuel. "It could have created a terrible disaster," Group Captain Aylett said. A specialist on nuclear weapon accidents at Bradford University said that the destruction of the warhead would have contaminated between 100 and 300 square miles (260 and 780 km^{2}).

=== Decommissioning ===
The brick built accommodation buildings were sold in a public auction on 22 July 1964. On 19 October 1965, the remaining 505 acres (204 ha) were sold to local farmers and some temporary buildings were demolished while others have fallen into disrepair or have been adapted for other uses. Parts of the runway perimeter and the three Thor missile launchpads still remain, as do most of the accommodation buildings north of the village. In 1978 a war memorial was erected in the village.

== Station commanders ==
- Group Captain R S Blucke, June 1943 - 31 December 1943
- Group Captain B J R King, 1 January 1944 – 1945
- Group Captain G Aylett, 1959–1963

== Squadrons based at Ludford Magna ==
- No. 101 Squadron RAF 15 June 1943 – 1 October 1945
- No. 104 Squadron RAF 22 July 1958 – 24 May 1963

=== Airfield protection squadrons ===
- No. 2706 Squadron RAF Regiment June 1943 - November 1943
- No. 2702 Squadron RAF Regiment November 1943 - October 1945

== See also ==
- List of World War II electronic warfare equipment
- Telecommunications Research Establishment
- Flensburg radar detector
- No. 100 Group RAF
