= Geoff Williams =

Geoff Williams may refer to:

- Geoff Williams (footballer) (1930–2020), Australian rules footballer
- Geoff Williams (painter) (born 1957), New Zealand contemporary realist artist
- Geoff Williams (squash player) (born 1957), British squash player

== See also ==
- Jeffrey Williams (disambiguation)
- Geoffrey Williams (born 1963), English singer-songwriter
