= List of Pakistani New Zealanders =

This is a list of Pakistani New Zealanders. It includes New Zealand citizens and permanent residents of Pakistani ancestry, Pakistani-born immigrants who moved to New Zealand and were naturalised with New Zealand citizenship, as well as expatriates who are known to have resided in New Zealand. The list is sorted alphabetically by the individuals' profession or field of activity to which they have notably made contributions, such as early history, politics, and sports.

== Early history ==
- Abraham Salaman, one of the first Punjabi Muslims from British India who arrived in New Zealand, in 1903, becoming a notable herbalist and merchant.

== Politics ==
- Ashraf Choudhary, Pakistani-born New Zealand politician, former Labour member of the New Zealand Parliament, agricultural engineer; first Muslim and South Asian-origin MP in the country.
- Asim Mukhtar, Pakistani-born New Zealand community leader who has won the Muslim New Zealander of the Year 2019 award. He is elected vice president of the Pakistan Association of New Zealand. He is an Influencer who also works with media to represent the Pakistani community in New Zealand.
- Dail Jones, Pakistan-born New Zealand politician, former National Party and New Zealand First member of the New Zealand Parliament; moved to New Zealand in 1959.

== Sports ==
- Azhar Abbas, Pakistani first-class cricketer in New Zealand.
- Kassem Ibadulla, New Zealand cricketer; son of Khalid Ibadullah.
- Khalid Ibadulla, former Pakistani cricketer; moved to New Zealand in 1976, becoming a cricket coach and commentator.
- Jan Khan, New Zealand lawn bowler; sister of Marina Khan.
- Marina Khan, New Zealand lawn bowler; sister of Jan Khan.
- Kashif Shuja, Pakistani-born New Zealand squash player.
- Omar Slaimankhel, Pakistan-born New Zealand rugby footballer of Afghan origin; New Zealand Warriors and Sydney Roosters player.
- Mohammad Wasim, former Pakistani cricketer, played first-class cricket in New Zealand.

== See also ==
- Lists of New Zealanders
- List of Pakistanis
