= List of New Zealand doctors =

The following is a list of notable medical doctors from New Zealand.

- Louis Barnett – surgeon
- Sir Brian Barratt-Boyes – cardiac surgeon
- Agnes Bennett – doctor and medical officer in World War I
- John Daniel Bergin – neurologist
- Alice Bush – doctor, paediatrician and campaigner for family planning services and abortion access
- Margaret Cruickshank – first registered female doctor in New Zealand
- Sylvia Gytha de Lancey Chapman – medical superintendent
- Charles Farthing – pioneer in the treatment of AIDS
- Isaac Featherston – politician
- Erich Geiringer – founder of the New Zealand Medical Association
- David Gerrard – swimmer, Professor of Sports Medicine at University of Otago Dunedin School of Medicine. Former New Zealand Olympic chef de mission
- Sir Harold Gillies – pioneering plastic surgeon
- Felicity Goodyear-Smith – doctor and medical academic at the University of Auckland
- Herb Green – specialist at the centre of the Cartwright Inquiry
- Elizabeth Gunn – doctor and founder of the Children's Health Camp movement
- Ian Hassall – paediatrician
- Te Rangi Hīroa (also known as Sir Peter Henry Buck) – member of the Ngāti Mutunga Māori iwi
- Fred Hollows – ophthalmologist
- Paul Hutchison – politician
- Tracy Inglis – Auckland medical practitioner
- Julian Jack – physiologist
- Sir Truby King – child-care pioneer
- Ivan Lichter – thoracic surgeon
- Sir Robert Macintosh – pioneering anaesthetist
- Sir Archibald McIndoe – pioneering plastic surgeon
- Brad McKay – doctor, author and television personality
- Rainsford Mowlem – pioneering plastic surgeon
- Courtney Nedwill – doctor and public health officer
- James Newman (geriatrician) – geriatrician and medical superintendent
- Thomas Moore Philson – doctor and hospital superintendent
- Cecily Pickerill – plastic surgeon
- Sir Henry Pickerill – plastic surgeon
- Denis Rogers – local-body politician
- Sir Edward Sayers – Methodist missionary; military medical administrator; consultant physician, then Dean, of the University of Otago Dunedin School of Medicine
- Jessie Scott – notable New Zealand doctor, medical officer and prisoner of war.
- Emily Siedeberg – doctor, hospital superintendent and first female medical graduate in New Zealand
- Ebenezer Teichelmann – surgeon, mountaineer and photographer
- Henry Thacker – Member of Parliament and Mayor of Christchurch
- Ronald Trubuhovich – pioneer in critical-care medicine
- Thomas Valintine – doctor and public health administrator
- Leslie Whetter – surgeon and Antarctic explorer
- Christine Coe Winterbourn – Professor of Pathology at the University of Otago

== See also ==
- Lists of New Zealanders
- List of physicians
