= George Stacey Hodson =

Royal Air Force Air Vice-Marshal (1899-1976)

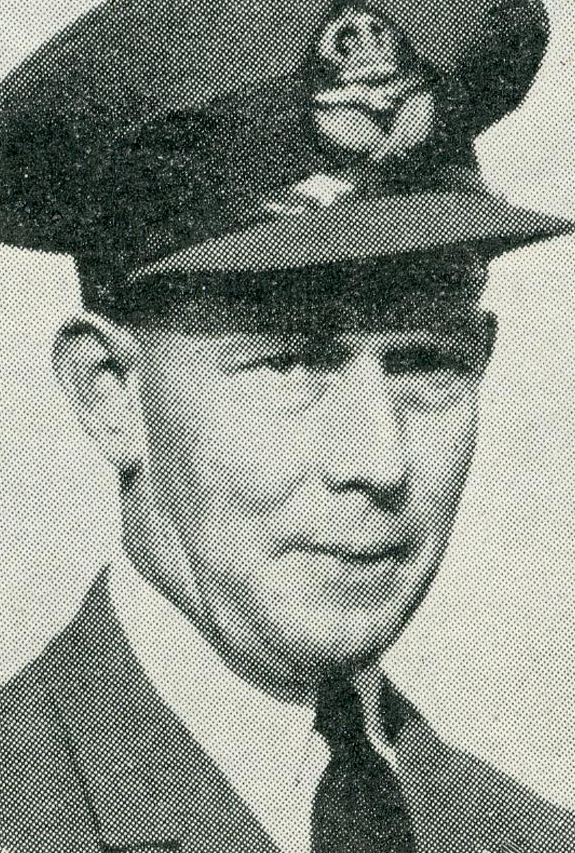
- Born: 2 May 1899; Belmont, Surrey, England
- Died: 1 October 1976 (aged 77); Bognor Regis, West Sussex, England
- Military career
- Allegiance: United Kingdom
- Branch: British Army; Royal Air Force
- Rank: Air Vice Marshal
- Units: No. 73 Squadron RFC; No. 213 Squadron RAF; No. 1 Flying Training School; No. 55 Squadron RAF; No. 4 Flying Training School; No. 5 Flying Training School; No. 58 Squadron RAF; No. 602 (City of Glasgow) Squadron AAF; No. 11 Flying Training School
- Commands: RNZAF Wigram; No. 44 Base, RAF Holme-on-Spalding Moor; No. 93 Group RAF; No. 92 Group RAF; No. 205 Group RAF
- Conflicts: World War I; Western Front; World War II
- Awards: Order of the Bath; Order of the British Empire; Air Force Cross; Croix de guerre (Belgium)

Air Vice Marshal George Stacey Hodson CB, CBE, AFC, (2 May 1899 – 1 October 1976) was an air officer of the British Royal Air Force who began his military career as a World War I flying ace credited with ten aerial victories. In the course of his 34 years service, he rose to become a major commander during World War II.

== Early life ==
Hodson was born in Belmont, Surrey, and was educated at Dulwich College.

== World War I ==
Hodson was commissioned as a probationary temporary second lieutenant on the General List for service in the Royal Flying Corps on 9 September 1917. Upon completion of his training, on 28 October 1917, he was confirmed in his rank and posted to No. 73 Squadron RFC. Flying a Sopwith Camel single seat fighter, he gained his first four aerial victories between 10 and 31 March 1918. The day after his fourth victory, 1 April 1918, the Army's Royal Flying Corps was merged with the Royal Naval Air Service to form the Royal Air Force, and Hodson was promoted to lieutenant. Hodson was then posted back to England to serve as an instructor, finally returning to France to serve in No. 213 Squadron RAF in August 1918, and gaining six more victories between 18 September and 14 October 1918, including three aircraft in a single day.

In recognition of his war-time service Hodson was awarded the Air Force Cross on 3 June 1919, and on 15 July 1919 was awarded the Croix de guerre by the Kingdom of Belgium.

=== List of aerial victories ===
Combat record
No.	Date/Time	Aircraft/ Serial No.	Opponent	Result	Location	Notes
No. 73 Squadron RFC
1	10 March 1918 @ 1425	Sopwith Camel (B7291)	Fokker Dr.I	Destroyed by fire	West of Bohain-en-Vermandois, France	
2	13 March 1918 @ 1015	Sopwith Camel (B7291)	Albatros D.V	Destroyed by fire	Wambaix, France	
3	22 March 1918 @ 1505	Sopwith Camel (B7282)	Albatros D.V	Driven down out of control	Marteville, France	
4	31 March 1918 @ 1000	Sopwith Camel (C8292)	Albatros D.V	Destroyed by fire	Abancourt-Warfusée, France	
No. 213 Squadron RAF
5	18 September 1918 @ 1050	Sopwith Camel (D3341)	Observation balloon	Destroyed	La Barrière, Belgium	Shared with Lieutenants David Ingalls and Harry Coleman Smith.
6	24 September 1918 @ 1450–1455	Sopwith Camel (D3341)	Fokker D.VII	Driven down out of control	Southwest of Torhout, Belgium	
7	24 September 1918 @ 1450–1455	Sopwith Camel (D3341)	Fokker D.VII	Destroyed	1 mile west of Mitswege, Belgium	
8	24 September 1918 @ 1730	Sopwith Camel (D3341)	Rumpler reconnaissance aircraft	Destroyed by fire	Sint-Pieters-Kapelle, Belgium	Shared with Lieutenant David Ingalls.
9	4 October 1918 @ 1555	Sopwith Camel (F3965)	Fokker D.VII	Destroyed	South of Roulers, Belgium	
10	14 October 1918 @ 1430	Sopwith Camel (D3400)	Fokker D.VII	Destroyed	Beerst, Belgium	

== Inter-war career ==
In March 1919 Hodson was posted to No. 11 Aircraft Park. On 1 August 1919 he was promoted to flying officer, and on 24 October was granted a short service commission. Hodson was assigned to the Care and Maintenance Party at RAF Norwich, and on 1 April 1920 was assigned to the same duty at RAF Lincoln. On 17 December 1920 his commission was made permanent. He was posted to No. 1 Flying Training School on 15 March 1921, and 14 September 1923 to No. 55 Squadron, based in Iraq.

He was promoted to flight lieutenant on 1 July 1925, and posted to No. 4 Flying Training School, Egypt, on 17 October. He finally returned to the UK, being assigned as a supernumerary at the RAF Depot on 14 February 1928, and on 30 July was posted to No. 5 Flying Training School, RAF Sealand. On 21 February 1931 he was posted to No. 58 Squadron, based at RAF Worthy Down, as a flight commander, and on 7 October to No. 602 (City of Glasgow) Squadron, Auxiliary Air Force, to serve as adjutant and instructor.

On 1 August 1935 Hodson was promoted to squadron leader, and on 1 October he was appointed Chief Flying Instructor at No. 11 Flying Training School, RAF Wittering. On 24 February 1938 Hodson began an exchange posting with the Royal New Zealand Air Force, and in April 1938 took command of RNZAF Wigram, near Christchurch, New Zealand. On 1 July 1938 he was promoted to wing commander.

== World War II ==
Hodson remained in New Zealand after the outbreak of the war. His exchange posting with the Royal New Zealand Air Force was altered to special duty on 6 April 1940, and on 1 December 1940 he was promoted to the temporary rank of group captain. He eventually left Wigram in June 1942, and in recognition of his efforts was made a Commander of the Order of the British Empire in the King's Birthday Honours the same month.

On 1 November 1942 he was appointed acting air commodore, and on 1 May 1943 was promoted to the war substantive rank of group captain, becoming Air Officer Commanding, No. 44 Base, RAF Holme-on-Spalding Moor the same day. On 1 December 1943 he was appointed a temporary air commodore, and acting air vice marshal on 9 August 1944, to take the position of AOC, No. 93 Group RAF. He was confirmed in his rank of as group captain on 23 January 1945 with seniority from 1 June 1944, and on 23 February was appointed AOC, No. 92 Group RAF. On 9 August 1945 he was awarded the war substantive rank of air commodore, to become Air Officer Training at the Headquarters of Bomber Command. He finally relinquished his appointment as acting air vice marshal on 1 September 1945.

== Postwar career ==
In the 1946 New Year Honours, Hodson was made a Companion of the Order of the Bath. On 1 April he was appointed Air Officer in Charge of Administration at the Headquarters of Coastal Command. On 19 January 1947 he was again appointed acting air vice marshal, and on 1 February was appointed AOC, No. 205 Group RAF. During this posting, he was in charge of relocating airfields in Egypt from the Nile Delta south along the shores of the Suez Canal. His headquarters switched from RAF Heliopolis to RAF Fayid, even as No. 205 Squadron was stripped of its Lancasters. They were replaced by rotating detachments of Lincolns from Bomber Command. On 1 July 1947 he was promoted to air commodore. On 30 December 1949 he was appointed Senior Air Staff Officer at the Headquarters of Reserve Command, receiving promotion to air vice marshal on 1 January 1950. He became the Senior Air Staff Officer at the Headquarters of Home Command on 1 August 1950. Hodson finally retired from Royal Air Force on 7 September 1951.

He died in Bognor Regis in 1976.
