= List of New Zealand film directors =

The following is a list of New Zealand film directors and producers.

- Andrew Adamson
- Ant Timpson
- Barry Barclay – produced the first feature made by an indigenous person anywhere in the world
- Pietra Brettkelly – award-winning documentary filmmaker, part of the Academy of Motion Picture Arts and Sciences, named an Arts Laureate of New Zealand
- Martin Campbell
- Jane Campion
- Niki Caro
- Winston Cowie
- Max Currie
- Jordan Dodson
- Roger Donaldson (born in Australia)
- Cameron Duncan
- Toa Fraser
- Alex Galvin
- Ainsley Gardiner
- Briar Grace-Smith
- Libby Hakaraia
- Ben Hawker
- Rudall Hayward – pioneer filmmaker
- Jason Lei Howden
- Sir Peter Jackson
- Christine Jeffs
- Rupert Julian, aka Percival Hayes – New Zealand's first Hollywood actor, director during the silent era
- Paul Maunder
- Brad McGann
- Danny Mulheron
- Geoff Murphy
- Andrew Niccol – film director, screenwriter
- John O'Shea
- April Phillips
- Gaylene Preston
- Christian Rivers
- James Napier Robertson
- Tom Sainsbury
- Robert Sarkies
- David Sims
- Jason Stutter
- Lee Tamahori
- Ant Timpson
- Taika Waititi (Taika Cohen)
- Vincent Ward
- Peter Wells – author and film director
- Mika X
