= New Zealand Medical Association =

New Zealand medical association (1886–2022)

- Founded: 1886
- Dissolved: 2022
- Headquarters: Wellington, New Zealand
- Region served: New Zealand
- Website: www.nzma.org.nz

The New Zealand Medical Association (NZMA) was an association representing some doctors and medical students in New Zealand. It was officially founded after a meeting in April 1886 at Dunedin Hospital. From 1896 to 1967, the NZMA was considered as a branch of the British Medical Association and was known as the New Zealand Branch of the British Medical Association well into the 1970s. In the 1960s, Erich Geiringer, who was in conflict with the association, exploited the potential for confusion by founding the New Zealand Medical Association (since this name was officially free). Geiringer's NZMA included a number of progressive physicians and was very involved in political debates.

The NZMA was part of the World Medical Association and published The New Zealand Medical Journal (NZMJ).

In May 2022, the Board of the NZMA recommended to members that at a meeting on 30 May 2022, they should vote to liquidate the association, because of long-standing financial difficulties caused by falling support. On 30 May the members voted to liquidate. Publication of the NZMJ was taken over by the Pasifika Medical Association Group.

== See also ==
- List of New Zealand doctors
- Health care in New Zealand
- Medical Council of New Zealand
