= 1942 Birthday Honours (New Zealand) =

Awards list for New Zealand

The 1942 King's Birthday Honours in New Zealand, celebrating the official birthday of King George VI, were appointments made by the King to various orders and honours. The awards were made in recognition of war service by New Zealanders and were announced on 11 June 1942. No civilian awards were made.

The recipients of honours are displayed here as they were styled before their new honour.

== Order of the Bath ==
=== Companion (CB) ===
Military division, additional

- Lieutenant-General Edward Puttick DSO – Staff Corps, New Zealand Military Forces; of Wellington.
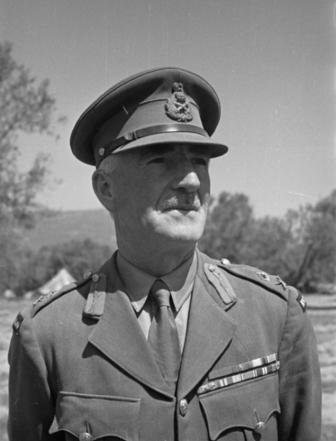
Edward Puttick

== Order of the British Empire ==
=== Commander (CBE) ===
Military division, additional

- Group Captain George Stacey Hodson AFC – Royal New Zealand Air Force; of Christchurch.
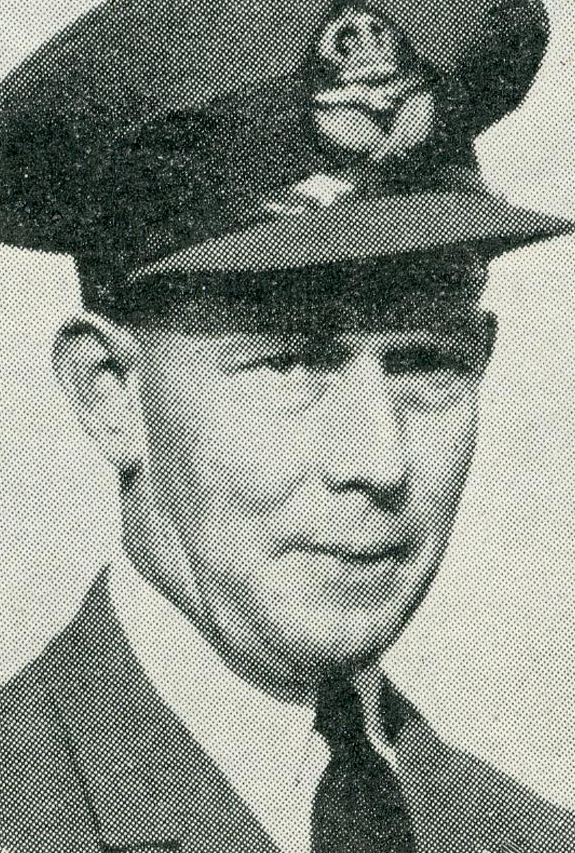
George Hodson

=== Officer (OBE) ===
Military division, additional

- Lieutenant-Commander Richard James Bailey – Royal Navy.
- Major (temporary Lieutenant-Colonel) Edgar Ravenswood McKillop – New Zealand Military Forces; of Wellington.
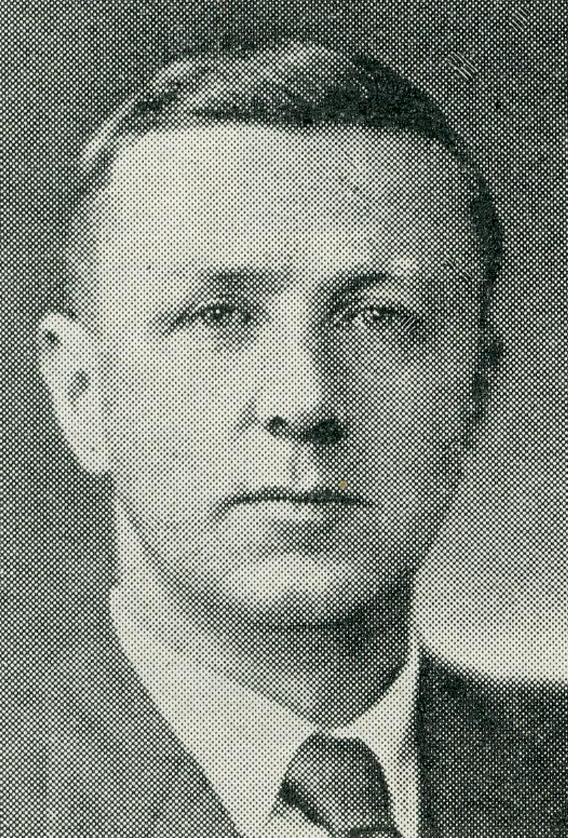
Edgar McKillop

=== Member (MBE) ===
Military division, additional

- Flight Lieutenant Donald Edward Grigg – Royal New Zealand Air Force; of Auckland.
- Lieutenant and Quartermaster (temporary Captain and Quartermaster) Thomas Alexander Stewart McKenzie – Permanent Staff, New Zealand Military Forces; of Christchurch.
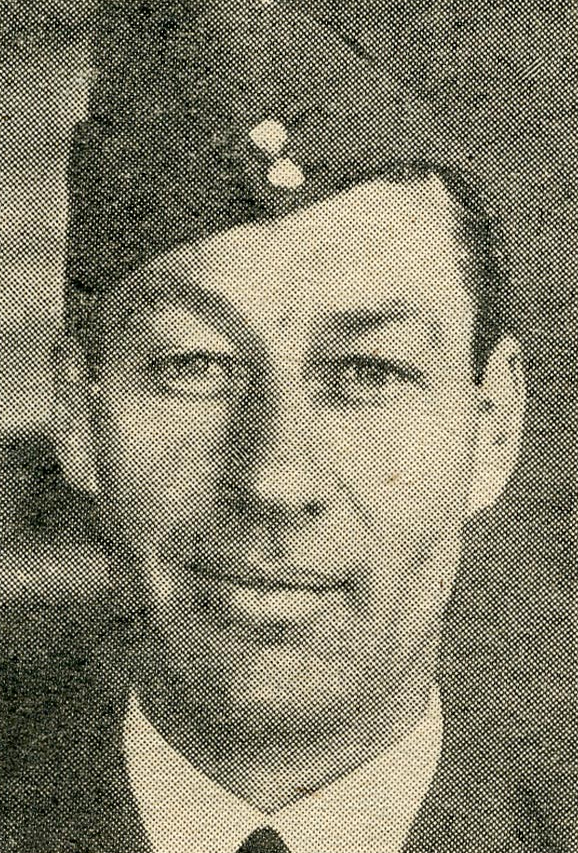
Donald Grigg

== British Empire Medal (BEM) ==
Military division

- Chief Stoker Herbert Frederick McKain – Royal New Zealand Navy.
- Supply Chief Petty Officer John Francis Whitehead – Royal New Zealand Navy.

== Distinguished Service Cross (DSC) ==
- Lieutenant-Commander Gordon Bridson – Royal New Zealand Naval Volunteer Reserve.
- Lieutenant-Commander John George Hilliard – Royal New Zealand Naval Volunteer Reserve.
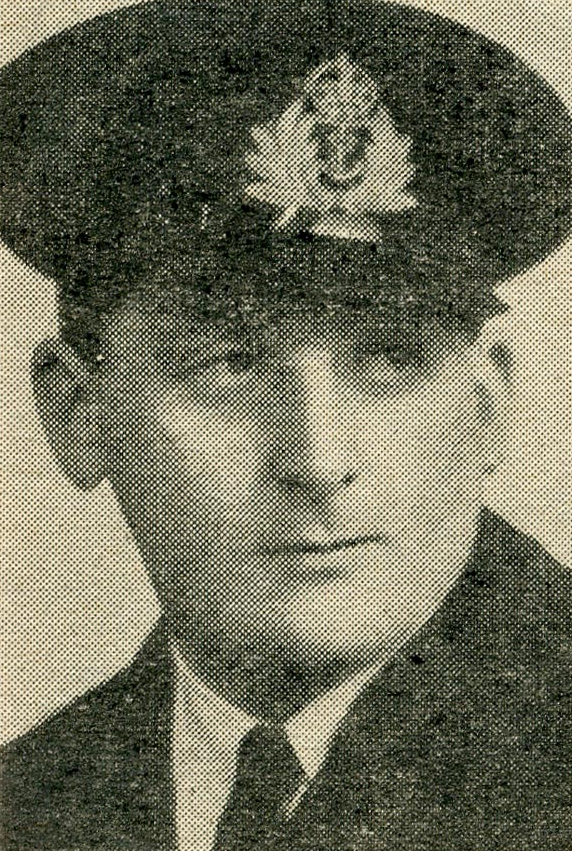
Gordon Bridson

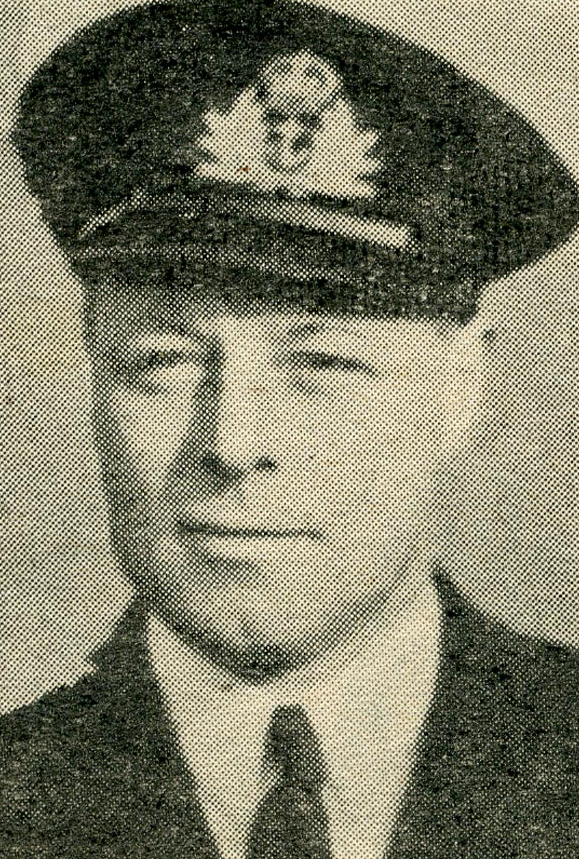
Jack Hilliard

== Air Force Cross (AFC) ==
- Wing Commander Donald William Baird – Royal New Zealand Air Force.
- Flight Lieutenant Edward Buckland Firth – Royal New Zealand Air Force; of Blenheim.
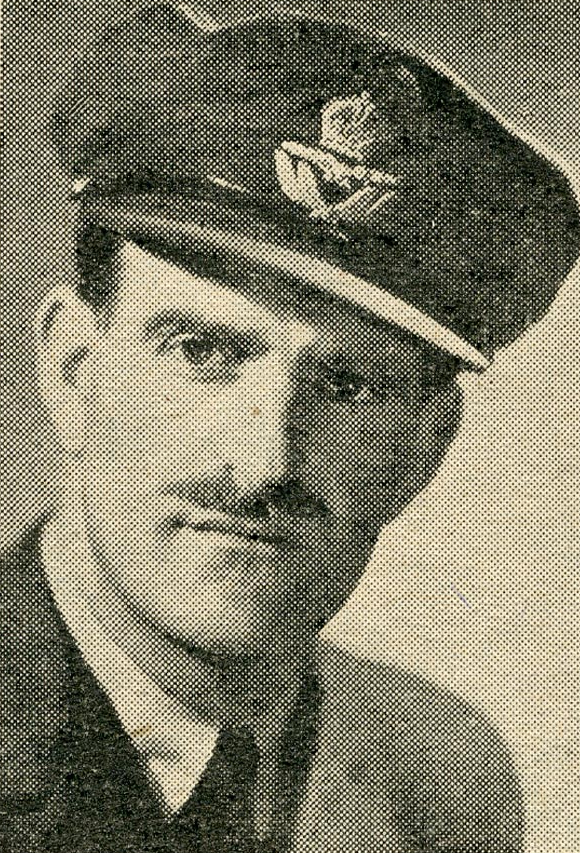
Ted Firth

== Air Force Medal (AFM) ==
- Sergeant Allan Arthur Hodder – air gunner, Royal New Zealand Air Force; of Auckland.

== Mention in despatches ==
- Acting Squadron Leader Athol Eric Arnott – Royal Air Force.
- Acting Flight Lieutenant Frederick Henry Craig – Royal Air Force. (Note: Deceased)
- Flight Lieutenant Philip Henry Creswell – Royal New Zealand Air Force.
- Wing Commander Hector Ivo Dabinett – Royal Air Force.
- Acting Squadron Leader John Swire Dinsdale – Royal Air Force.
- Acting Group Captain Geoffrey Twyford Jarman DSO DFC – Royal Air Force.
- Acting Group Captain Lancelot Elworthy Jarman DFC – Royal Air Force.
- Wing Commander Rex Laughton Kippenberger – Royal Air Force.
- Acting Group Captain Hector Douglas McGregor DSO – Royal Air Force.
- Squadron Leader Trevor Owen Marshall – Royal Air Force.
- Acting Flight Lieutenant Hayden Hugh James Miller DFC – Royal Air Force.
- Squadron Leader Ian Gordon Richmond DFC – Royal Air Force.
- Air Commodore Herbert Bainbrigge Russell DFC – Royal Air Force.
- Acting Flight Lieutenant Clive King Saxelby – Royal Air Force.
- Flight Lieutenant George Ronald Simich DFC – Royal New Zealand Air Force.
- Sergeant James Bayntun Starky – Royal New Zealand Air Force.
- Flying Officer Charles William Halliwell Thomson – Royal Air Force.
- Flight Lieutenant Ronald Galpin Thorby – Royal Air Force.
- Sergeant Robert Alfred Turton – Royal New Zealand Air Force.
- Wing Commander Eric William Whitley DFC – Royal Air Force.
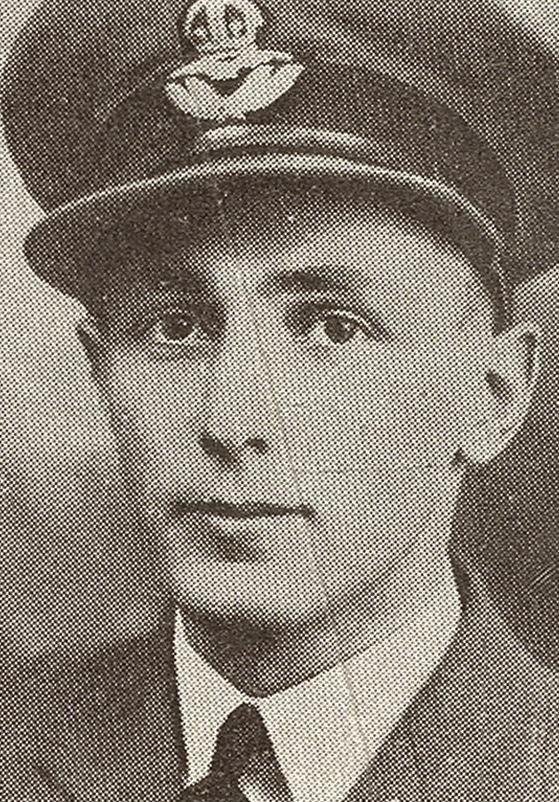
Frederick Henry Craig

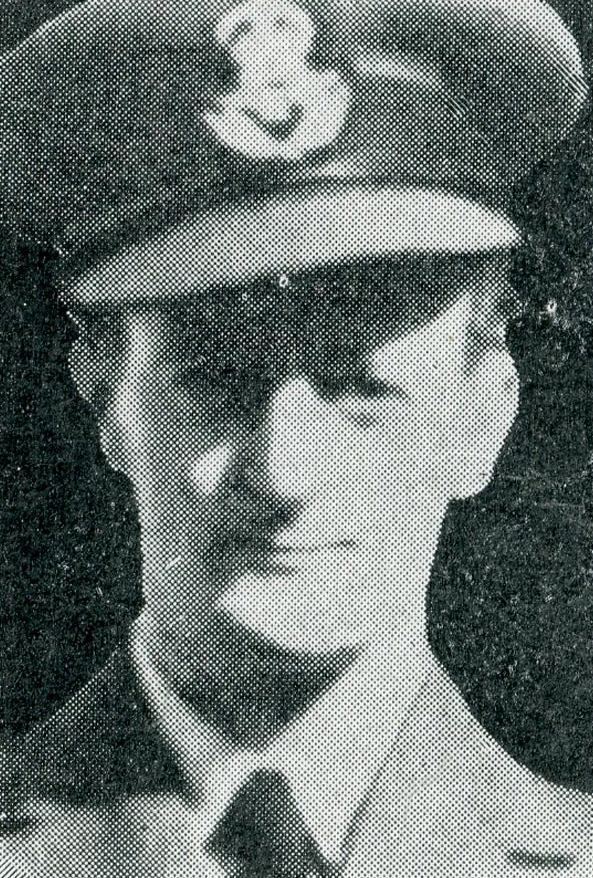
Philip Henry Creswell

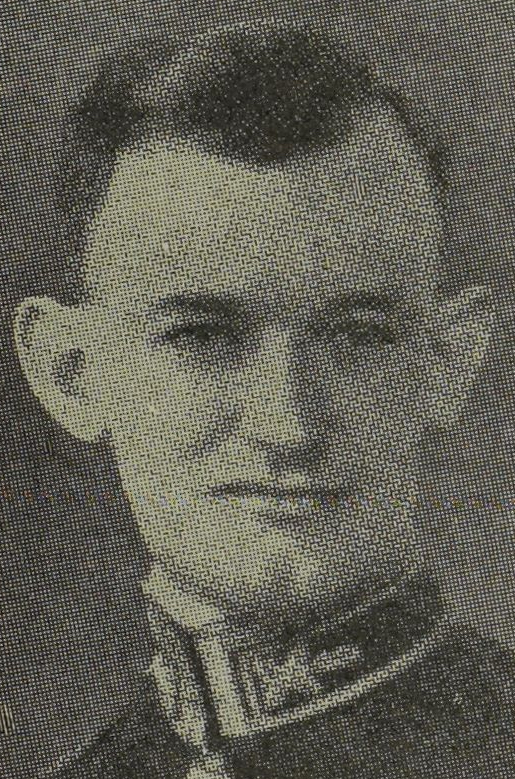
Hector McGregor

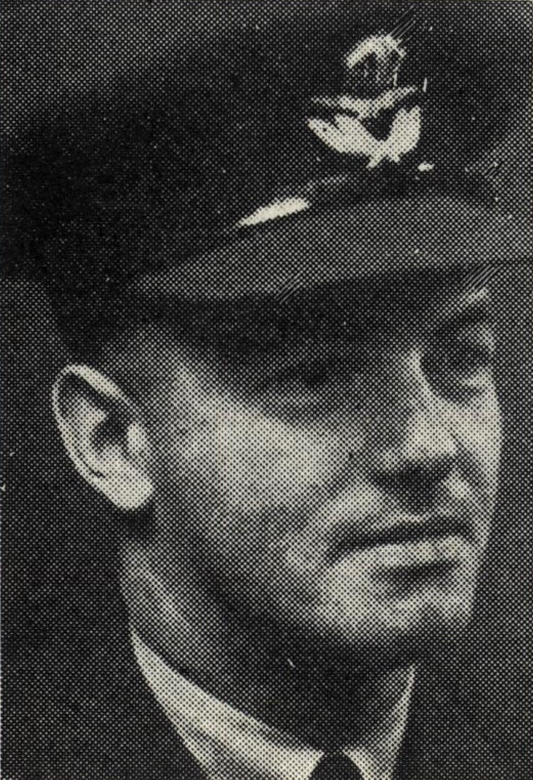
Hugh Miller

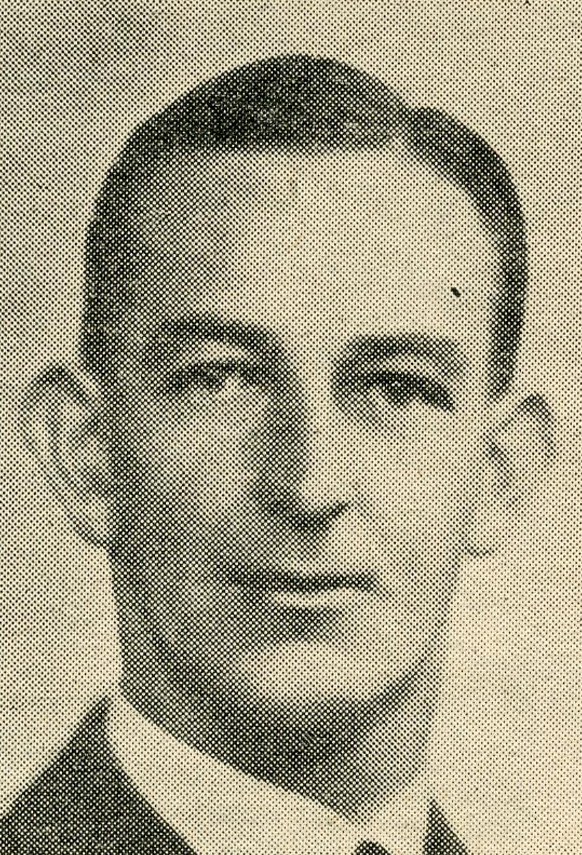
Ian Gordon Richmond

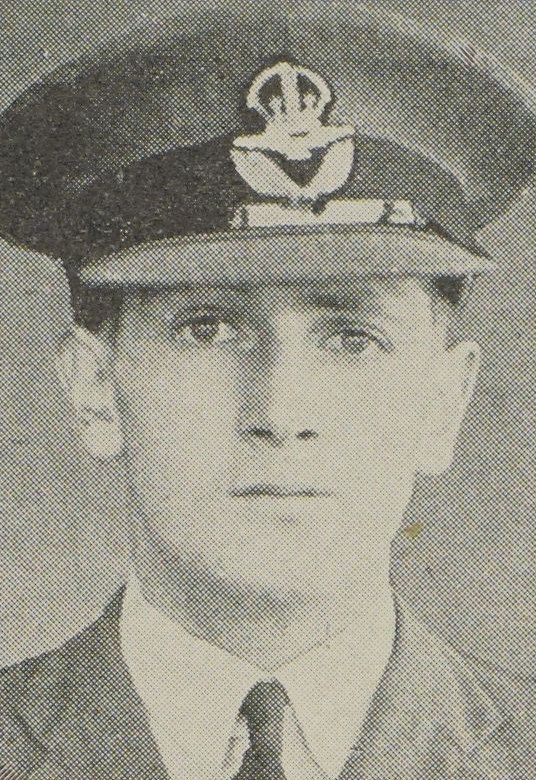
Clive Saxelby

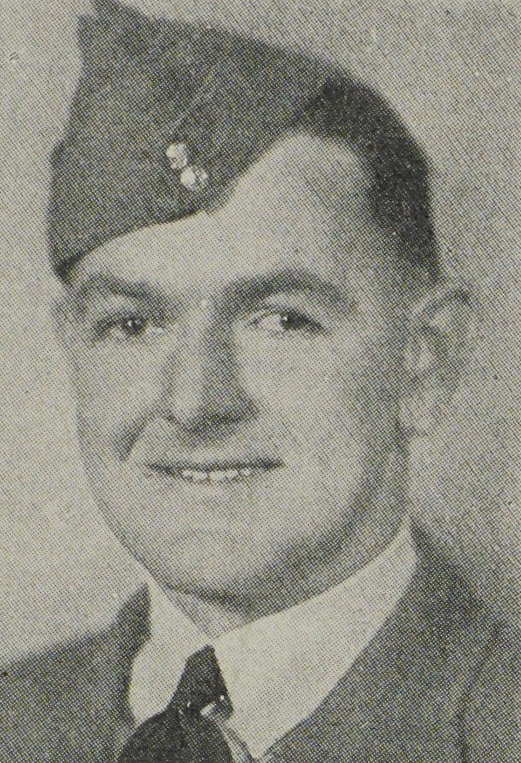
George Ronald Simich

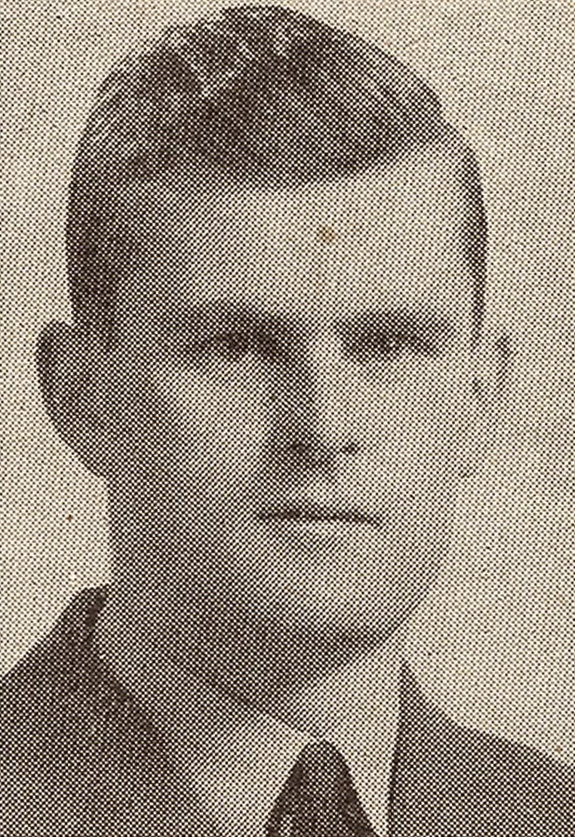
Jim Starky

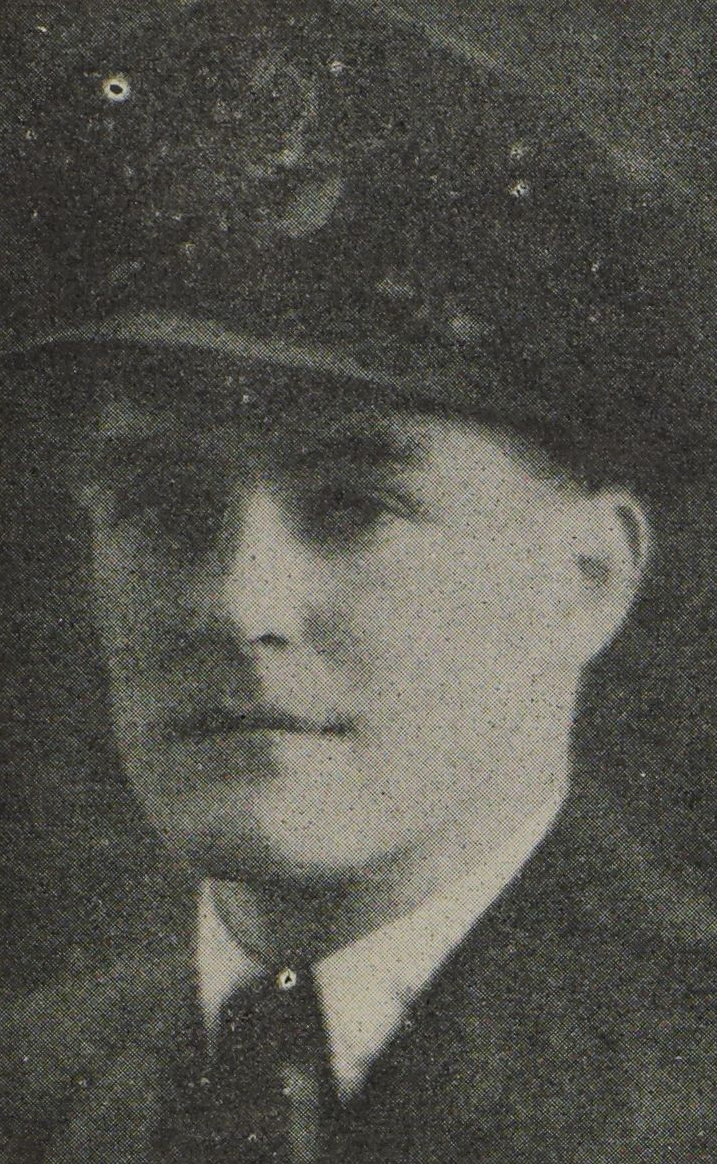
Eric Whitley
