= Ethel Jacobson (New Zealand editor) =

New Zealand newspaper editor (1877–1965)

- Jacobson, c. 1920
- Born: 6 September 1877; Lyttelton, New Zealand
- Died: 6 December 1965 (aged 88); Akaroa, New Zealand
- Occupations: Newspaper editor; journalist
- Writing career
- Notable work: Editor of Akaroa Mail

Ethel May Jacobson (6 September 1877 – 14 June 1965) was a New Zealand newspaper editor and journalist. She was the editor of the Akaroa Mail for almost fifty years, having taken over from her father due to his ill-health. During her tenure, the newspaper had a reputation for high-quality reporting.

== Early life and education ==
Jacobson was born in Lyttelton, in the Canterbury Region of New Zealand on 6 September 1877. Her father, Howard Jacobson, was the owner and editor of the Akaroa Mail and Banks Peninsula Advertiser; her mother, Margaret Dougherty, was the daughter of community leader Sarah Dougherty. Jacobson was the seventh of their fourteen children.

Jacobson attended Christchurch Girls' High School, where she received a junior scholarship in 1895, and graduated from Canterbury College with a bachelor's arts degree in 1900 and a master's degree in English and French in 1901.

== Career ==
After leaving university, Jacobson began teaching at Nelson College for Girls, but left in 1903 to help her unwell father with running the Akaroa Mail. She became the de-facto editor at this time, but said:

When I started off, most people really meant it when they told women they had no brains. One day, soon after I took over, I met a prominent resident who said, "Do tell your father how much I enjoyed that article of his. I knew he must have written it because it was so good."

After Howard died in 1910, Ethel became the newspaper's permanent editor, remaining in that role until 1952. In 1911 she was said by the Northern Advocate to be the "only lady editor" in New Zealand. Her younger brother joined her as business manager in 1911; in later years, he often received credit for the newspaper's high-quality reporting. The newspaper had a staff of four printers. Jacobson travelled all over the district to undertake reporting; the Dictionary of New Zealand Biography recorded that the Akaroa Mail "was a tribute to her scholarship and ability".

In 1917, Jacobson printed a third edition of her father's 1884 book, Tales of Banks Peninsula; she wrote a preface about the importance of first-hand stories from pioneer settlers. She also led the publication of Akaroa and Banks Peninsula, 1840–1940.

In her spare time, Jacobson was a founding member of the Akaroa Women's Institute and a member of the local Horticultural Society. The Evening Post noted her gardening and golfing abilities in addition to her work as "lady editor", and "salute[d] such versatility". She died at her family home in Akaroa on 14 June 1965.
