= Aubrey Ellwood =

Royal Air Force Air Marshal (1897–1992)

Sir Aubrey Beauclerk Ellwood
- Born: 3 July 1897; Oakham, Rutland
- Died: 20 December 1992 (aged 95); Crewkerne, Somerset
- Military career
- Allegiance: United Kingdom
- Branch: Royal Navy (1916–18); Royal Air Force (1918–52)
- Service years: 1916–52
- Rank: Air Marshal
- Commands: Transport Command (1950–52); Bomber Command (1947–50); No. 18 Group (1943–44); No. 5 Squadron (1932–34)
- Conflicts: First World War; Second World War
- Awards: Knight Commander of the Order of the Bath; Distinguished Service Cross; Mentioned in Despatches

Air Marshal Sir Aubrey Beauclerk Ellwood, KCB, DSC, DL (3 July 1897 – 20 December 1992) was a British Royal Air Force officer who became a double flying ace during World War I.

== Career ==
Educated at Marlborough College, Ellwood joined the Royal Naval Air Service in 1916. During his service as a fighter pilot in the First World War, he scored ten victories (all in the Sopwith Camel) to become a double flying ace, being awarded the Distinguished Service Cross in the process. Having been awarded one of the first permanent commissions in the Royal Air Force in 1919, he was appointed Officer Commanding No. 5 Squadron in India in 1932 before returning to the UK in 1937 to join the Directing Staff at the RAF Staff College.

Ellwood served in the Second World War as Deputy Director of Bomber Operations before becoming Air Officer Commanding No. 18 Group in January 1943 and then Senior Air Staff Officer at Headquarters Coastal Command in March 1944. He completed his service as Director-General of Personnel.

After the war Ellwood was appointed the Air Officer Commanding in Chief Bomber Command. His next and last tour was as Air Officer Commanding in Chief Transport Command before retiring in January 1952.

In retirement he became Deputy Lieutenant of Somerset. Also Governor & Commandant of the Church Lads' Brigade from 1954 to 1970.

Military offices
Preceded by Sir Hugh Saunders	Commander-in-Chief Bomber Command; 1947–1950	Succeeded by Sir Hugh Lloyd
Preceded by Sir Brian Baker	Commander-in-Chief Transport Command; 1950–1952	Succeeded by Robert Blucke
