= Robert Blucke =

Royal Air Force Air Vice-Marshal (1897-1988)

- Born: 22 June 1897
- Died: 2 October 1988 (aged 91)
- Military career
- Allegiance: United Kingdom
- Branch: British Army (1915–1918); Royal Air Force (1918–1952)
- Service years: 1915–1952
- Rank: Air Vice Marshal
- Commands: Transport Command (1952); Air Headquarters Malaya (1951–1952); No. 1 (Bomber) Group (1945–1946); RAF Ludford Magna (1943–1945); RAF Holme-on-Spalding Moor (1942–1943); Wireless Investigation Development Unit (1940); Blind Approach Training and Development Unit (1940)
- Conflicts: First World War; Second World War
- Awards: Companion of the Order of the Bath; Commander of the Order of the British Empire; Distinguished Service Order; Air Force Cross & Bar; Mentioned in Despatches (2)

Air Vice Marshal Robert Stewart Blucke, CB, CBE, DSO, AFC & Bar (22 June 1897 – 2 October 1988) was a Royal Air Force officer who became Air Officer Commanding-in-Chief at RAF Transport Command in 1952.

== RAF career ==
Blucke was commissioned into the 3rd Battalion the Dorsetshire Regiment in 1915 during the First World War and transferred to No. 63 Squadron on formation of the Royal Air Force in April 1918. He became a Signals Officer at the Experimental Section of the Royal Aircraft Establishment in January 1934 and in February 1935 he flew a Handley Page Heyford over Stowe Nine Churches becoming the first pilot to be detected by radar. He served in the Second World War as Officer Commanding the Blind Approach Training and Development Unit and then as Officer Commanding the Wireless Investigation Development Unit before joining the Directorate of Flying Training at the Air Ministry in November 1940. He became Station Commander at RAF Holme-on-Spalding Moor in 1942, in which role he was awarded the Distinguished Service Order for a bombing run over Mannheim in a damaged Lancaster, before becoming Station Commander at RAF Ludford Magna in 1943 and Air Officer Commanding No. 1 (Bomber) Group in 1945.

After the War he was appointed Senior Air Staff Officer at Air Headquarters India and then became Air Officer Administration at Headquarters Technical Training Command in 1947. He went on to be Air Officer Administration at Headquarters Far East Air Force in 1949, Air Officer Commanding Air Headquarters Malaya in 1951 and Air Officer Commanding-in-Chief at RAF Transport Command in January 1952 before retiring in July that year.

== Personal life ==
In 1967 he lived in Kent, where, on 10 February 1968, 24 year old window cleaner David Gilbert broke into his house, and assaulted police officer Peter Gundry. Gilbert was sentenced to three years in prison in March 1968.

His son David also pursued a career with the Royal Air Force, becoming a Group Captain and station commander of RAF Coningsby. He died in the 1974 Norfolk mid-air collision, when the Phantom jet he was piloting made contact with a crop-spraying aircraft.

Military offices
Preceded by Edward Rice	Air Officer Commanding No. 1 Group; 1945–1946	Succeeded by Charles Guest
Preceded by Sir Aubrey Ellwood	Commander-in-Chief Transport Command; January – June 1952	Succeeded by Sir Charles Guest
