= List of people on the postage stamps of New Zealand =

This is a list of people on stamps of New Zealand.

Link

The year given is the year of issue of the first stamp depicting that person.

Data has been entered up to the end of 2002.

== A ==
- The Prince Andrew (1963)
- The Princess Anne (1952)
- Sean Astin (2001)

== B ==
- Brian Barratt-Boyes (1995)
- Joseph Banks (1969)
- Aunt Daisy (Maud Ruby Basham) (1994)
- Albert Henry Baskerville (1995)
- Jean Batten (1990)
- James K. Baxter (1989)
- Sean Bean (2001)
- Princess Beatrice of York (1989)
- Cate Blanchett (2001)
- Evelyn Brooke (2015)
- Peter Buck (1990)

== C ==
- King Charles III (2023)
- Sir Winston Churchill (1965)
- James Cook (1940)
- Whina Cooper (1995)
- Barry Crump (1995)

== D ==
- Stewie Dempster (1992)
- Jules Dumont d'Urville (1997)

== E ==
- The Duke of Edinburgh (1953)
- Edward VII (1909)
- The Duke of Windsor (formerly Edward VIII) (1940)
- The Prince Edward (1973)
- The Princess Elizabeth (later the Queen) (1943)
- Queen Elizabeth (later the Queen Mother) (1937)

== F ==
- W. H. A. Feilding (1981)
- Bernard Freyberg (1990)

== G ==
- George V (1915)
- George VI (1937)
- John Robert Godley (1950)
- George Grey (1979)
- Elizabeth Gunn (1969)

== H ==
- Richard Hadlee (1995)
- Prince Harry (1985)
- James Hector (1967)
- Hōne Heke (1990)
- Sir Edmund Hillary (1994)
- William Hobson (1990)

== J ==
- Robert Jack (1992)

== K ==
- Te Ruki Kawiti (1990)
- Truby King (1957)
- Charles Kingsford Smith (1958)

== L ==
- Christopher Lee (2001)
- Danyon Loader (1996)
- Jack Lovelock (1990)

== M ==
- Ian McKellen (2001)
- Katherine Mansfield (1989)
- The Princess Margaret (1943)
- Samuel Marsden (1964)
- Ngaio Marsh (1989)
- Queen Mary (1935)
- Bruce Mason (1989)
- Viggo Mortensen (2001)

== N ==
- Grace Neill (1990)
- George Nēpia (1990)
- Āpirana Ngata (1980)

== O ==
- Miranda Otto (2002)

== P ==
- Richard Pearse (1990)

== R ==
- Ernest Rutherford, physicist (1971)

== S ==
- Richard John Seddon (1979)
- Katherine Sheppard (1990)
- George Smith (1995)
- Peter Snell (2004)
- Daniel Solander (1969)
- Tommy Solomon (1991)

== T ==
- Blyth Tait (1996)
- Abel Tasman (1940)
- Hakopa Te Ata-o-tu (1980)
- Te Hau-Takiri Wharepapa (1980)
- Te Heu Heu Tukino IV (1980)
- Kiri Te Kanawa (1995)
- Te Puea Herangi (1980)

== U ==
- Charles Upham (1995)

== V ==
- Queen Victoria (1855)
- Julius Vogel (1979)

== W ==
- Prince William (now Prince of Wales) (1985)
- John Walker (2004)
- Anthony Wilding (1992)
- The Prince of Wales (1950)
- The Princess of Wales (1981)
- Yvette Williams (2004)
- Elijah Wood (2001)

== Y ==
- The Duchess of York (1989)
