= Josiah Firth =

New Zealand politician (1826–1897)

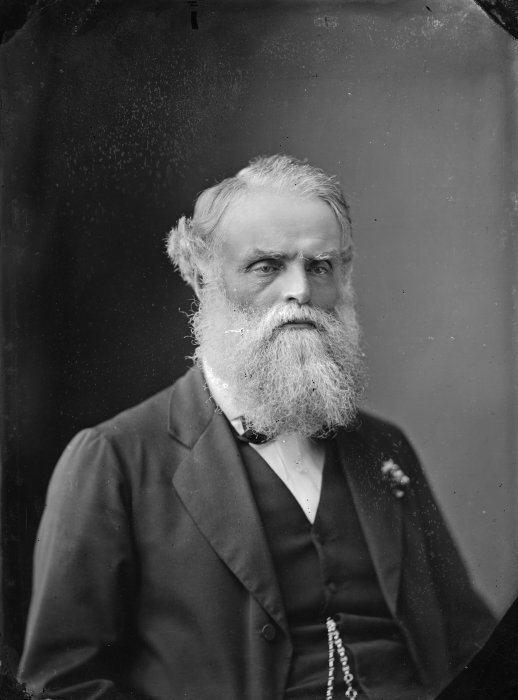
- Firth in the 1880s

Member of the New Zealand Parliament for Auckland West
- In office 1861 – 30 April 1862 Serving with John Williamson
- Preceded by: New constituency
- Succeeded by: James Williamson

Personal details
- Born: Josiah Clifton Firth; 27 October 1826 Clifton, Yorkshire, England
- Died: 11 December 1897 (aged 71) Auckland, New Zealand
- Party: Independent
- Spouse: Anne Firth (Williams)
- Children: 12
- Relatives: Clifton Firth (grandson); Ted Firth (grandson); Tony Firth (grandson)
- Occupation: Businessman and politician
- Known for: Messenger between Te Kooti and New Zealand Government during Te Kooti's War

Josiah Clifton Firth (27 October 1826 – 11 December 1897) was a New Zealand farmer, businessman and politician who had a brief brush with fame as the messenger between Te Kooti and the New Zealand Government during Te Kooti's War.

== Early life ==
Born in Clifton, Yorkshire, England, on 27 October 1826, Firth was the son of a reverend and headmaster whose family had interests in farming, with investments in the wool trade. The family of his mother, Mary née Bateman Firth, were involved in industry, controlling an iron works. When Firth was seven years old, his mother died. He was raised by his father and a servant and received a well-rounded education. The fortunes of his father declined after the 1847 economic crash and Firth took up farming in Yorkshire for a few years, before going to work for his mother's family, managing an iron works.

== New Zealand ==
New Zealand Parliament
Years	Term	Electorate	Party
1861–1862	3rd	City of Auckland West	Independent

In 1854, Firth left England to travel to Australia. After a brief period in Victoria and New South Wales, he moved onto New Zealand and settled in Auckland, establishing a business making bricks. He also took a one third interest in a steam powered flour mill in 1856. In 1859 he made his first visit to Matamata where he met and became friends with Wiremu Tamihana, the King Maker and met King Pōtatau during a tour of the Waikato he published in 1860. His account ended with a prophecy of the Invasion of the Waikato, saying, "It is unfortunate that the remedy we propose should have an aspect of selfishness. For we say to them, and justly, 'Sell three-fourths of your lands, and cease to be nomads, if you wish to save your race from extinction.' They not unnaturally decline the prescription when the fee is apparently so large. So the matter rests for the present. Time and the natural progress of events will, nevertheless, shortly either enforce the prescription and exact the fee, or consign the refractory patients to a swift and sure destruction."

In Auckland he was one of a small group of highly influential business men such as John Logan Campbell, Frederick Whitaker and Thomas Morrin. They had significant influence on The Bank of New Zealand and the New Zealand Loan and Mercantile Agency Company. Firth was always able to borrow finance to capitalise his many innovative schemes.

Firth briefly entered Parliament for the Auckland West electorate. He was elected in 1861, and resigned on 30 April 1862. He promoted the purchase of land directly from Māori as had happened in the Wairarapa. This contravened the Treaty of Waitangi but had been a mechanism used from time to time in localised issues when Māori agreed.

In 1865 with the establishment of peace in the Waikato, Firth was able to lease land from Tamihana of Ngati Haua, a kingitanga tribe. Tamihana, who was a Christian, had been at the core of the Kingite movement but was at heart a man of peace. A large area of land around Matamata was leased for a rental of up to five hundred pounds a year. Two years later he bought outright some of the land covered by the lease and this became the basis of his estate at Matamata. By 1865, Firth had leased 55,000 acres (22,000 ha). "The fern and bracken covered plains was burnt and soon sown in grassland and feed crops such as turnips."

He built his first homestead near Peria where Tamihana had earlier established a missionary station. When Tamihana died in 1866 Firth had a monument built at the place he died with an inscription that said it was Tamihana's will that Firth stay on the Matamata land as long as he (Firth) chose. Meanwhile, his businesses in Auckland were prospering and he was able to lease a very fine house on the eastern side of Mount Eden from John Ogilvie (1839?–1871) Secretary to the Auckland Board of Commissioners (in 1871 he would purchase the house).

Early in 1870 Josiah, or Hohaia as he was known to Māori, was contacted by Te Kooti during his flight from Te Porere through the King Country and back to Te Urewera. From his base at Tapapa, near Tirau, Te Kooti sent a message to Firth to meet him at Tamihana's monument. Firth claimed to have inherited Tamihana's "mantle of patience". Before the meeting Firth contacted Daniel Pollen, the general agent for the government in Auckland. On 17 January, Firth met Te Kooti. Firth told Te Kooti he had come to listen, as he had no power to offer any terms. They talked for some time with Te Kooti emphasising he would not surrender but wanted to be left in peace to live at Tapapa. Firth noted that although Te Kooti was unarmed he was backed by a semi circle of heavily armed men with modern weapons in good condition. He told Firth: "If they let me alone I will live quietly; if not I will fight."

The government sent word to Firth that they had nothing to say to Te Kooti apart from if he surrendered he would be given safe conduct to Auckland. This telegram crossed with one from Firth outlining Te Kooti's wishes. But Te Kooti had aroused too much fear and hatred for his offer to be accepted, and it was rejected out of hand. There was also considerable official annoyance with Firth. The Premier, Willian Fox, and the government agent for Hawkes Bay, John Davies Ormond, were irate "with that meddlesome sweep Firth." The military were instructed to attack Te Kooti whether Firth was with him or not. For Te Kooti the whole meeting may have been another ruse, as shortly afterwards Chief Te Hiri from Coromandel arrived and gave Te Kooti a huge quantity of gunpowder (7 kegs) and a bag of bullets 2 feet (0.61 m) high. In fact, Te Kooti had "predicted" he would be given the ammunition down to the exact day and time. indicating the resupply mission had been prearranged.

In 1873, Firth began a seven-year project to clear the Waihou River of snags and obstacles to navigation thus opening the upper reaches of the Thames Estuary to shipping. He was the author of "Our Kin across the Sea".

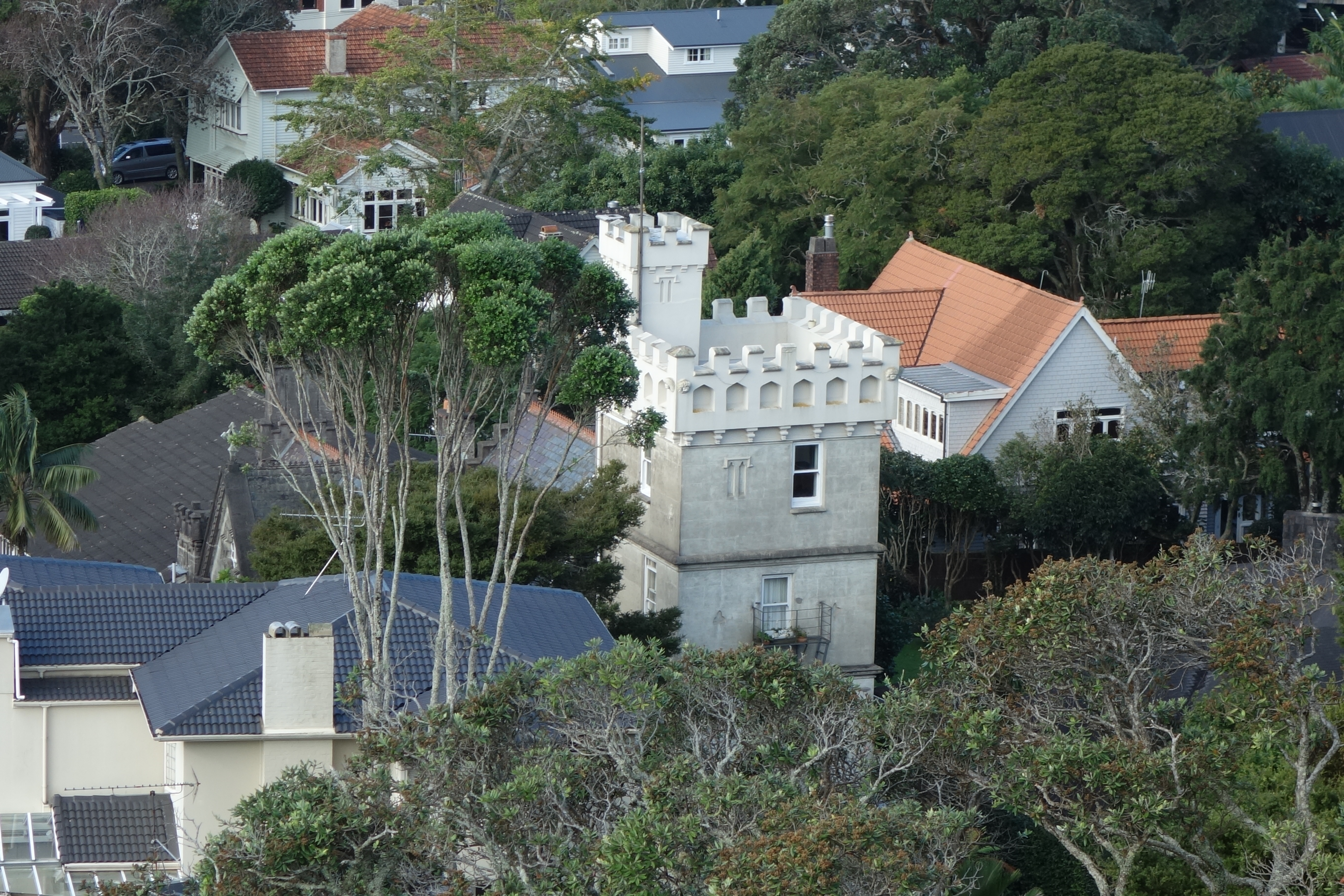
Clifton as seen from Maungawhau / Mount Eden in 2018

In 1871 Firth purchased his Auckland residence—Clifton—that he had previously leased, and extended the building. To the rear of the wooden Gothic house he erected a large wing in the castellated style which included a 15-metre (49 ft) tall tower, completed in 1873. This structure was built in unreinforced concrete, an experimental material for the period. As well as providing a vantage point with splendid views of the Waitematā Harbour, the tower contained a water tank so the up-to-date indoor plumbing had good water pressure. The tower also contained a study for Firth in which he arranged a small museum of geological items and other curiosities. The house is a Category 1 Heritage New Zealand listed building. In 1882 at Matamata he constructed a second castellated tower, a slightly smaller version of the Mount Eden tower and likewise an extension to an earlier wooden residence. Known as Firth Tower, it is part of the Matamata museum.

Firth championed the use of concrete as a building material and significantly, Firth's younger grandsons Ted and Tony would go on to found the Firth Concrete Company. Firth's two concrete structures are now some of the earliest examples of concrete construction in the country, as John Logan Campbell's 1871 house 'Loganbank' in Official Bay has been demolished. As a member of the Beresford Street Congregationalist Church in Karangahape Road, Firth influenced the choice of concrete for that building as well (1875).

In 1882, Firth arranged a grand reception in the grounds of Clifton House for the Māori King, Tāwhiao. Firth had played a part in the establishment of Tāwhiao's father, the Waikato chief Pōtatau Te Wherowhero, as the first Māori King in 1858.

New Zealand agriculture went through a serious depression during the 1880s, one which hit Firth hard, and in 1889 he was declared bankrupt. Later he began to develop a trade in pumice based on its properties of insulation and fire resistance, travelling to the United States and England. He died suddenly on 11 December 1897 just as the venture was becoming successful, and was buried at St Stephen's Cemetery in the Auckland suburb of Parnell.

== Publications ==
- Firth, Josiah Clifton (1888). Our Kin Across the Sea. London: Longmans, Green, and Co.
- Firth, Josiah Clifton (1890). Nation Making: A Story of New Zealand; Savagism v. Civilisation. London: Longmans, Green, and Co.

== See also ==
- Gordon, Mona Clifton (1963). The Golden Age of Josiah Clifton Firth. Christchurch: Pegasus Books.
- Gordon, Mona Clifton (1973). Portrait in Mosaic of Ann Clifton Firth. Christchurch: Pegasus Books.
