= Sarah Robb O'Hagan =

New Zealand business executive, author, and public speaker

- Education: University of Auckland (BCom)
- Occupations: Business executive, author
- Notable work: Extreme You (2017)

Sarah Robb O'Hagan is a New Zealand-born business executive and author known for leadership roles in the sports and fitness industries. She currently serves as the Chief Content and Member Development Officer at Peloton Interactive.

== Early life and education ==
Robb O'Hagan was born in Hawke's Bay, New Zealand to a professional rugby player father and a language teacher mother. She received a Bachelor of Commerce from the University of Auckland in 1993.

== Career ==
Robb O'Hagan began her career in various marketing roles at Air New Zealand (1993–1998), then joined Virgin Atlantic and Virgin Entertainment as a director of marketing (1998–2000) and Atari as a vice president of marketing (2000–2002). She was fired twice, first at Virgin and then at Atari, during a period that she described as "epic failure." Robb O'Hagan remarked publicly that she "fully deserved" to be fired from both companies for being "so arrogant [and] so cocky," but later described that her experience laid the groundwork for later success. After Atari, she joined Nike as a director of marketing and then general manager (2002–2008).

In 2008, Robb O'Hagan joined PepsiCo as chief marketing officer of Gatorade and was subsequently promoted to president of Gatorade in 2010. She joined during a period of declining sales and is credited with transforming the business by positioning Gatorade as performance enhancement for high-level athletes rather than a mass-market sports drink. That strategy included expanding the product line with gels and protein drinks and shifting marketing spend from traditional TV advertising, which made up 90% of Gatorade's marketing budget, and focusing on sponsorships of pro sports players. Asked about the shift, Robb O'Hagan said "why on earth would you spend money on Super Bowl ads when players are drinking our products during the entire game?" Gatorade's 2009 "What is G?" campaign, part of a new marketing strategy that simplified the Gatorade label to "G," featured athletes like Michael Jordan, Billie Jean King, and Muhammad Ali. It was critiqued by media as a misfire amid a 17.5% sales slump and led to PepsiCo CEO Indra Nooyi conceding that she doesn't expect strong growth from the product in the U.S. ever again. However, by 2011, sales exceeded $3 billion, a 9% increase from a year earlier. The brand's repositioning earned Robb O'Hagan recognition as one of Fast Company's 2012 "Most Creative People in Business."

In August 2012, she was appointed the first President of Equinox. Robb O'Hagan narrowed Equinox's targeting towards people who are avid athletes and focused on building aspirationalism and exclusivity surrounding the brand. She also oversaw the company's international expansion to London and Toronto in late 2012.

Robb O'Hagan served as CEO of Flywheel Sports, a boutique studio cycling business, from 2017 to 2018. She led a push to launch an in-home bike competitor to Peloton. In September 2020, two years after Robb O'Hagan left the company, competitive pressure from Peloton and a pandemic-related slowdown of boutique fitness led to Flywheel filing for bankruptcy and permanently closing its remaining studios.

Robb O'Hagan became the CEO of Exos, a company known for training elite athletes and providing corporate health and wellness offerings, in January 2020. During 2024 interviews, Robb O'Hagan publicly advocated for changes in workplace structure, in particular supporting the shift to a four-day workweek and building structured periods of recovery into company cultures. She cited a six-month internal experiment run with Adam Grant and other researchers at the University of Pennsylvania's Wharton School testing meeting-heavy Tuesdays and Thursdays, quiet work days on Mondays and Wednesdays, and "You Do You Fridays," where surveyed employees reported a 27% increase in spending their time effectively at work.

On April 1, 2026, Robb O'Hagan joined Peloton as Chief Content and Member Development Officer.

== Board service ==
Robb O'Hagan has served on the board of JetBlue Airways since 2018. She served on the board of Strava between 2016 and 2022.

== Personal life ==
Robb O'Hagan lives in New York City with her husband, Liam, and three children.

== Books ==
Robb O'Hagan is the author of Extreme You: Step Up, Stand Out, Kick Ass, Repeat (HarperBusiness, 2017), a self-help book where she featured stories of successful "Extremers" like Condoleezza Rice and Bode Miller to argue that embracing failure is what unlocks true potential.

== Recognition ==
Fast Company: "Most Creative People in Business" (2012). Forbes: "Most Powerful Women in Sports" (2009; 2015).
