= Percy Roderick Coleman =

New Zealand mechanic, motor-cycle racer, and aviator (1897–1965)

Percy Roderick Coleman (26 January 1897 – 20 April 1965) was a New Zealand mechanic, motor-cycle racer, businessman and aviator. He was born in Ngaere, Taranaki, New Zealand on 26 January 1897.
