= Ted Firth =

New Zealand manufacturer, aviator, and military leader (1905–1978)

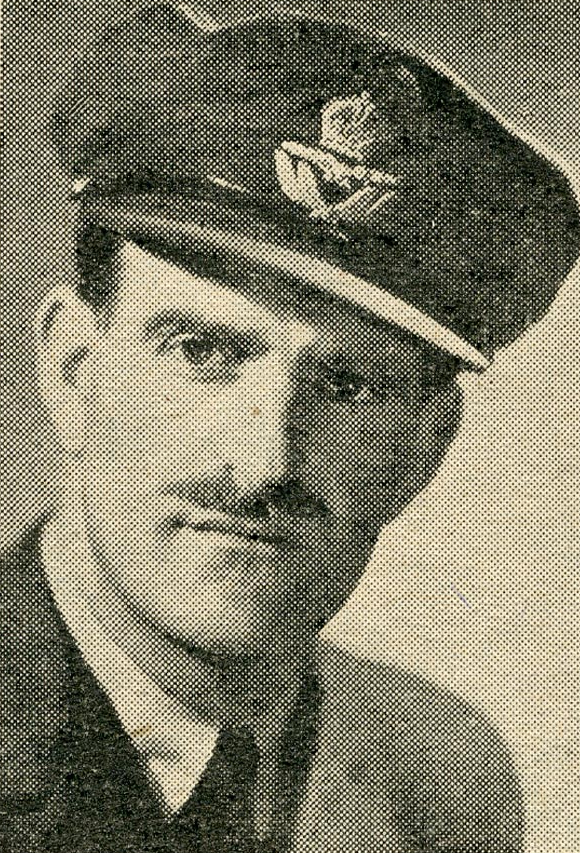
Firth during World War II

Edward Buckland Firth AFC (27 September 1905 – 6 May 1978) was a New Zealand manufacturer, aviator, and military leader. He co-founded Firth Concrete with his younger brother Tony Firth.

Firth was born in Auckland in 1905. His father was the inventor and manufacturer Ned Firth and his mother was Blanch Emily Banks. Clifton Firth (1904–1980) was his elder brother and Tony Firth (1907–1980) was his younger brother. Josiah Firth was his grandfather.

In the 1942 King's Birthday Honours, Firth was awarded the Air Force Cross.
