= Ben Hawker =

Benjamin Joseph Hawker
- Born: 29 November 1975 (age 49); Christchurch, New Zealand
- Occupation: Film director

Benjamin Joseph Hawker (born 29 November 1975) is a New Zealand film director and special effects artist.

== Early life ==
Hawker was born in Lincoln, Christchurch. He attended Killara High School in Sydney, Australia and graduated from the National Institute of Dramatic Art (NIDA) in 1995.

== Career ==
Hawker is best known for his work in special effects as a creature and make-up effects artist, predominantly in association with Weta Workshop on The Lord of the Rings film trilogy. Hawker has directed music videos for New Zealand musicians, Louis Baker and Thomas Oliver. His first feature film was Blackspot, which was released in New Zealand on 15 July 2009, following festival screenings in Europe and the United States. He has also directed numerous short films and the 2015 documentary series, Building Gallipoli for New Zealand's National Museum, Te Papa Tongarewa.

== Filmography ==
- Blackspot (2008) - Director
- Building Gallipoli (2015) - Director

== Art Direction ==
- Ghost in the Shell (2017) - Weta Workshop Design

== Special effects ==
- Avatar (2009) - Prop design
- District 9 (2009) - Creature effects
- 30 Days of Night (2007) - Prosthetic effects
- The Chronicles of Narnia: The Lion, the Witch and the Wardrobe (2005): Sculptor / designer
- King Kong (2005) - Creature designer
- Peter Pan (2003) - Sculptor / Puppeteer
- The Last Samurai (2003) - Prosthetic effects
- Perfect Strangers (2003) - Prosthetic effects
- The Lord of the Rings: The Return of the King (2003) - Creature designer
- The Lord of the Rings: The Two Towers (2002) - Creature effects
- The Lord of the Rings: The Fellowship of the Ring (2001) - Prosthetic effects
- Babe: Pig in the City (1998) - Special effects technician
