= List of New Zealand Catholics =

This is a list of notable New Zealand Catholics. All additions should be sourced and ideally their faith or Catholic identity should be significant to their notability.

== Activists ==
- Patricia Bartlett, former nun and social conservative. She founded the Society for Promotion of Community Standards.
- Marilyn Pryor, served on the Executive Council of what is now called Voice for Life.

== Artists and architects ==
- Francis Petre, architect of cathedrals

== Businesspeople ==
- Charles Todd motor-industry pioneer and temperance activist; many in the Todd family were or are Catholics

== Politicians ==
- Anand Satyanand, Governor-General from 2006 to 2011, first Roman Catholic and first ethnic Indian (of Indo-Fijian origins) viceregal officeholder, ombudsman, lawyer and judge
- Jim Bolger, thirty-fifth Prime Minister of New Zealand
- Sir Charles Clifford, 1st Baronet (1813–1893), first Speaker of the New Zealand House of Representatives
- Peter Dignan, fifteenth Mayor of Auckland City
- Bill English, thirty-ninth Prime Minister of New Zealand
- Walter Lee, Auckland member of parliament
- Mark Mitchell, Minister of Police
- Michael Joseph Savage, twenty-third Prime Minister of New Zealand
- Heremia Te Wake, tribal leader and catechist
- Joseph Ward, seventeenth Prime Minister of New Zealand
- Frederick Weld, sixth Prime Minister of New Zealand

== Religious ==
=== Clergy ===
- Fr. Douglas Al-Bazi, refugee from Islamism
- Fr. Mark Beban, also a cricketer.
- Fr. Felix Donnelly (1929-2019), social activist, writer, academic and radio talkback host
- Rev. Fr. George Duggan, philosopher and centenarian
- Fr. David Kennedy, astronomer and educator
- Bernard O'Brien SJ, Seminary professor.
- Antony Sumich, F.S.S.P., New Zealander who was a former international Rugby Union and Cricket player for Croatia.
- Fr. Wiremu Te Awhitu, first Māori to be ordained

=== Religious sisters and nuns ===
- Mary St Domitille Hickey, historian, school principal, and reportedly the first New Zealand woman to be awarded a doctorate in literature
- Mary Gonzaga Leahy, nun and hospital matron
- Sister Mary Leo, music educator, Dame Commander of the Order of the British Empire
- Sister Marie Roche, honoured for her work in a prison

== Writers and journalists ==
- K. O. Arvidson, poet and academic
- James K. Baxter, poet and convert who was offered a job composing catechetical material for the Catholic Education Board
- Eileen Duggan (1894-1972), Poet.
- Patrick Anthony Lawlor, writer known for the autobiographical work Old Wellington days, also worked for the Catholic Writers' Movement of New Zealand
