= Thomas Wong Doo =

New Zealand merchant, interpreter and community leader

Thomas Wong Doo (1903–18 June 1963) was a New Zealand merchant, interpreter and community leader. He was born in Canton, China in 1903.
