= Jeff Williams (running back) =

American football player (born 1943)

Franklin Jeffrey Williams (born May 7, 1943) is an American former professional football player who was a halfback for the Minnesota Vikings of the National Football League (NFL) in 1966. He played college football for the Oklahoma State Cowboys.

Born in High Springs, Florida, Williams attended A. L. Mebane High School and Oklahoma State University, playing 20 games for the Cowboys between 1963 and 1964. He made a total of 90 rushing attempts for 357 yards and one touchdown, and 21 receptions for 190 yards and two touchdowns. He was undrafted going into the NFL, winding up with the Minnesota Vikings in the 1966 season. He played three games and recorded one rushing attempt for two yards and a fumble, four punt returns for −2 yards, and three kickoff returns for 61 yards.
