= Firth Concrete =

New Zealand concrete company

- Type: A division of Fletcher Concrete and Infrastructure Limited
- Industry: Building materials manufacture
- Founded: 1925
- Headquarters: Auckland, New Zealand
- Area served: New Zealand
- Products: Certified concrete, concrete masonry, pre-mixed concrete
- Number of employees: 650
- Parent: Fletcher Building
- Subsidiaries: Dricon
- Website: www.firth.co.nz

Firth Concrete (legal title: Firth Industries) is New Zealand's best known and only national concrete company. It produces low carbon, certified ReadyMix Concrete from its 60+ sites, making it the only concrete supplier with a nationwide presence. Firth manufactures a large range of concrete masonry blocks (grey masonry), paving, retaining wall blocks and brick veneers.

It also has a range of bagged, pre-mixed concrete, mortar, repair compounds and aggregate products under the Dricon brand.

== History ==
The business from which Firth evolved started at Matamata, New Zealand, in 1865. This original business was established by Josiah Firth, who arrived in New Zealand in 1856. On arriving Josiah decided that Auckland needed a modern flour mill. But first it needed a brick-making factory, so he built his own. Meanwhile, his son, Ned Firth, invented the ‘ironclad’ pumice washing boiler. This manufacturing business was later taken on by his sons, Ted Firth and Tony Firth, and it was their joint venture in 1925 that became Firth Concrete Limited.

In the beginning, concrete products in New Zealand were manufactured by hand in small-scale operations. But over the next fifty years driven by two successive building booms, the Firth brothers took their business from a two-man operation to a large, diverse business with branches throughout the country. In 1927 the company acquired its ‘Ironclad’ logo, designed by Clifton Firth. In 1938 it introduced New Zealand's first machine-made concrete blocks. The blocks were cast by a machine called a ‘Rockcrete’ at the company's Frankton factory in Hamilton.

Firth's modern history began in 1973 when Fletcher Holdings bought a minor holding in the company, completing a full buy-out in 1979. In 1993, two Fletcher Challenge Limited business units – Certified Concrete Limited and Firth Concrete Products Limited – were merged to become the Firth company of today, a Business Unit of Fletcher Building Ltd. In April 2001 Fletcher Building separated from Fletcher Challenge to operate as a stand-alone company.

Today Firth has a team of about 650 people, working in more than 65 plant sites throughout New Zealand.

== Products ==
Firth products are divided into three product groups.

=== Certified concrete ===
Firth has supplied concrete to large scale New Zealand projects such as: The Museum of New Zealand – Te Papa Tongarewa, The Auckland Sky Tower, The Victoria Park Tunnel in Auckland and Wellington's Westpac Trust Stadium. Latest projects include: Taxiway Mike at Auckland Airport and wind farm projects in Northland and Otago.

=== Masonry products ===
Firth manufactures concrete masonry in New Zealand: blocks, pavers, retaining wall products and brick veneers at six regional manufacturing plants. All masonry products are made with locally sourced natural aggregates that give them a unique NZ look and feel.

Local manufacturing also gives concrete bricks sustainability and supply chain advantages over imported clay bricks. Due to the manufacturing process and sea freight distance, they have half the embodied carbon, making them the perfect cladding for projects with GWP goals, durability, and low maintenance requirements.

- Firth concrete masonry products | EPD Australasia
- Declare label - Firth Masonry

Firth can make-to-order special mixes with specified colours, abrasion-resistance qualities, high strength commercial masonry and bespoke mix designs using unique coloured or types of aggregates.

The dry-cast manufacturing technique used at their plants, creates dimensionally accurate masonry products, at scale, for supply confidence.

=== Dricon ===
Dricon is a sub-business under Firth and produces pre-mixed, bagged concretes, mortars, plasters and sands. Originating in Tuakau, where it still operates from today, Dricon was founded in 1965 and the business is ISO 9001 Quality Certified.

Dricon's instantly recognisable products include: HandiCrete, RapidSet, TradeMortar and Coloured Mortar. The company also produces a range of repair and additive products: Construction Grout, Culvert Bags, HandiPatch, Oxitone colour tints, PaveLock, PaveSand and more.

- Declare Label - Firth Dricon Mortars
