= Bartolomeo Russo =

New Zealand fisherman, horticulturist and farmer

Bartolomeo Russo (1866–1941) was a notable New Zealand fisherman, horticulturist and farmer. He was born in Stromboli, Italy, in about 1866.
