= RAF Holme-on-Spalding Moor =

Royal Air Force base in Yorkshire, England

RAF Holme-on-Spalding Moor
- Holme-on-Spalding-Moor, East Riding of Yorkshire in England
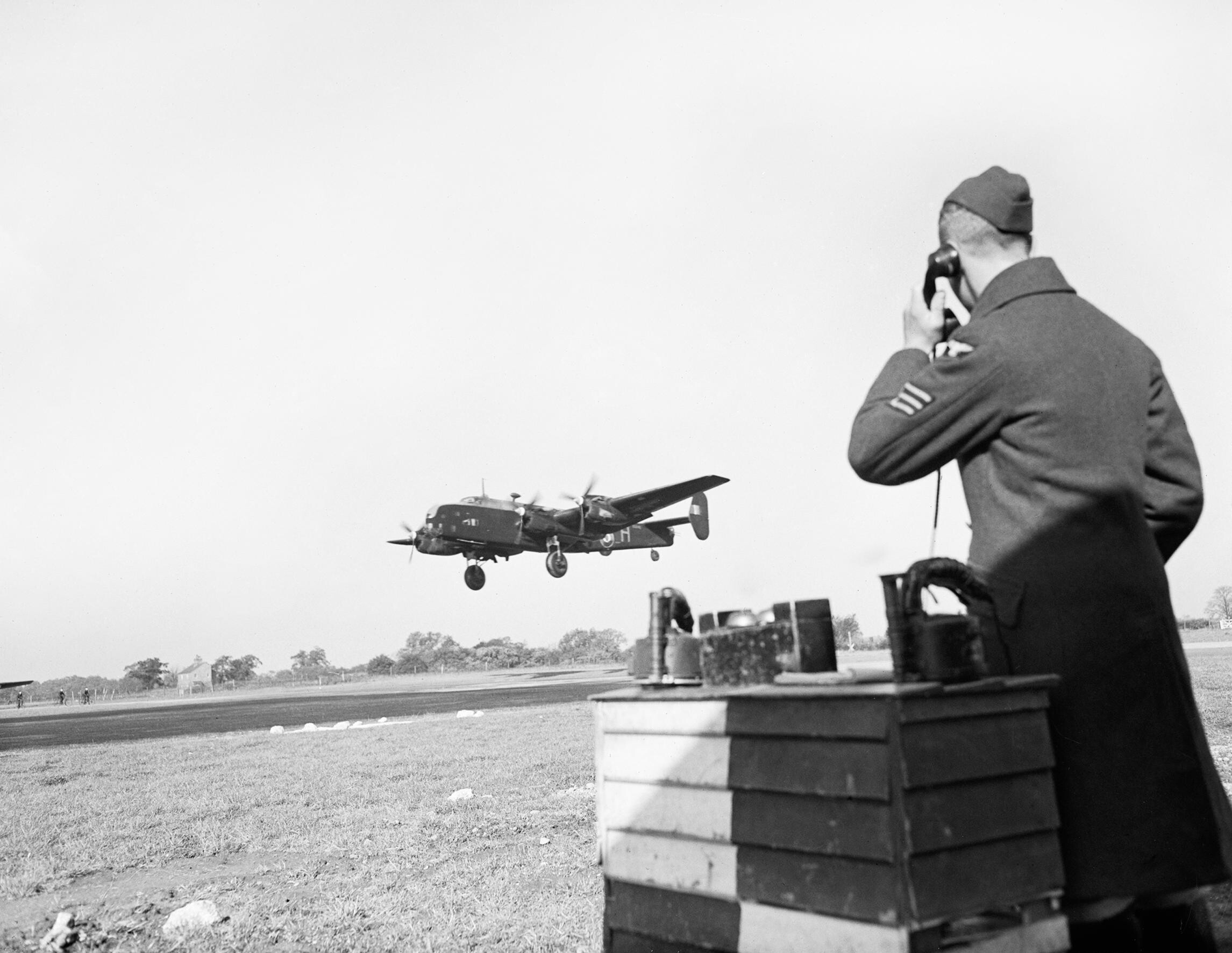
- A sergeant on flying control duty reports the landing of a Halifax Mk V of No. 1663 Heavy Conversion Unit at Holme-on-Spalding Moor, 21 October 1943

Site information
- Type: Royal Air Force station parent station 1941-43; 44 Base HQ 1943-45
- Code: HM
- Owner: Ministry of Defence
- Operator: Royal Air Force; United States Air Force
- Controlled by: RAF Bomber Command * No. 1 Group RAF * No. 4 Group RAF; RAF Transport Command

Location
- Shown within East Riding of Yorkshire RAF Holme (the United Kingdom)
- Coordinates: 53°48′22″N 00°44′31″W

Site history
- Built: 1940/41
- In use: 1941 - 1983
- Battles/wars: European theatre of World War II

Airfield information
- Elevation: 12 feet (4 m) AMSL
Runways
Direction	Length and surface
04/22	4,200 feet (1,280 m) Concrete
08/26	4,200 feet (1,280 m) Concrete
12/30	6,000 feet (1,829 m) Concrete

RAF Holme-on-Spalding Moor, or more simply RAF Holme is a former Royal Air Force station located in Holme-on-Spalding-Moor, East Riding of Yorkshire, England.

The site was built during the Second World War, it was used during the war by the Royal Air Force (RAF) as a bomber station, and after the war as a transport airfield and bomb store before being "mothballed". In the 1950s, the RAF used the station as a training camp before it was transferred to the United States Air Force (USAF) as a reserve station during the Cold War. After USAF use, it became a testing airfield for Blackburn Aircraft and its successor British Aerospace until 1983, when the airfield was closed. Many of the airfield buildings survive as an industrial estate, but most of the runways have been demolished.

== Second World War ==
=== Construction and layout ===
Construction of the airfield began in late 1940, and the airfield was built with three concrete runways and hardstandings for 36 aircraft. The runway headings and lengths were as follows:

Main Runway 12/30 120° and 300° 1,800 yards (1,646 m)
Runway 04/22 40° and 220° 1,200 yards (1,097 m)
Runway 08/26 80° and 260° 1,100 yards (1,006 m)

A year later, all three runways were extended; Runway 12/30 to 2,000 yards (1,829 m), 04/22 to 1,400 yards (1,280 m) and 08/26 to 1,400 yards (1,280 m).

Three hangars were constructed, one Type J and five Type T2s. The technical buildings, including the administration and control buildings, were to the north east of the runways. The accommodation area was further to the north east of the site, and at its maximum housed over 2,000 service personnel. This was well away from the munition stores, that were to the north west of the site.

=== Operational command and allocated units ===
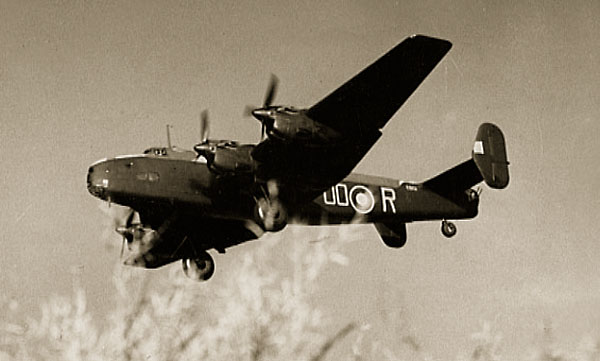
A Handley Page Halifax of No. 1663 Heavy Conversion Unit based at Rufforth, Yorkshire, getting airborne from RAF Holme-on-Spalding Moor during a training flight, circa 1943

Operational command of the station was given to 1 Group of RAF Bomber Command. The first squadron allocated to Holme was 458 Squadron Royal Australian Air Force (RAAF), equipped with Vickers Wellington aircraft. Arriving in August 1941, the squadron conducted its first operation in October 1941, and remained until January 1942. On or about 1 September 1941 the airfield was bombed as a secondary target after a raid on Newcastle with some loss of life. No squadrons were allocated until the extension of the runways was completed, and it was August 1942 before one flight of the Handley Page Halifax equipped 460 Squadron RAAF arrived. This stay only lasted a few weeks before the 460 Squadron aircraft left, and 101 Squadron RAF arrived on transfer from 3 Group. 101 Squadron was in the process of re-equipping with Avro Lancaster aircraft, and did not fly any operations until November 1942.

In June 1943, a reorganisation of group boundaries within Bomber Command saw the station transferred from 1 Group to 4 Group. This change in command resulted in a change of squadrons, with 101 Squadron being replaced by the Halifax equipped 76 Squadron RAF. 76 Squadron remained at Holme until after the end of the war in Europe. 4 Group transferred from Bomber Command to RAF Transport Command in May 1945, and during its final weeks at Holme, 76 Squadron was re-equipped with the Douglas Dakotas. The Dakotas of 76 Squadron were replaced by the same of 512 Squadron in July 1945, before 512 Squadron left in October 1945.

From February 1944 to May 1945, also based at Holme was 1689 Bomber (Defence) Training Flight that flew Hawker Hurricane aircraft on fighter affiliation duties. (Note: Fighter affiliation units assisted bomber units to train crews how to defend their aircraft.)

Also based at Holme during 1943–1944 was No. 1520 (Beam Approach Training) Flight RAF of 23 (Training) Group, RAF Flying Training Command flying Airspeed Oxford aircraft.

After the departure of 512 Squadron, the base was reduced to "care and maintenance" status with just a small number of men to look after it. Part of the airfield was also used as store for surplus bombs.

=== Officers Commanding ===
- 1941–1942 Group Captain F E Nuttall
- 1942 Group Captain A R Combe
- 1942–1943 Group Captain R S Blucke RAF
- April – June 1943 Group Captain D E L Wilson RAAF. (Note: Like many base commanders, Group Captain Wilson occasionally flew on operations. On 22 June 1943, Wilson took one such opportunity but the aircraft he was flying in was shot down. Captured, he was eventually sent to Stalag Luft III where he was Senior British Officer at the end of the war.)
- June 1943 – early 1944 Group Captain G S Hodson RAF
- 1944–1945 Group Captain J E Pelly-Fry RAF
- 1945 Group Captain R H Harris

== Cold War ==
In 1951, with the Korean War still in progress, the decision was taken to expand the number of stations used for flying training. Holme was one of the airfields chosen, and in March 1952 No. 14 Advanced Flying Training School RAF (14 AFTS) was re-formed at Holme, flying Airspeed Oxford and Percival Prentice aircraft. This use of the airfield did not last long, and 14 AFTS was disbanded in January 1953.

The station was then handed over to the United States Air Force while the proposed main airfield for the USAF in Yorkshire, Elvington was under development. The USAF use did not last long, and the airfield was returned to the RAF in 1957.

== Blackburn and British Aerospace ==
Surplus to RAF requirements, Holme was leased to Blackburn Aircraft Ltd for use as a test base from 1958. The location was convenient for Blackburn's main factory at Brough Aerodrome, only 16 miles (25.7 km) away, where the runway was not long enough for use by the new aircraft Blackburn was then working on, most especially the Blackburn Buccaneer. The use of Holme passed through Blackburn's acquisition by Hawker Siddeley, and subsequently British Aerospace, until the latter ceased use of Holme in December 1983.

== Current use ==
Most of the buildings still stand, and are used as an industrial estate. A memorial to the wartime squadrons stands at the main entrance.
