= Tony Firth =

New Zealand manufacturer, aviator, and military leader

Guy Mortimer Firth (15 April 1907 – 26 December 1980), always known as Tony Firth, was a New Zealand manufacturer, aviator, and military leader. He co-founded Firth Concrete with his elder brother Ted.

Firth was born in Auckland in 1907. His father was the inventor and manufacturer Ned Firth and his mother was Blanch Emily Banks. Clifton Firth (1904–1980) and Ted Firth (1905–1978) were his elder brothers. Josiah Firth was his grandfather.
