= Geoff Williams (painter) =

Maltexo Engineer, 2008, by Geoff Williams

Geoff Williams (born 1957) is a New Zealand contemporary realist artist, based in the southern South Island city of Dunedin, Otago. He is best known for his meticulously rendered acrylic paintings, encompassing nudes, landscapes and still life. He started his career as a sign writer and screen printer in his father's sign shop where he was exposed to other New Zealand artists. He has been working as a full-time artist since the mid-1990s.

Significant recognition was afforded Williams by art critic John Daly-Peoples in the National Business Review. Peoples wrote

"Geoff Williams' paintings of landscapes, still life and nudes are filled with colour and light. The surface of these works are alive with thousands of tiny brush strokes that combine to make objects which shimmer and dance. There is an impressionistic quality to the work that recalls the pointillism of Seurat and the feverish brush strokes of van Gogh. Each work appears to have an underlying life force, the small painterly gestures animating the objects and their backgrounds. The artist also renders the varying textures of the objects he paints."
