= Brendon Diamanti =

New Zealand cricketer (born 1981)

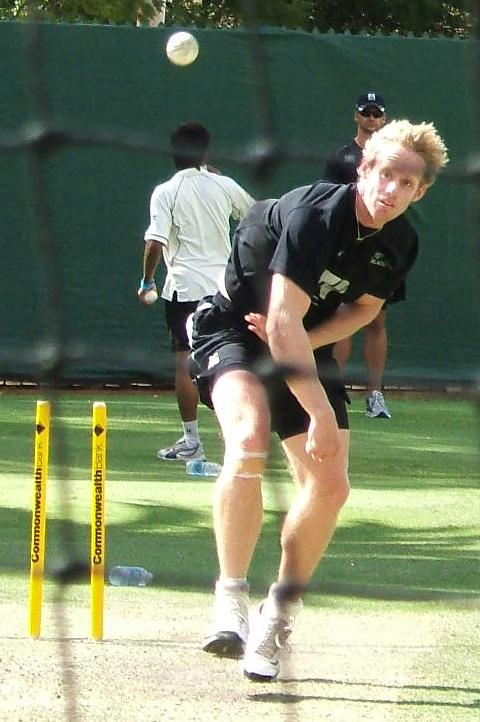

Personal information
- Full name: Brendon John Diamanti
- Born: 30 April 1981 (age 45); Blenheim, Marlborough, New Zealand
- Height: 6 ft 2 in (1.88 m)
- Batting: Right-handed
- Bowling: Right arm medium
- Role: All-rounder

International information
- National side: New Zealand
- Only ODI (cap 153): 13 February 2009 v Australia
- Only T20I (cap 39): 9 June 2009 v South Africa

Domestic team information
- Years: Team
- 2003/04–2010/11: Central Districts
- 2011/12–2014/15: Canterbury

Career statistics
Competition	ODI	T20I	FC	LA
Matches	1	1	27	69
Runs scored	26	–	952	713
Batting average	–	–	25.72	30.77
100s/50s	0/0	–	2/3	1/6
Top score	26*	–	136	102*
Balls bowled	12	12	4,312	2,770
Wickets	0	0	57	75
Bowling average	–	–	34.77	29.25
5 wickets in innings	–	–	3	1
10 wickets in match	–	–	1	0
Best bowling	–	–	6/73	5/58
Catches/stumpings	1/–	0/–	7/–	23/–
- Source: Cricinfo, 12 May 2017

Brendon John Diamanti (born 30 April 1981) is a former New Zealand international cricketer who played limited over cricket internationally and for Central Districts and Canterbury domestically. Diamanti was awarded a player's contract for 2006-07.

== International career ==
On 21 January 2009, Diamanti was selected for the New Zealand squad for the one-day series against Australia in February 2009, and made his debut in the final match of the series on 13 February 2009. Diamanti played in the 2009 ICC Champions Trophy.
