= Sarah Dougherty =

Sarah (Sally) Dougherty (c.1818 – 7 November 1898) was a New Zealand community leader, nurse, boarding house keeper and gardener. She was born in Derry, Ireland on c.1818. Dougherty lived in Cutters Bay, Port Underwood during the Wairau Affray and afterwards in Wellington.

Sarah was known as Sally, and also had a daughter called Sarah. (see Manson, C. (1974). The story of a New Zealand family : The beginnings.)
