= Chodron =

Chodron or Chödrön is a surname. Notable people with the surname include:

- Alphonse Chodron de Courcel (1835–1919), French diplomat and politician
- Geoffroy Chodron de Courcel (1912–1992), French diplomat
- Bernadette Chirac (née Chodron de Courcel), spouse of Jacques Chirac
- Pema Chödrön, American woman who was ordained as a Buddhist nun in the Tibetan lineage of Buddhism in 1981
- Thubten Chodron, American Tibetan Buddhist nun and a central figure in reinstating the Bhikshuni
