= List of senators of Seine-et-Oise =

Redistribution of Seine-et-Oise in 1968

The following is a list of senators of Seine-et-Oise, people who have represented the former department of Seine-et-Oise in the Senate of France. The department was dissolved in 1968, with most of its territory becoming the new departments of Essonne, Yvelines and Val-d'Oise.

== Third Republic ==
- Charles Gilbert-Boucher (1876–1886)
- Léon Say (1876–1889)
- Ernest Feray (1876–1891)
- Hippolyte Maze (1886–1891)
- Louis Journault (1886–1892)
- Paul Decauville (1890–1900)
- Paul Maret (1891–1906)
- Ernest Hamel (1892–1898)
- Alphonse Chodron de Courcel (1892–1919)
- Frédéric Bonnefille (1898–1909)
- Louis Legrand (1900–1909)
- Arsène Collet (1907)
- Henri Poirson (1907–1923)
- Camille Ferdinand Dreyfus (1909–1915)
- Émile Aimond (1909–1917)
- Hugues Le Roux (1920–1925)
- Maurice Guesnier (1920–1927)
- Georges Berthoulat (1920–1930)
- Honoré Cornudet des Chaumettes (1924–1936)
- Louis Amiard (1926–1935)
- Georges Leredu (1927–1936)
- Louis Muret (1930–1936)
- Paul Brasseau (1936–1940)
- Maurice Dormann (1936–1940)
- Gaston Henry-Haye (1936–1940)
- Charles Reibel (1936–1940)

== Fourth Republic ==
- Alain Poher (1946–1948 et de 1952–1959)
- Serge Lefranc (1946–1948)
- Pierre Pujol (1946–1952)
- Marie Roche (1946–1952)
- Jacqueline Thome-Patenôtre (1946–1959)
- Antoine Demusois (1948–1951)
- André Diethelm (1948–1951)
- Gabriel Bolifraud (1948–1952)
- Pierre Loison (1948–1952)
- Louis Namy (1951–1959)
- Xavier Pidoux de La Maduère (1951–1959)
- Antoine Boutonnat (1952–1958)
- Pierre Commin (1952–1958)
- Roger Lachèvre (1952–1959)
- René Boudet (1958–1959)
- Auguste Chrétienne (1958–1959)

== Fifth Republic ==
Senators served one term under the French Fifth Republic, from 1959 to 1968, after which the department was dissolved.

Senator	Party
Aimé Bergeal	French Section of the Workers' International (SFIO)
Édouard Bonnefous	Democratic and Socialist Union of the Resistance (UDSR)
Adolphe Chauvin	Popular Republican Movement (MRP)
Roger Lachèvre	National Centre of Independents and Peasants (CNIP)
Louis Namy	French Communist Party (PCF)
Alain Poher	Popular Republican Movement (MRP)
Pierre Prost	Union for the New Republic (UNR)
Jacques Soufflet	Union for the New Republic (UNR)
