= Geoffroy Chodron de Courcel =

French noble, soldier, and diplomat (1912–1992)

Chodron de Courcel arms

Baron Geoffroy Chodron de Courcel (11 September 1912, Tours - 9 December 1992, Paris), was a French nobleman, soldier and diplomat.

He was Aide-de-Camp to Charles de Gaulle in 1940 and escaped to England with the General on 17 June 1940 with the help of General Sir Edward Spears. Geoffroy Chodron was the first officer to sign up with the Free French Forces, established by De Gaulle when he was in London.

From 1941 he served as De Gaulle’s private secretary and would later command a squadron of the 1er régiment de marche de Spahis marocains (1st Spahi Regiment), formed out of other units.

After the War, he returned to the French Foreign Ministry before holding several important appointments, including that of Ambassador to the United Kingdom from 16 March 1962 until 20 April 1972.

== Family ==
The Chodron de Courcel family, who were landed gentry (or petite noblesse), were created Barons by Emperor Napoleon III.

He was the only son of Baron Louis de Chodron de Courcel (1874-1962), by his wife Alice Lambert-Champy (1886-1967); S.E. Baron Geoffroy Chodron de Courcel had three sisters:

- Louise: married Xavier Baudon de Mony
- Elisabeth: married Olivier, comte de Chastellux
- Henriette: married Louis de Lasteyrie du Saillant, marquis de Lasteyrie.

His grandfather, Baron Alphonse Chodron de Courcel, was French Ambassador to London from 1894 until 1898.

== Honours ==
- Grand-croix de la Légion d'honneur
- Compagnon de la Libération

== See also ==
- Chodron de Courcel family
- Bernadette Chirac
