= Rob Fisher (barrister) =

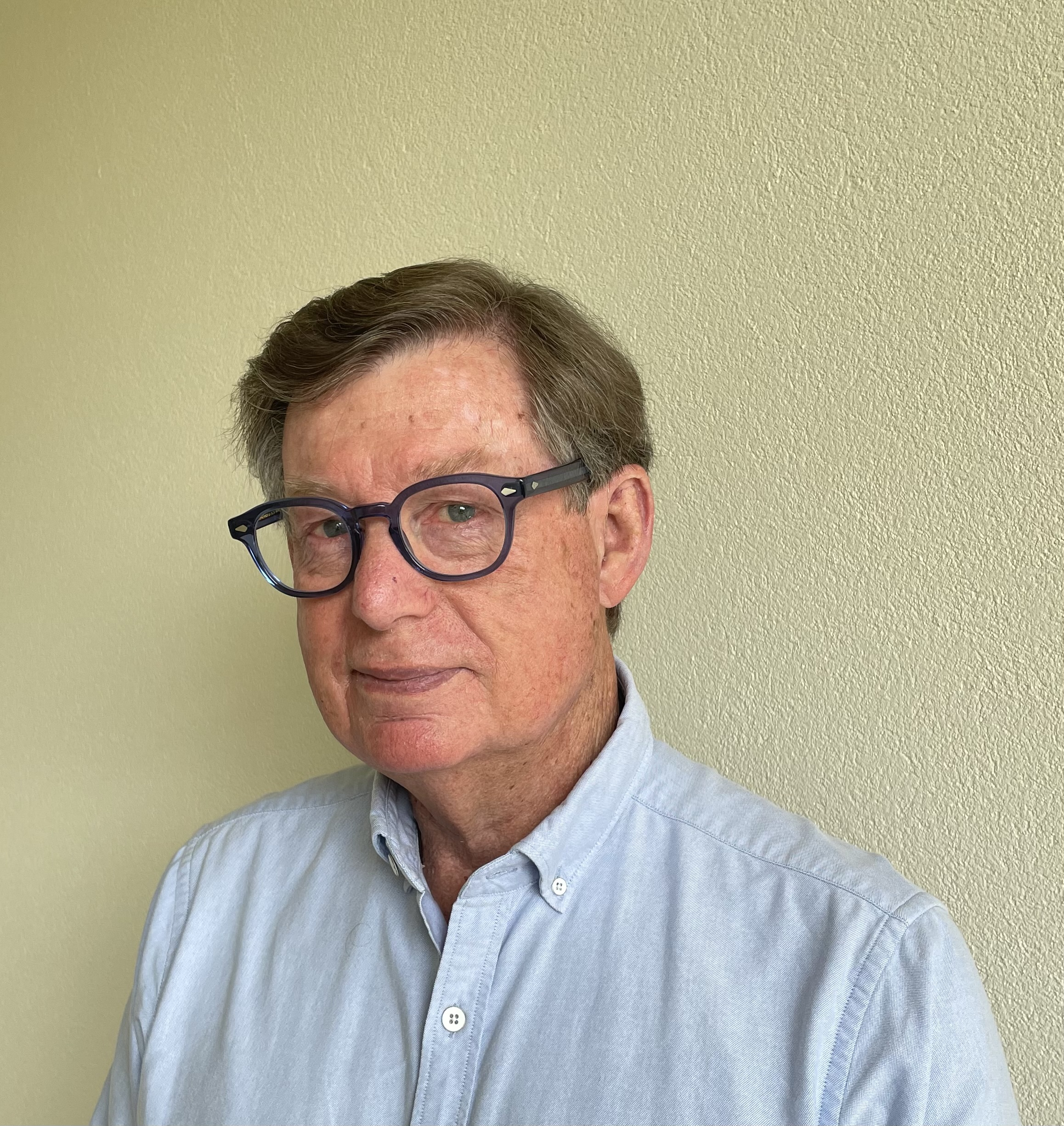
Photograph of Rob Fisher

Robert Anthony Fisher ONZM is a retired New Zealand barrister and former chairman and partner of the law firm Simpson Grierson. He was legal counsel at the Auckland Transition Agency, the body responsible for the reorganization of local government in the Auckland region. He specialised in resource management law. While he was practicing, Fisher was recommended as a leading lawyer in his field in the International Who's Who of Environmental Lawyers 2009, International Who's Who of Business Lawyers 2009 and in the Guide to the World's Leading Environment Lawyers 2009. Fisher was the 2010 Barrister of the Year in the New Zealand Law Awards, and was appointed an Officer of the New Zealand Order of Merit, for services to sport, in the 2011 Queen’s Birthday Honours.

Fisher was a member of several boards and organisations:

- Board of Genesis Energy
- Board of Sport and Recreation New Zealand (SPARC)
- Eden Park Trust
- Institute of Directors in New Zealand
- Resource Management Law Association
- New Zealand Business Roundtable

He had a long career in rugby administration, both nationally and internationally, including as Chairman of Auckland Rugby Union, New Zealand Rugby Union Vice-Chairman of the International Rugby Board and as a board member of Rugby World Cup Limited. Fisher is a Life Member of New Zealand Rugby, Auckland Rugby, Auckland University Rugby and the Eden Park Trust. In 2023 he was recognised with the Steinlager Salver for outstanding contribution to New Zealand Rugby.
