= Cathy Dewes =

New Zealand Māori language advocate

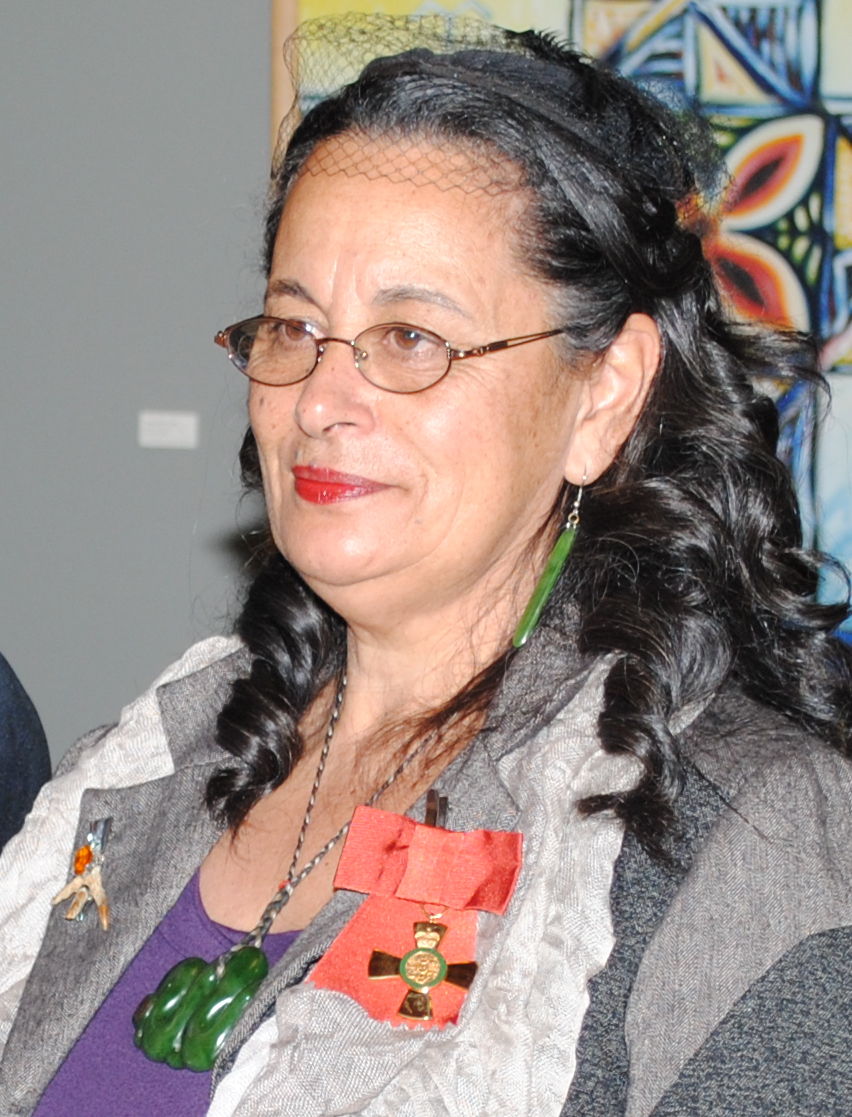
Dewes in 2011

Cathy Moana Dewes ONZM is a New Zealand Māori language advocate. She has been a leader in Māori language and education since the 1970s.

== Early years and education ==
Dewes spent her early years living on the East Cape and Bay of Plenty where she consistently heard the te reo Māori language. Both of Dewes's parents were teachers and she has three brothers. Dewes affiliates to Te Arawa and Ngāti Porou,

The family moved to Wellington in 1966 where Dewes was appointed Head Girl at Wellington Girls' College in 1968. Despite learning French, German, Italian and Latin at high school, Dewes was told by the principal that she was not allowed to study Māori.

Dewes achieved a degree in Māori from Victoria University of Wellington. While there she helped establish the Te Reo Māori Society which pushed for the promotion of the Māori language including news content on television and radio. Dewes is a trained teacher.

She and her husband, Rawiri Rangitauira, have six children. Her husband died in 2014.

== Career ==
Through her involvement in the Te Reo Māori Society, Dewes helped collect 30,000 signatures for the Māori Language petition presented to New Zealand Parliament in 1972. The petition called for the introduction of Māori language in schools. Dewes and her peers established Māori Language Day in 1975 which later became Te Wiki o te Reo Māori (Māori Language Week).

Dewes was a founding member of the Kura Kaupapa Māori schools movement in New Zealand. She was chair of Te Runanganui o Kura Kaupapa Māori, the national body for Kura Kaupapa Māori.

In 1985, Dewes established Te Kura Kaupapa Māori o Ruamata in Rotorua, one of New Zealand's first Maori language schools. She has been principal of the school since its inception, including working 10 years in an unpaid role until the school secured government funding.

Dewes was the first woman in 50 years to be appointed to the Te Arawa Māori Trust Board in 1995. Her iwi, Ngāti Rangitihi, supported her appointment and she won her seat. This was despite the trustees' objection and a High Court ruling enabled Dewes to be appointed.

In 2016, Dewes was appointed to the Ministry of Education's Advisory Group to review education funding systems. She was appointed to the Te Mātāwai advisory board by Hon Te Ururoa Flavell in the same year.

=== Recognition ===
Dewes was awarded an honorary doctorate from Waikato University in 2011. In the 2011 Queen's Birthday Honours, she was appointed an Officer of the New Zealand Order of Merit, for services to Māori. Dewes was interviewed on Radio New Zealand after receiving her Queen's Birthday Honour.

In 2012, Dewes was featured on Television New Zealand's Waka Huia programme. She was also featured on Māori Television's programme, Ngā Tāngata Taumata Rau, in 2016.
