= 2011 Birthday Honours (New Zealand) =

Awards list for New Zealand

2011 Queen's Birthday Honours
- Previous: 2011 Special Honours; Next: 2011 Special Honours
- Type: New Zealand royal honours: New Zealand Order of Merit; Queen's Service Order; Queen's Service Medal; Distinguished Service Decoration
- Date: 6 June 2011
- Country: New Zealand

Highlights
- Total recipients: 169

The 2011 Queen's Birthday Honours in New Zealand, celebrating the official birthday of Queen Elizabeth II, were appointments made by the Queen in her right as Queen of New Zealand, on the advice of the New Zealand government, to various orders and honours to reward and highlight good works by New Zealanders. They were announced on 6 June 2011.

The recipients of honours are listed here as they were styled before their new honour.

== New Zealand Order of Merit ==
=== Dame Companion (DNZM) ===
- Rosemary Anne Horton QSO QSM – of Auckland. For services to philanthropy.
- Katerina Te Heikoko Mataira CNZM – of Hamilton. For services to the Māori language.
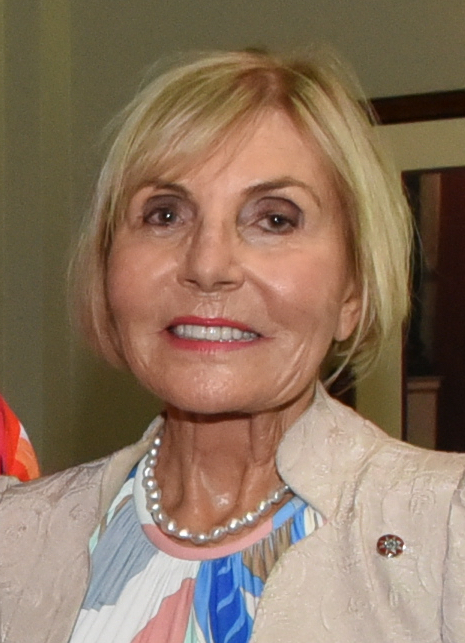
Dame Rosie Horton

=== Knight Companion (KNZM) ===
- David John Graham CBE ED – of Auckland. For services to education and sport.
- The Honourable Justice Robert Grant Hammond – of Wellington. For services to the law.
- Graeme Thomas Harrison – of Wellington. For services to business.
- Daniel Patrick Higgins ONZM – of Palmerston North. For services to philanthropy and the community.
- James Hay Wallace ONZM – of Auckland. For services to the arts. (Note: Knighthood cancelled and annulled in 2023.)
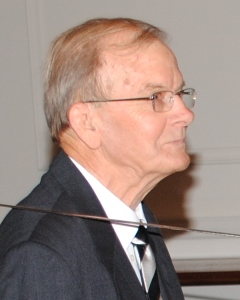
Sir John Graham

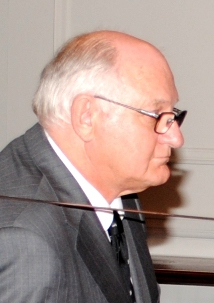
Sir Grant Hammond

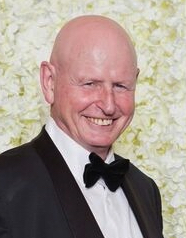
Sir Graeme Harrison

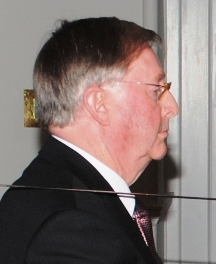
Sir Pat Higgins

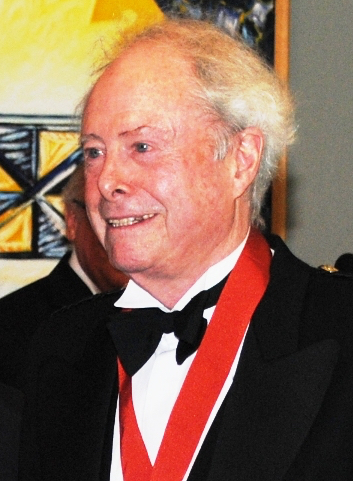
James Wallace

=== Companion (CNZM) ===
- The Honourable John Archibald Banks QSO – of Auckland. For services to local-body affairs.
- Howard George Broad – of Wellington. For services as Commissioner of Police.
- Herbert John Te Kauru Clarke – of Lower Hutt. For services to Māori.
- Matteo de Nora – of Monaco. For services to yachting and medicine.
- Christopher Keith Doig OBE – of Christchurch. For services to the arts and sport.
- Kenneth Mark Ford – of Auckland. For services to local government.
- Margaret Phyllis Elsie Horsburgh – of Auckland. For services to health.
- Roger Lawrence Kerr – of Wellington. For services to business.
- Boudewijn Huibrecht Klap (Boyd Klap) QSO – of Wellington. For services to business and the community.
- Derek Te Ariki Te Whetu Takatahi Morehu – of Rotorua. For services to Māori.
- Christopher Wilton Parkin – of Wellington. For services to business and the arts.
- Kerry Leigh Prendergast – of Wellington. For services to local-body affairs.
- William Newton Sheat OBE – of Lower Hutt. For services to the arts.
- Professor Warren Perry Tate – of Kaikorai. For services to science.
- John Henry Whitehead – of Wellington. For services as secretary to the Treasury.

Honorary

- Richard Lee Armitage – of Vienna, Virginia, United States of America. For services to New Zealand–United States of America relations.
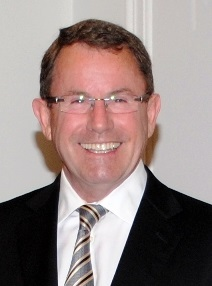
John Banks

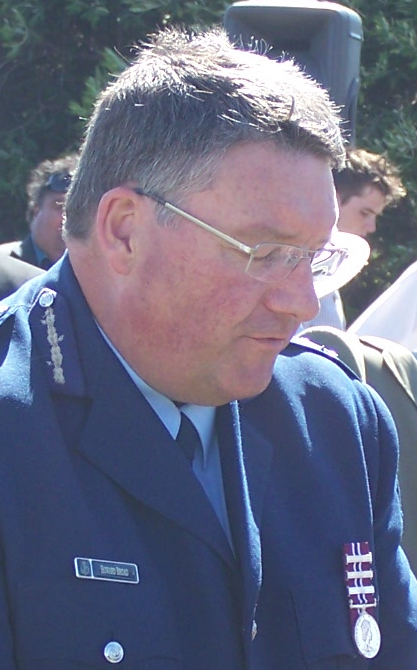
Howard Broad

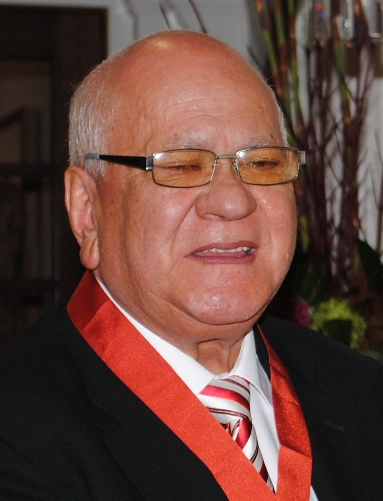
John Clarke

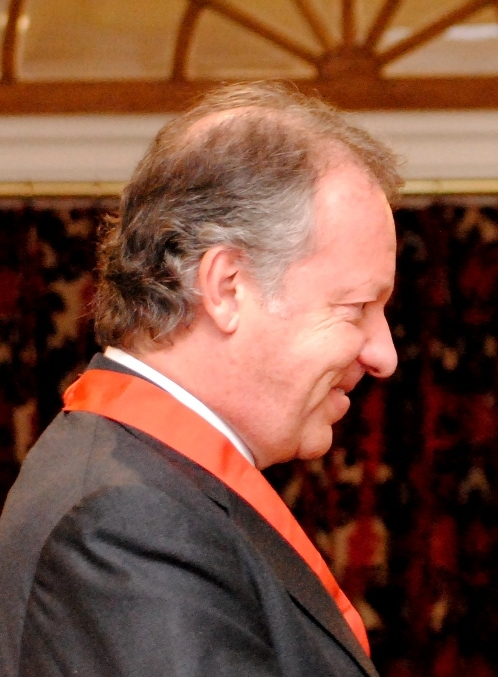
Matteo de Nora

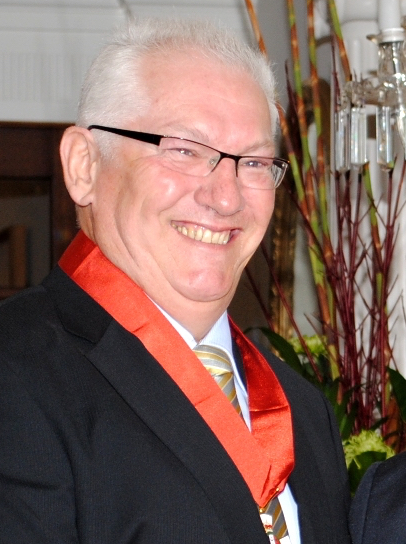
Chris Doig

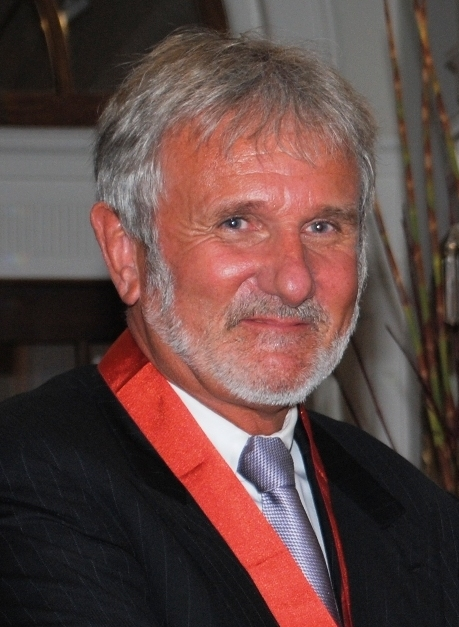
Mark Ford

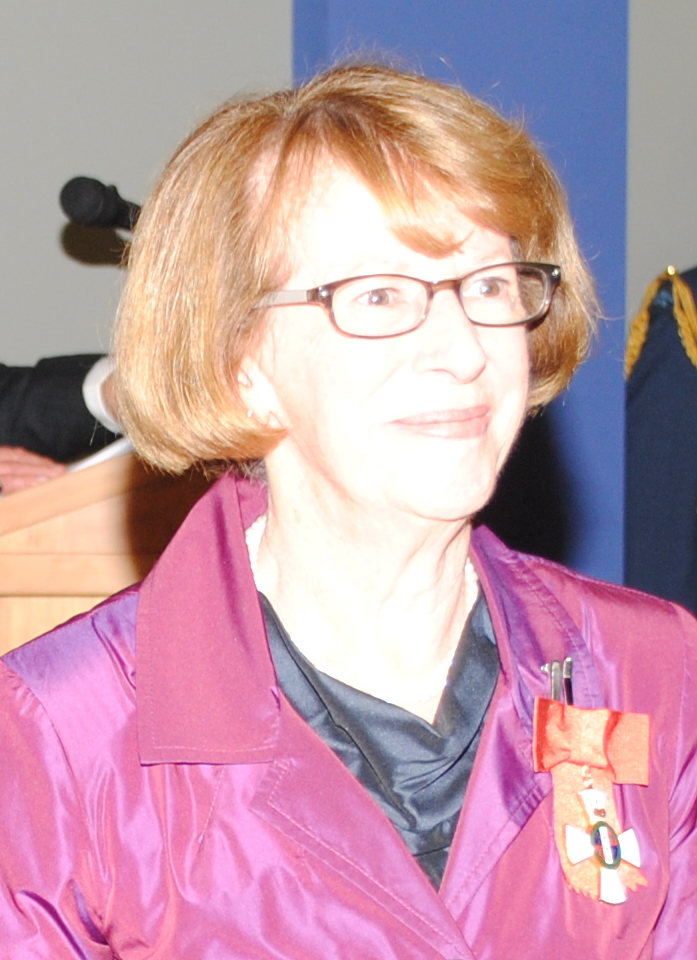
Margaret Horsburgh

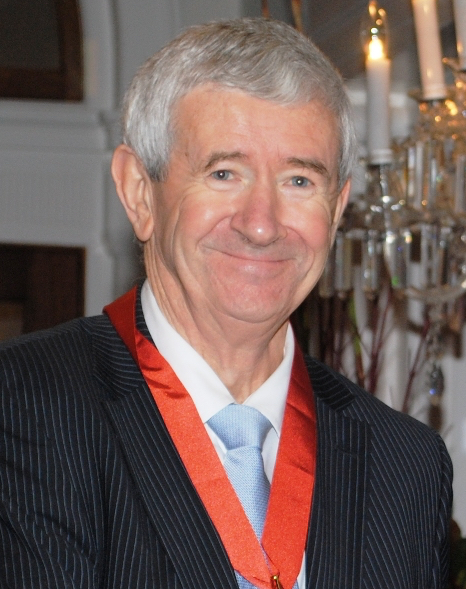
Roger Kerr

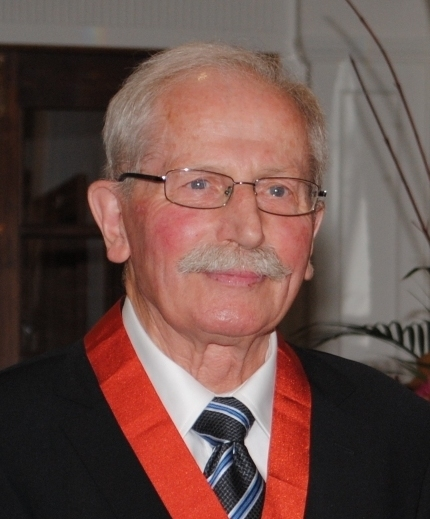
Boyd Klap

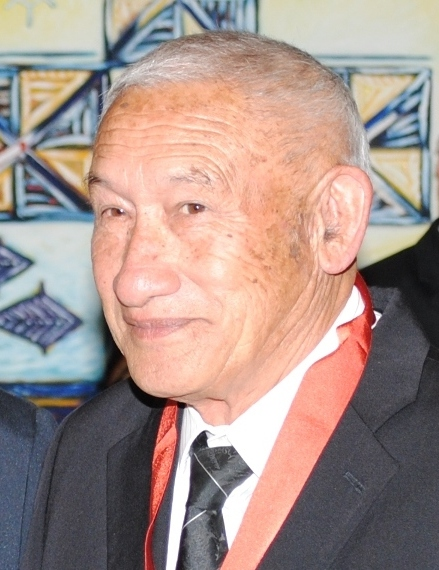
Derek Morehu

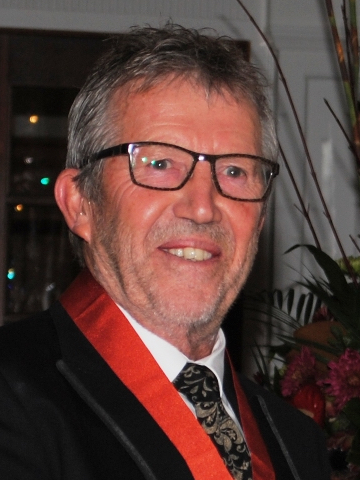
Chris Parkin

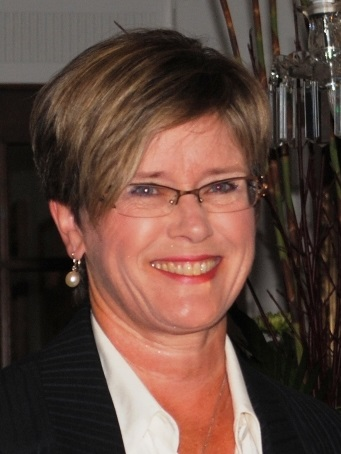
Kerry Prendergast

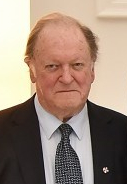
Bill Sheat

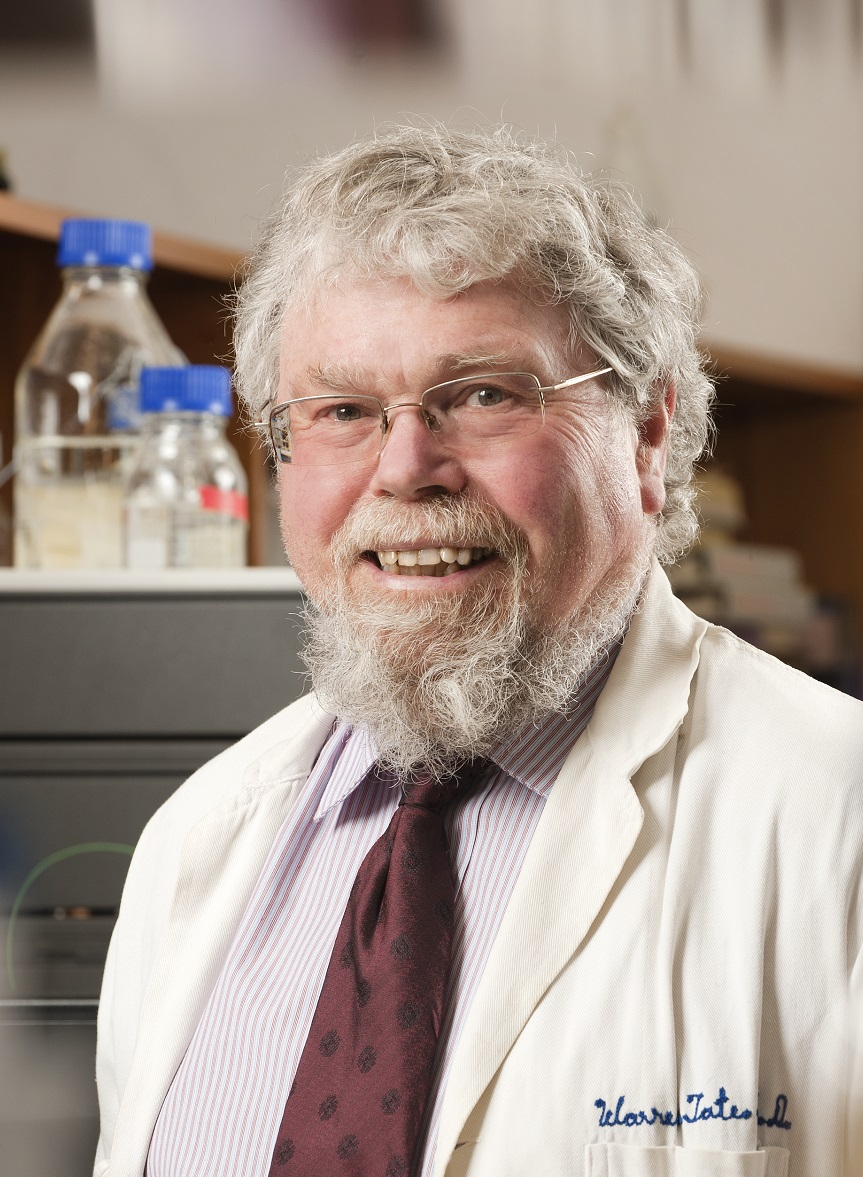
Warren Tate

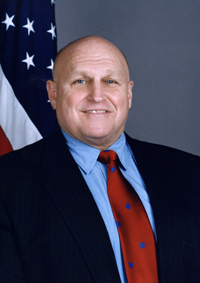
Richard Armitage

=== Officer (ONZM) ===
- Ruth Ellina Aitken – of Paeroa. For services to netball.
- Professor Emeritus Martin Hugh Devlin – of Waikanae. For services to education.
- Catherine Moana Dewes – of Rotorua. For services to Māori.
- Robert Anthony Fisher – of Auckland. For services to sport.
- Stephen Paul Fleming – of Wellington. For services to cricket.
- Dr Peter James Gow – of Auckland. For services to health.
- John Allan Clinton Hattie – of Melbourne, Victoria, Australia. For services to education.
- Dr John Stephen Hellstrom – of Picton. For services to biosecurity.
- Diedre Allison Irons MBE – of Wellington. For services to music
- Judith Mary Kirk – of Taupō. For services to the community.
- Dr Jack Neville Parle – of Hamilton. For services to agricultural science.
- Professor Ronald James Paterson – of Auckland. For services to health.
- Nolan Tariho Rimitiriu Raihania – of Tokomaru Bay. For services to Māori.
- Dr Roland Elliston Rowland – of Palmerston North. For services to genetic research.
- Professor Swee Thong Tan – of Wellington. For services to medicine.
- John Frederick Turner JP – of Lumsden. For services to the meat industry.
- Daniel Luca Vettori – of Auckland. For services to cricket.
- Rea Geoffrey Wikaira JP – of Auckland. For services to health administration.
- Casey Williams – of Hamilton. For services to netball.
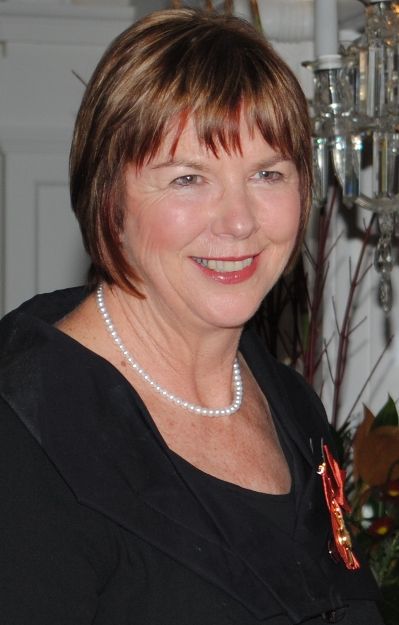
Ruth Aitken

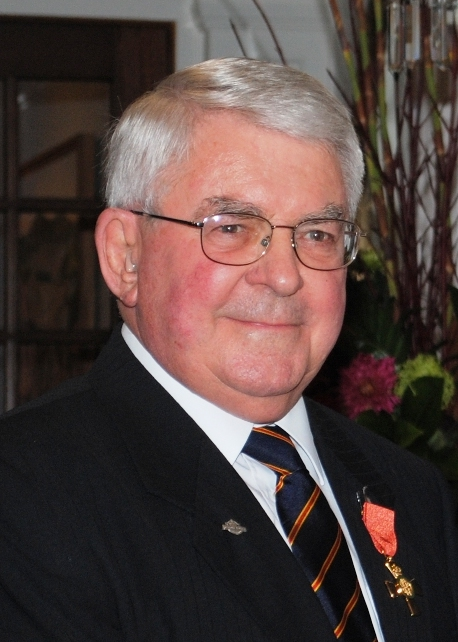
Martin Devlin

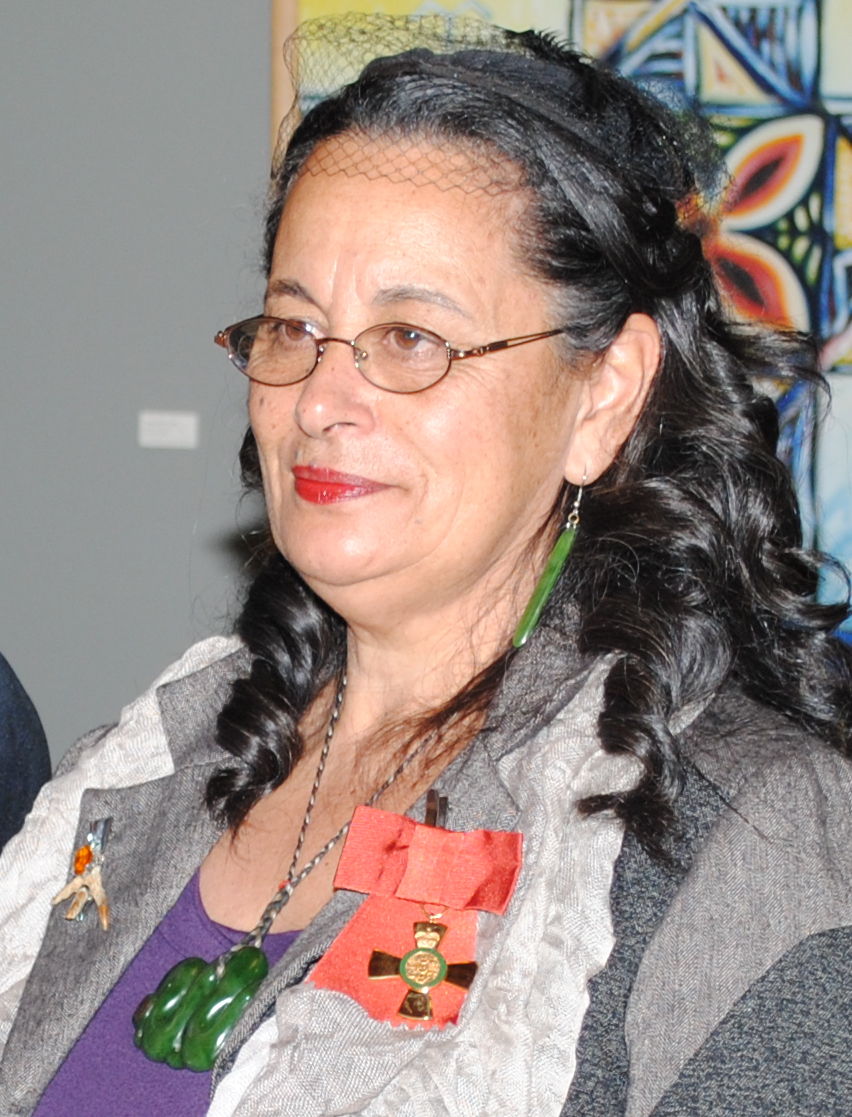
Cathy Dewes

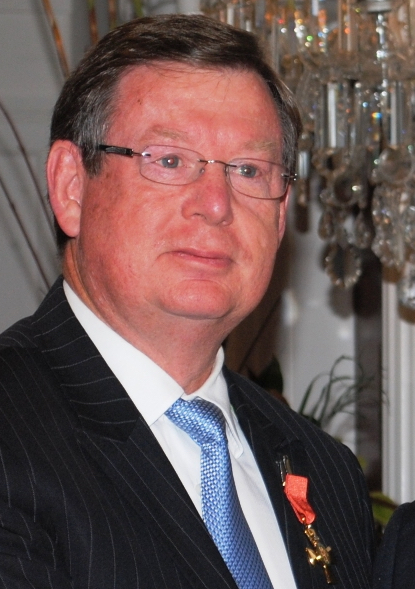
Rob Fisher

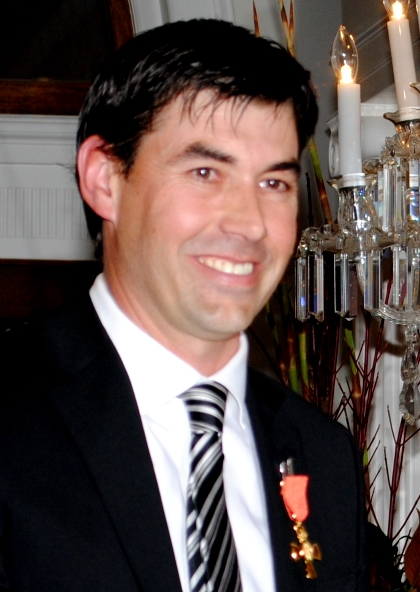
Stephen Fleming

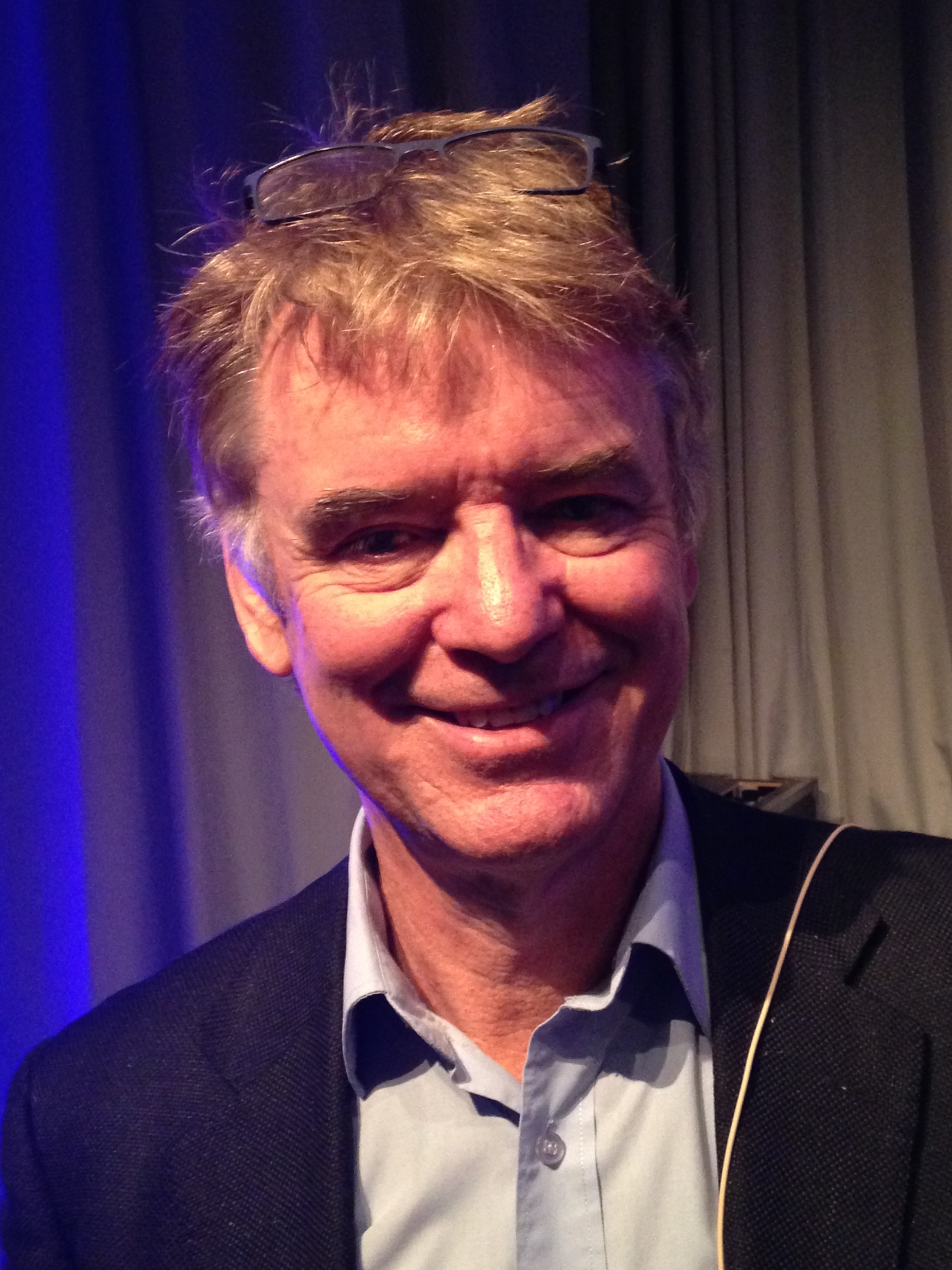
John Hattie

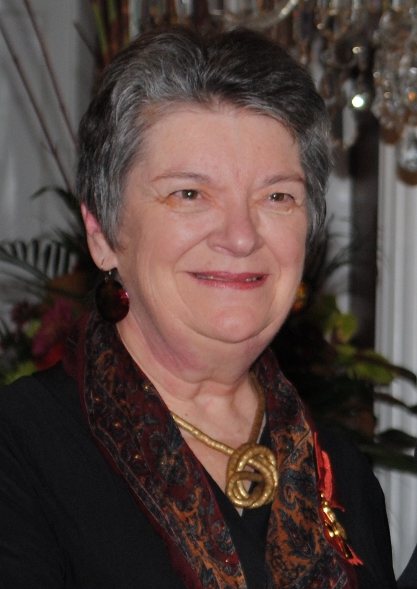
Diedre Irons

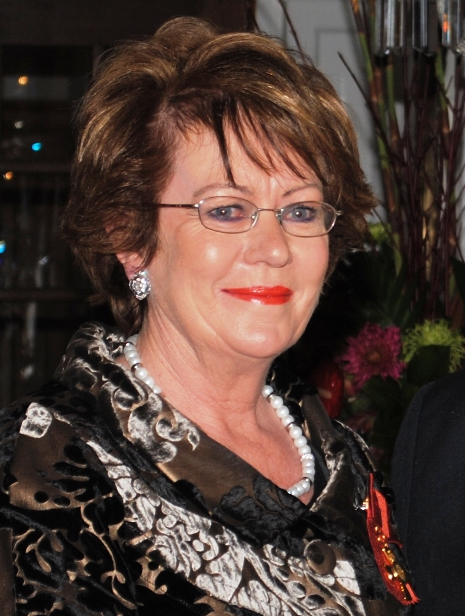
Judith Kirk

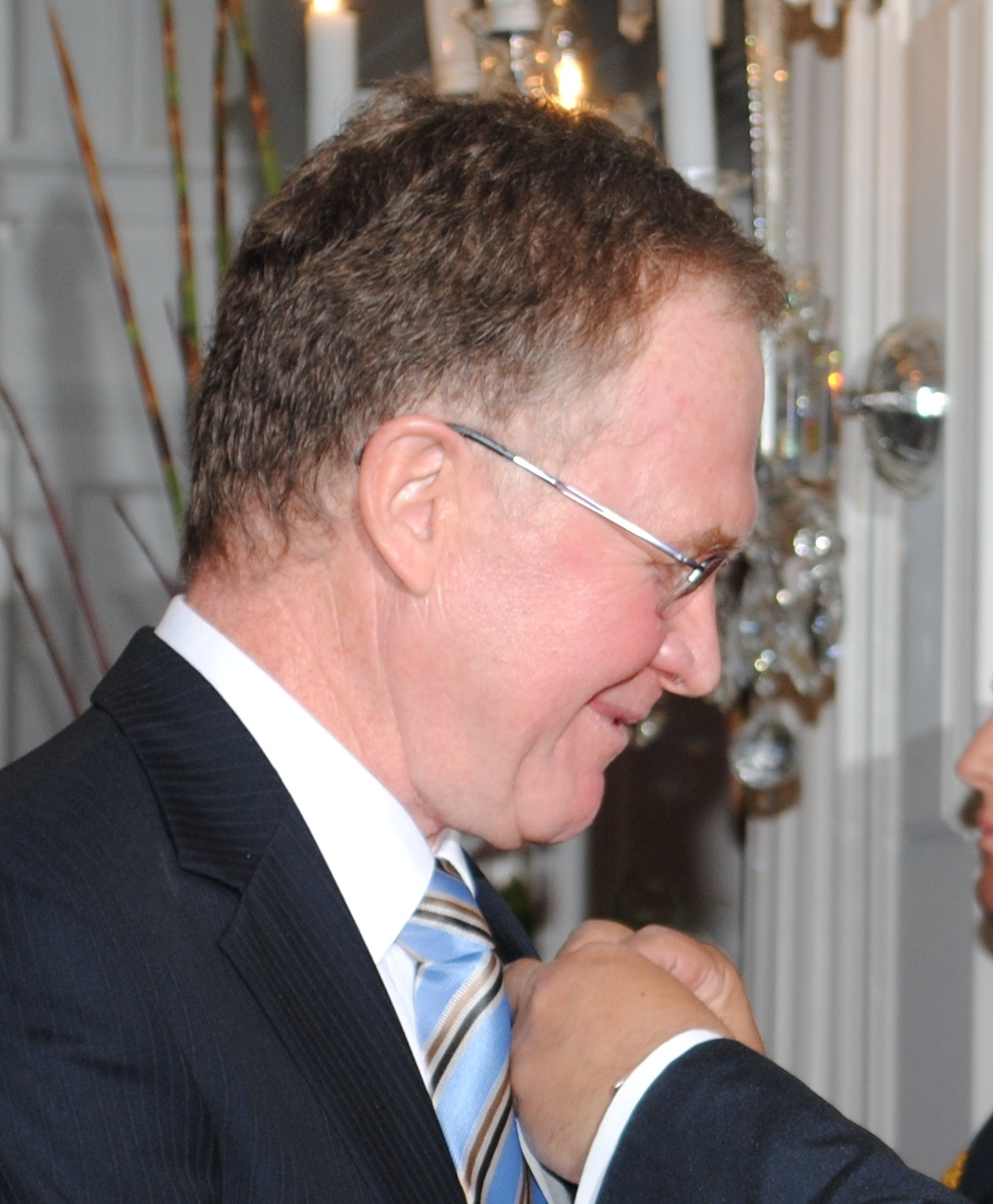
Ron Paterson

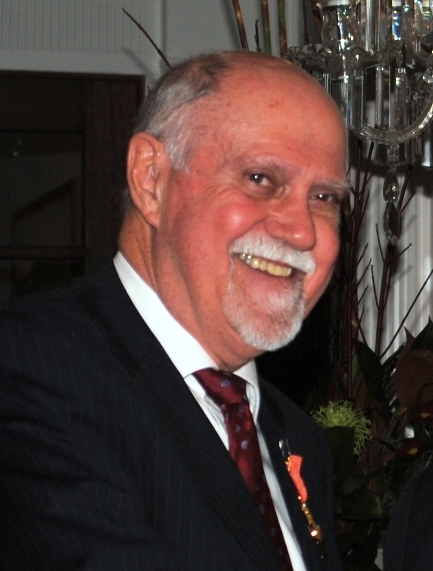
Al Rowland

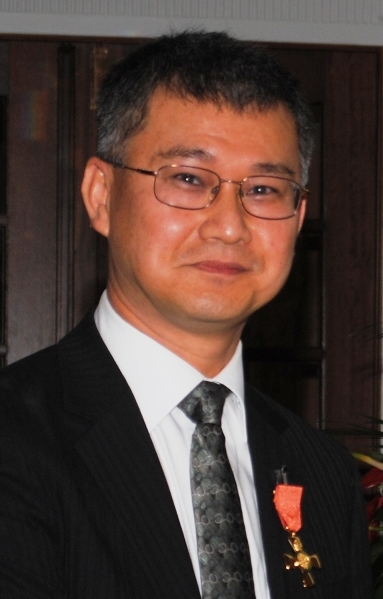
Swee Tan

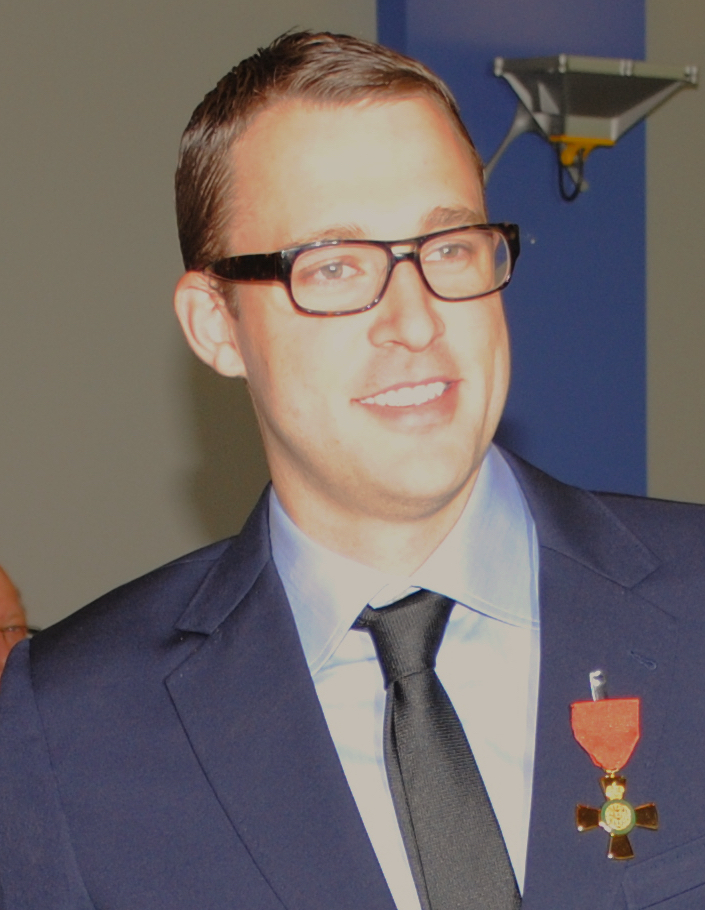
Daniel Vettori

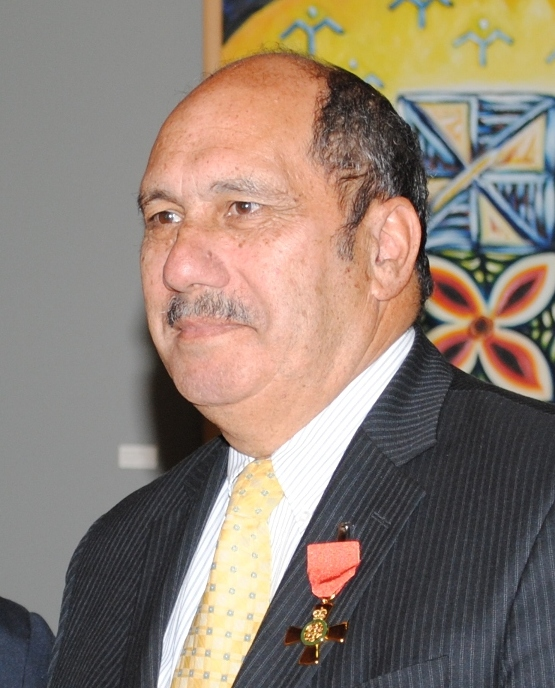
Rea Wikaira

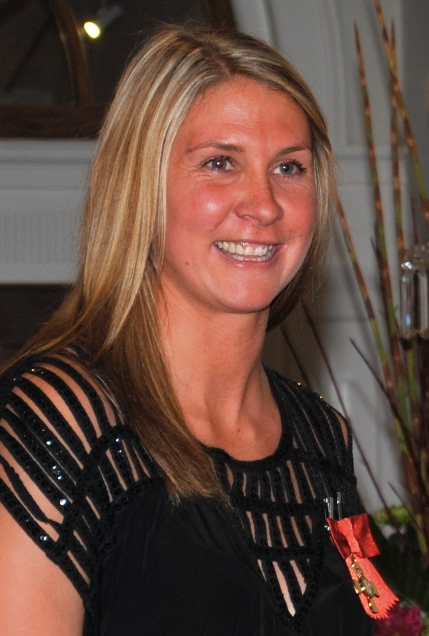
Casey Williams

=== Member (MNZM) ===
- Therese Ann Angelo – of Christchurch. For services to museums.
- Ratapu Hori Te Awa – of Huntly. For services to Māori.
- Roka Hurihia Cameron – of Ōpōtiki. For services to Māori.
- Sean Pero MacPherson Cameron – of Pacific Pines, Gold Coast, Queensland, Australia. For services to basketball.
- James Clovis Clad – of Washington, D.C., United States of America. For services to New Zealand–United States of America relations.
- Barry George Cleal JP – of Auckland. For services to rowing.
- William John Cyrus Dooley – of Oamaru. For services to the restoration of historic buildings.
- Robyn May Duncan – of Feilding. For services to youth.
- Brian Paul Ellis – of Auckland. For services to the music industry.
- Mark Christopher Farnsworth – of Mangawhai. For services to the community.
- Kenneth James Gilligan – of Napier. For services to business.
- Ngaire Anne Guy – of Tauranga. For service to music.
- Adam James Hall – of Dunedin. For services to sport.
- Jenny Gwynndd Harper – of Christchurch. For services to the arts.
- David Harold Ward Hartnell – of Auckland. For services to entertainment.
- Richard Bruce Hawke – of Christchurch. For services to pipe bands.
- John Langley Hawkesby – of Auckland. For services to broadcasting and the community.
- Dr Rodger William Hilliker – of Temuka. For services as a general practitioner.
- Peter Malcolm Jackson – of Kaitaia. For services to journalism.
- Dr Guy Elwyn Jansen – of Porirua. For services to music.
- Gregory Kenneth Jenks – of Tauranga. For services to conservation.
- Michael Johnson – of Auckland. For services to Paralympic sport.
- Josephine Tui Faith Karanga – of Whakatāne. For services to Māori.
- Jason Mark Kerrison – of Auckland. For services to music.
- Jennifer Cheryl King – of Wellington. For services to the Asian community.
- Sionepaea Kumitau – of Auckland. For services to the Niuean community.
- James Robert Law – of Featherston. For services to the community.
- Daphne Tania Luke – of Ōtaki. For services to business and the community.
- Alfred Lewis McIvor – of Christchurch. For services to diabetes research.
- Leonard James Murray – of Bronte, New South Wales, Australia. For services to tourism.
- Keith James Neylon – of Invercargill. For services to agriculture.
- Diana Elizabeth Parkes – of Lower Hutt. For services to textile art.
- Valentino Pereira – of Wellington. For services to the Pacific community.
- Kuini Moehau Reedy – of Gisborne. For services to Māori.
- Nonnita Margaret Rees – of Wellington. For services to the arts.
- John Cecil Roadley – of Blenheim. For services to the dairy industry.
- Sister Marie Elizabeth Roche – of Upper Hutt. For services to the community
- Ann Mary Ruth – of London, United Kingdom. For services to drama.
- Allan Arrol Scott – of Blenheim. For services to viticulture.
- Lois Ann Scott – of Dunedin. For services to the community.
- Dr Kantha Madhavji Soni – of Auckland. For services to medicine and the community.
- Ivan Carl Sutherland – of Blenheim. For services to rowing and viticulture.
- Roger Neil Taylor – of Nelson. For services to the arts.
- Isabella Huihana Tedcastle – of Auckland. For services to the community.
- Jonathan Robert White – of Whakatāne. For services to the arts and the community.
- Jo-anne Edna Mary Wilkinson – of Leigh. For services to youth.
- Steven Wai Cheung Wong – of Auckland. For services to the Chinese community.
- Laurence Edward Zwimpfer – of Wellington. For services to information technology.
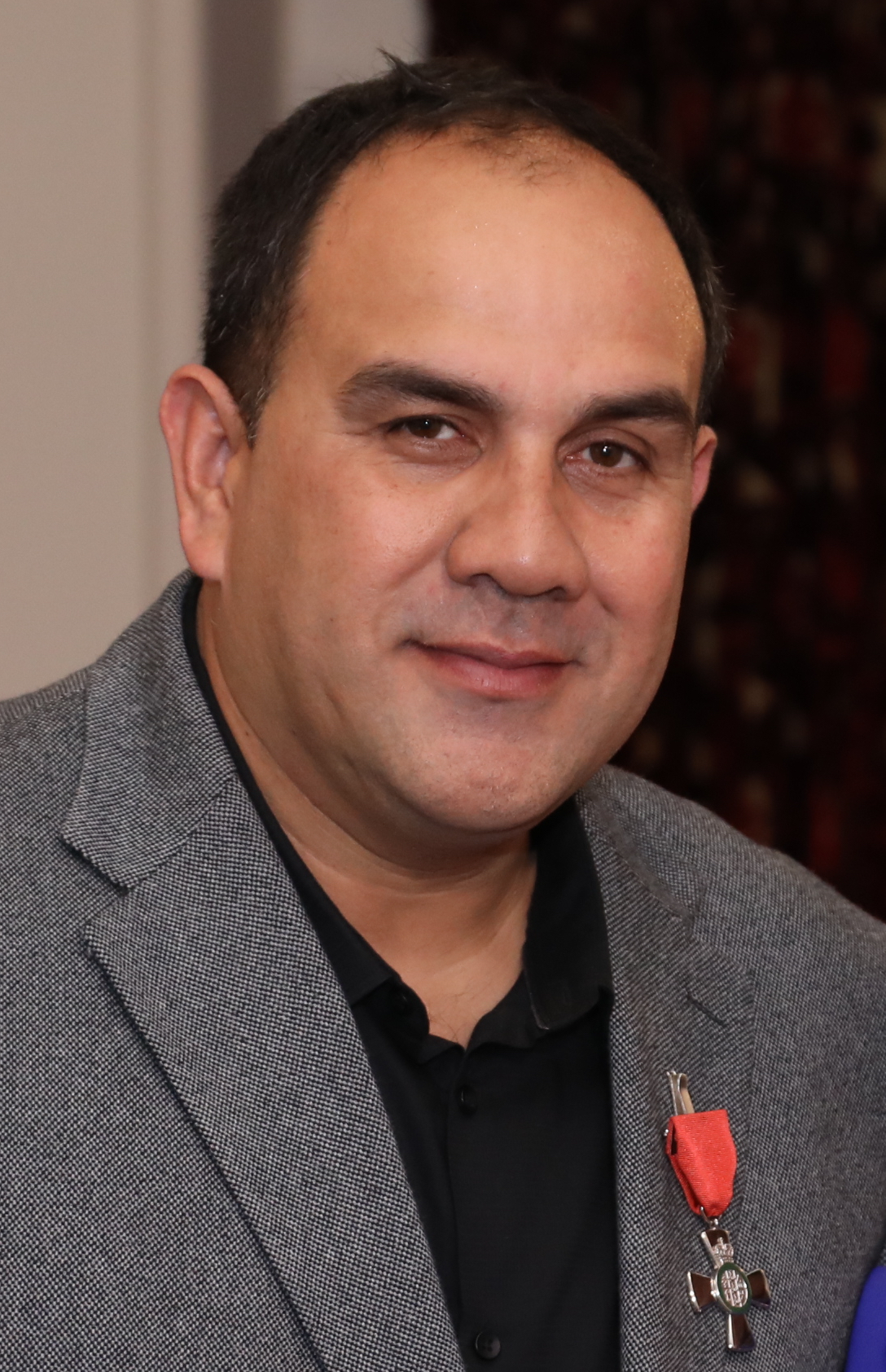
Pero Cameron

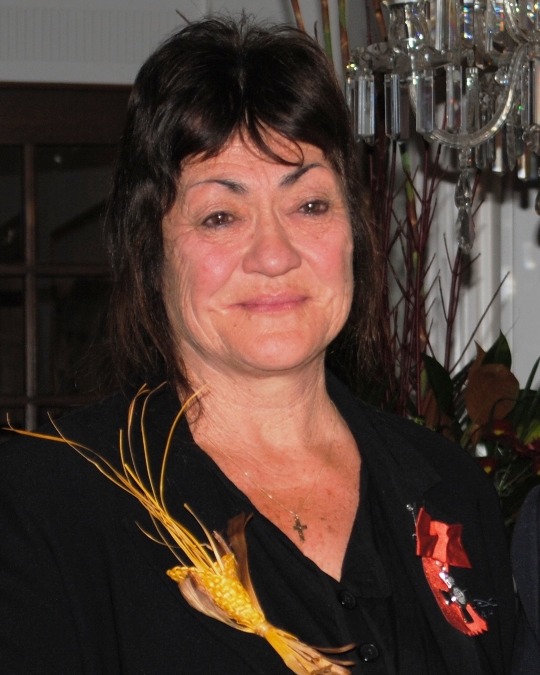
Roka Ngarimu-Cameron

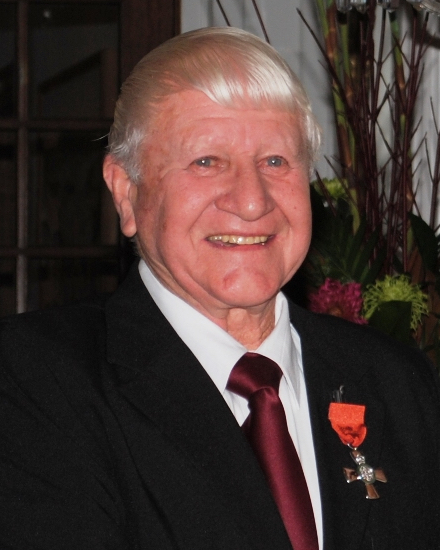
Bill Dooley

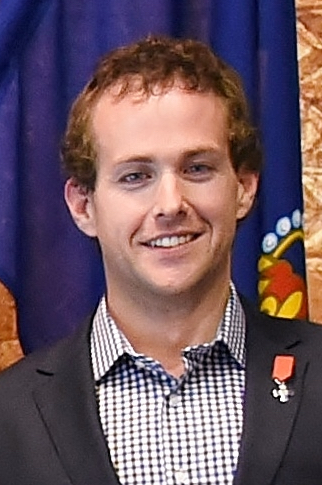
Adam Hall

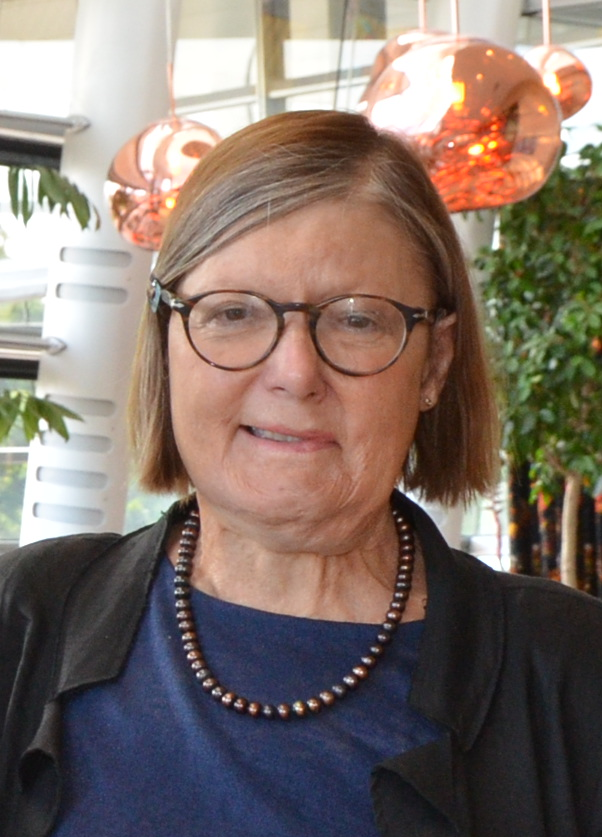
Jenny Harper

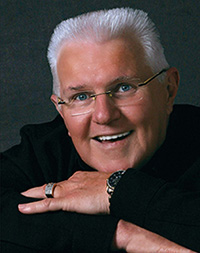
David Hartnell

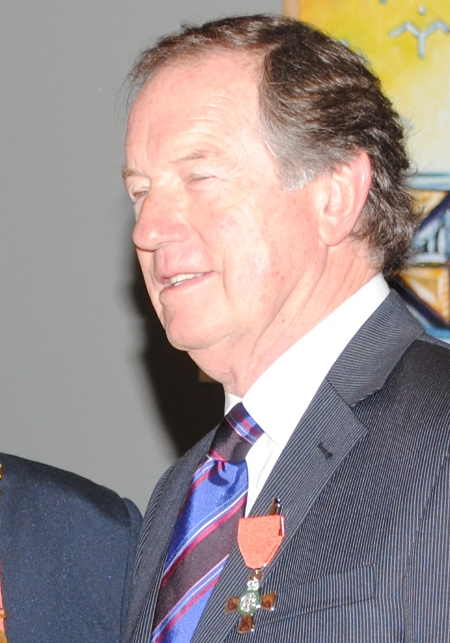
John Hawkesby

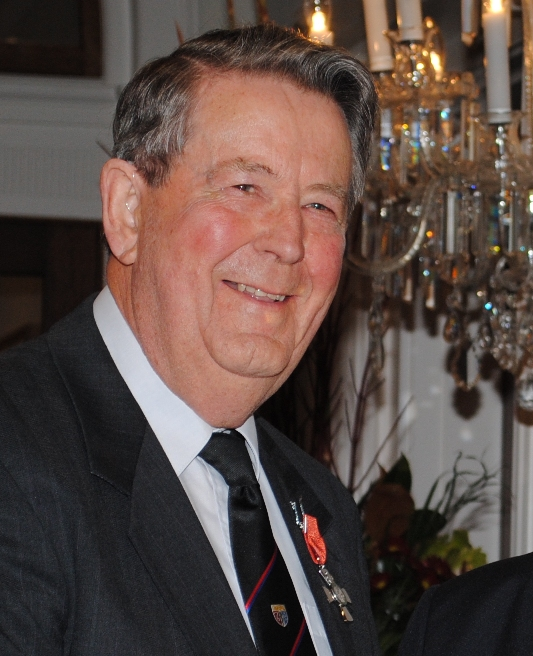
Rodger Hilliker

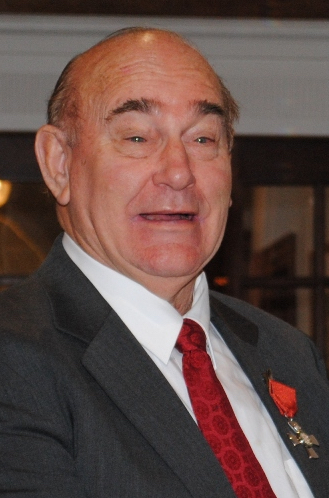
Guy Jansen

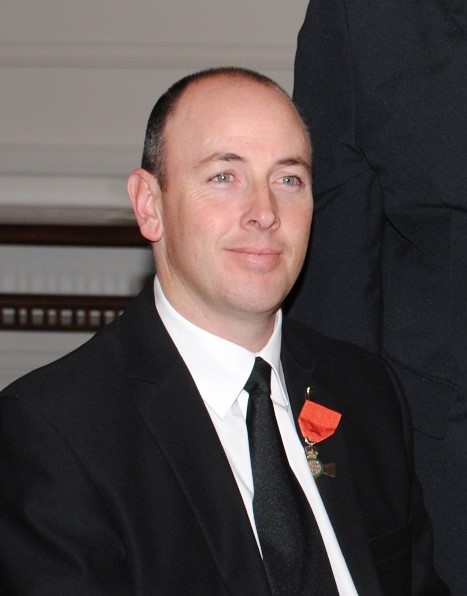
Michael Johnson

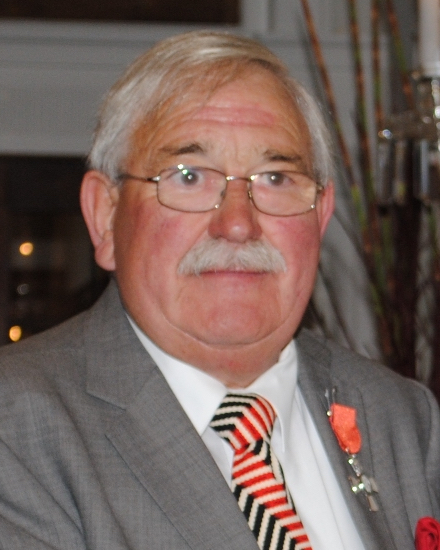
Lew McIvor

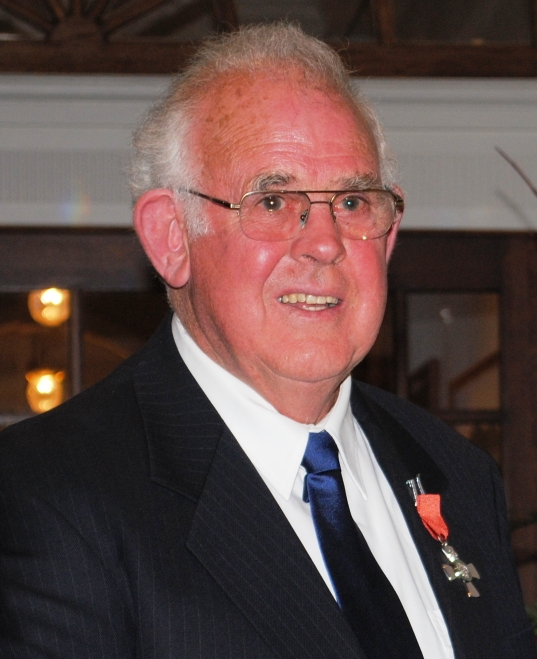
John Roadley

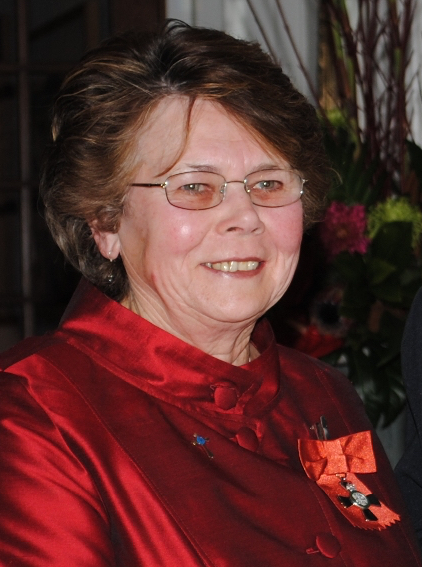
Sister Marie Roche

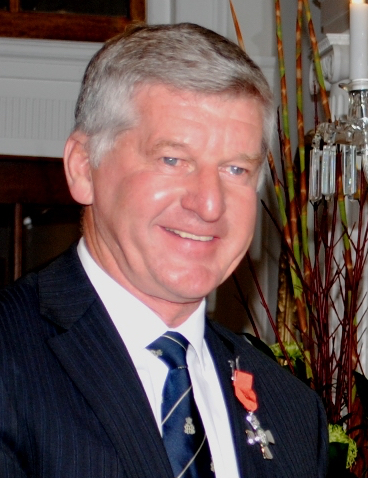
Ivan Sutherland

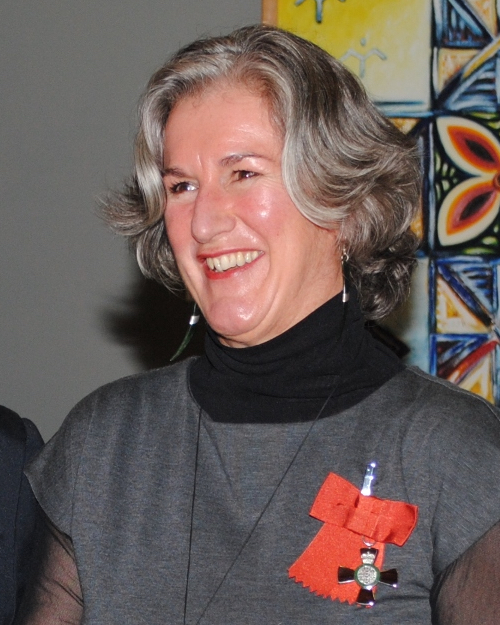
Jo-anne Wilkinson

== Companion of the Queen's Service Order (QSO) ==
- Dr Kelvin Raymond Berryman – of Plimmerton. For services to science.
- Dr Paul Garth Livingstone – of Wellington. For services to veterinary science.
- Carol Anne Moffatt MNZM – of Kaiapoi. For services to education.
- Judge Paul von Dadelszen – of Havelock North. For services to the Family Court.

== Queen's Service Medal (QSM) ==
- David Page Adamson – of Invercargill. For services to the New Zealand Fire Service.
- John Antony – of Auckland. For services to musical theatre.
- Irene Rosslyn Barnes – of Manapouri. For services to the community.
- William David Bevan – of Porirua. For services to the community.
- Audrey Maud Bevege – of Te Kūiti. For services to the community.
- Senior Sergeant Kevin Joseph Brennan – of Auckland. For services to the New Zealand Police.
- George Brown – of Invercargill. For services to the community.
- Dorothy Ellen Burley – of Upper Hutt. For services to the community.
- Grace Byers – of Te Aroha. For services to the community.
- Amanda Catherine Calder – of Wellington. For services to the community.
- Douglas John Joseph Clemens – of Rotorua. For services to the community.
- Janet Elizabeth Colby – of Auckland. For services to health.
- Henry William Cranefield – of Auckland. For services to the community.
- Glenis Margaret Crutchley – of Ranfurly. For services to the community.
- Yvonne June Dasler – of Blenheim. For services to the community.
- James Greer Dickson – of Christchurch. For services to the New Zealand Customs Service.
- Michael Terence Dwyer – of Wellington. For services to Māori and the community.
- Urikore Julie Anne Dwyer – of Wellington. For services to Māori and the community.
- Doreen Ngawai Erueti – of New Plymouth. For services to Māori.
- Gweneth Pauline Fairbrother – of Dannevirke. For services to the community.
- Peter Morton Franks – of Gisborne. For services to the community.
- Murray Stanley Gane – of Te Awamutu. For services to the New Zealand Fire Service.
- Richard William Glover – of Gisborne. For services to surf life saving and the community.
- Barry John Haddock – of Auckland. For services to education.
- Stephen Hugh Staples Hamilton – of Auckland. For services to the community.
- Ethne Elna Hanna – of Auckland. For services to the community.
- Ross Leslie Hanna JP – of Auckland. For services to the community.
- Vaiopuaa Faletoi Harris – of Auckland. For services to the community.
- Milton Mansfield McElroy Hollard – of Wellington. For services to the House of Representatives.
- Chief Fire Officer Raymond George Clarence Huxford – of Feilding. For services to the New Zealand Fire Service.
- Henare Ngaera Keefe JP – of Hastings. For services to Māori and the community.
- Emma Kesha – of Dunedin. For services to the Pacific community.
- Youn Soo Lee – of Christchurch. For services to the Korean community.
- Tom Kwok Hing Leong – of Auckland. For services to the electrical industry.
- Violet Naomi Lynch – of Gore. For services to netball.
- Barbara Dawn Mahutonga – of New Plymouth. For services to early childhood education.
- Anita Mansell – of Lower Hutt. For services to the Filipino community.
- Rupene Mare – of Kaitaia. For services to Māori and the community.
- Carol Eileen Marshall – of Tūrangi. For services to early childhood education.
- John Barry Massam – of Auckland. For services to the community.
- Heneriata Maxwell – of Lower Hutt. For services to Te Kōhanga Reo.
- Laurence Augustine McEntee – of Auckland. For services to the community.
- Roderick Tomas McKenzie – of Masterton. For services to local body affairs and the community.
- Timothy Michael Metcalfe – of Wanganui. For services to the community.
- Ian Alexander Munro JP – of Auckland. For services to the community.
- Wiremu Te Pania Nathan – of Kaitaia. For services to the community.
- Grant William Maurice Nelson – of Christchurch. For services to philanthropy.
- Marilyn Ann Nelson – of Christchurch. For services to philanthropy.
- Peter Laurence Oldham – of Waimamaku. For services to the community.
- Susan Jane Page – of Napier. For services to the community.
- Brian Joseph Palmer – of Tauranga. For services to search and rescue.
- Margaret Ethel Rex-Benner JP – of Tauranga. For services to the community.
- Jennifer Ann Roper – of Wairoa. For services to the community
- Harkrishen Singh JP – of Hamilton. For services to the Indian community.
- Manjit Singh – of Auckland. For services to the Indian community.
- Sergeant Richard George Spendelow – of Auckland. For services to the New Zealand Police.
- Mary Rose Sturgeon JP – of Runanga. For services to the community.
- Parakash Chandar Sund – of Auckland. For services to the community.
- Tahi Tākao JP – of Motueka. For services to Māori.
- Desmond Walter Templeton – of Riverton. For services to flax-milling heritage.
- Anita Po-Chu Thirtle, JP – of Wanganui. For services to the Chinese community.
- Henry George Raymond Tolley – of Masterton. For services to the community.
- Hana Espie Tukukino – of Benowa, Queensland, Australia. For services to Māori.
- Watene Waara Tukukino – of Benowa, Queensland, Australia. For services to Māori.
- Frank Stewart Vosper – of Tauranga. For services to the community.
- Te Waikaretu Wickliffe – of Kawerau. For services to Māori.
- Eruera Wiki Wikiriwhi – of Tokoroa. For services to Māori.
- Pamela Ann Wilson JP – of Mangakino. For services to the community.
- Wallace Andrew Wilson – of Christchurch. For services to surf life saving and rugby league.
- Mary Isabel Yearbury – of Auckland. For services to the community.
- Senior Station Officer Ivan John Young – of Napier. For services to the New Zealand Fire Service.
- Margaret Carole Young JP – of Ōpōtiki. For services to the community.
John Antony

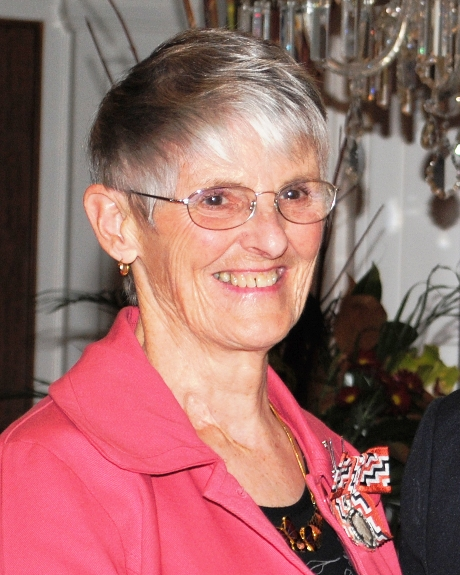
Irene Barnes

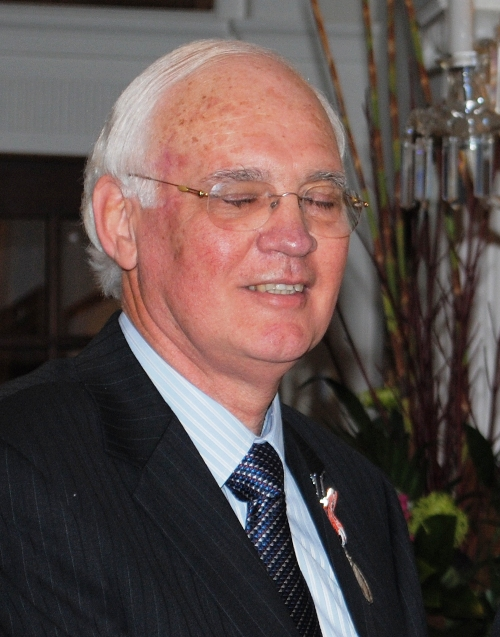
Douglas Clemens

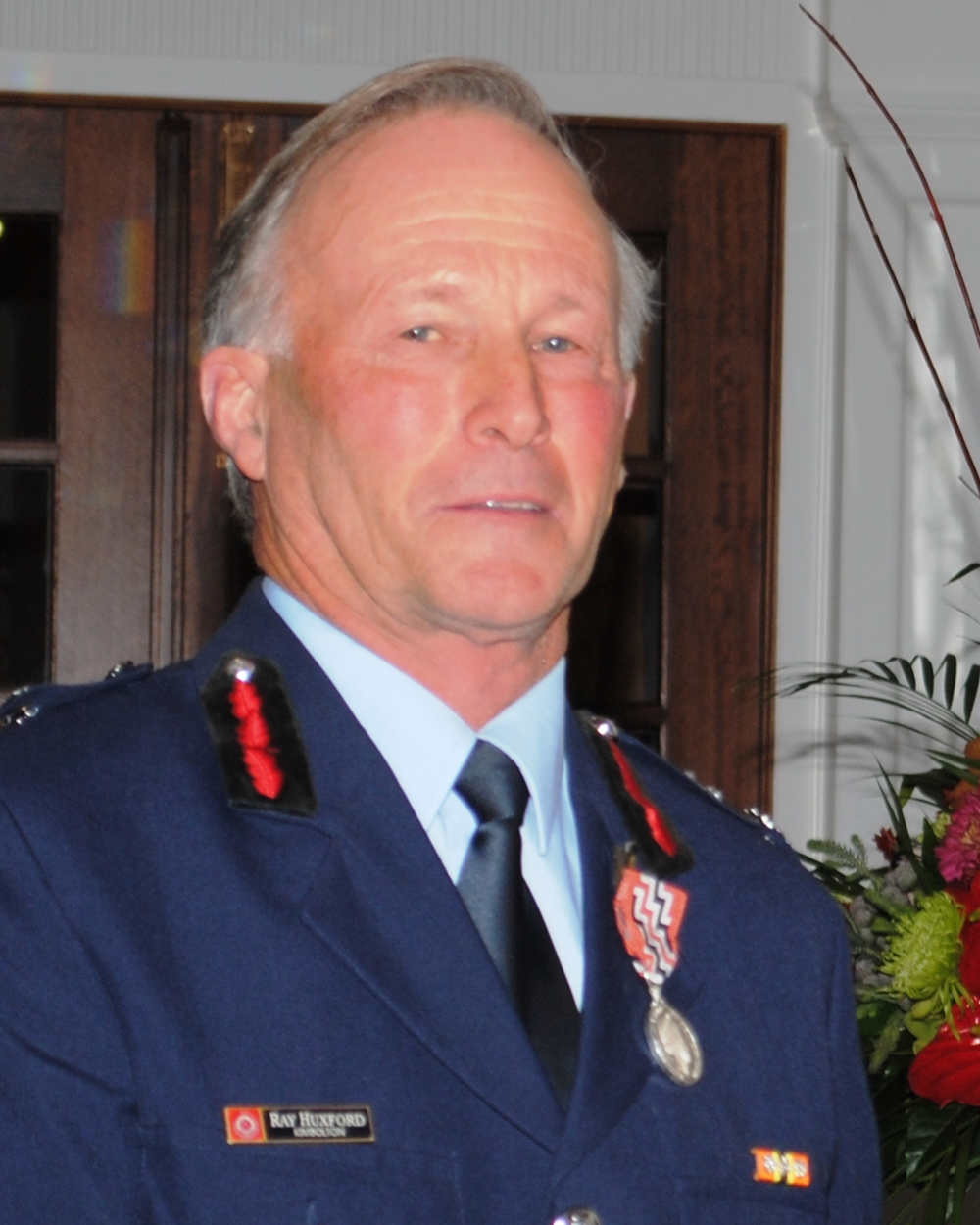
Ray Huxford

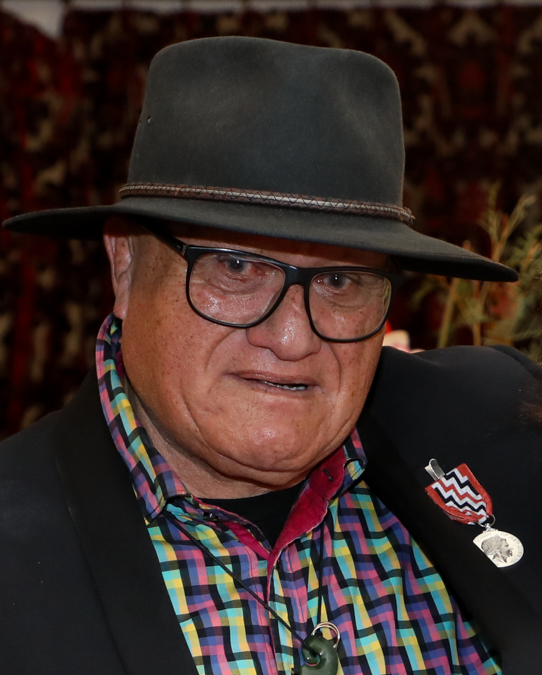
Henare O'Keefe

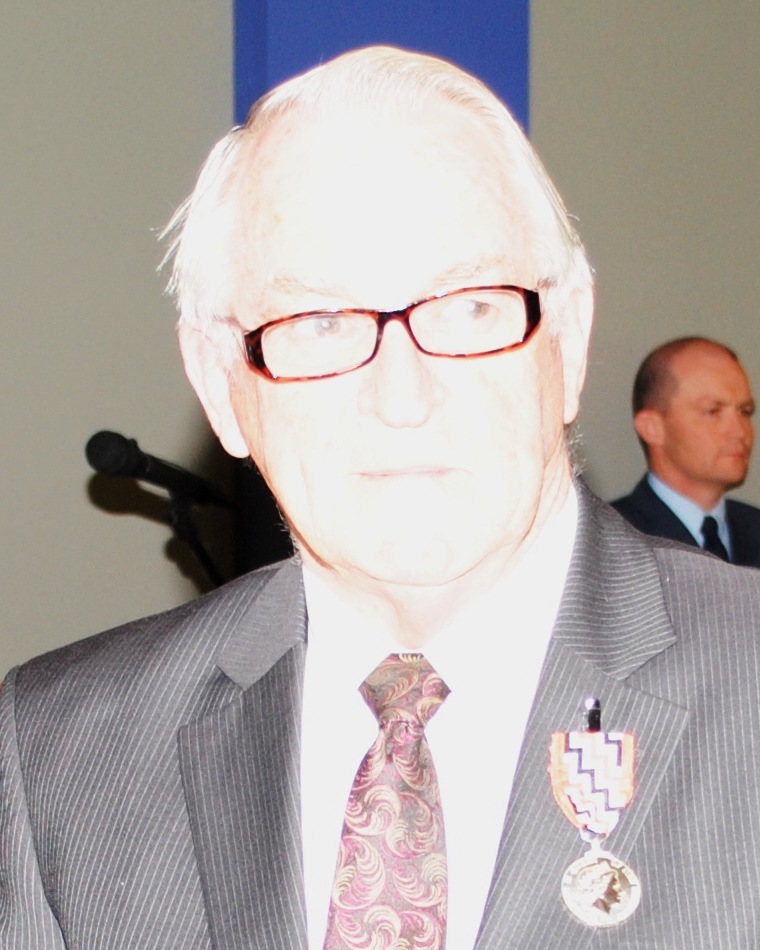
John Massam

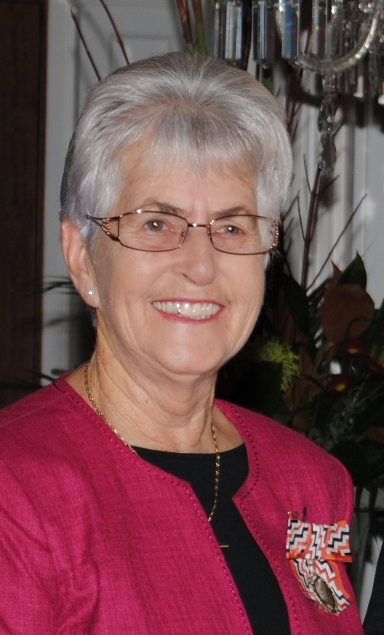
Mary Sturgeon

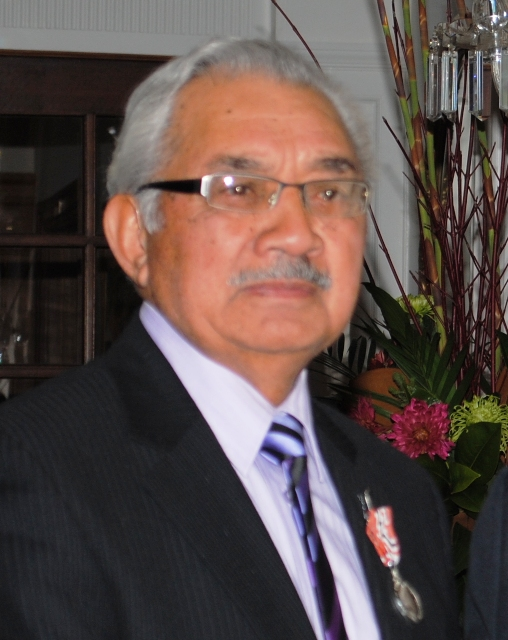
Tahi Tākao

== New Zealand Distinguished Service Decoration (DSD) ==
- Lieutenant Colonel Christopher John Parsons MNZM – New Zealand Special Air Service.
- Warrant Officer Class 1 Ian Richard Ponse – Royal New Zealand Army Logistic Regiment.
- Acting Warrant Officer Darren Smith – Royal New Zealand Air Force.
