= Jo-anne Wilkinson =

New Zealand youth worker

Jo-anne Wilkinson CNZM
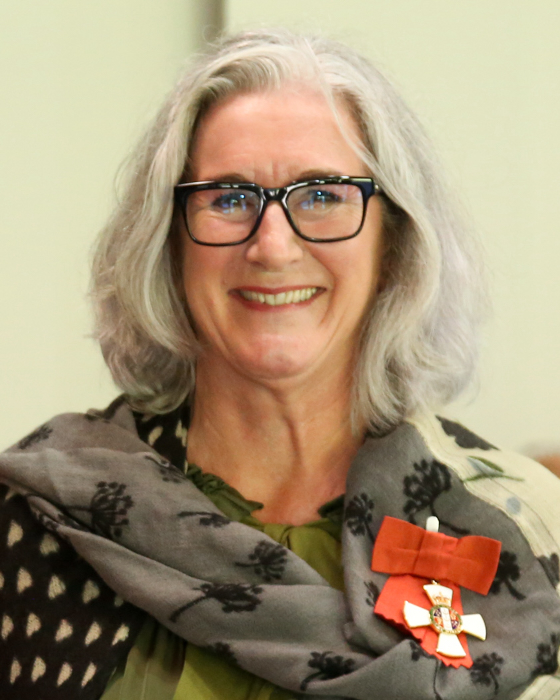
- Wilkinson in 2024
- Born: Jo-anne Edna Mary Wilkinson; 1957 or 1958 (age 67–68)
- Spouse: Graeme Dingle (m. 1999)

Jo-anne Edna Mary Wilkinson, Lady Dingle CNZM (born 1957 or 1958), is a New Zealand youth worker. She co-founded the Graeme Dingle Foundation with her then-partner and now husband Graeme Dingle in 1995.

== Biography ==
Wilkinson was born in about 1958. She graduated with a Bachelor of Laws degree from Victoria University of Wellington in 1991, and practised as a lawyer.

Wilkinson first met Graeme Dingle in 1984 and were friends for about five years, until becoming life partners in 1990 and marrying in 1999. In 1992–1993, when Dingle was attempting to circumnavigate the Arctic, Wilkinson joined him for the final 6,000 kilometres (3,700 mi). Not long after leaving the Alaskan coast to cross the Bering Sea, they had a leak in their boat.

Once Wilkinson and Dingle returned to New Zealand, they noticed that the country had high rates of youth suicide and incarceration and decided that they wanted to do something about it. In 1995, they established the Graeme Dingle Foundation, "to give young people purpose, a positive outlook and tools to self-determine". Wilkinson has been intimately involved in developing the organisation's programmes—including Project K and KiwiCan—in which over 300,000 young people have participated. She has also led the foundation's research programme to confirm that their activities met objectives and positively impacted the lives of the youth undertaking them. In 2013, Wilkinson stepped down from her role as the foundation's executive director. Since 2012 she has been chair of the programme committee, and since 2016, deputy chair of the foundation.

From 2015 to 2019, Wilkinson was a member of the Auckland War Memorial Museum Trust Board. From 2014 to 2018, she chaired and was interim families commissioner of Superu. Between 2017 and 2020, Wilkinson chaired the Ministry of Social Development's Grievance Panel, and was a member of the Oranga Tamariki Risk and Assurance Panel.

== Honours and awards ==
In the 2011 Queen's Birthday Honours, Wilkinson was appointed a Member of the New Zealand Order of Merit, for services to youth. She was promoted to Companion of the New Zealand Order of Merit in the 2024 New Year Honours, also for services to youth.

In the 2014 New Zealand Women of Influence Awards, Wilkinson was a joint winner of the social enterprise category.
