= Kāterina Mataira =

New Zealand Māori language advocate, artist and writer

Dame Kāterina Mataira DNZM
- Born: 13 November 1932; Tokomaru Bay, New Zealand
- Died: 16 July 2011 (aged 78); Hamilton, New Zealand
- Known for: Māori language proponent, educator, intellectual, artist, writer

Dame Kāterina Te Heikōkō Mataira DNZM (13 November 1932 – 16 July 2011) was a New Zealand Māori language proponent, educator, intellectual, artist and writer. Her efforts to revive and revitalise the Māori language (te reo Māori) led to the growth of Kura Kaupapa Māori in New Zealand.

== Biography ==
Mataira was born in 1932 in Tokomaru Bay, on the east coast of the North Island. She was a member of the Ngāti Porou iwi. Mataira had nine children with her husband, Junior Te Ratu Karepa Mataira. She initially studied to be an art teacher and educator. She trained at Dunedin Training College and Ardmore Teachers College and taught at Northland College where one of her students was Selwyn Muru, inspiring him to also attend Admore.

Mataira spent time on various Pacific Islands. She was in Fiji from 1973 to 1975 including working at the University of South Pacific. She got involved with teacher training and also the study of tapa cloth making. From there she went to Rarotonga as they were reviving tapa. She ran art programmes in Samoa, Nauru and Gilbert Islands.

Mataira and a friend, fellow teacher Ngoi Pēwhairangi, co-founded the Te Ataarangi programme as a way to teach and revitalise the Māori language. Mataira was intrigued by the Silent Way, a language teaching method created by Caleb Gattegno, and adapted the method to teach Māori. In 1980 she completed a master's thesis on the silent way, at the University of Waikato. Her efforts earned her the nickname of the "mother" of the Kura Kaupapa Māori, according to Dr Pita Sharples. She also authored Māori language children's picture books and novels.

She became a foundation member of the Māori Language Commission in 1987.

== Honours and awards ==
In 1979 Mataira was awarded a Choysa Bursary for Children's Writers. With this she completed four Māori legend picture books.

In 1996 the University of Waikato in 1996 gave her an Honorary Doctorate. In 1997, she was awarded the University of Otago College of Education/Creative New Zealand Children's Writer in Residence Fellowship.

In the 1998 Queen's Birthday Honours, Mataira was appointed a Companion of the New Zealand Order of Merit, for services to the Māori language. One month before her death, she was promoted to Dame Companion of the New Zealand Order of Merit, also for services to the Māori language, in the 2011 Queen's Birthday Honours.

In 2001 she received Te Tohu Tiketike / Exemplary Award from Creative New Zealand's Te Waka Toi awards.

In 2007, Mataira received the Betty Gilderdale Award.

In 2009 UNESCO awarded her the Linguapax Award which is ‘an international honour which recognises the preservation and promotion of mother languages as essential vehicles of identity and cultural expression.’

In 2017, Mataira was selected as one of the Royal Society Te Apārangi's "150 women in 150 words", celebrating the contributions of women to knowledge in New Zealand.

== Books ==
=== Written in Māori language (te reo Māori) ===
- Te Atea (1975)
- Makorea (2000). Ahuru Press. A three-volume historical novel.
- Makorea (2002)
- Rehua (2006)
- Picture books in Māori for children – Maui and the Big Fish, Marama Taniweto and Nga Mokonui a Rangi

== Death ==
Mataira died on 16 July 2011, in Hamilton, at the age of 78. She was survived by her nine children, 50 grandchildren, great-grandchildren and one great-great-grandchild. Her tangi, or Māori funeral, was at the Ohinewaiapu Marae in Rangitukia.
