= Jonathan White (painter) =

New Zealand landscape artist (1938–2021)

Jonathan White MNZM
- Born: 12 September 1938; Gisborne, New Zealand
- Died: 17 July 2021 (aged 82); Whakatāne, New Zealand
- Website: jonathanwhite.co.nz

Jonathan Robert White MNZM (12 September 1938 – 17 July 2021) was a New Zealand landscape artist. Largely self-taught, his work is recognised both in New Zealand and internationally, and is held in many public and private collections across the world. White painted professionally for over 50 years and held many solo and joint exhibitions; he died two weeks before his final exhibition was held in Invercargill.

== Biography ==
Born on 12 September 1938 at the Redwood private hospital in Gisborne, White resided in Whakatāne, in the North Island of New Zealand. He was educated at King's College, Auckland, in the 1950s, and in 1982 received an honours tie from the school for distinguishing himself in the field of art. In 1968 and 1970, he received merit prizes in the annual Kelliher Art Prize competition, and in 1971 placed second in the competition.

White was interested in botany, ornithology and tramping, and his paintings reflect his personal love of remote places, wilderness areas and New Zealand's landscape. He had an interest in conservation work and became an honorary ranger for Fiordland and Te Urewera National Parks. He was also a life member of the Royal Forest and Bird Protection Society of New Zealand, the World Wide Fund for Nature, and the QEII National Trust. In 1990, he was commissioned to create a collection of paintings for the national parks centennial. White's style could be classed as realism and representational of the scenes he was capturing.

During the summer season of 1989 to 1990, White visited Antarctica with the New Zealand Antarctic Research Programme, to execute a series of sketches and paintings of the historic buildings and the McMurdo Dry Valleys. He was invited by Antarctica New Zealand’s predecessor, the Antarctic Division of the Department of Scientific and Industrial Research, to paint artworks featuring the historic huts and promote the work being done to support heritage in Antarctica. White's intention was to help create a collective body of work that recorded the huts and environment for historical purposes. A number of paintings were produced following this trip, including a painting of Scott Base, and paintings of the scenery of Antarctica. Exhibitions of White's Antarctic work were consecutively held in Tauranga, Whakatāne, Christchurch, Wellington and Auckland, and helped raised funds for the Antarctic Heritage Trust.

White published three books including high-resolution images of his sketches and painting collections: New Zealand's Majestic Wilderness (1981), Jonathan White's New Zealand (1986) and Footsteps in the Wilderness (1989). The first two included text by historian John Hall-Jones. The latter was described by New Zealand writer Tim Jones as a "collection of extravagantly rich landscape paintings of remote parts of New Zealand". In 2010, White's paintings were featured at the launch of the Mountfort Art Gallery in Queenstown. In reporting on the exhibition, The Southland Times noted that White was "known for his highly detailed, large-scale landscapes, which often feature vistas of Fiordland and the Haast", and described him as "internationally renowned" but "publicity-shy". His works ranged in price from NZ$8,950 to NZ$60,000 at the event.

In the 2011 Queen's Birthday Honours, White was appointed a Member of the New Zealand Order of Merit, for services to the arts and community. He said to the Rotorua Daily Post at the time that "I don't seek publicity, however I am both flattered and honoured to be recognised."

White died at his home in Whakatāne on 17 July 2021, just two weeks before his final exhibition opened in Invercargill. Wayne Marriott, the city council manager of museum and heritage services, noted that White's death was a huge loss, and said, "We've lost two of the masters this year" (the other being Peter Beadle). His artist files are held at Auckland Art Gallery, the University of Auckland and Te Papa.
