= Margaret Horsburgh =

New Zealand academic

Margaret Horsburgh CNZM
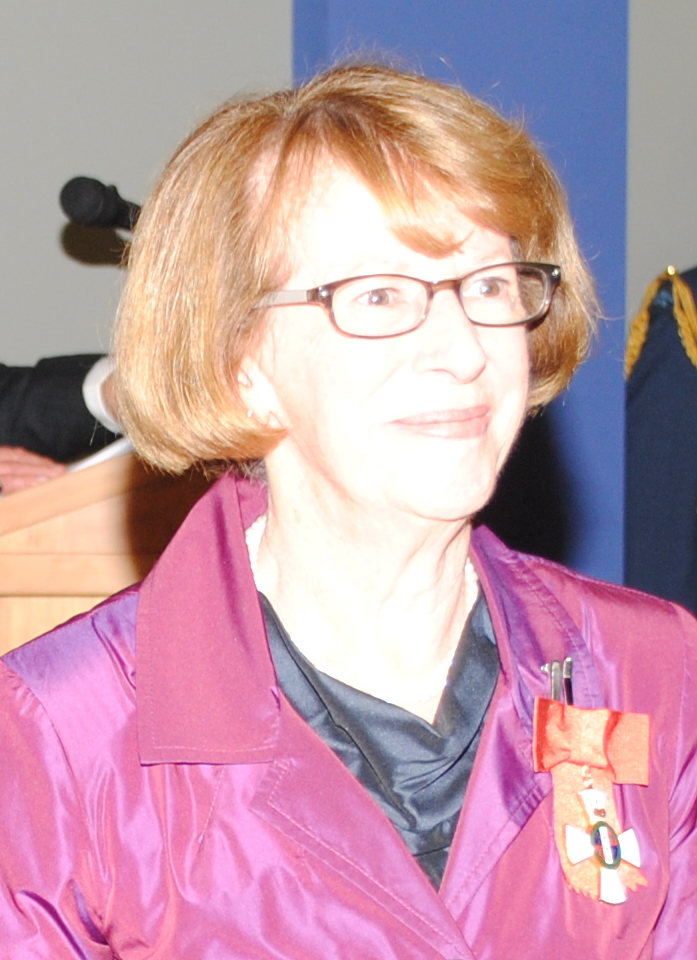
- Horsburgh in 2011
- Born: Margaret Phyllis Elsie Rickard; 1943 (age 82–83); Auckland, New Zealand

Academic background
- Education: Charles Sturt University
- Thesis: Quality monitoring in higher education: a case study of the impact on student learning (1998)

Academic work
- Discipline: Nursing education
- Institutions: Auckland Institute of Technology; University of Auckland

Margaret Phyllis Elsie Horsburgh CNZM (née Rickard; born 1943) is a New Zealand academic who established the school of nursing at the University of Auckland and worked as a nurse educator for over 30 years.

Horsburgh was born in Auckland in 1943, and was educated at Diocesan School for Girls. She began training as a nurse in 1961. From a career as an intensive-care nurse, Horsburgh joined Auckland University of Technology in 1976. She completed a Doctor of Education degree through Charles Sturt University in 1998, with a thesis titled Quality monitoring in higher education: a case study of the impact on student learning. In 1999, she moved to the University of Auckland as director of nursing, then associate dean of education (2002–2004) and finally associate professor (2004–2009). As of 2022, she remains an honorary associate professor.

Horsburgh joined the board of the Auckland War Memorial Museum Trust in 2004. She was the first chair of the New Zealand Nurse Practitioners Advisory Committee when appointed in 2001 and served on the Auckland District Health Board from 2000 to 2004. She was one of the elected members in the inaugural 2001 elections, having stood in the Northeast ward, and was then appointed by the Minister of Health as deputy chair to Wayne Brown (one of the appointed members).

In 2015, Horsburgh was appointed the Auckland regional field adviser by the New Zealand Walking Access Commission.

Horsburgh was appointed a Companion of the New Zealand Order of Merit in the 2011 Birthday Honours, for service to health.
