= John Clarke (public servant) =

New Zealand public servant

Sir John Clarke KNZM
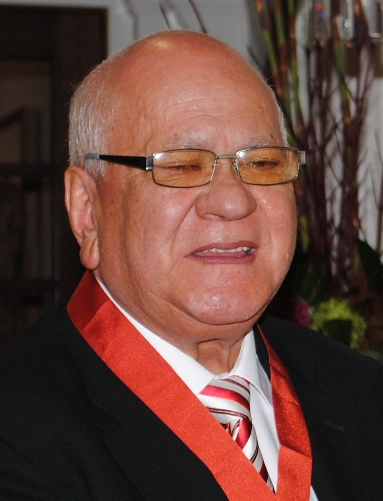
- Clarke in 2011

Personal details
- Born: Herbert John Te Kauru Clarke; 16 April 1942 (age 83) Te Araroa, New Zealand
- Occupation: Public servant

Sir Herbert John Te Kauru Clarke KNZM (born 16 April 1942) is a New Zealand public servant.

Clarke was born on 16 April 1942 in Te Araroa. In 1969, he married Kathleen Lyndall Upton; they were to have two sons and one daughter. He was Race Relations Conciliator from 1992 to 1995; the title changed during his tenure to Race Relations Commissioner.

In 1990, Clarke was awarded the New Zealand 1990 Commemoration Medal. In the 2011 Queen's Birthday Honours, he was appointed a Companion of the New Zealand Order of Merit, for services to Māori, and in the 2018 New Year Honours he was elevated to Knight Companion of the New Zealand Order of Merit, for services to Māori and heritage preservation.
