= Kura kaupapa Māori =

Māori-language immersion schools

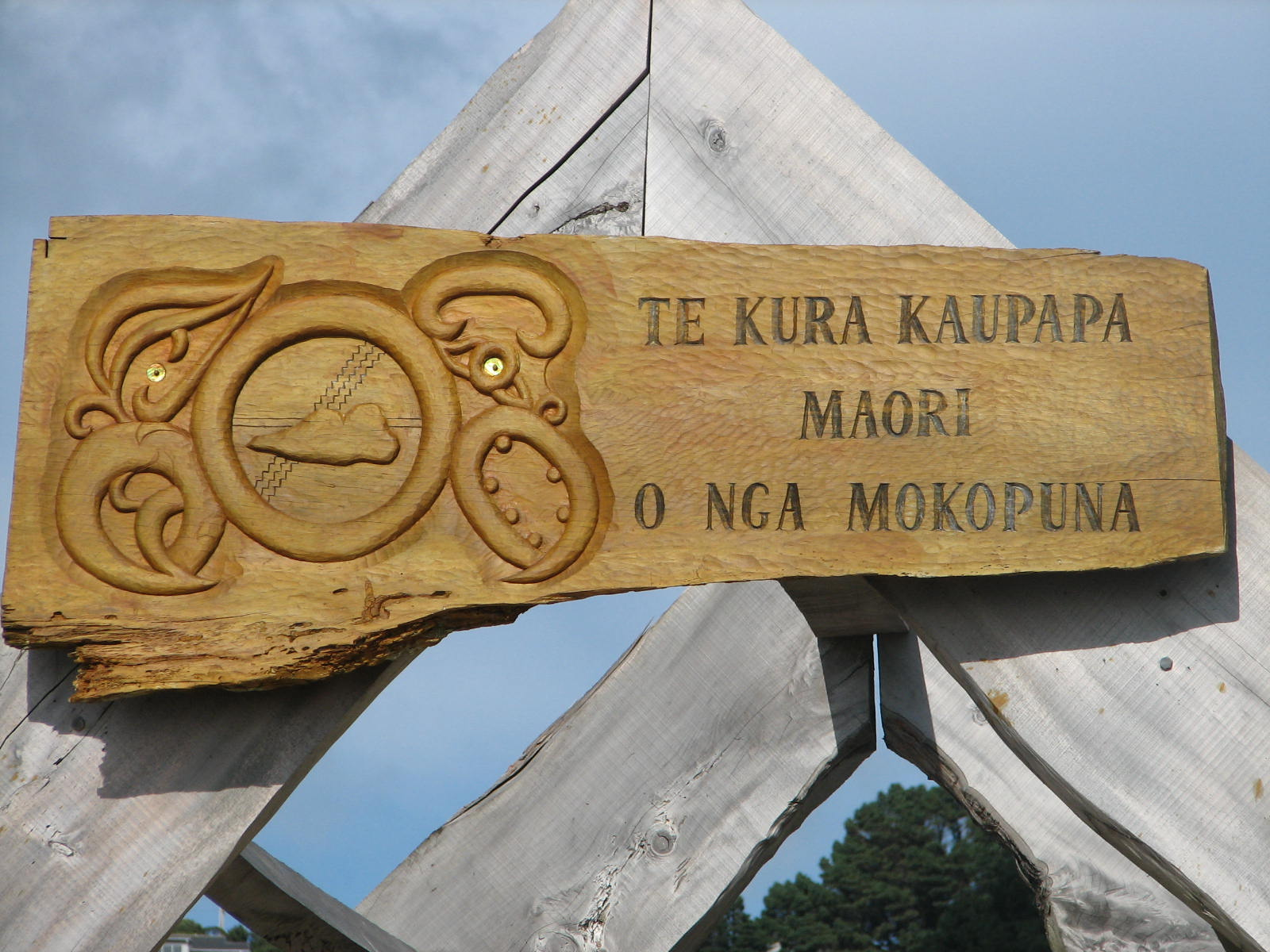
Te Kura Kaupapa Māori o Nga Mokopuna

Kura kaupapa Māori are Māori-language immersion schools (kura) in New Zealand, where the philosophy and practice reflect Māori cultural values with the aim of revitalising Māori language, knowledge and culture. Kura kaupapa Māori are established under the Education Act (1989). The term kaupapa Māori is used by Māori to mean any particular plan of action created by Māori to express Māori aspirations, values and principles.

== History ==
The establishment of kura kaupapa Māori schools followed a 1971 report by researcher Richard Benton that the Māori language was in a critical near-death stage. By the 1980s, Māori communities "were so concerned with the loss of Māori language, knowledge and culture that they took matters into their own hands and set up their own learning institutions at pre-school, elementary school, secondary school and tertiary levels".

The establishment of kōhanga reo (Māori-language pre-schools) triggered a series of initiatives in schooling and education by Māori, initially outside of the mainstream education system. The need for Māori language primary schools arose when parents were concerned that their children who had finished kōhanga reo quickly lost their language once they started at mainstream primary schools. Those kura kaupapa Māori are part of a series of Māori-led initiatives aimed at strengthening the language, affirming cultural identity, and encouraging community involvement.

Te Kura Kaupapa Māori o Hoani Waititi, Henderson, West Auckland, is generally credited as being the first kura kaupapa Māori and was established in 1985. The Kura Kaupapa Māori movement is a term commonly used to describe parents and supporters of kura kaupapa Māori. The term emerged when the first school was established.

In 1987, a working party was established to investigate an alternative schooling model that would better meet the aspirations of Māori communities in New Zealand. The working party consisted of Katerina Mataira, Pita Sharples, Graham Smith, Linda Smith, Cathy Dewes, Tuki Nepe, Rahera Shortland, Pem Bird and Toni Waho. The working party adopted Te Aho Matua as being the foundation set of principles that guide the operations of a kura kaupapa Māori.

Kura kaupapa Māori originate from humble beginnings. The government began funding kura kaupapa Māori five years after the first school was established. In the early years, from 1985 to 1995, almost all kura kaupapa Māori were accommodated at some stage in a place or venue that accommodate children for little or no rent. Parents raised funds to resource kura kaupapa Māori until the government officially recognised and funded the school.

== Legislation ==
In 1987, one of the recommendations of the Tomorrow's Schools' Pilot Report, a major education reform affecting all New Zealand schools, recommended to the government that Māori communities be able to establish and govern their own schools. The 1989 Education Act was amended to include Section 155 which provides for the Minister of Education to designate a state school as a kura kaupapa Māori by notice in the New Zealand Gazette. Although the Act was amended, many school communities were dissatisfied because the amendment did not adequately define the unique character of a kura kaupapa Māori.

On 16 July 1999, the Education (Te Aho Matua) Amendment Act 1999, amended Section 155 of the Education Act 1989. Māori communities wanted the unique character of kura kaupapa Māori to be protected in law. At the request of Te Runanga Nui, the Minister of Māori Affairs and associate Minister of Education Tau Henare was the Minister responsible for the Education (Te Aho Matua) Amendment Act becoming a statute in New Zealand. The Te Aho Matua amendment made it a requirement that kura kaupapa Māori adhere to the principles of Te Aho Matua. The amendment recognised Te Runanga Nui o nga Kura Kaupapa Māori as the kaitiaki (guardians, caretakers and architects), the most suitable body responsible for determining the content of Te Aho Matua, and for ensuring that it is not changed to the detriment of Māori.

According to Graham Smith, the charter "provides the guidelines for excellence in Māori, that is, what a good Māori education should entail. It also acknowledges Pākehā culture and skills required by Māori children to participate fully and at every level in modern New Zealand society" (G Smith 2003:10).

== Te Aho Matua – governing principles ==
Written in the Māori language, Te Aho Matua o nga Kura Kaupapa Māori are the principles kura kaupapa Māori are required to adhere to. The principles are underpinned by Māori values, beliefs and customs. On Thursday 21 January 2008, Te Aho Matua along with an explanation in English was published in the New Zealand Gazette by Parekura Horomia. When Te Aho Matua was introduced into Parliament to become legislated, an English explanation was written by Katerina Mataira.

Te Aho Matua has six sections:

1. Te Ira Tangata (the human essence), affirms the nature of the child as a human being with spiritual, physical and emotional requirements.
2. Te Reo (language), deals with language policy and how the schools can 'best advance the language learning of their children'.
3. Ngā Iwi (people), focuses on 'the social agencies which influence the development of children, in short, all those people with whom they interact as they make sense of their world and find their rightful place within it'.
4. Te Ao (the world), deals with 'the world which surrounds children and about which there are fundamental truths which affect their lives'.
5. Ahuatanga Ako (circumstances of learning), 'provides for every aspect of good learning which the whānau feel is important for their children, as well as the requirements of the national curriculum'.
6. Ngā Tino Uaratanga (essential values), 'focuses on what the outcome might be for children who graduate from Kura Kaupapa Māori' and 'defines the characteristics which Kura Kaupapa Māori aim to develop in their children'.

== Te Runanga Nui (national body) ==
In 1993, Uru Gardiner, the principal of Te Kura Kaupapa Māori o Te Ati Hau Nui A Paparangi, asked key architects of kura kaupapa Māori to visit Wanganui. Her kura whānau (parents and extended family of the school community) wanted to seek advice on good practice for establishing a kura kaupapa Māori. When Māori communities from around New Zealand learned of this hui (gathering) they asked if they could attend. Consequently, Te Runanga Nui o Nga Kura Kaupapa Māori o Aotearoa, commonly known as Te Runanga Nui, was established in 1993 at Kawhaiki marae on the Whanganui river. At the hui Pita Sharples became the inaugural Tumuaki (president) of Te Runanga Nui.

Te Runanga Nui is the national collective body of kura kaupapa Māori Te Aho Matua communities. An incorporated society, the organisation holds its annual meeting in different locations throughout New Zealand, usually on the last weekend of March. Meetings are mostly conducted in Māori. The purpose of the organisation is to support kura kaupapa Māori whānau (communities) in realising their aspirations for their schools. They engage in discussions and negotiations with the government, Ministry of Education, the Education Review Office and other organisations who have a vested interest in kura kaupapa Māori.

The organisation is divided into ten geographic regions, and kura kaupapa Māori belong to a particular region. At the annual meeting, each region elects a māngai (representative) who becomes a member of the Te Rūnanga Whāiti (executive committee). Two regions like Tāmaki Makaurau (Auckland) and Te Ūpoko o te Ika (Lower North island) have two māngai. Te Rūnanga Whāiti meets several times of the year, usually in Auckland to discuss issues affecting kura kaupapa Māori. The issues can vary. The organisation also elects a Tumuaki (president) at the meeting, the current being Hone Mutu. The organisation has a small secretariat and the current kaitakawaenga (co-ordinator) is Arapine Walker supported by Te Tari Tautoko (support team).

The nine geographic regions of Te Runanga Nui are Te Hiku (Northland), Tāmaki-makau-rau (Auckland), Tainui (Waikato), Mataatua (Bay of Plenty), Te Puku (Central North Island), Tai-rāwhiti (East Coast), Taranaki, Te Ati Hau Nui A Paparangi (South Taranaki), Te Upoko o te Ika (Wellington), and Te Waka (South Island).

Former tumuaki (presidents or chairpersons) of the Runanga Nui were Pita Sharples, Bert McLean, Cathy Dewes, Arni Wainui, Hohepa Campbell Hone Mutu and Rawiri Wright. The current Tumuaki Takirua are Cathy Dewes and Rawiri Wright (2023).

== Types of kura Māori ==
Different types of kura Māori have emerged because of resourcing arrangements used by the Ministry of Education to fund and staff kura. All kura Māori are co-educational and are part of the compulsory schooling sector of New Zealand state schools. Early childhood centres, kōhanga reo and universities, technical institutes or whare wananga in New Zealand are not part of the compulsory schooling sector.

=== Kura tuatahi (primary schools) ===
There are two types of primary schools in New Zealand. They are full primary and contributing primary. Full primary schools teach children from Years 0 to 8 and contributing primary schools teach from Years 0 to 6. Only children who turn 5 years old are eligible to be enrolled in these schools and the age of children ranges from 5 years old to 13 years old. Most of the children who enroll in kura tuatahi (primary school) enrol at a kura after turning 5 and graduating from a kōhanga reo (a Māori language learning nest child centre).

=== Kura arongatahi (composite schools) ===
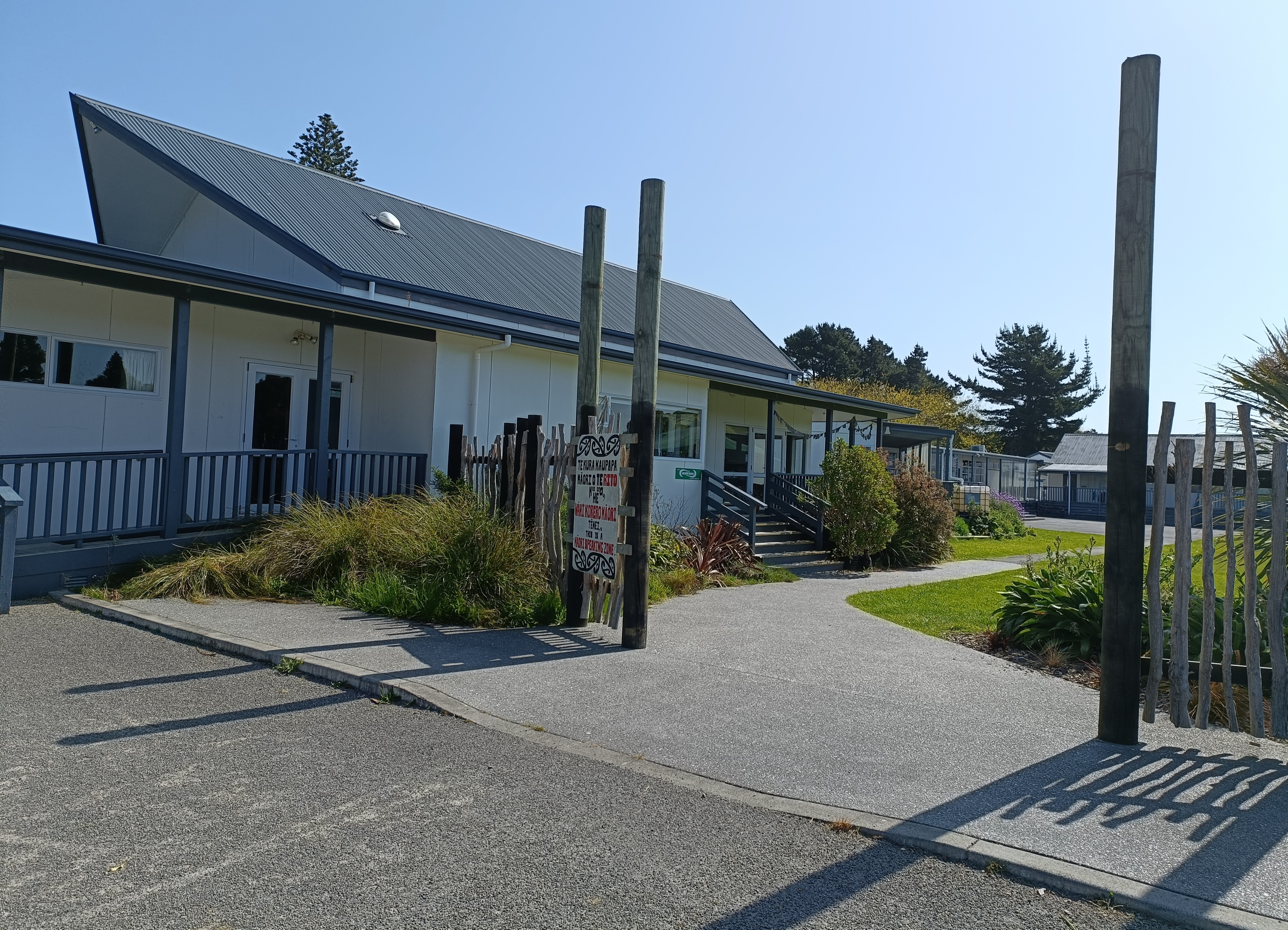
Te Kura Kaupapa Māori o Te Rito, Ōtaki, a composite school

Almost all kura arongatahi started as a full primary school. Kura arongatahi teach from Years 1 to Years 13. The age of children ranges from 5 years old to 18 years old, although in New Zealand education is only compulsory until 16. Students enrolled from Year 11 to Year 13 undertake NCEA (National Certificate of Educational Achievement). However, before a composite school can award NCEA qualifications, the school must be an accredited provider with the New Zealand Qualifications Authority. A school can only become composite once the Minister of Education has approved its change of class application. Approval to become a kura arongatahi typically takes two years. Funding and staffing of these schools is different from those of kura tuatahi. In 2008 there were 15 Kura Kaupapa Māori Te Aho Matua composite schools. A composite school in New Zealand can also be classified as an Area school. In recognition of becoming an area school or composite school, Te Kura Kaupapa Māori o Māngere, in Māngere, Auckland, changed its name to Te Kura Kaupapa Māori ā rohe o Māngere. Sometimes the Minister of Education will not approve a change of class application to become a full composite school, instead the minister will approve the application so that the school can become a restricted composite school. A restricted composite school usually allows a school to teach children from Years 1 to 10. Gaining restricted composite status does not limit a school from eventually gaining full composite status in the future, whereby the school is able to teach up to Year 15.

=== Wharekura (secondary schools) ===
A wharekura is an immersion secondary school where the philosophy and practice reflect Māori cultural values with the aim of revitalising Māori language, knowledge and culture. The term kaupapa Māori is used popularly by Māori to mean any particular plan of action created by Māori to express Māori aspirations, values and principles to teach children from Years 9 to Years 15. All of these schools are composite. In recognition of gaining wharekura status, one school, Te Kura Kaupapa Māori o Arowhenua, in Invercargill, changed its name to Te Wharekura o Arowhenua.

=== Kura tuakana (mentoring schools) ===
Some primary and composite kura kaupapa Māori become a kura tuakana (mentoring school). Prior to a formal establishment process being adopted by the government, kura kaupapa Māori would satellite a kura teina (mentored school) – another non-government-funded kura kaupapa Māori school community. This arrangement did not require Ministry of Education approval and was the mechanism used by the kura kaupapa Māori movement to increase the number of these schools around New Zealand. The satellite arrangement allowed the kura tuakana to give funding and staffing to the kura teina.

In 2001, the Ministry of Education negotiated a formal process for establishing new schools with Te Runanga Nui. The process now requires an applicant kura whanau to apply. Once the Minister of Education is satisfied with the application, a kura tuakana is assigned to support and mentor the applicant. Only selected kura kaupapa Māori can become a kura tuakana and must be able to demonstrate their ability to mentor the kura teina.

=== Kura teina (mentored schools) ===
Kura teina are applicant kura kaupapa Māori school communities who have applied to the Ministry of Education to become a standalone primary school. The kura teina operates and teaches children, either at the primary school year levels (Years 1 to 8) or at the wharekura school year levels (Years 9 to 15) or sometimes at primary and wharekura school year levels. Te Wharekura o Manurewa, Auckland, is the only kura kaupapa Māori that did not establish as a primary school. The school is a satellite to Te Kura Kaupapa Māori a Rohe o Māngere, located in Māngere, Auckland.

== School organisation ==
=== Governance arrangements ===
Each kura kaupapa Māori established in accordance with the Education Act has a governing body. Schools have a Board of Trustees where five parent representatives are elected, and it is defined in its constitution when school is gazetted in the New Zealand gazette. The principal and an elected staff representative automatically becomes a member of that Board. For many schools, all parents become the governing body. Graha Smiths said: "a key principle of kaupapa Māori, is the involvement of whanau (family)." This type of governance arrangement requires all parents to become actively involved at all levels of school operations. Schools that operate a whanau governance arrangement do not support the Board of Trustees model.

Like other state schools, the governing body is required to develop and adopt a school charter, strategic plan and annual plan. Policies also are developed to support the whanau and management to run the day-to-day affairs of the school.

=== Staffing and funding ===
The principal and all staff are employees of the governing body. The number of teachers is dependent on the number of children enrolled. There are two roll calculation dates for all New Zealand schools, used to calculate staffing numbers and teachers. The dates are known as the 1 March and 1 July roll return.

=== Times and days open ===
Kura kaupapa Māori are required to follow the stipulated number of days the school is required to be open in accordance with Ministry of Education guidelines. Primary schools are open for instruction from 9 am to 3 pm. The schools have the authority to change the times. Composite schools are required to be open for a longer period during the day because they are open fewer days of the year than primary schools. Opening times and dates vary from school to school.

=== Māori language funding ===
Kura kaupapa Māori receive additional funding to help them develop and maintain their Māori language immersion environment. An immersion leveling system is the mechanism used to calculate the funding. Kura kaupapa Māori are at level 1. This means that the language of instruction, the principal language used the teachers, Māori language in the classroom must be from 81% to 100%. It is common for teachers to not speak any English to their children at school. An additional salary allowance (MITA - Māori Immersion Teacher allowance) is also paid to full-time teachers who teach at Level 1.

=== English ===
Some kura tuatahi teach English and all kura arongatahi teach English to Year 9–13 students. Otherwise, English is only spoken in designated areas at kura.

=== Classroom organisation ===
Because of small roll numbers, most schools organise classrooms for a range of year levels. Year 1 and Year 2 students, are grouped separately, from Year 2 to Year 5 students, while Year 6 to Year 8 students separately. Schools have flexibility to organise their classrooms levels according to their priorities. Most schools operate a single cell classroom set up in which children are taught in one classroom by a single teacher. Three schools have an open plan teaching arrangement where children of many year levels are taught by many teachers in a large open teaching space. These schools are Mana Tamariki, Ruamata, and Te Kotuku.

=== Karakia (prayer) ===
Karakia is central to kura kaupapa Māori and the spiritual well-being of Māori. Meetings will begin with a prayer. Children at the start and end of the day will undertake karakia with their kaiako. On special occasions, when new schools are opened or at special school events, kaumatua (elders) of the community will undertake special karakia. Children are taught to honour and practise karakia. Two common forms of prayer are practised in schools, Christian based and kaupapa Māori based.

=== Curriculum ===
Te Aho Matua requires that the curriculum of a kura kaupapa Māori be holistic. A school strategic plan will determine the strategic direction the whanau (parents, principal, teachers) have for the learning of their children. Learning programmes are themed, incorporate Māori cultural perspectives, honour Māori customs and traditions and validate Māori knowledge. The curriculum is outcome focussed. Student achievement targets are defined to support the planning of learning programmes and assessment practise.
