= Marie Roche =

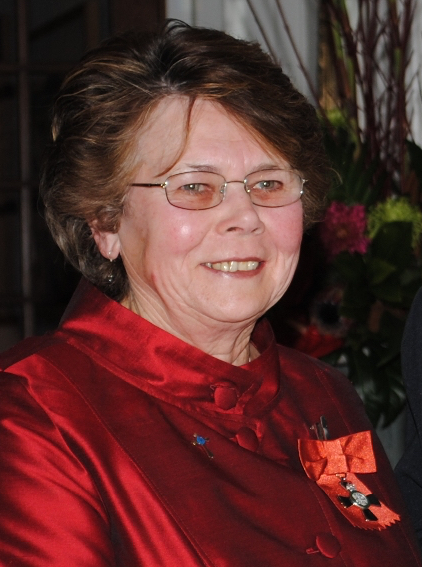
Roche in 2011

Sister Marie Elizabeth Roche MNZM is a New Zealand nun who was appointed a Member of the New Zealand Order of Merit in the 2011 Queen's Birthday Honours for services to the community, including for her work over 15 years as Rimutaka Prison's Catholic chaplain.
