= Alphonse Chodron de Courcel =

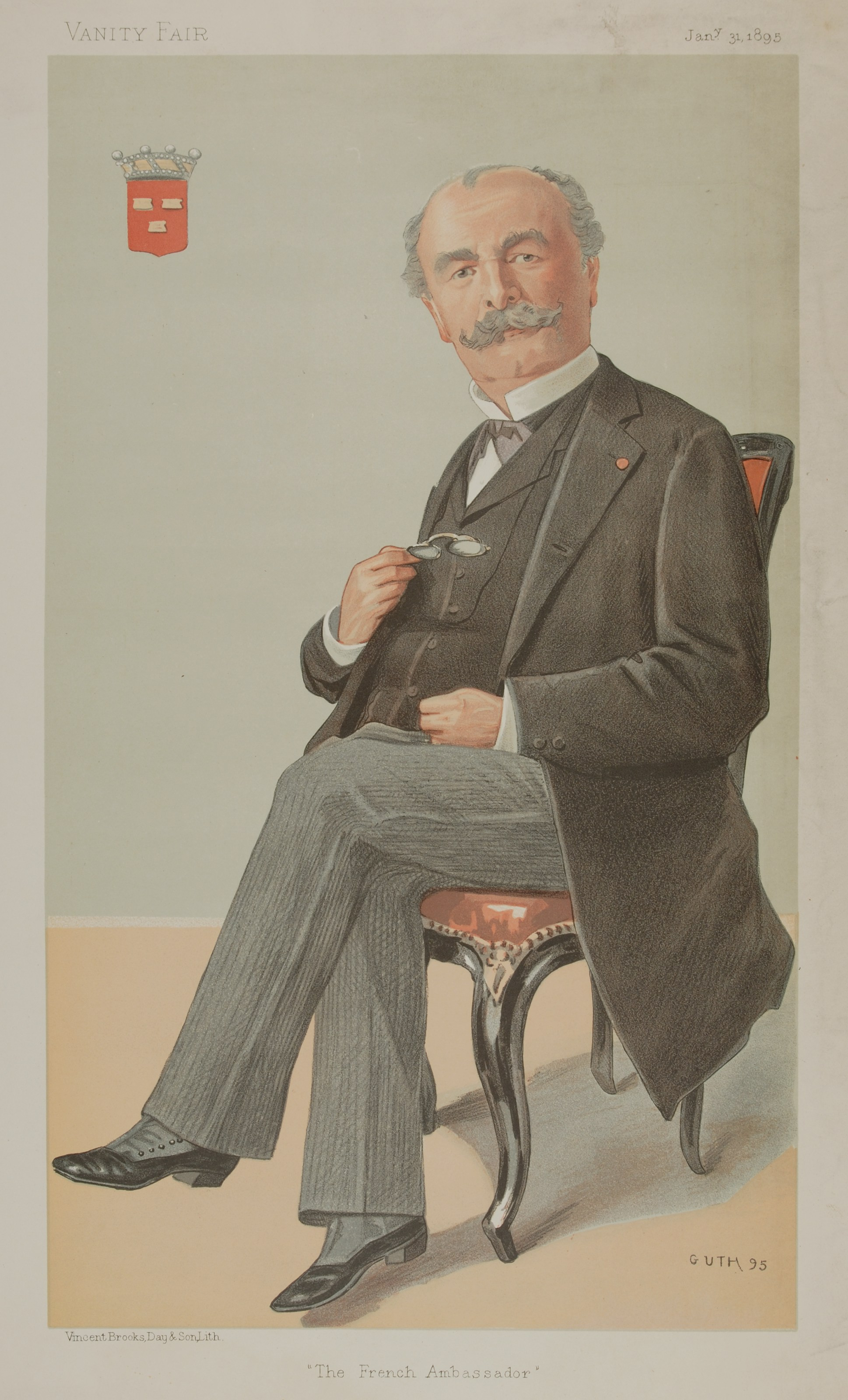

Baron Alphonse Chodron de Courcel (30 July 1835 – 17 June 1919) was a French diplomat and politician. He was French ambassador to Germany from 1881 to 1886, French ambassador to the United Kingdom from 1894 to 1898, and Senator of Seine-et-Oise from 1892 to 1919.

He represented France at the Berlin Conference of 1884–1885.

He presided over the I Olympic Congress in Paris in 1894, where it was decided to re-establish the Olympic Games.

His grandson, Baron Geoffroy Chodron de Courcel, was French ambassador to the United Kingdom from 1962 to 1972.
