= Roderick Fry =

New Zealand-born designer, retailer, writer

Roderick (Rod) Howard Fry
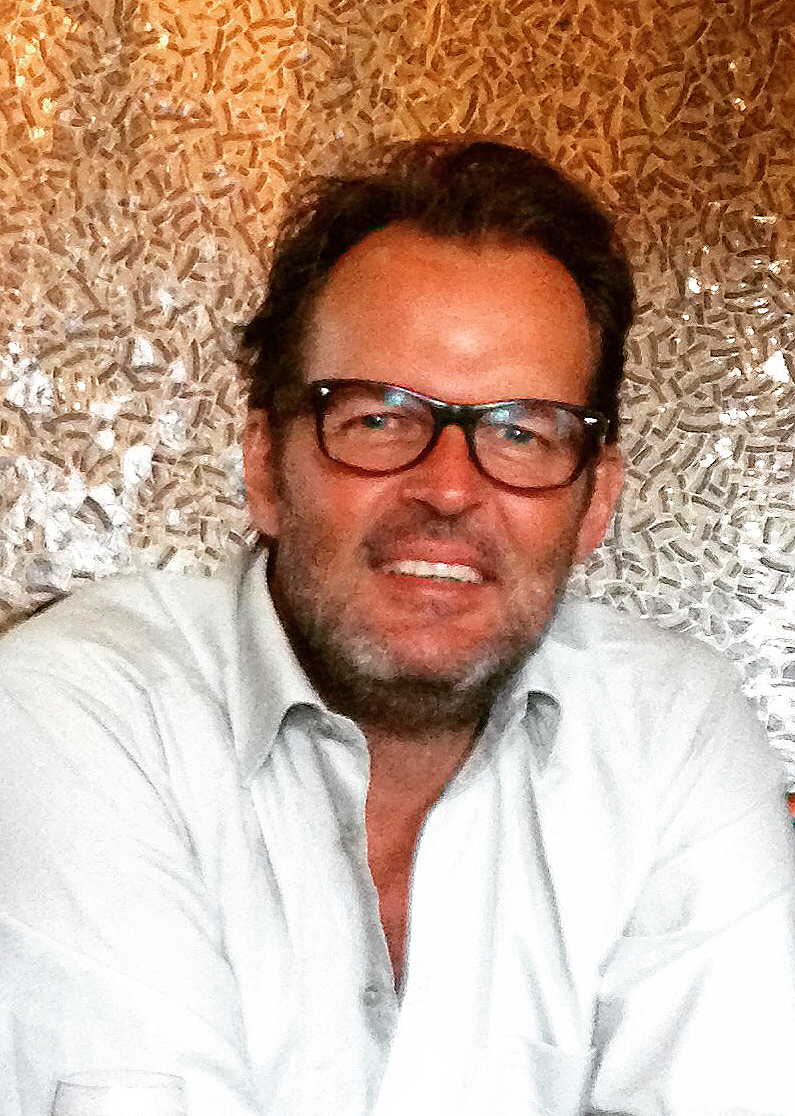
- Fry in Auckland in 2015.
- Born: 24 May 1969; Auckland, New Zealand
- Education: Saint Kentigern College; University of Auckland
- Occupations: Designer, retailer, writer
- Spouse: Laurence Varga-Fry (m. 2001)
- Children: 1
- Website: https://www.moaroom.com

Roderick Fry (born 1969) is a New Zealand-born, Paris-based designer, writer and promoter of sustainable and New Zealand design. He is the co-founder of Moaroom in Paris, co-publisher of The Long White Book, designer of the Pi furniture collection and author of the novel A Message for Nasty.

== Early life ==
Fry was born in Auckland, New Zealand, in 1969, and was raised and went to school in the Auckland suburb of Pakuranga. He gained a Bachelor of Commerce marketing and management degree from the University of Auckland. After living in USA and Canada, Fry learned to speak Mandarin and worked as a product manager for Swiss company, Roche, in Hong Kong, then Taiwan. There he met Laurence Varga, and they moved to Shanghai. There he worked for French design and communication firm Joel Desgrippes and Associates before taking a sabbatical to write his first novel, which is being published in 2022. In 2001, Fry and Varga moved to Paris where they were married. Fry learned to speak French and continued to write.

== Work ==
In 2004, Fry and Varga co-founded moa – meubles et objets de Aotearoa, now Moaroom, a Paris showroom and website to promote New Zealand designers who were achieving international attention, but at the time, struggling to maintain a long-term presence in the European press, or to develop ongoing relationships with design museums, distributors and architects.

To help European journalists and clients to contextualise and better understand New Zealand design, Fry and Varga published a selection of New Zealand designers, architects, fashion brands and artists, including David Trubridge, Toi Māori Aotearoa, Jakob + MacFarlane and Liz Findlay's Zambesi, in The Long White Book, which showcased their work. The book resulted in strong visibility for New Zealand design and architecture in French and other European design press, including a visit by a journalist from Elle Decoration and Marie Claire Maison to New Zealand to photograph homes and interview local creators. High-profile Parisian shops exhibited the work, including the Printemps department store, the design shop in the Pompidou Centre and stores at Charles de Gaulle Airport. Designer David Trubridge credits Fry for his work being added to the permanent collection of the art museum of the Pompidou Centre, which Trubridge says is "one of the most important art galleries in the world".

In 2009 Fry started to design sustainable objects himself for inclusion in moa's collection. The Pi collection, a system of metal table legs that can be used with locally sourced wooden tops to make stable dining tables, consoles and desks, is an example of Fry's focus on transporting only parts of objects so that they can be completed by local artisans using local woods. The Pi table was voted best New Zealand table design in 2010 by Urbis magazine.

Fry has featured in New Zealand media, where he wrote about the terrorist attacks in Paris in 2015; and commentated on expat Paris life, the fire of Notre Dame in 2019 and his first novel in 2022.

In 2022, Fry completed his first novel A Message for Nasty, which he began in 1999 when he traced the route across China taken by his late New Zealand grandfather during World War II, who was attempting to organise the escape of Fry's Macau-born grandmother and children from Hong Kong after the Japanese invasion. The historically accurate novel is based on their story. The book was launched at the Auckland Writers Festival on in August, and was the week's top selling New Zealand book within two weeks.

== Personal life ==
Fry shares an apartment in the 11th arrondissement of Paris with his French wife Laurence Varga-Fry and their son. Their Moaroom store is located in the neighbouring 12th arrondissement and their son attends a local public school.

== Publications ==
- The Long White Book, moa – meubles et objets de Aotearoa – sarl, NZ, 2006. ISBN 2952596506.
- A Message for Nasty, Awa Press, NZ, 2022. ISBN 9781927249840.

== See also ==
- List of New Zealand designers and artisans
- List of New Zealand writers
