= List of New Zealand designers and artisans =

The following is a list of New Zealand designers and craftspeople.

- Frank Carpay (1917–1985) – ceramic and textile designer
- Len Castle (1924–2011) – studio potter
- Trelise Cooper – fashion designer
- Kura Te Whiria Ensor (1925–2015) – fashion designer
- Elisabeth Findlay (born 1948) – fashion designer
- Clifton Firth (1904–1980) – graphic designer
- Roderick Fry (born 1969) – furniture designer
- Humphrey Ikin (born 1957) – furniture designer
- Flora MacKenzie (1902–1982) – dressmaker
- Sarah McMurray (1848–1943) – woodcarver and craftswoman
- John Henry Menzies (1839–1919) – woodcarver, cabinet maker and artist
- Keith Murray (1892–1981) – architect and industrial designer
- Kiri Nathan (born 1973) – fashion designer
- Anton Seuffert (1815–1887) – furniture maker
- Ernest Shufflebotham (1908–1984) – ceramicist
- May Smith (1906–1988) – fabric designer
- Rebecca Taylor (born 1969) – fashion designer (moved to United States)
- David Trubridge – furniture and lighting designer
- Karen Walker (born 1969) – fashion designer
