= Hilary Radner =

American-New Zealand media studies academic

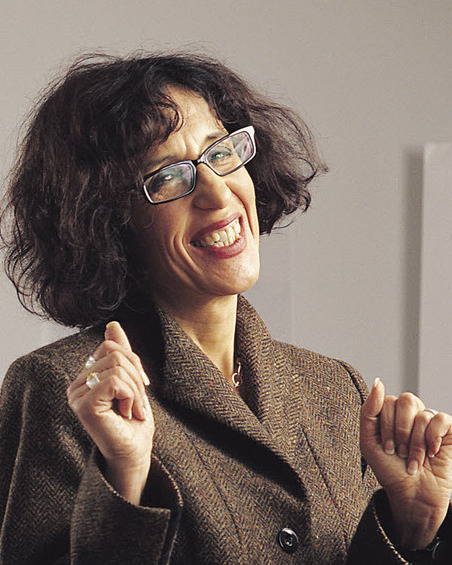
- Radner in 2003

Academic background
- Education: University of Texas at Austin, University of California, Berkeley
- Thesis: Shopping around : locating feminine enunciation through textual practice (c1988)

Academic work
- Discipline: Film and Media Studies
- Sub-discipline: Visual Culture
- Institutions: University of Otago

Hilary Ann Radner Fox is an American–New Zealand film and media studies academic, and is a professor emerita at the University of Otago. Radner researches representations of gender in visual culture.

== Academic career ==
Radner's father was American economist Roy Radner. Radner completed a Master of Arts at University of California at Berkeley, and a PhD titled Shopping around: locating feminine enunciation through textual practice at the University of Texas at Austin. Radner was appointed Foundation Chair of Film and Media Studies at the University of Otago in 2002, after having been an associate professor at the University of Notre Dame. Radner was appointed professor emerita at Otago in 2017.

Radner's research covers feminist film and media studies, and representations of gender in visual culture. Besides film and television, she has written on topics including make-up, fashion photography and women's magazines, celebrity culture, and New Zealand fashion. In 2017 Radner and Vicki Karaminas edited a special issue of the journal Fashion Theory on the moving image and fashion. The issue contained papers from a two-day conference convened by Radner and Karaminas at Massey University in 2017, called "The End of Fashion”.

== Career outside academia ==
In 2019, Radner founded RDS Art Gallery in Dunedin, along with Inge Doesburg and Marie Strauss. She now runs the gallery.

In 2011, Radner and Natalie Smith curated New Zealand's first exhibition of NOM*d garments and memorabilia from NOM*d founder Margarita Robertson. The exhibition, titled Nom*d: The Art of Fashion, was held at the Eastern Southland Gallery in Gore, and contained more than 70 garments.

Radner was a judge of the 2019 New Zealand Collarts Atom Awards.

== Selected books ==
- Radner, Hilary (1994). Shopping Around: Feminine Culture and the Pursuit of Pleasure.New York: Routledge. 232pp.
- Radner, Hilary (2010). Neo-Feminist Cinema: Girly Films, Chick Flicks and Consumer Culture. New York: Routledge. 240pp.
- Radner, Hilary; Stringer, Rebecca, eds. (2011). Feminism at the Movies: Understanding Gender in Contemporary Cinema. New York: Routledge. 320pp.
- Radner, Hilary; Fox, Alistair (1 April 2018). Raymond Bellour: Cinema and the Moving Image. Edinburgh University Press. doi:10.3366/edinburgh/9781474422888.001.0001. ISBN 978-1-4744-2288-8.
- Radner, Hilary. The New Woman's Film; Femme-centric Movies for Smart Chicks. New York: Routledge, 2017. 224pp.
- Fox, Alistair; Marie, Michel; Moine, Raphaëlle; Radner, Hilary, eds. (20 November 2014). A Companion to Contemporary French Cinema. Wiley. doi:10.1002/9781118585405. ISBN 978-1-4443-3899-7.
