= 2008 Birthday Honours (New Zealand) =

Awards list for New Zealand

2008 Queen's Birthday Honours
- Previous: 2008 bravery awards Next: 2009 New Year Honours
- Type: New Zealand royal honours: Order of New Zealand; New Zealand Order of Merit; Queen's Service Order; Queen's Service Medal; Distinguished Service Decoration
- Date: 2 June 2008
- Country: New Zealand

Highlights
- Total recipients: 189

The 2008 Queen's Birthday Honours in New Zealand, celebrating the official birthday of Queen Elizabeth II, were appointments made by the Queen in her right as Queen of New Zealand, on the advice of the New Zealand government, to various orders and honours to reward and highlight good works by New Zealanders. They were announced on 2 June 2008.

The recipients of honours are listed here as they were styled before their new honour.

== Order of New Zealand (ONZ) ==
Ordinary member

- Sir Murray Gordon Halberg MBE – of Auckland.
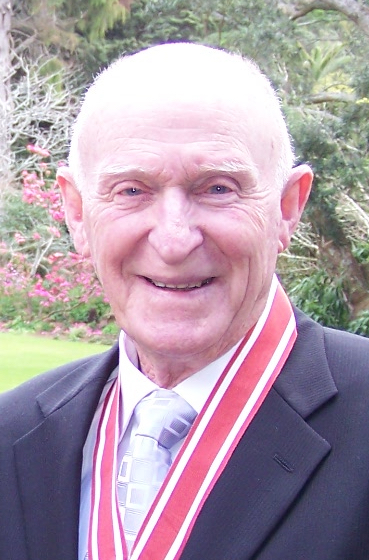
Sir Murray Halberg

== New Zealand Order of Merit ==
=== Distinguished Companion (DCNZM) ===
- Harawira Tiri Gardiner – of Wellington. For services to Māori.
- The Honourable John William Hansen – of Rangiora. For services to the judiciary.
- Peter Charles Maire – of North Shore. For services to business.
- Emeritus Professor Arthur Harold Marshall – of Auckland. For services to acoustical science.
- Gillian Karawe Whitehead MNZM – of Dunedin. For services to music.
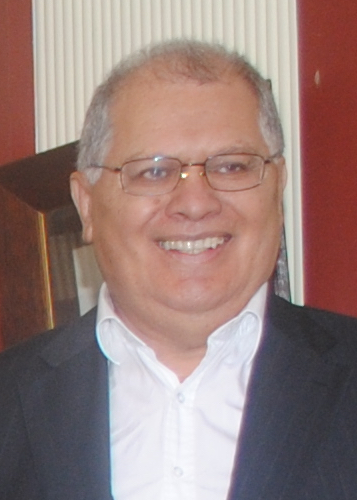
Wira Gardiner

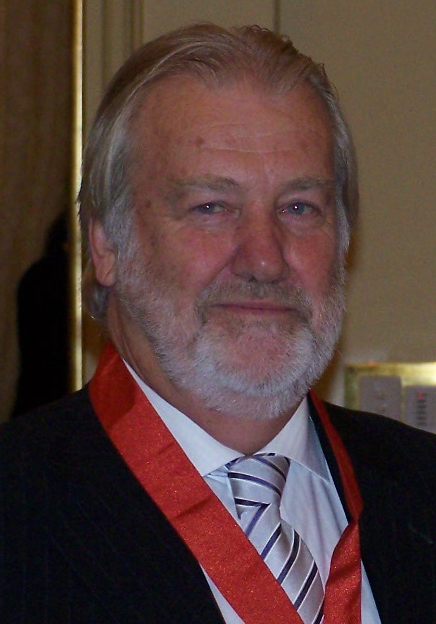
John Hansen

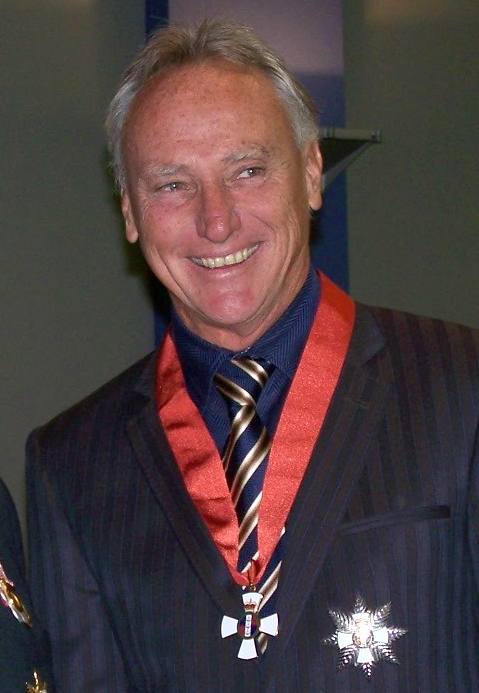
Peter Maire

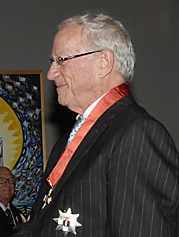
Harold Marshall

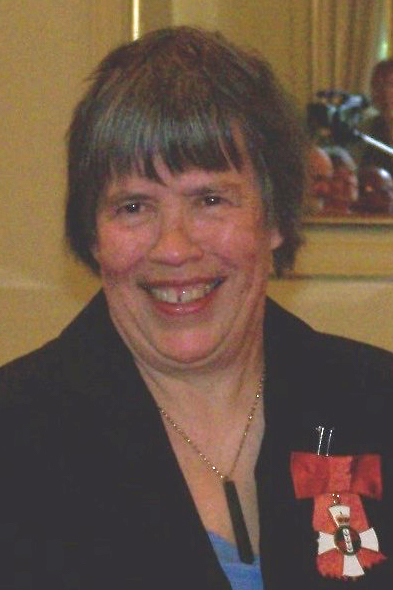
Gillian Whitehead

=== Companion (CNZM) ===
- Fleur Adcock OBE – of London, England. For services to literature.
- Professor Charles Richard William Beasley – of Wellington. For services to medical research, in particular asthma.
- Robert George Mappin Fenwick – of Waiheke Island. For services to conservation and the community.
- Philip Vernon Lough – of Richmond. For services to business.
- Dr Elizabeth Anne Meade QSO – of Wellington. For services to education.
- Diane Elizabeth Morcom – of Wellington. For public services, lately as Secretary of Cabinet and Clerk of the Executive Council. (Note: Morcom was also appointed a Commander of the Royal Victorian Order (CVO) in the 2008 British Queen's Birthday Honours)
- Anthony John Nowell – of Auckland. For services to business.
- Anaru Ririwai Rangiheuea ONZM JP – of Rotorua. For services to Māori and the community.
- Professor Jacqueline Rowarth – of Palmerston North. For services to agricultural science.
- Wynton Alan Whai Rufer – of Auckland. For services to soccer.
- Dr Meon Carolyn Shand – of Wellington. For services to women's health.
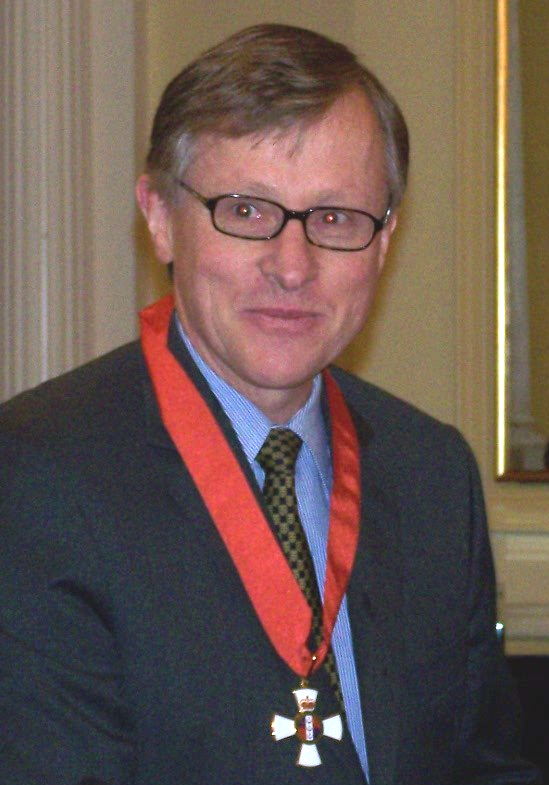
Richard Beasley

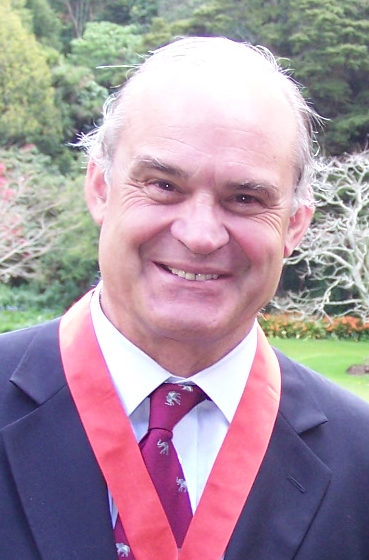
Rob Fenwick

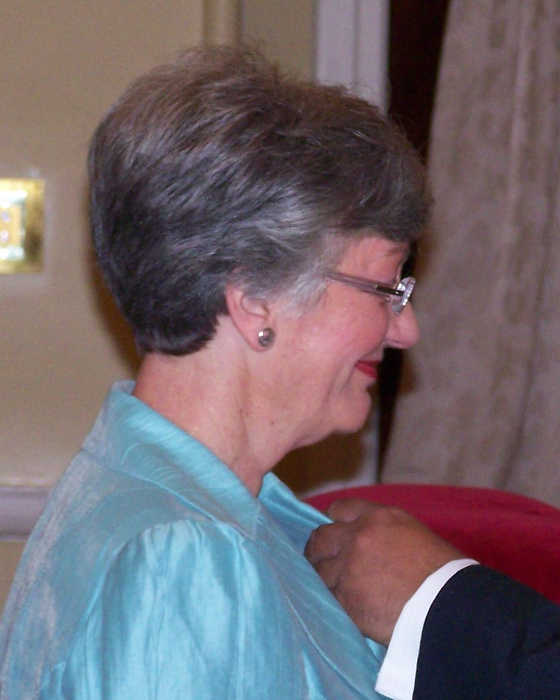
Diane Morcom

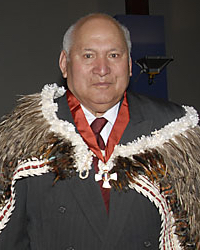
Anaru Rangiheuea

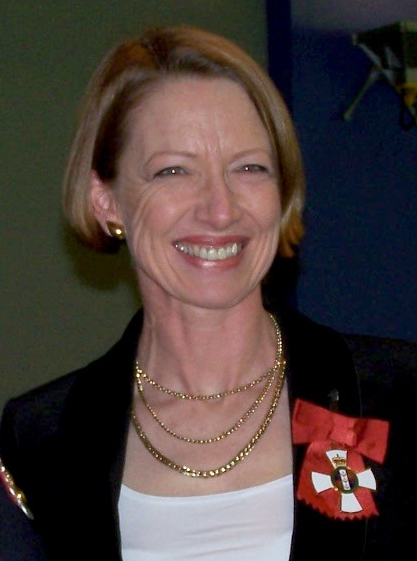
Jacqueline Rowarth

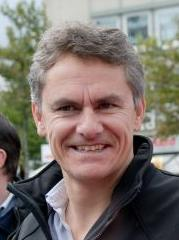
Wynton Rufer

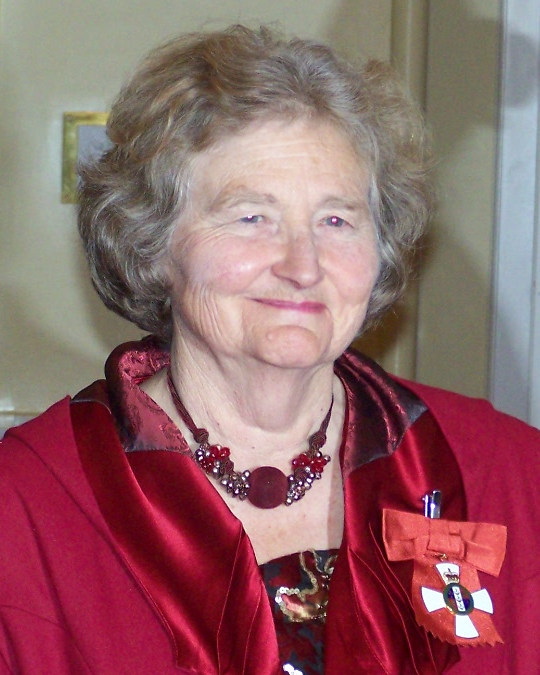
Carol Shand

=== Officer (ONZM) ===
- Dr Francis Angelo Anthony – of Christchurch. For services to medicine, in particular spinal-cord injuries.
- Professor Brian Thomas Brooks – of Lower Hutt. For services to education.
- Professor Keith Craig Cameron – of Lincoln. For services to agricultural research.
- Colonel Arthur John Campbell (Retired) – of Dunedin. For services to returned services personnel.
- Professor Ross Graham Clark – of North Shore. For services to biotechnology.
- Professor Hong Jie Di – of Lincoln. For services to agricultural research.
- John Raymond Eady – of Auckland. For services to music, business and the community.
- Dr John Lewis Edwards – of Auckland. For services to dentistry.
- Elisabeth Findlay – of Auckland. For services to business and fashion.
- Neville John Findlay – of Auckland. For services to business and fashion.
- Lyn Kathleen Gillanders – of Auckland. For services to dietetics.
- David Thomas Howden – of Ashburton. For services to outdoor recreation and the environment.
- Tufuga Holoatu Nesi Lagatule QSM – of Christchurch. For services to the Pacific Islands community and women.
- Derek Arana Te Ahi Lardelli – of Gisborne. For services to Māori arts, in particular tā moko.
- Thomas Cedric Larkin – of Wellington. For services to New Zealand–Japan relations.
- Professor Martin Richard Manning – of Lower Hutt. For services to climate-change science.
- Dr Diana Rae Martin – of Waikanae. For services to microbiology.
- Dr Dianne McCarthy – of Wellington. For services to education.
- Dr Diane Helen Menzies – of Christchurch. For services to the environment.
- Professor Alison Ruth Mercer – of Dunedin. For services to science.
- Warwick George Roger – of North Shore. For services to journalism.
- Pauline Annette Savage – of Wellington. For services to arts administration.
- Dr Olive Jean Webb – of Hororata. For services to people with intellectual disabilities.

Additional

- Colonel Paul Willem Van Den Broek – Colonels' List, Royal New Zealand Army.
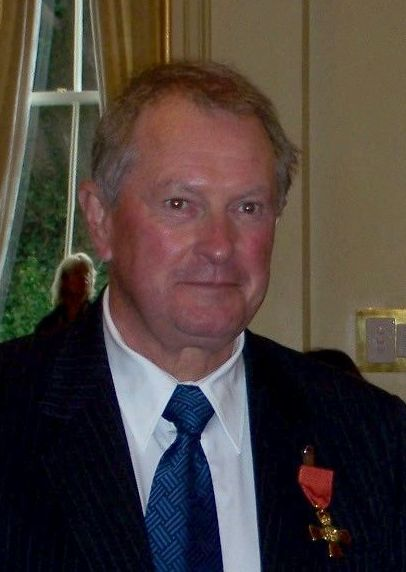
Brian Brooks

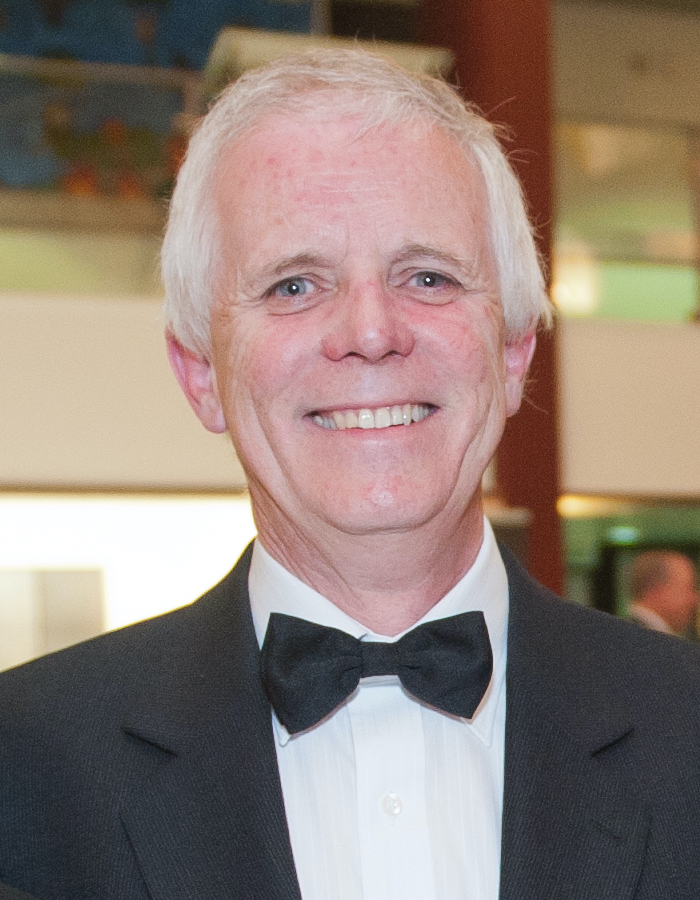
Keith Cameron

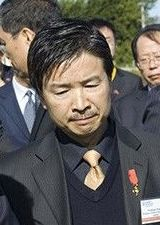
Hong Di

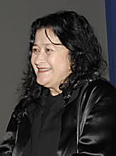
Liz Findlay

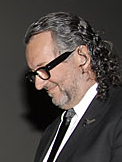
Neville Findlay

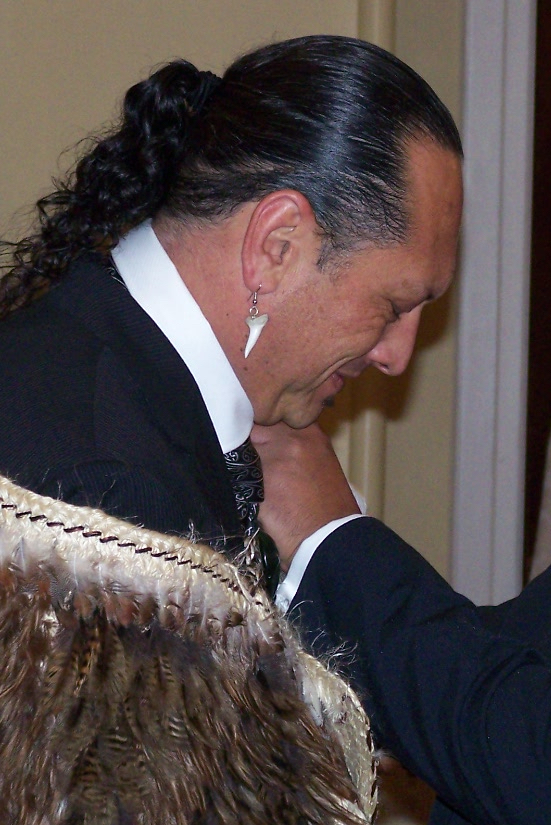
Derek Lardelli

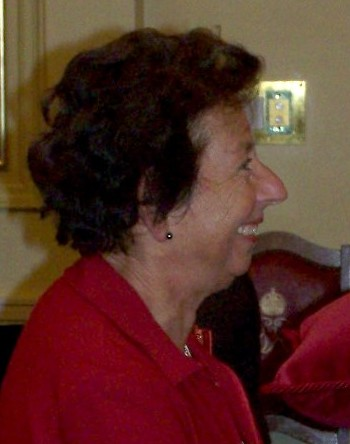
Diana Martin

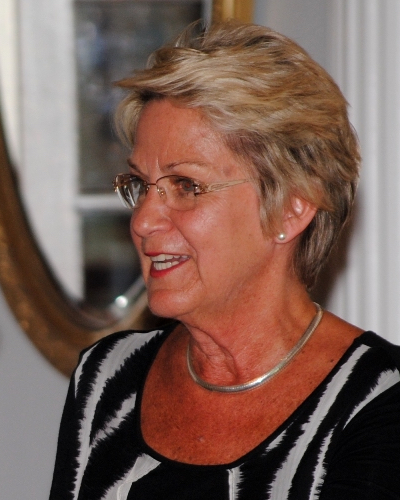
Di McCarthy

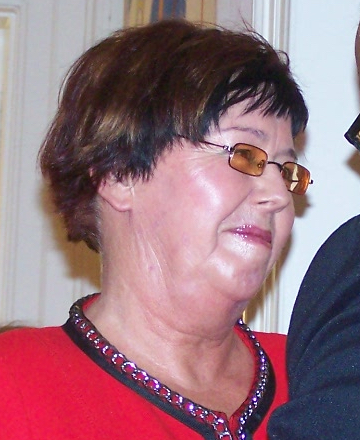
Diane Menzies

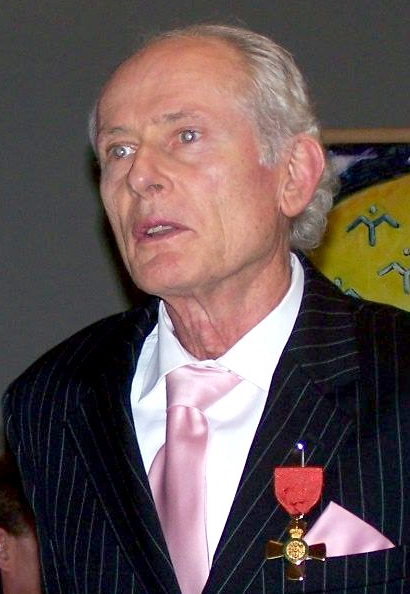
Warwick Roger

=== Member (MNZM) ===
- Diane Margaret Baguley – of Auckland. For services to business.
- Arihia Darryl Bennett – of Kaiapoi. For services to Māori and the community.
- William Alfred Brien JP – of Wellington. For services to sport and the community.
- Alan Leonard Broadbent – of Santa Monica, California. For services to jazz music.
- Suzanne Lynette Carty – of Wellington. For services to journalism.
- Colleen Shona Cole – of Lyttelton. For services to Scottish dance and culture.
- Christopher Robert Darlow – of North Shore. For services to the law.
- Dr Rosemary Joy De Luca – of Hamilton. For services to ethics.
- Rudra Gamini de Zoysa – of Lower Hutt. For services to the Sri Lankan community.
- Judith Ann Dixon – of Hamilton. For services to primary education.
- Simon Christopher Edwards – of Lower Hutt. For services to journalism.
- Gerald James Ellott – of Waiheke Island. For services to philately.
- Gerald Barnett Fell – of Longburn. For services to the Thoroughbred racing and breeding industry.
- Dr Leslie Henry Galler – of Auckland. For services to medicine.
- Anthony William Gilbert – of Alexandra. For services to rugby and education.
- Anne Stewart Gover – of Gore. For services to education.
- Patricia Anne Hanlen – of Tauranga. For services to the community.
- Margot Hart JP – of Auckland. For services to the Citizens Advice Bureau and the community.
- Dr Peter Keith Harwood – of Auckland. For services to Māori and the community.
- Joseph Parata Hawke – of Auckland. For services to Māori and the community.
- Dr Ngapare Kaihina Hopa – of Hamilton. For services to Māori.
- Whaearangi Rangi Inia – of Auckland. For services to Māori and the community.
- Douglas Lloyd Jenkins – of Napier. For services to design.
- James Anthony Jessep JP – of Blenheim. For services to marine farming and the community.
- Ross William Jewell – of Auckland. For services to business.
- Colonel Timothy James Keating – Colonel's List, Royal New Zealand Army
- Dayle Elizabeth Mace – of Auckland. For services to the arts and the community.
- John Russell McCormick – of Palmerston North. For services to music, in particular jazz.
- Alma Edmond Mihaere – of Lower Hutt. For services to Māori.
- Hinewehi Mohi – of Auckland. For services to Māori.
- Jeremy Ross Moon – of Wellington. For services to business.
- Dr Wendy Alison Nelson – of Wellington. For services to the marine environment.
- Kilda Mori Northcott – of Dunedin. For services to dance.
- Dr Sally Pairman – of Dunedin. For services to women's health.
- Molly Easther Lillian Pardoe – of Gisborne. For services to Māori health.
- Peter Paul Posa – of Te Awamutu. For services to entertainment.
- Michael Philip Shepherd – of Auckland. For services to art.
- Commander Peter Graeme Sullivan – Royal New Zealand Navy
- Crofton Roscoe Tait – of Auckland. For services to land search and rescue.
- Cassidy Wehipeihana Tangaere – of Wellington. For services to Māori language education.
- Robert Wayne Taylor – of Suva, Fiji. For services to the New Zealand Customs Service.
- Robert Tilsley – of Tuakau. For services to agriculture and the community.
- Andrew Moke Timoti – of Rotorua. For services to touch rugby.
- Desmond Thomas Townson – of Manukau. For services to yachting.
- Michael Cliff Tuffery – of Wellington. For services to art.
- Tuigamala Va'aiga Lealuga Tuigamala II – of Waitakere (West Auckland). For services to rugby and the community.
- Jennifer Anne Vernon, JP – of Raglan. For services to the community.

Honorary

- Manuel Franklin Herrera – of Montevideo, Uruguay. For services to New Zealand–Uruguayan relations.
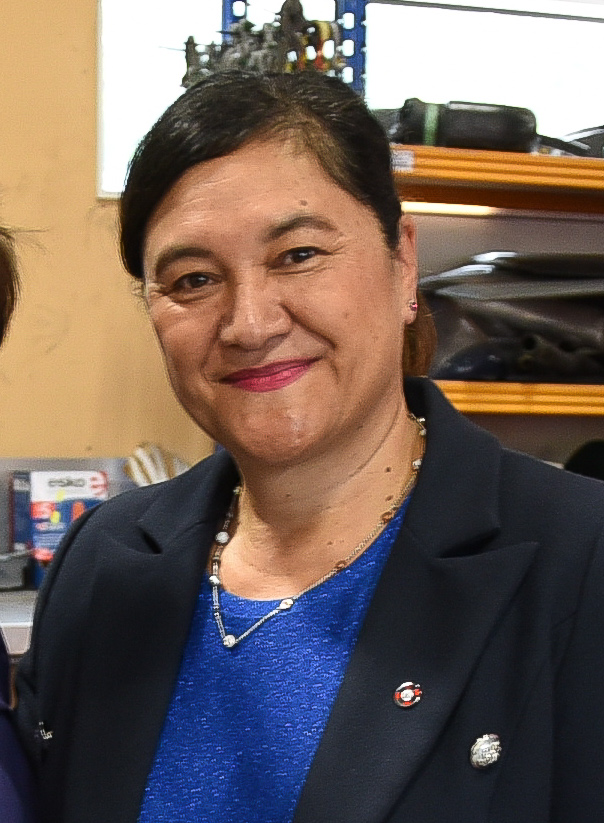
Arihia Bennett

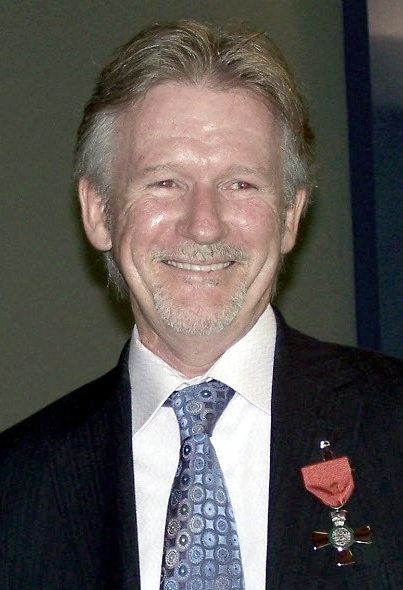
Alan Broadbent

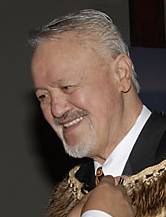
Joe Hawke

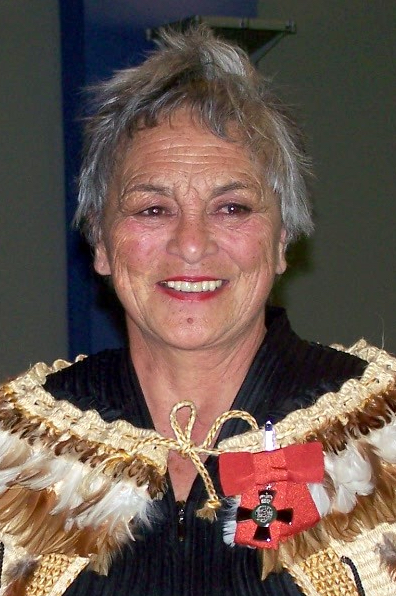
Ngapare Hopa

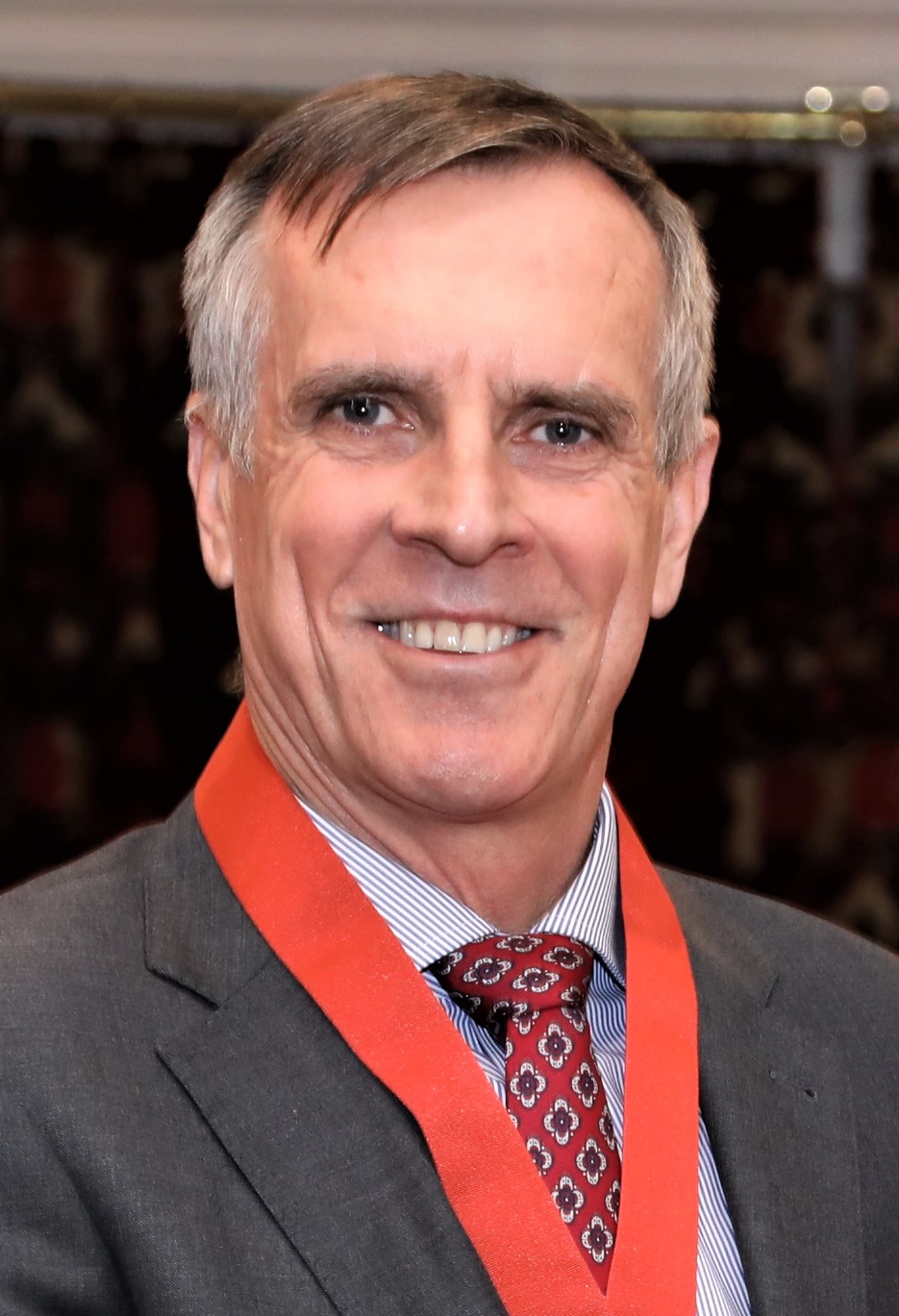
Tim Keating

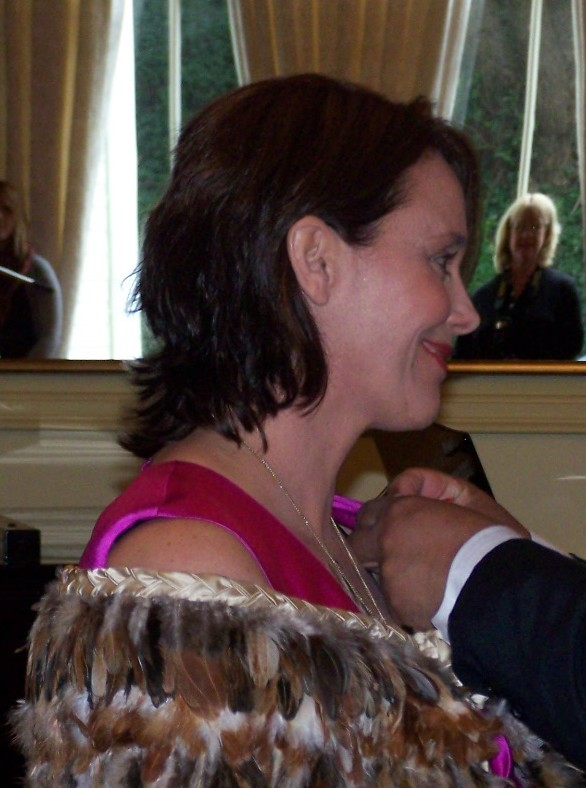
Hinewehi Mohi

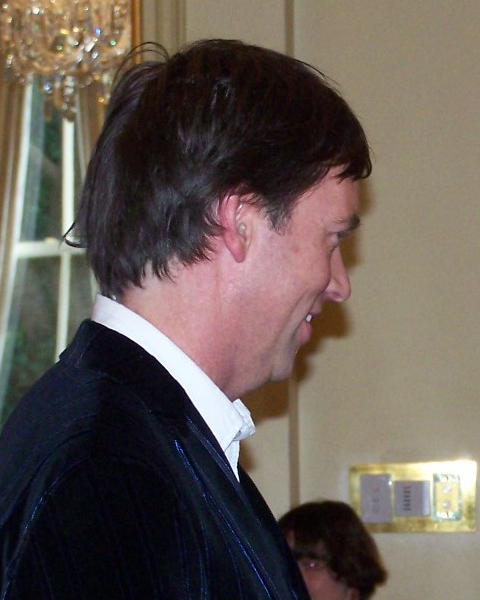
Jeremy Moon

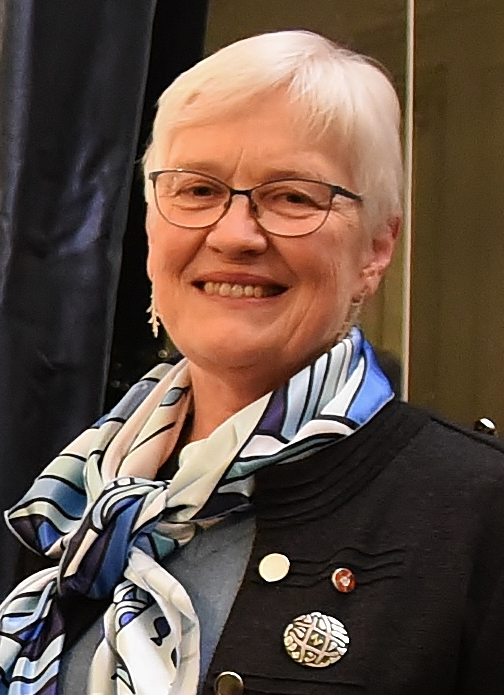
Wendy Nelson

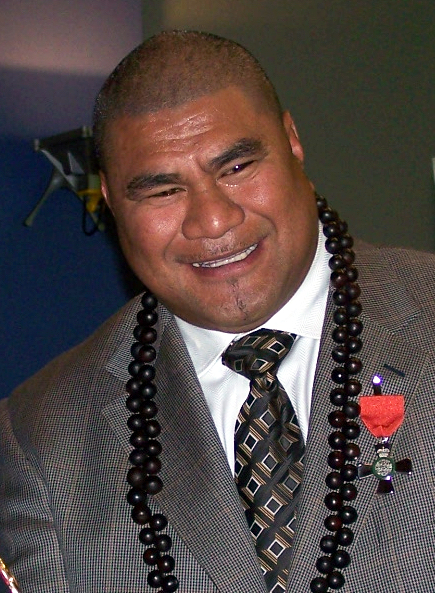
Va'aiga Tuigamala

== Companion of the Queen's Service Order (QSO) ==
- Misatauveve Dr Melani Anae – of Auckland. For services to the Pacific Islands community.
- Gail Patricia Collingwood – of Nelson. For services to local-body affairs, women and the community.
- The Honourable Brian John Donnelly – of Rarotonga. For public services.
- Kathleen Jillian Dooley – of Manukau. For services to special education.
- Dianne Patricia Hale JP – of North Shore. For services to local-body affairs.
- Tione Haunui – of Ngāruawāhia. For services to Māori.
- Beverly Ann Magee – of Waitakere. For services to local government and the environment.
- John Robert Martin – of Wellington. For public services.
- Susan Leigh McLachlan – of Manukau. For services to education.
- Marilyn Joy Quigley – of Kerikeri. For public services.
- Professor Ann Kathleen Richardson – of Christchurch. For services to public health.
- John Struan Robertson – of Papakura. For public services and services to local-body affairs.
- Dr Martin Joseph Sullivan – of Palmerston North. For services to people with disabilities.
- Te Wano Walters – of Te Puke. For services to Māori.
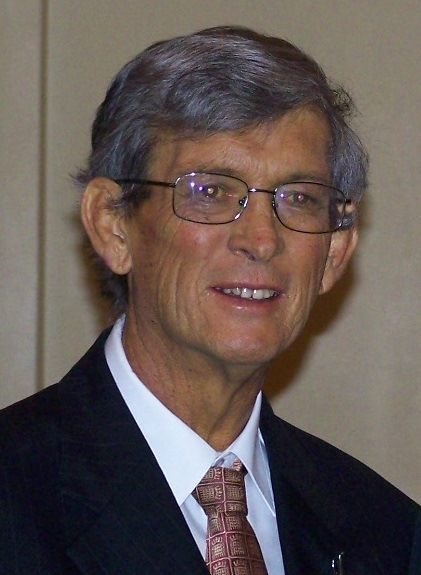
Brian Donnelly

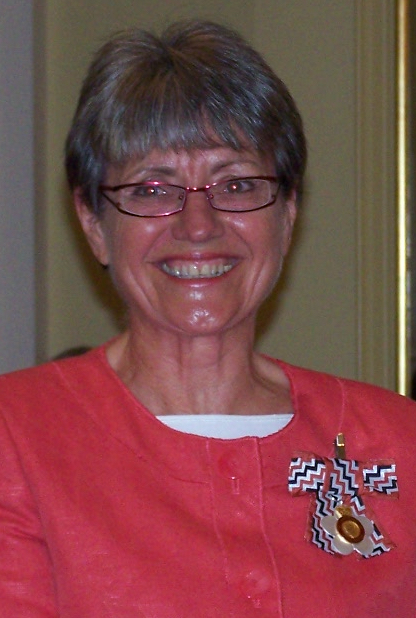
Joy Quigley

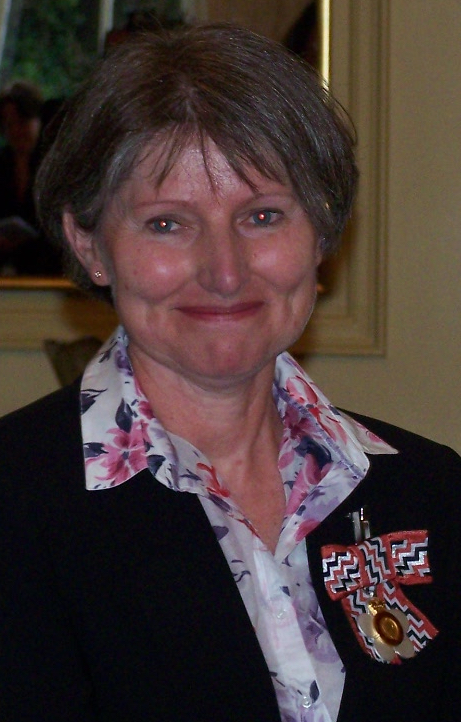
Ann Richardson

== Queen's Service Medal (QSM) ==
- Shirley Ellen Alabaster – of Alexandra. For services to the community.
- Helen Marie Algar – of Oamaru. For services to health and disability issues.
- Eleanor Joan Parehina Barton – of Hamilton. For services to Māori and the community.
- Phyllis Mabel Bawden – of Kohukohu. For services to the community.
- Pembroke Peraniko Bird – of Murupara. For services to education.
- David Boston – of Napier. For services to music.
- Shirley Margaret Bosworth – of Dunedin. For services to the prevention of domestic violence.
- Ann Elizabeth Carran – of Te Anau. For services to conservation.
- Wayne Francis Carran – of Te Anau. For services to conservation.
- Jean Kathleen Chamberlain – of Ōtaki. For services to the community.
- Hasmukh (Hari) Chhagan JP – of Rotorua. For services to the Indian community and sport.
- Squadron Leader Shane Andrew Cole – of Christchurch. For services to the New Zealand Cadet Forces.
- Vincent Joseph Collins – of Auckland. For services to the hospitality industry and the community.
- Gladys Joan Coombe – of Te Aroha. For services to the Order of St John and the community.
- Koroneihana Cooper JP – of Ngāruawāhia. For services to Māori.
- Joseph John Currie – of Nelson. For services to the community.
- Mary Elizabeth Dunnet JP – of Tīrau. For services to local-body affairs and the community.
- Paula Marie Enoka – of North Shore; constable, New Zealand Police. For services to the New Zealand Police.
- Ataga'i Esera – of Christchurch. For services to the Pacific Islands community.
- Marie Therese Faith-Allen – of Warkworth. For services to the Department of Corrections.
- David Alexander Field JP – of Rotorua. For services to forestry and the community.
- Brother Kieran Jeremiah Noel Oliver Garvey – of Wellington. For services to prison chaplaincy.
- Donald Richard Gerrand – of Cambridge; chief fire officer, Cambridge Volunteer Fire Brigade. For services to the New Zealand Fire Service.
- Helen Louisa Gordon – of Taihape. For services to music.
- Elizabeth Sarah Grubb – of St Andrews. For services to drama education and the community.
- David William Haddock – of Whakatāne. For services to the maritime industry and the community.
- Tamati Waka Tenene Heperi JP – of Hamilton. For services to the community.
- Dr Patricia Dorothy Hill – of Wellington. For services to community health.
- Ian Sinclair Hogarth – of Whangārei. For services to conservation and wildlife management.
- Rex Neville Hoskin – of Hastings. For services to mountain safety.
- Frances Mary Jessep – of Blenheim. For services to the community.
- Peter John Kamstra – of Wanganui; lately senior sergeant, New Zealand Police. For services to the New Zealand Police.
- Judith Ann Karaitiana JP – of Wanganui. For services to the community.
- Dennis John Keall – of Lower Hutt. For services to herpetology.
- Philip Stephen Kirkham – of Auckland; detective sergeant, New Zealand Police. For services to the New Zealand Police.
- Barry Leishman Lawrence – of Queenstown. For services to local-body affairs and the environment.
- David James Lawrence JP – of Waitakere. For services to the community.
- Colin James Lawrie – of Levin; senior station officer, Levin Volunteer Fire Brigade. For services to the New Zealand Fire Service.
- Janett Helene Leaf – of Kaikohe. For services to the community.
- Catherine May Mair – of Katikati. For services to poetry and the community.
- Dr Alan John Mangan – of Wanganui. For services to medicine and health administration.
- Graham Gordon Mason – of Westport. For services to brass bands.
- Alexander Ross Matheson JP – of Inglewood. For services to the community.
- Jacqueline Imelda Mauriri – of Hāwera. For services to Māori.
- David Alan McKenzie – of Kaitaia; station officer, Kaitaia Volunteer Fire Brigade. For services to the New Zealand Fire Service.
- Michael Rereao Mohi – of Waipukurau. For services to conservation.
- Noreen Linda Moorhouse – of Whangarei. For services to Māori and the community.
- Bernard William Murphy – of Stratford. For services to sheepdog trials.
- Robin Anthony Ian Nairn – of Havelock North. For services to the Anglican church and the community.
- Pratima Devi Nand JP – of Auckland. For services to the Indian community.
- Barbara Ann Olsen – of Cambridge. For services to Māori.
- Cushla Maree O'Shea – of Auckland; detective, New Zealand Police. For services to the New Zealand Police.
- Rangi Anewa Parker – of Hamilton. For services to historical research.
- Captain (Retired) Malcolm James Pearson – of Lyttelton. For services to yachting.
- Ronald Owen Pennell – of Waitakere; senior volunteer fire officer, Waitakere City Fire District. For services to the New Zealand Fire Service.
- Avis Margaret Peterson – of Te Awamutu. For services to the community.
- Edward Neill Pickard – of Christchurch. For services to music, in particular jazz.
- Jeffrey Steven Rackley – of Nelson. For services to sport and the community.
- Ian Garth Renall – of Carterton. For services to the community.
- Monica Bernadette Renwick – of Christchurch. For services to education.
- Elizabeth June Rock – of Reefton. For services to health.
- Donald Sew Hoy – of Auckland. For services to the Chinese community.
- Jennie Sew Hoy – of Auckland. For services to the Chinese community.
- Shirley Muriel Spurr JP – of Waihi. For services to the community.
- Afioga Tagaloa Nua Su'a – of Christchurch. For services to the Pacific Islands community.
- James Budd Swindells – of Te Kūiti. For services to conservation.
- Jean Fay Swindells – of Te Kūiti. For services to conservation.
- Sandra Christine Terewi JP – of Turakina. For services to the community.
- Eric Arthur Thorpe – of Napier. For services to music.
- Rhona Mary Thorpe – of Christchurch. For services to migrant and refugee communities.
- Michael Featherston Toogood – of Hastings. For services to helicopter ambulance services.
- Lieutenant Colonel Graeme Taiuru Vercoe (Retired) – of Rotorua. For public services.
- Dr Michael Louis Vidulich – of Auckland. For services to music.
- The Reverend Janice Ann Wallace – of Pukekohe. For services to mathematics education and the community.
- Vaoga Mary Lelefua Watts – of Waitakere. For services to the Pacific Islands community.
- Richard Keith Wright – of Blenheim. For services to the community.
- Sharon Mary Connolly Young – of Waitakere. For services to the community.

Honorary

- William Frank Grubb – of St Andrews. For services to music and the community.
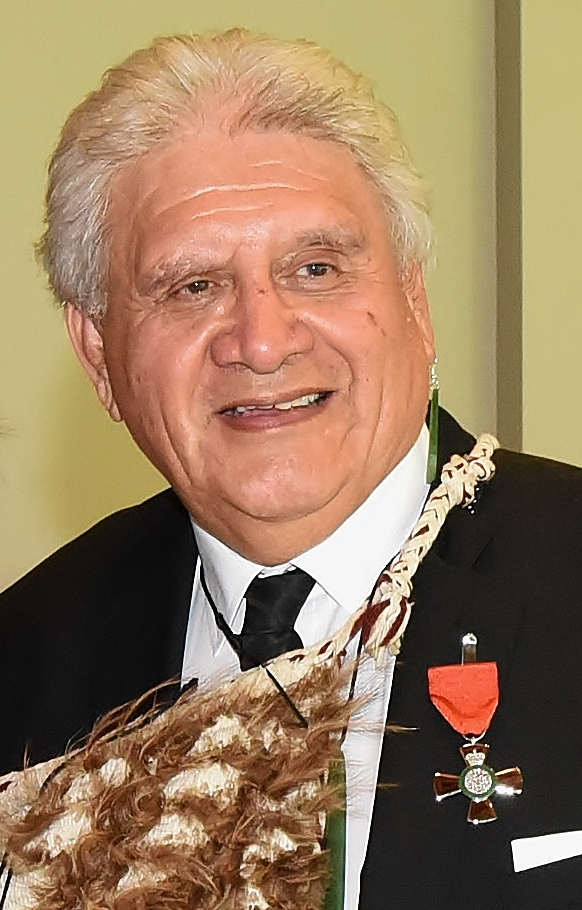
Pem Bird

== New Zealand Distinguished Service Decoration (DSD) ==
- Squadron Leader Gregory John Burroughs – Royal New Zealand Air Force.
- Lieutenant Colonel Helen Joy Cooper – Royal New Zealand Army Logistic Regiment (The Duke of York's Own).
- Captain Michael Peter De Boer – Corps of Royal New Zealand Engineers.
- Squadron Leader Timothy Richard Evans – Royal New Zealand Air Force.
- Squadron Leader Timothy Hopkins – Royal New Zealand Air Force.
- Warrant Officer Robert David Joseph Martelletti – Royal New Zealand Air Force.
- Warrant Officer Weapon Technician Wayne Robert Morris – Royal New Zealand Navy.
- Major Christopher Gerard Mortiboy – Royal New Zealand Corps of Signals.
