= Pem Bird =

New Zealand politician

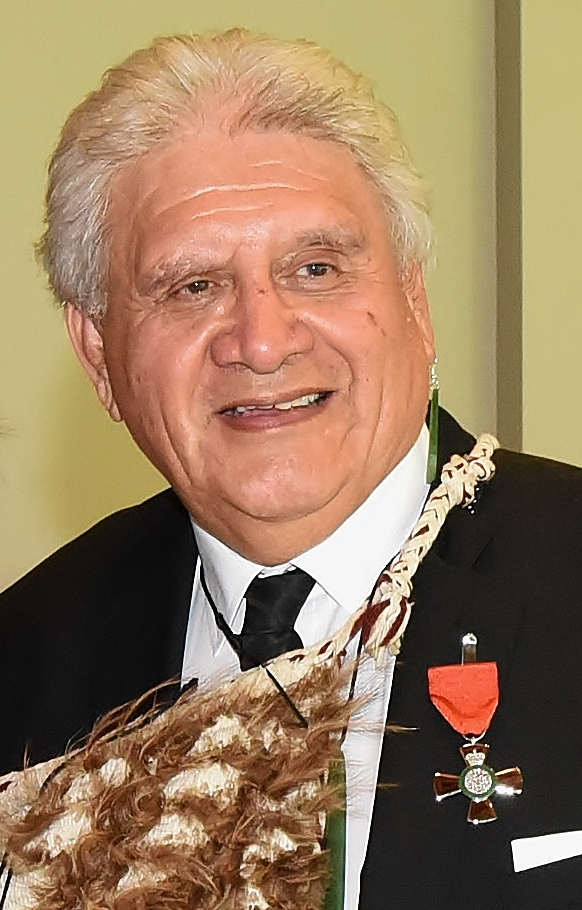
Bird in 2017

Pembroke Peraniko "Pem" Bird MNZM QSM is a New Zealand educator and Māori community leader. From 2010 to 2013, he was President of the Māori Party.

In the 2008 Queen's Birthday Honours, Bird was awarded the Queen's Service Medal, for services to education. In the 2017 Queen's Birthday Honours, he was appointed a Member of the New Zealand Order of Merit, for services to education and Māori.

In 2017, Bird was ordered to complete a defensive driving course by the Teachers Disciplinary Tribunal, he was fined and disqualified from driving in September 2016 after being caught speeding at 169km/h. As a result, the tribunal stated he was not allowed to drive any student (he is Principal of a Māori Immersion School, Te Kura Kaupapa Motuhake o Tawhiuau) until he completed the course. He alleged he was being tailgated but no evidence was provided to support this. He has had over 20 driving offences.

In October 2021, Bird came out publicly against the Pfizer vaccine, saying his community of Murupara won't be getting the jab just yet. Ministry of Health data at that time shows that of the 1400 residents in Murupara, only 32 per cent have had their first dose and just 16 per cent are fully vaccinated.

Bird has been a vocal advocate of his close friend, Dr Bernard Conlin, a local Murupara GP, who has spoken out against the Covid-19 vaccine and is currently awaiting the outcome of a Medical Council hearing, after questioning the rollout of the vaccine to young people and pregnant women at a community meeting.

Murupara is the least vaccinated town in New Zealand.

In 2022, Bird joined the New Zealand Outdoors Party.
