= NOM*d =

New Zealand fashion design label

NOM*d is a New Zealand fashion design label established in 1986 by Margarita and Chris Robertson. The brand is renowned for their dark and sombre aesthetic that draws heavily on gothic influences and local cultural references. NOM*d was founded in the historic city of Dunedin, in the Otago Region of New Zealand's South Island.

== Origins ==
Margarita had learned sewing from her mother, accomplished seamstress Zinovia Gladiadis, and was inspired by her older sister, Elisabeth Findlay, who founded New Zealand brand Zambesi. These influences, combined with her love of second hand shopping and the lack of high-end labels she liked in local Dunedin stores, lead Margarita to begin her career in the fashion industry.

In 1975, Margarita and Chris created Hang-Ups (1975-1981), a boutique clothing store which stocked 80s brands such as The Case is Altered, Vamp, and Elle, as well as having a contract with Australian label Jag. Several years later, the couple opened Plume, the store which prompted the birth of NOM*d when Margarita saw an opening to create her own exclusive brand of knitwear. This decision was also inspired by the cold climate of Dunedin and the close proximity of quality yarn suppliers Roslyn Woollen Mills.

== Early years (1980s-1990s) ==
NOM*d's early collections demonstrated the brands focus on a limited, black, colour palette and utilitarian elements. The first collection offered a summer and winter knitwear range, included in a release of 10 womenswear styles.

Margarita was heavily inspired by the gothic undertones of Dunedin, in addition to the work of Japanese designers such as Issey Miyake, Rei Kawakubo, and Yohji Yamamoto. The brand was founded on eight design principles aligned with the international conceptual fashion movement. This principles included, "constructivism, vintage and reappropriation, multiple-possibility garments, bricolage, street-wear conventions, the androgynous bulky body, an anti-consumer aesthetic in a consumer environment and a self-consciousness and reflexivity, which is the primary tactic to which the previous seven tactics defer."

NOM*d was exclusively a knitwear brand until 1998 when they were invited to London Fashion Week (LFW). NOM*d debuted in LFW as part of the 'New Zealand Four' alongside Zambesi, WORLD, and Karen Walker.

"Prior to London fashion Week we’d always shown our knitwear alongside Zambesi on a New Zealand stage, but for this event we felt it was important to be recognized as a brand of our own. People had this perception that we were part of Zambesi, but that’s never been the case, it was just Liz and I working together in the same industry."

For its new international audience, NOM*d produced utilitarian-inspired garments that received widespread popularity.

One of NOM*d's most prominent collections was Quiet Revolution (A-W 1999-2000), which reworked women's bowling skirts. The collection was also significant as it marked the brand's decision to expand into made-to-order wovens, which were geared towards the Australian market. Quiet Revolution achieved significant success, and one outfit from the collection was also featured in the exhibition Tokyo Vogue (Griffith University, Queensland College of Art, 28 October – 4 December 1999) which put two New Zealand fashion houses, Zambesi and NOM*d, in conversation with major Japanese designers.

== Awards and successes ==
NOM*d was worn by musician and celebrity Rihanna in her advertisement for Puma.

In 2011, Hilary Radner and Natalie Smith curated New Zealand's first exhibition of NOM*d garments and memorabilia from NOM*d founder Margarita Robertson.
