= Jacqueline Rowarth =

New Zealand academic and science communicator

Jacqueline Rowarth CNZM
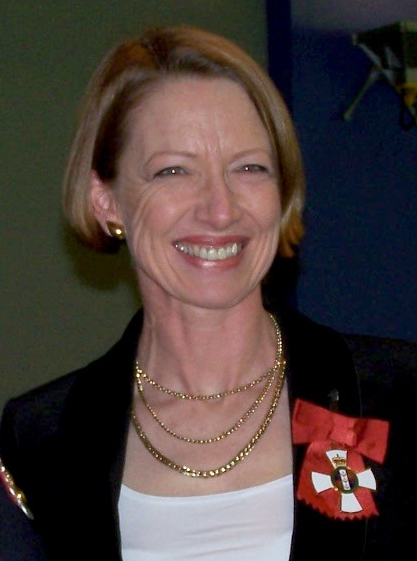
- Rowarth in 2008
- Born: Jacqueline Sara Rowarth; 1956 (age 69–70); St Albans, Hertfordshire, England
- Education: Massey University
- Occupations: Agronomist; dairy farmer
- Scientific career
- Workplaces: AgResearch; Lincoln University; Unitec; University of Melbourne; Massey University; University of Waikato
- Thesis: Phosphate cycling in grazed hill-country pasture (1987)

Jacqueline Sara Rowarth CNZM (born 1956) is a New Zealand agronomist, dairy farmer and science administrator.

== Career ==
Rowarth was born at St Albans, Hertfordshire, England. She moved to New Zealand in 1976 and has an agricultural science degree with first-class honours in environmental agriculture, and obtained a PhD in soil science from Massey University, with a 1987 thesis titled Phosphate cycling in grazed hill-country pasture. She worked at AgResearch for six years before teaching plant science at Lincoln University. From 2000 to 2004, she was dean of the postgraduate division and director of research at Unitec Institute of Technology. She was briefly associate professor at the University of Melbourne, from 2005 to 2006. She returned to New Zealand as a professor, teaching at Massey and the University of Waikato.

In October 2016, Rowarth left Waikato to become the first chief scientist of the Environmental Protection Authority (EPA). In 2018, she resigned from her role at the EPA; it was later revealed that the EPA was warned Rowarth's behaviour was damaging trust in the organisation, apparently due to comments to the media about environmentalist concerns that she deemed unwarranted. According to Rowarth, she was often misquoted.

Rowarth became a farmer-elected representative on the board of DairyNZ. In 2024, she is a director, and also adjunct professor at Lincoln University.

== Views ==
Rowarth has strongly criticised veganism. She has argued that a vegan diet will not save the planet from climate change and has also argued that an omnivorous diet including a moderate amount of dairy products and meat delivers the required nutrients per person for least environmental impact.

Rowarth has also criticised regenerative agriculture based on the restoration of soil fertility through techniques like water retention and composting, and supports the intensification of agricultural practices with higher levels of inputs and output per unit area.

== Honours and awards ==
In the 2008 Queen's Birthday Honours, Rowarth was appointed a Companion of the New Zealand Order of Merit, for services to agricultural science. In 2024, she was awarded the Jubilee Medal by the New Zealand Institute of Agricultural and Horticultural Science, for "her contribution to primary resource science as a leader in research, education, technology transfer and communication".

== Selected publications ==
- Rowarth, Jacqueline (1987). Phosphate cycling in grazed hill-country pasture (Thesis). Massey University.
- Rowarth, Jacqueline; Cookson, W. R; Cornforth, I. S. (2002). "Winter soil temperature (2–15 °C) effects on nitrogen transformations in clover green manure amended or unamended soils; a laboratory and field study". Soil Biology and Biochemistry. 34 (10): 1401–1415. Bibcode:2002SBiBi..34.1401C. doi:10.1016/S0038-0717(02)00083-4.
