= Arihia Bennett =

New Zealand chief executive

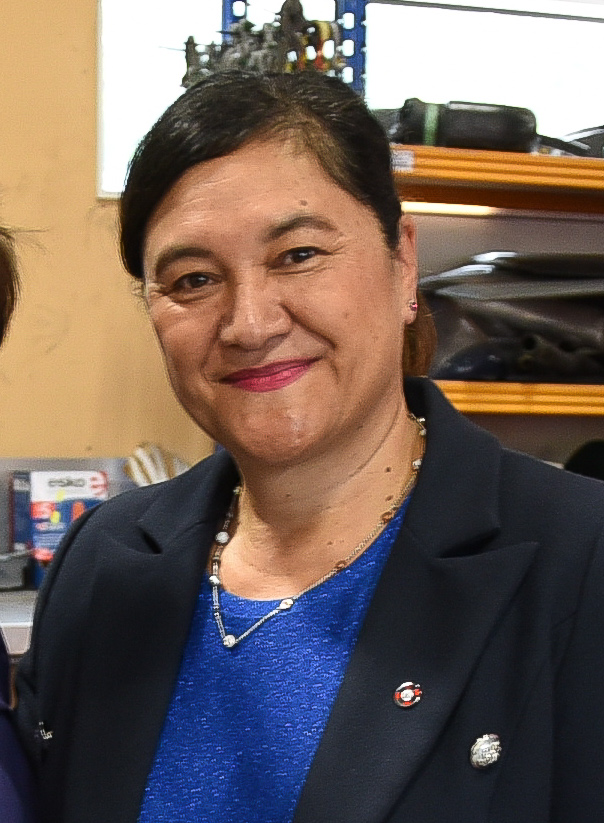
Bennett in 2019

Arihia Darryl Bennett CNZM (née Ruwhiu) is a New Zealand Māori leader. She was the chief executive officer of Te Rūnanga o Ngāi Tahu in New Zealand's South Island for almost 12 years, resigning the position in 2024. She is a member of Ngāi Tahu, Ngāti Porou and Ngāpuhi iwi.

== Biography ==
Bennett attended St Margaret's College, Christchurch. She started her career in social work, and worked for the government agency Child, Youth & Family and for the non-governmental agency Barnado's. From 1999 to 2002 she was a director for Ngāi Tahu Development Corporation, and served as chair from 2002 to 2005. In 2011 Bennett was appointed chief executive of He Oranga Pounamu, the iwi (tribe) organisation responsible for health and social services in the South Island. In 2012 she was appointed chief executive officer of the iwi, becoming the first female to hold the position.

Bennett has held several advisory roles, including Commissioner to the Canterbury Earthquake Recovery Commission (CERC) following the September 2010 earthquake. She is a member of the Pūhara Mana Tangata Māori advisory panel to the Ombudsman's Office and a member of the New Zealand-China Council. She has served on the boards of Barnardos NZ and the Christchurch Women's Refuge (now known as Aviva). In 2021 Bennett was appointed chair of the Ministerial Advisory Group on the Government's Response to the Royal Commission of Inquiry into the 2019 terrorist attack on Christchurch mosques.

Bennett is an alumna of graduate business school INSEAD Fontainebleau.

In 2024, Bennett resigned as chief-executive of Ngāi Tahu, after almost 12 years in the role. She was the longest-serving CEO to date.

== Honours and awards ==
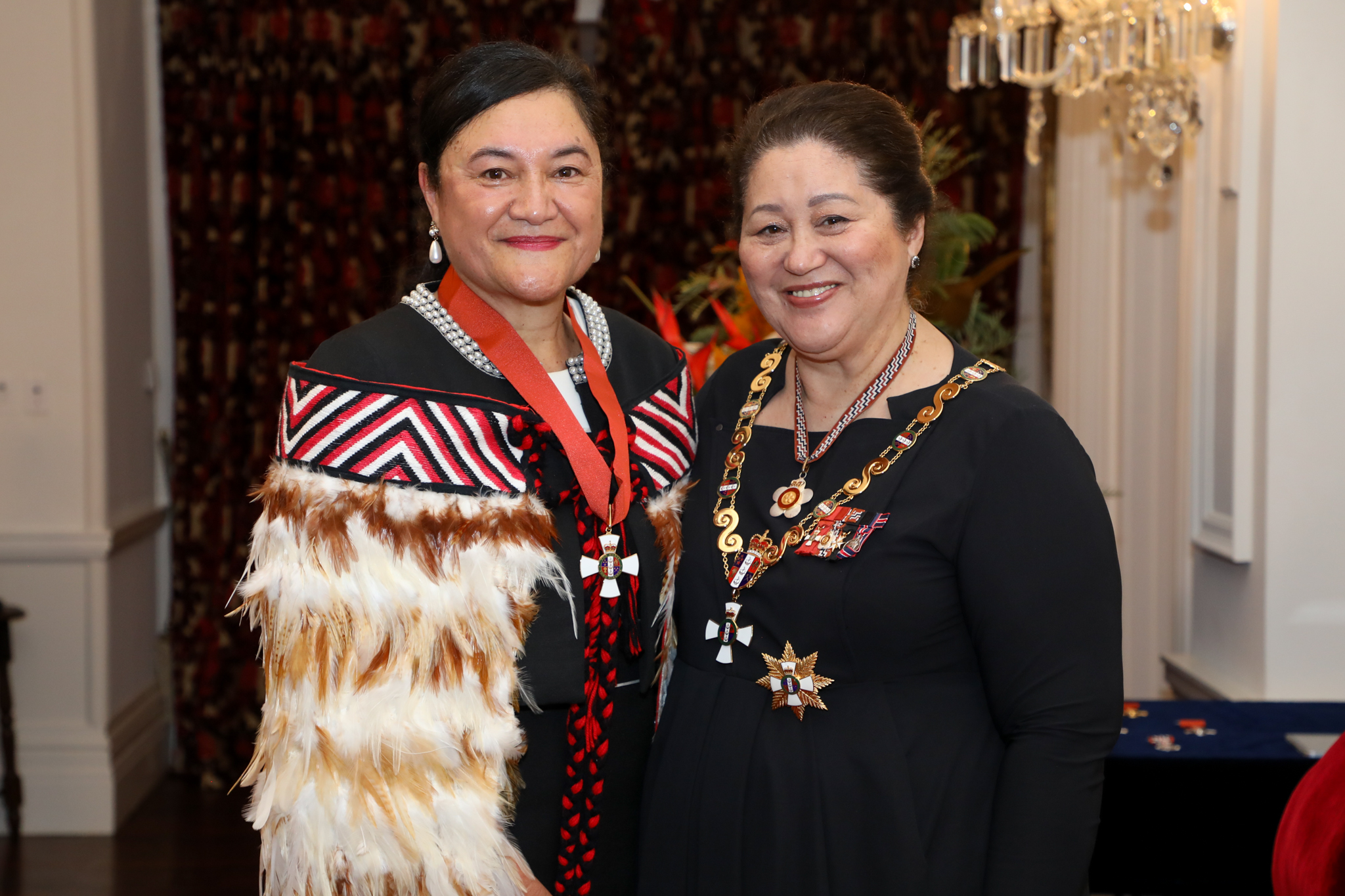
Bennett (left), after her investiture as a Companion of the New Zealand Order of Merit by the governor-general, Dame Cindy Kiro, at Government House, Wellington, on 30 April 2025

In the 2008 Queen's Birthday Honours, Bennett was appointed a Member of the New Zealand Order of Merit, for services to Māori and the community. In the 2024 King’s Birthday Honours, she was promoted to Companion of the New Zealand Order of Merit, for services to Māori, governance and the community.
