= Gerald Ellott =

New Zealand architect and philatelist

Gerald James Ellott MNZM (1926 - 6 December 2024) was a New Zealand architect and philatelist who signed the Roll of Distinguished Philatelists in 1988. He was a past president of the Royal Philatelic Society of New Zealand, and a member of the Royal Institute of British Architects.

In the 2008 Queen's Birthday Honours, Ellott was appointed a Member of the New Zealand Order of Merit, for services to philately. Ellott has been awarded the Fédération Internationale de Philatélie Research Medal.

== Publications ==
- The Michael Sullivan Correspondence 1874 & 1882 to 1885. Forces Postal History Society and Society of Postal Historians, 2007.
