= Ngapare Hopa =

Māori academic of Waikato Tainui (1935–2024)

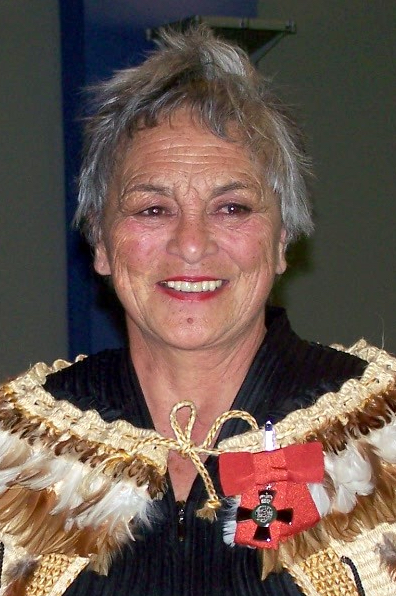
Hopa in 2008

Ngapare Kaihina Hopa MNZM (1935–30 April 2024) was a Māori academic of Waikato Tainui descent.

== Early life and education ==
Hopa attended Gordonton School in Gordonton. Later she moved to Auckland to attend Queen Victoria School and Epsom Girls’ Grammar.

Hopa later became the first Māori woman to complete a D.Phil degree from the University of Oxford.

== Academic career ==
Hopa participated as a researcher at the University of Waikato in completing the research that informed the Waikato Raupatu claim.

Hopa headed the Māori Studies department at the University of Auckland.

== Service ==
Beginning in 1989, while she was a senior research fellow at Waikato, Hopa became a member of the Waitangi Tribunal. She retired from the tribunal in 1993.

== Death ==
Hopa died on 30 April 2024 at the age of 88.

== Awards and honours ==
In the 2008 Queen's Birthday Honours, Hopa was appointed a Member of the New Zealand Order of Merit, for services to Māori.

In 2011 Hopa was recognised for her contribution to Māori arts by Creative New Zealand, receiving its Te Waka Toi awards.

Hopa's collaboration with Jennifer Curnow and Jane McRae, Rere Atu, Taku Manu! Discovering History Language & Politics in the Maori-Language Newspapers was included as part of the Te Takarangi Significant Maori non-fiction publications in 2017. The list is a collaboration between Nga Pae o Te Maramatanga and The Royal Society of New Zealand to celebrate Maori thinkers, writers, and authors since the foundation of the Royal Society. In 2017, Hopa was also selected as one of the Royal Society Te Apārangi's "150 women in 150 words", celebrating women's contributions to knowledge in New Zealand.

== Bibliography ==
- Curnow, J., N. K. Hopa and J. McRae (Eds). (2002). Rere Atu, Taku Manu! Discovering History, Language & Politics in the Maori-Language Newspapers. Auckland: Auckland University Press. ISBN 978-1-86940-279-2.
