= Richard Beasley (physician) =

New Zealand medical researcher

Richard Beasley CNZM
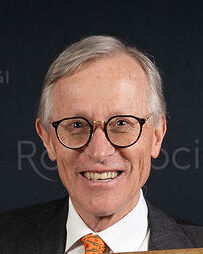
- Beasley in 2024
- Born: Charles Richard William Beasley
- Education: University of Otago
- Scientific career
- Fields: Asthma research
- Workplaces: Medical Research Institute of New Zealand; Victoria University of Wellington; University of Otago; University of Southampton

Charles Richard William Beasley CNZM is a New Zealand academic physician, the founder and Director of the Medical Research Institute of New Zealand, and as of 2019 is a full professor at the Victoria University of Wellington.

== Academic career ==
After studying medicine at the University of Otago, Beasley rose to full professor at Victoria University of Wellington, with connections to Wellington Hospital and the universities of Otago and University of Southampton.

Beasley has received multiple grants from the Health Research Council of New Zealand.

== Awards and honours ==
In the 2008 Queen's Birthday Honours, Beasley was appointed a Companion of the New Zealand Order of Merit, for services to medical research, in particular asthma. He was elected a Fellow of the Royal Society of New Zealand in 2015. In 2019, he was awarded the Health Research Council of New Zealand's Beaven Medal. In 2024 he was awarded the Rutherford Medal for "revolutionising the treatment of asthma worldwide".

== Selected works ==
- Masoli, Matthew, Denise Fabian, Shaun Holt, Richard Beasley, and Global Initiative for Asthma (GINA) Program. "The global burden of asthma: executive summary of the GINA Dissemination Committee report." Allergy 59, no. 5 (2004): 469–478.
- Asher, M. I., Ulrich Keil, H. R. Anderson, R. Beasley, J. Crane, Fernando Martinez, E. A. Mitchell, N. Pearce, B. Sibbald, and A. W. Stewart. "International Study of Asthma and Allergies in Childhood (ISAAC): rationale and methods." European respiratory journal 8, no. 3 (1995): 483–491.
- Beasley, Richard, William R. Roche, J. Alan Roberts, and Stephen T. Holgate. "Cellular events in the bronchi in mild asthma and after bronchial provocation." American Review of Respiratory Disease 139, no. 3 (1989): 806–817.
- Roche, William R., Julie H. Williams, Richard Beasley, and Stephen T. Holgate. "Subepithelial fibrosis in the bronchi of asthmatics." The Lancet 333, no. 8637 (1989): 520–524.
