= Alison Mercer =

New Zealand zoologist

Alison Mercer ONZM
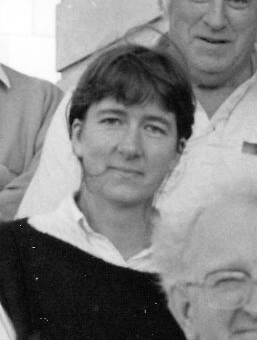
- Mercer in 1987
- Born: 1954 (age 71–72)
- Education: University of Otago
- Scientific career
- Fields: Zoology
- Workplaces: University of Otago
- Thesis: Visceral innervation in molluscs. (1979)

Alison Ruth Mercer ONZM (born 1954) is a New Zealand zoologist based at the University of Otago, with a particular interest in the brain physiology of bees. She was elected a member of the National Academy of Sciences in 2022.

== Education ==
Mercer received her PhD in zoology in 1979 from the University of Otago. Her thesis Visceral innervation in molluscs was concerned with molluscs.

== Academic career ==
She has been an emeritus professor at the University of Otago since 2018. Her research interests span from understanding the brain and behaviour of honey bees, development genetics, as well as learning and memory.

She has repeatedly made headlines in the popular press with her studies of the effects of chemicals on bees. She was nicknamed the "Queen of all pheromones" by Otago Daily Times for her work in discovering that exposing a young bee to the pheromone of a queen bee actually alters the composition of the young bee's brain. She has also published on the varroa mite a problematic parasite of honeybees.

== Awards and honours ==
In the 2008 Queen's Birthday Honours, Mercer was appointed an Officer of the New Zealand Order of Merit, for services to science.

In 2022, Mercer was elected as a member of the National Academy of Sciences.

== Selected works ==
- Fanny Mondet; Joachim R de Miranda; Andre Kretzschmar; Yves Le Conte; Alison R. Mercer (21 August 2014). "On the front line: quantitative virus dynamics in honeybee (Apis mellifera L.) colonies along a new expansion front of the parasite Varroa destructor". PLOS Pathogens. 10 (8) e1004323. doi:10.1371/JOURNAL.PPAT.1004323. ISSN 1553-7366. PMC 4140857. PMID 25144447.
- A.R. Mercer; R. Menzel (1982). "The effects of biogenic amines on conditioned and unconditioned responses to olfactory stimuli in the honeybeeApis mellifera". Journal of Comparative Physiology A. 145 (3): 363–368. doi:10.1007/BF00619340. ISSN 0340-7594.
- Daniel Flanagan; Alison R. Mercer (January 1989). "An atlas and 3-D reconstruction of the antennal lobes in the worker honey bee, Apis mellifera L. (Hymenoptera: Apidae)". Arthropod Structure & Development. 18 (2–3): 145–159. doi:10.1016/0020-7322(89)90023-8. ISSN 1467-8039.
- Kyle T Beggs; Kelly A Glendining; Nicola M Marechal; Vanina Vergoz; Ikumi Nakamura; Keith N Slessor; Alison R Mercer (7 February 2007). "Queen pheromone modulates brain dopamine function in worker honey bees". Proceedings of the National Academy of Sciences of the United States of America. 104 (7): 2460–2464. Bibcode:2007PNAS..104.2460B. doi:10.1073/PNAS.0608224104. ISSN 0027-8424. PMC 1892986. PMID 17287354.
