= Kiri Nathan =

New Zealand Māori fashion designer

Kiri Nathan MNZM
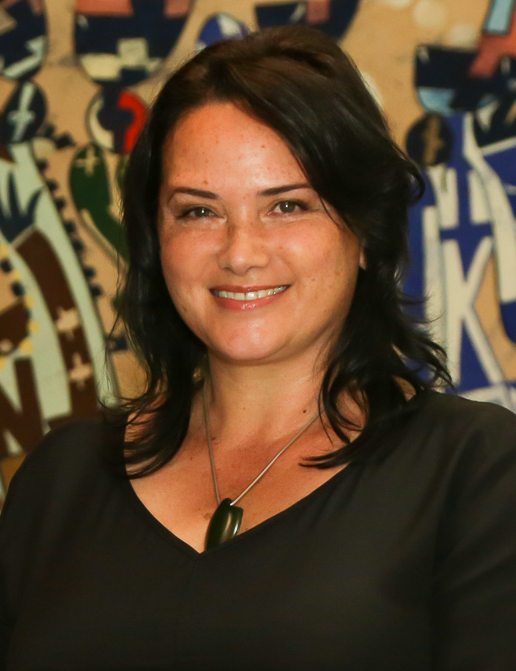
- Nathan in 2020
- Born: 1972 (age 53–54); New Zealand
- Occupation: Fashion designer
- Spouse: Jason Te Ahu Renata Nathan
- Children: 5
- Website: www.kirinathan.com

Kiri Marie Nathan MNZM (born 1972) is a New Zealand Māori fashion designer based in Auckland. She is co-founder of the fashion brand Kiri Nathan, was the first Māori designer to open New Zealand Fashion Week, and was appointed a Member of the New Zealand Order of Merit for services to Māori and the fashion industry.

== Early life ==
Nathan was born in New Zealand in 1972. Her iwi are Ngāpuhi, Ngāti Hine, Ngāti Hauā, Ngāti Maru and Ngāti Paoa. She spent her early childhood living and going to school between Scotland and New Zealand. At about age 10, her family settled in Glen Innes, Auckland. When her parents divorced, she lived with her grandmother, seamstress Inez Fullerton, in St Heliers, who taught her how to sew. Nathan's grandmother, and mother, Rozelle Fullerton, both made their own clothes.

Nathan was introduced to the fashion industry by designer Kim Fraser who was her mentor after high school, and tutor when Nathan did her three-year diploma in visual arts at the Manukau Institute of Technology, majoring in fashion. At age 18, Nathan became a single mother while she continued to study. Her tutors failed a black silk dress she designed that incorporated Māori design in woven braid trims. Nathan entered the design in the New Zealand Creative Youth Awards and won the Womenswear section, as well as the Overall Supreme Award.

After graduating, Nathan learned traditional and contemporary Māori weaving and became a flight attendant and then an in-flight manager for Ansett and Air New Zealand for 14 years. She met her husband Jason Te Ahu Renata Nathan (Ngāpuhi and Ngāti Whātua) and his child in 1998. They married and had three more children. While working at Air New Zealand, Nathan entered various fashion competitions including the New Zealand Wearable Art Awards. In 2008, she won the Supreme Award at Style Pasifika. Winning the major prize, she and her husband had the confidence to start their own label.

== Work ==
Nathan started her Kiri Nathan high-end fashion label in 2010, and she and her husband launched their first collections in 2012.

Nathan's distinctive garments, jewellery, and pounamu designed by husband Jason Nathan, bring together Māori culture, tradition, and contemporary designs. Nathan uses traditional raranga (weaving) techniques to create kākahu (handwoven garments and cloaks) and applications to garments. Each year she creates seven ongoing trans-seasonal collections based on wahanga o te ao Māori (components of Māori life). Her clothes acknowledge Māori whakapapa (genealogy), use sustainable materials and are ethically sourced and manufactured. Kiri Nathan pieces have been worn by Barack and Michelle Obama, the Duchess of Sussex, Beyoncé, Demi Lovato, Ed Sheeran and Mariah Carey and owned by Bruce Springsteen and Will.i.am.

In 2017, Nathan founded the Kāhui Collective, a community to support emerging Māori and indigenous fashion designers in their businesses and creative endeavours. The Kāhui Collective is one part of the ecosystem Nathan is building, called KAURI, designed to be the first commercial Māori fashion industry. From 2017 to 2022, Nathan led several trade visits to China to support groups of Māori fashion designers.

In 2020, Nathan dressed Jojo Rabbit producer Chelsea Winstanley in a handwoven gown for the Oscars red carpet when she was the first indigenous producer nominated for best picture.

In 2022, Nathan moved her business from her small Auckland home and studio, into her showroom, creative workshop and operations hub called Te Āhuru Mōwai, meaning shelter or safe haven, in Glen Innes. The working space is where Nathan makes her clothing and woven kākahu, and it is also a community hub for future of Aotearoa fashion designers to be mentored. In 2023, the Kahui Collective sold its designs at a pop-up store at Te Ahuru Mōwai.

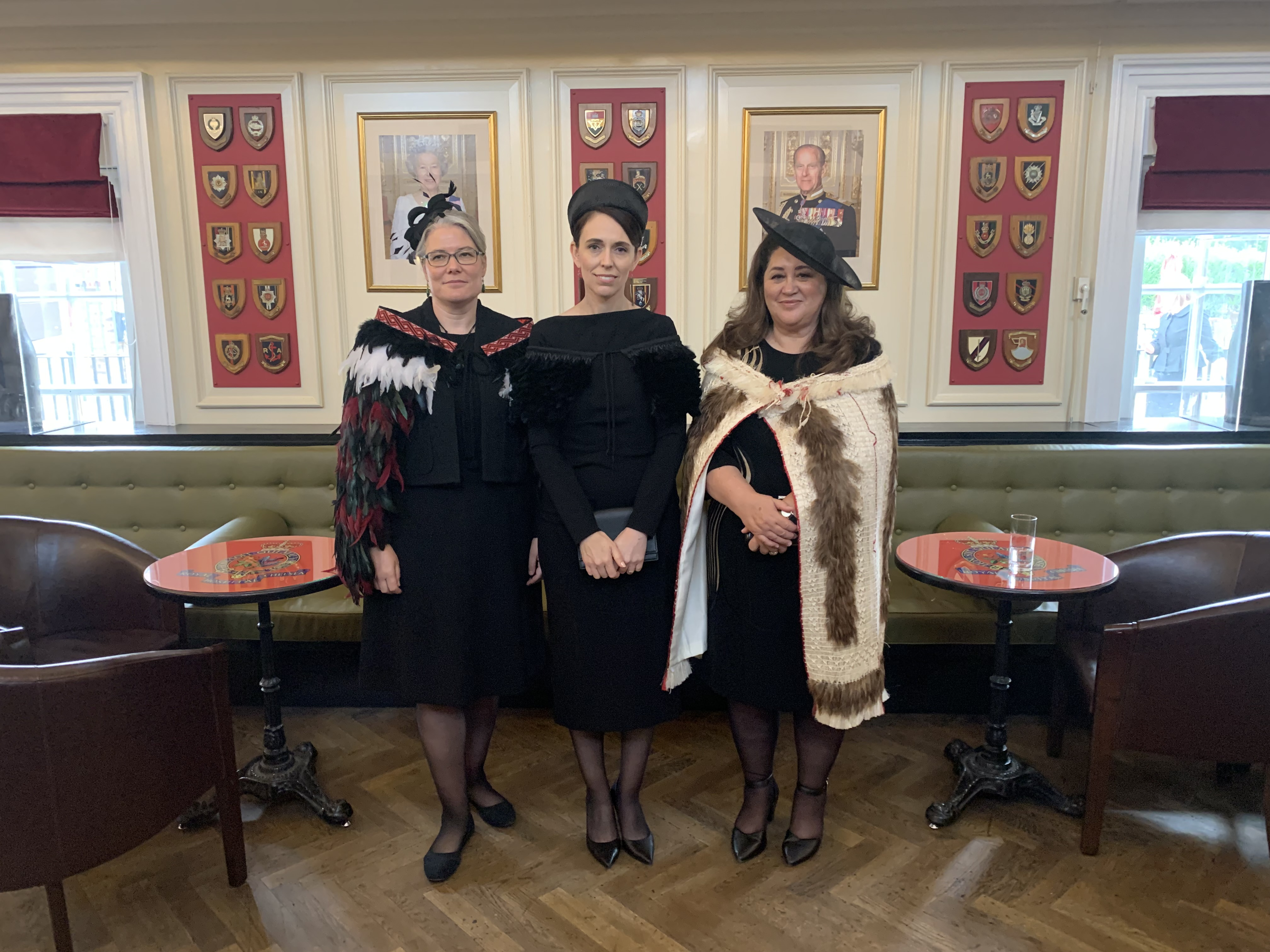
Prime Minister Jacinda Ardern (centre) wearing a Kiri Nathan kākahu, before the state funeral of Elizabeth II in London on 19 September 2022

In 2022, Prime Minister of New Zealand, Jacinda Ardern, wore a kākahu to show her support for Māori at the funeral of Queen Elizabeth II.

In 2023 Nathan was the first Māori designer to open New Zealand Fashion Week in its 22-year history, with a spectacular runway show telling the story of the evolution of Māori garments and culture. Instead of creating one collection, as is usual, Nathan created six. Instead of photographing 30 garments for their lookbook, they shot 130. Te Pāti Māori (Māori Party) co-leader Rawiri Waititi MP, modelled a pounamu tie on the runway, referring to him being dismissed from parliament for not wearing a western tie. Vogue Australia described the milestone show as “the changing of the guard” in New Zealand fashion.

In addition to New Zealand Fashion Week, Nathan has shown at Guangzhou Fashion Week China, Fiji Fashion Week and Kiri Nathan was the first New Zealand label to be selected for the London Fashion Week international showcase by the British Council and the British Fashion Council. Nathan has won numerous fashion competitions and Kiri Nathan was the first New Zealand fashion label to work with Walt Disney Pictures for the red carpet of Moana. Handwoven Kiri Nathan kākahu are in the Walt Disney museum, the Auckland Museum and will be used to cloak women in all future New Zealand Monarchy dame investiture ceremonies. Te Papa Tongarewa, the Museum of New Zealand, has 13 Kiri Nathan pieces in its New Zealand National Collection.

In December 2024, Nathan opened her store in the Britomart shopping precinct in central Auckland called Kiri Nathan. All pieces in the store are 100% made in Aotearoa / New Zealand.

Nathan serves on the board of the WOW World of Wearable Arts, the advisory board for New Zealand Fashion Week, the New Zealand China Council board, the New Zealand Mindful Fashion board, the advisory board for Super Diverse Woman and is a founding board member of the I have a Dream charitable trust that helps disadvantaged children achieve academic success. She is a founding member of Wāhine Toa, identifying and mentoring leadership in young Māori women.

== Recognition ==
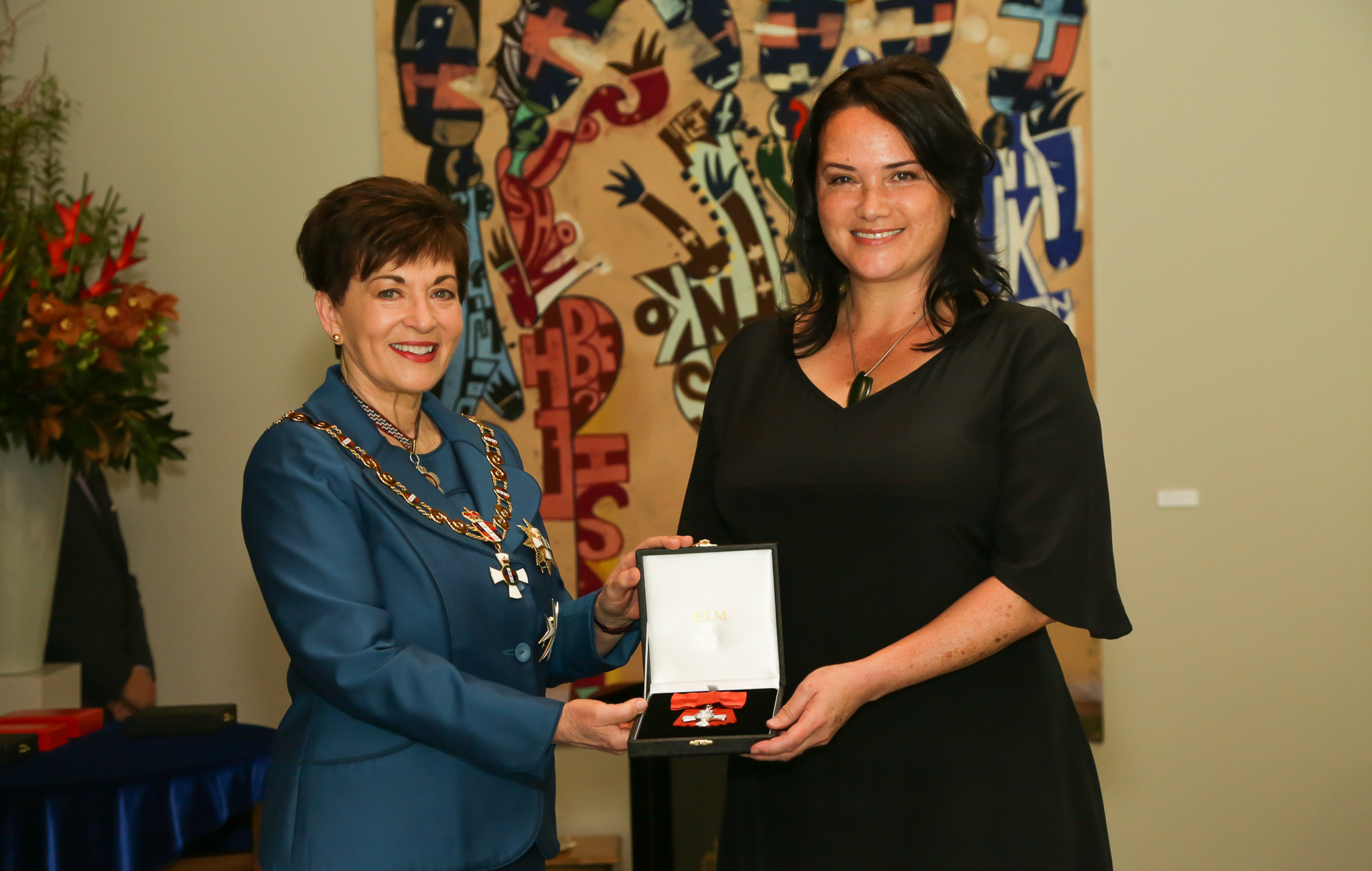
Nathan (right), after her investiture as a Member of the New Zealand Order of Merit by the governor-general, Dame Patsy Reddy, at Government House, Auckland, on 24 September 2020

In 2019, Nathan was named the MWDI (Māori Women's Development Incorporated) Māori Business Woman of the Year, and also received a Blake Leader award the same year.

In the 2020 Queen's Birthday Honours, Nathan was appointed a Member of the New Zealand Order of Merit, for services to Māori and the fashion industry. The same year, she was the first Māori finalist for SheEO NZ.

In 2021, Nathan was inducted into the New Zealand Hall of Fame for Women Entrepreneurs.

In 2024, Nathan was one of three finalists for New Zealander of the Year in the New Zealander of the Year Awards. The same year she was recognised for her 'Contribution to Māori Fashion' in the FQ Fashion Awards.

== Personal life ==
Nathan lives in Mount Wellington, Auckland with her husband and business partner, Jason Te Ahu Renata Nathan, who is the master carver behind the Kiri Nathan brand's notable pounamu designs. They have five children and four grandchildren.

In 2021, Nathan completed an intensive 36-week full-immersion te reo Māori language programme.

== See also ==
- List of New Zealand designers and artisans
