= Margi Robertson =

New Zealand fashion designer

Margi Robertson ONZM
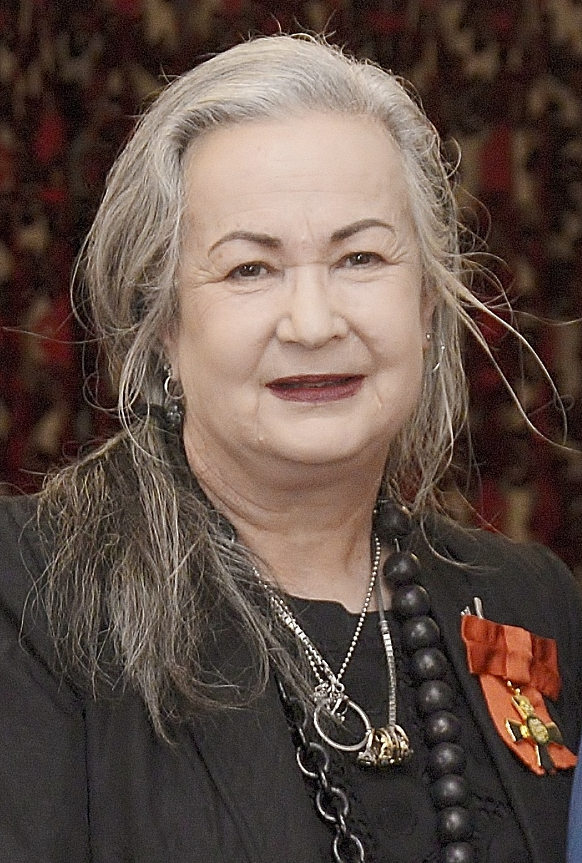
- Robertson in 2018
- Born: Margarita Anna Gladiadis; 1953 (age 72–73); Clyde, New Zealand
- Known for: Fashion designer
- Honours: Officer of the New Zealand Order of Merit

Margarita Anna Robertson ONZM (née Gladiadis, born 1953) is a New Zealand fashion designer and the founder and creative director of the New Zealand fashion line NOM*d. In the 2018 New Year Honours, she was appointed an Officer of the New Zealand Order of Merit, for services to the fashion industry. She is credited with helping define what is known as "the New Zealand Look." In the words of the New Zealand Fashion Museum, "Margarita Robertson’s status as a national designer of significant cultural importance is recognised in public collections and by her inclusion in recent exhibitions, biographies and histories on New Zealand fashion." In 2011, Robertson's creations were featured in a single-artist exhibition held at the Eastern Southland Gallery, Gore, July 28–2 September.

== Background ==
Robertson was born in Clyde in 1953 and grew up in Dunedin. Her sister is Elisabeth Findlay, founder of Zambesi, another New Zealand fashion line. She opened her first boutique in Dunedin in 1975, establishing her current boutique Plume in 1978, and a second Plume in Christchurch in 1992. Her label NOM*d, founded in 1986, was shown at the inaugural New Zealand Fashion Week in 2001 and is regularly included as part of iD Dunedin Fashion Week.

== Career ==
Within New Zealand, Robertson is associated with Dunedin and its cultural heritage as the location of the alternative music movement known as Dunedin sound. The bohemian counter-culture dimension of the city has left an indelible mark on her fashion sense. Her label appeals to a broad cross-section of its inhabitants – from those who were part of that movement to young aspiring creatives, writers, artists, musicians and others, including the many students who attend University of Otago, which is located in this city. Her designs are also described as "enjoying a flourishing trade in Europe, the United States and Asia." In 2015, i-D magazine's website devoted an editorial spread to "Dunedin's Black Brigade" that highlighted Robertson and a series of young local inhabitants.
