= Peter Posa =

New Zealand guitarist (1941–2019)

Peter Posa MNZM
- Posa in the 1960s

Background information
- Born: Peter Paul Posa; 8 August 1941; West Auckland, New Zealand
- Died: 3 February 2019 (aged 77) Hamilton, New Zealand
- Occupation: Entertainer
- Years active: 1961–2019

Peter Paul Posa MNZM (8 August 1941 – 3 February 2019) was a New Zealand guitarist most famous for his instrumental "The White Rabbit", which was released in 1963. The song is a guitar instrumental that sold 100,000 copies.

== Career ==
Posa was born in West Auckland, New Zealand, on 8 August 1941 to Paul and Millie Posa, who had migrated from Croatia. Posa started learning the ukulele at the age of seven and formed his first band when he was 18 years old.

In the 2008 Queen's Birthday Honours, Posa was appointed a Member of the New Zealand Order of Merit, for services to entertainment. Posa died at Waikato Hospital on 3 February 2019 at the age of 77.

In 2012, White Rabbit The Very Best of Peter Posa went to the top of the New Zealand album charts, spending six weeks at the number-one spot.

== Discography ==
=== Studio albums ===
List of studio albums
Title	Details
String Along With Peter	Released: 1961; Label: Zodiac (ZLP 1012); Format: LP
Tiki Tunes	Released: 1963; Label: Viking Records (VP120); Format: LP
The White Rabbit and Other Tunes for Playboys	Released: 1963; Label: Viking Records (VP107); Format: LP
Tiki Tunes	Released: 1963; Label: Viking Records (VP120); Format: LP
Mad Hatter	Released: 1964; Label: Viking Records (VP125); Format: LP
The Hitch-Hiker (with His Golden Guitar)	Released: 1964; Label: Viking Records (VP131); Format: LP
Flying High (with His Golden Guitar)	Released: 1964; Label: Viking Records (VP136); Format: LP
The Sound Of Peter Posa (with His Golden Guitar)	Released: 1965; Label: Viking Records (VP147); Format: LP
Beat Guitar (with His Golden Guitar)	Released: 1965; Label: Viking Records (VP159); Format: LP
This Is Peter Posa	Released: 1965; Label: Viking Records (VP167); Format: LP
The Posa Scottish & Irish Album (with The Thistlemen)	Released: 1965; Label: Viking Records (VP185); Format: LP
Guitar Sounds	Released: 1965; Label: Viking Records (VP192); Format: LP
My Kind of Pickin	Released: 1966; Label: Viking Records (VP215); Format: LP
Internationally Yours	Released: 1967; Label: Zodiac (ZLP 1030); Format: LP
Guitar Pops	Released: 1970; Label: Salem (XPS 5064); Format: LP
South Seas Guitars (with Bill Wolfgramme and His Islanders and Trevor Edmondson)	Released: 1970; Label: Salem (XPS 5064); Format: LP

=== Live albums ===
List of live albums
Title	Details
On Stage with Lou & Simon & Peter Posa (with Lou & Simon)	Released: 1964; Label: Viking Records (Viking VP138); Format: LP

=== Extended plays ===
List of extended plays
Title	Details
Peter Posa Hits (with His Golden Guitar)	Released: 1963; Label: Viking Records (VE 134); Format: LP
More Peter Posa Hits (with His Golden Guitar)	Released: 1964; Label: Viking Records (VE 136); Format: LP
Posa Plays Guitar Boogie (with His Golden Guitar)	Released: 1964; Label: Viking Records (VE 152); Format: LP
Posa Plays Westerns (with His Golden Guitar)	Released: 1964; Label: Viking Records (VE 153); Format: LP
Peter Posa Goes Gonk	Released: 1965; Label: Viking Records (VE 165); Format: LP
Maori Melodies On Guitar	Released: 1965; Label: Viking Records (VE 168); Format: LP
Do You Want to Dance?	Released: 1965; Label: Viking Records (VE 172); Format: LP
Gizmo	Released: 1965; Label: Viking Records (VE 203); Format: LP
Positively Posa	Released: 1965; Label: Viking Records (VE 217); Format: LP

=== Charting compilation albums ===
List of charting compilation albums, with New Zealand chart positions
Title	Album details	Peak chart positions
Title	Album details	NZ
The Best of Peter Posa	Released: 1997; Label: BMG New Zealand (74321 508642); Format: CD	37
My Pick	Released: November 2003; Label: BMG New Zealand (82876577902); Format: 2x CD	44
White Rabbit: The Very Best Of	Released: July 2012; Label: Sony Music (88725430342); Format: CD, DD	1
Golden Guitar: The Peter Posa Anthology	Released: 2013; Label: Sony Music; Format: CD, DD	9
Plays The Hits of the British Invasion	Released: June 2016; Label: Sony Music (88985337532); Format: CD, DD	10

== Awards ==
In the 2008 Queen's Birthday Honours, Posa was appointed a Member of the New Zealand Order of Merit, for services to entertainment.

=== Aotearoa Music Awards ===
The Aotearoa Music Awards (previously known as New Zealand Music Awards (NZMA)) are an annual awards night celebrating excellence in New Zealand music and have been presented annually since 1965.

Year	Nominee / work	Award	Result	Ref.
2004	My Pick	Worship of the Year	Nominated	
2013	White Rabbit: The Very Best of	Highest Selling Album the Year	Won	
2020	Peter Posa	New Zealand Music Hall of Fame	inductee	
