= 2008 New Zealand bravery awards =

The 2008 New Zealand bravery awards were announced via a special honours list on 3 May 2008, and recognised five people for acts of bravery between 2004 and 2006. In March 2023, two further awards, to police officers Eric Tibbott and Allister Rose, previously not made public for security reasons relating to the New Zealand Police, were published.

== New Zealand Bravery Star (NZBS) ==
- Taufui Aevalu Paea – of Glenfield.

On the morning of 6 December 2004 in Glenfield, Auckland, Mr Paea’s neighbour was brutally murdered by her estranged partner, who had been on the run from the Police for a number of weeks. The offender arrived at the woman’s home while she was getting out of her car and helping her two year old daughter out of a car seat. The offender approached, and after talking to the woman for a short time, their conversation turned into a heated argument. The offender began to assault the woman who managed to break free. The offender caught up with her and began stabbing her in the back and shoulders. The victim managed to struggle free again and this time ran to the front door of Mr Paea’s house. The offender caught up to the victim at Mr Paea’s front door and both of them fell through it into the hallway. Mr Paea, aged 67, who was in the kitchen at the time, rushed into the hallway to find the offender straddling the victim and stabbing her in the neck, shoulders, and stomach. He called out to the offender to “stop”, but was ignored. Mr Paea then tackled the offender, wrapping his arms around him and trying to pull him off the victim. The offender pushed Mr Paea away causing him to fall onto the victim. As he tried to stand up, the offender stabbed him in the left cheek causing a deep puncture wound that later required five stitches and a brief period of hospitalisation. Mr Paea, wounded and in shock, managed to escape from the offender’s attentions, left the house, alerted another neighbour and asked them to call the Police. He then returned to his home to save his wife and grandchildren, who were in the lounge. His wife managed to pass the two children out of the window and he took them to a place of safety before returning to his home yet again to get his wife and see if he could assist the victim. As he approached the house he met the offender, who was leaving carrying two knives. Seeing Mr Paea coming towards him, the offender jumped over a fence, ran through a neighbouring property to his car and drove away. Mr Paea entered his home to find his wife safe, but the other woman had since died, having received some thirty stab wounds. Although he was unsuccessful in saving the life of the victim, Mr Paea showed exceptional bravery in attempting to do so by tackling the armed offender at considerable risk to his own life. He also displayed bravery, presence of mind and determination in alerting a neighbour to the situation and by returning to his home to ensure the safety of his wife and grandchildren and to see if he could provide any further assistance to the victim.

- Eric Ivan John Tibbott – sergeant, New Zealand Police.
- Allister Graham Rose – constable, New Zealand Police.

== New Zealand Bravery Decoration (NZBD) ==
- Robert Bruce Gibson – constable, New Zealand Police.
- Karl Hugh Pennington – constable, New Zealand Police.

On 5 June 2005 at 9.20 am, a man drove into the St Lukes shopping centre carpark in Auckland after being pursued by Police for driving dangerously through inner-city Auckland. Once in the carpark the offender, who was armed with a cut-down AK47 style assault rifle, tried unsuccessfully to hijack a car occupied by a mother and her six year old daughter. The offender then tried to hijack a second car, but was distracted by the arrival of a Police car driven by Constable Pennington and Constable Gibson. Seeing the Police officers arrive, the offender approached the Police car and pointed the rifle at Constable Pennington. He pulled the trigger, but the gun failed to fire as it had not been properly cocked. Undeterred, the offender continued to approach the car still aiming the rifle at Constable Pennington. While this was happening, Constable Pennington retained his composure and hastily made a radio call to Police Control. Constable Gibson dived out of the car. The offender continued to struggle with his rifle and when he finally managed to chamber a round, he fired a shot into the roof of the carpark. Not knowing in which direction this shot had been fired, Constable Pennington also dived out of the car. Realising that both Police officers were now lying prone on the opposite side of the vehicle, the offender fired several shots through the rear passenger door of the Police car in an attempt to kill them. One of these shots passed close to Constable Gibson’s head. The offender then ran off and attempted to hijack a further two vehicles at the car park entrance. During this time, both constables moved to a position where they could observe the offender. Believing that several members of the public were in grave danger, Constable Pennington stepped out from behind cover to attract his attention. Realising the Police officers were still alive, the offender ran back into the carpark firing at them. Both constables ran up a ramp and, once they believed they were clear of the offender, they warned other members of the public who were in the vicinity to get clear of the area and then called for back up. During this time, the offender finally managed to hijack a vehicle containing a man and his elderly parents and drove off with them still in the car. During the ensuing pursuit of the hijacked vehicle, the offender fired on Police a further three times and was eventually apprehended by the Armed Offenders Squad. Throughout this incident both these unarmed Police officers displayed great bravery in confronting an armed offender who was intent on killing them. Working as a team, they made sure members of the public were warned of potential danger and managed to prevent at least two attempts by the offender to hijack vehicles in the car park. They also kept Police controllers informed throughout the incident, which facilitated the subsequent arrest of the offender by the Armed Offenders Squad.

== New Zealand Bravery Medal (NZBM) ==
- Roger William Bright – senior constable, New Zealand Police.

At 7.40am on 4 January 2006, a male resident of Great Barrier Island arrived at the residence of Senior Constable Roger Bright (one of two police members on Great Barrier Island), seeking help. The resident had found a will, suicide note, wallet, and two chequebooks belonging to his friend on his front porch and asked if Senior Constable Bright would accompany him to his friend’s house, because he feared what might have happened to him. When Senior Constable Bright and the resident arrived at the house there was a strong smell of gas emanating from the rear of the property. All the doors and windows of the house were secured and after a further search, a male body was seen lying on the floor of the bathroom along with two 60lb gas bottles, which were venting gas into the room. Senior Constable Bright, looking through the window, could not see any signs of life from the man. In an attempt to gain entry into the house without igniting the gas inside, he used a nearby machete he had found to try and lever open the bathroom window. Whilst doing so, however, he heard the man cough, and immediately ran back to the porch to retrieve a splitting axe, which he used to smash the window. When Senior Constable Bright entered the house, he was hit with a wall of gas fumes, which also filled the bathroom. He physically dragged the man, who was unconscious, solidly built, and 6 feet 4 inches in height, from the bathroom whilst almost being overcome by the gas himself. He continued to drag the man away from the bathroom and through the house, stopping half way to battle the effects of the gas. Eventually he managed to drag the man out of the house to a safer area of the property. With the help of the victim’s friend, he then moved the victim to the friend’s house. Senior Constable Bright then went to wake the doctor who lived up the road; however, he was unsuccessful and had to get the local radio operator to contact the on-call doctor before returning to the victim. Senior Constable Bright displayed quick thinking and bravery in order to save a life, when he entered, without hesitation, a life threatening situation knowing that further police and medical assistance were not immediately available.

- George Allan Stewart – senior sergeant, New Zealand Police.

Senior Sergeant Allan Stewart was deployed as part of the United Nations Integrated Mission in Timor-Leste for a six month period between October 2006 and April of 2007, where he was the Sub District Commander of the Becora area as part of the United Nations Police (UNPOL). He commanded 140 staff over one of the biggest sub districts of Dili where the Metanaro Internally Displaced Persons Refugee Camp (IDP) was based that contained 7,000 refugees. On 10 November 2006, a group led by a UN co-ordinator and six other UN employees were working at the Metanaro IDP Refugee Camp. There was festering anger and unrest amongst the camp residents over perceived delays in the provision of rice and other food stocks from the UN Non Government Organisation (NGO), and after a heated exchange over the allocation of food and water with the camp management, the UN co-ordinator and the other UN employees were taken hostage by a large group of hostile, armed male residents. When the employees tried to leave the camp by vehicle, a large crowd of young men physically threatened them with rocks and other weapons and seized the vehicle keys, telling the UN hostages that they could not leave until they (the refugees) had been given what they wanted. The hostages attempted to seek help from the nearby local Timor-Leste Defence Force (FFDTL) Military Camp and although the F-FDTL soldiers came to assist them, the soldiers were unable to resolve the dispute or convince the offenders to release the hostages. The hostages then requested UNPOL to be contacted. Senior Sergeant Allan Stewart responded to the request from his headquarters in Dili and accompanied by a fellow Portuguese officer acting as his interpreter, he began a tense negotiation with the offenders and other IDP militants. He entered the camp alone (with the interpreter) and was fully aware of the hostility the residents had towards UNPOL and that more assistance was some distance away. He was also aware that the offenders were armed with a variety of weapons and a hostile crowd had formed. After calming the tense atmosphere and checking on the status of the hostages, he began the negotiation for the release of the hostages. He sat amongst the agitators for some 20 minutes listening to their concerns whilst at the same time advising them that their actions were unacceptable and that the hostages must be released. Several times over this period, the crowd became agitated and aggressive and twice threatened to break off talks with Sergeant Allan Stewart. On both occasions, he managed to calm the offenders down and finally arranged the return of the vehicle keys so the hostages could leave while he remained to hear the resident’s grievances. No injuries resulted from this incident, but there was real potential for violence and attacks against the hostages, which was evidenced in the unrest which followed the next day. Throughout this incident, Senior Sergeant Allan Stewart displayed tact and negotiation skills, which together with his bravery and professionalism secured the release of the hostages and prevented them from further injury or even death.
