= Liz Findlay =

New Zealand fashion designer

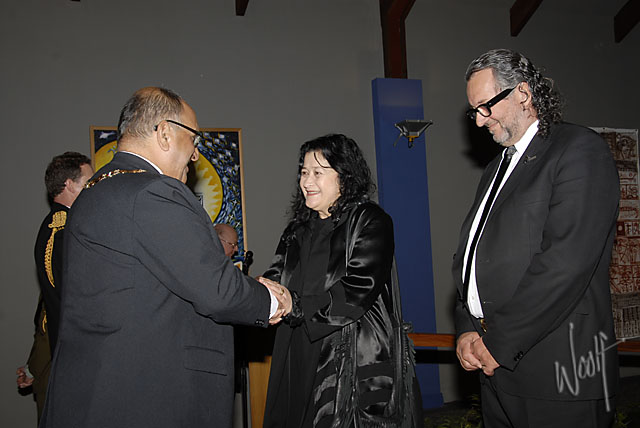
Liz and Neville Findlay being invested as Officers of the New Zealand Order of Merit by the governor-general, Anand Satyanand, in September 2008

Elisabeth Findlay ONZM is a New Zealand fashion designer. She co-founded the fashion house Zambesi with her husband, Neville Findlay, in 1979.

== Career ==
Findlay was born in Athens, Greece. In 1951 the Red Cross relocated her family to Dunedin, New Zealand. Though her mother taught her and her sisters how to sew, she never received any formal training in fashion design. At 21 she moved to Auckland and got a job working at a clothing company. Through this experience she learned how to use industrial machines, and the production behind clothes.

In 1976, encouraged by her sister, Margi Robertson, she opened Tart boutique store in Parnell Auckland. She selected labels to sell based on her own taste and included New Zealand designers such as Marilyn Sainty. She sold only a few garments in the store of her own design. A second store, Cachet, was opened in Takapuna in 1978.

In 1979, her husband left his job as a design engineer and they formed their label Zambesi. That same year, they opened their first store at 31 Lorne Street in Auckland, followed by a second store in Queen's Arcade in 1981. By 1986, these two central Auckland stores were merged to create their flagship store on Vulcan Lane. This store remained open until 2012, at which time they shifted to Britomart.

The label first gained international acclaim in 1991 when they were first invited to show at Australia Fashion week in Sydney. This was the first year the New Zealand designers were invited to show at the Fashion week.

In the 2008 Queen's Birthday Honours, both Liz and Neville Findlay were appointed Officers of the New Zealand Order of Merit, for services to business and fashion.

=== Exhibitions ===
2005, Zambesi: Edge of Darkness Auckland Museum
