= David Trubridge =

New Zealand designer

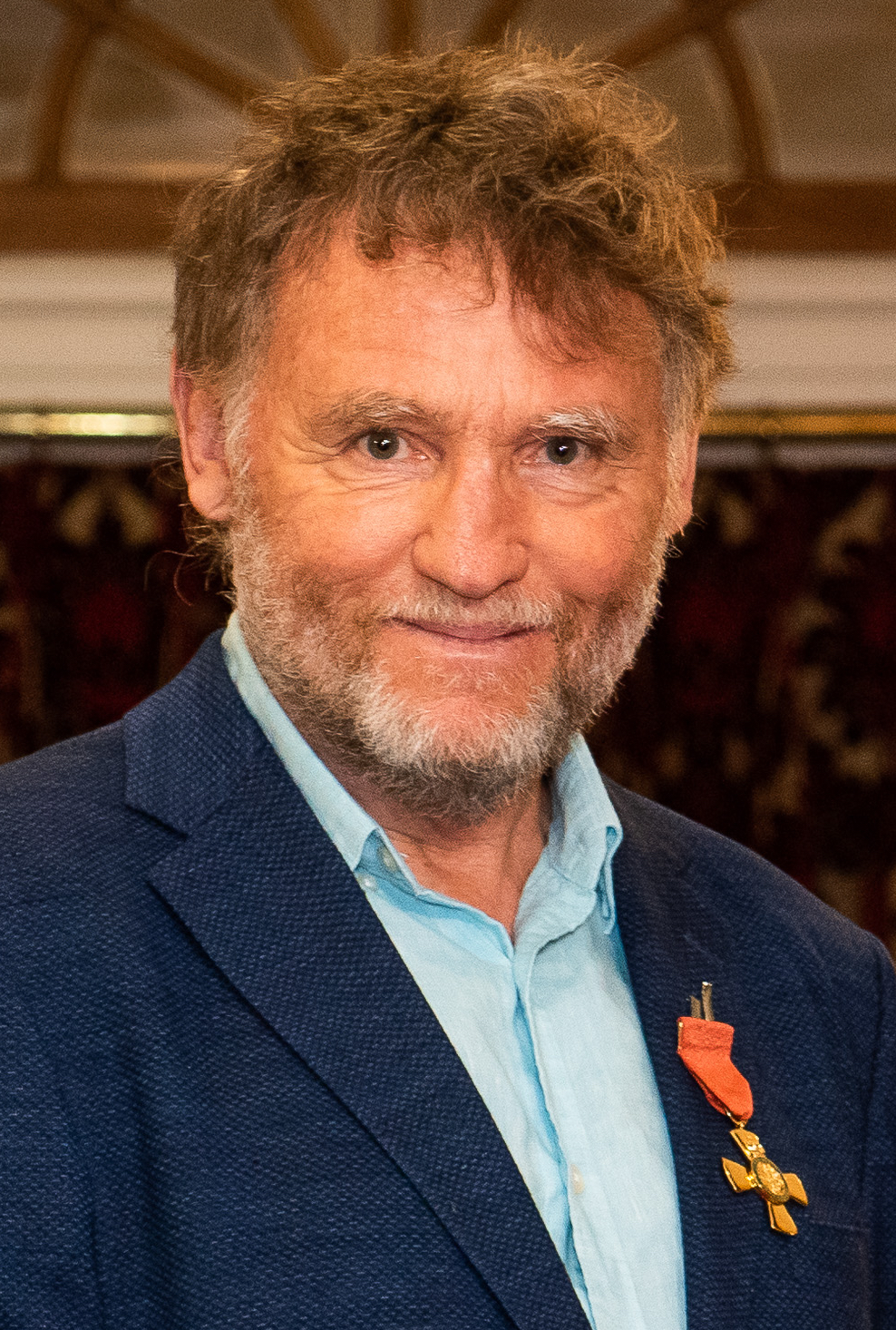
- Trubridge in 2019
- Born: 14 January 1951 (age 75); England. United Kingdom
- Citizenship: British
- Occupations: Furniture and lighting design

David Geoffrey Trubridge (born 14 January 1951) is a furniture designer based in Whakatu, New Zealand. He designs lighting and furniture, with a focus on sustainable materials.

== Early life and education ==
Trubridge graduated from Newcastle University in 1972 with a degree in Naval Architecture. He then worked as a forester in rural Northumberland for ten years, where he learned how to make furniture. His designs were shown in the UK, including at the Victoria and Albert Museum and St. Mary's Cathedral in Edinburgh.

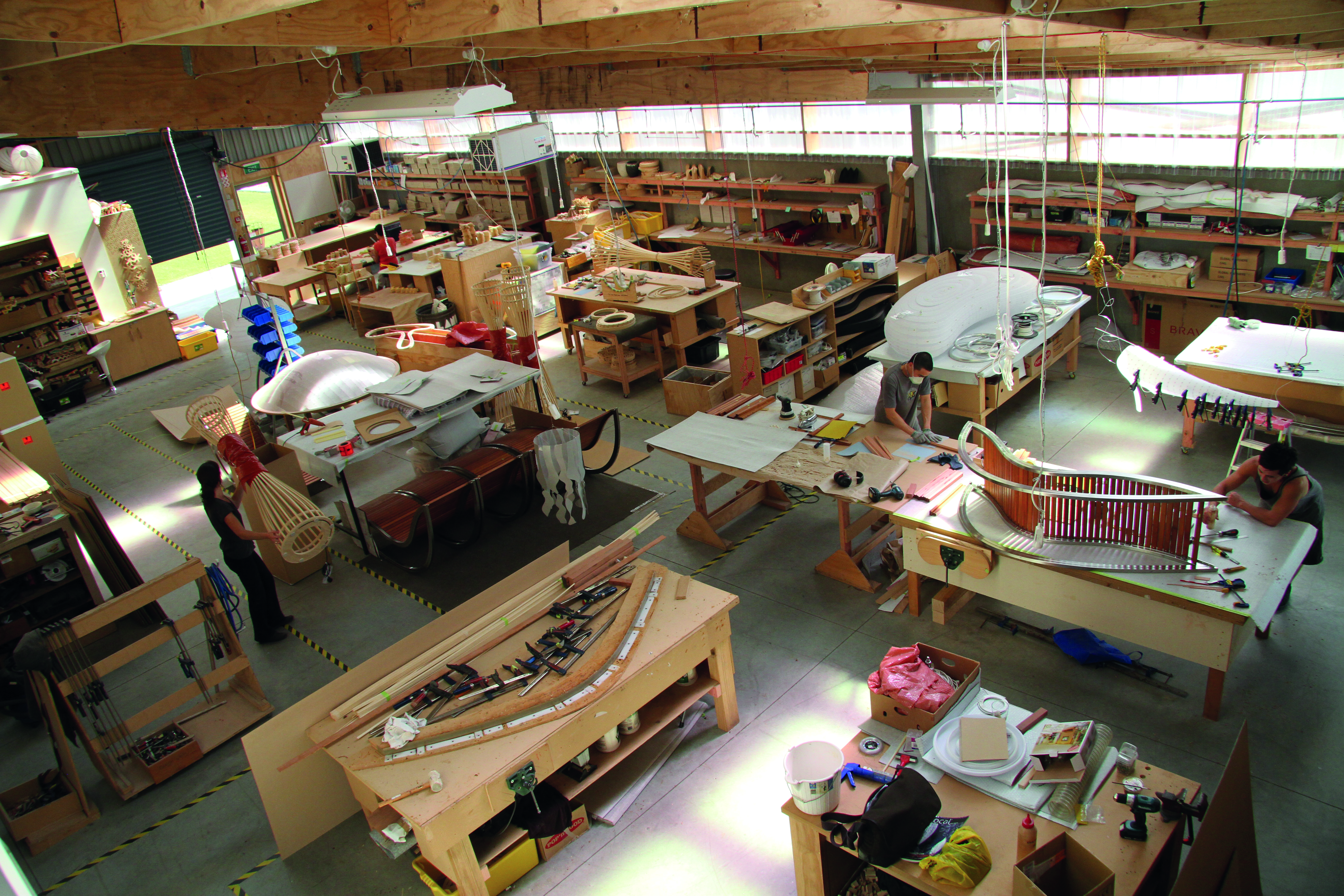
Trubridge's workshop

== Career ==
Trubridge's works have been featured in exhibitions at Dwell on Design in Los Angeles as well as Wanted Design in New York City. Since 2006, he has participated in the Milan Furniture Fair.

In 2007, in conjunction with the Natural Art Museum and the United Nations, Trubridge exhibited "On Thin Ice" at the Nobel Peace Centre. Shown in Oslo, Brussels, Monaco and Chicago, this sculptural investigation into climate change won a Green Leaf Award.

In 2008, Trubridge was listed by French magazine L'Express as one of the "Top 15 Designers in the World".

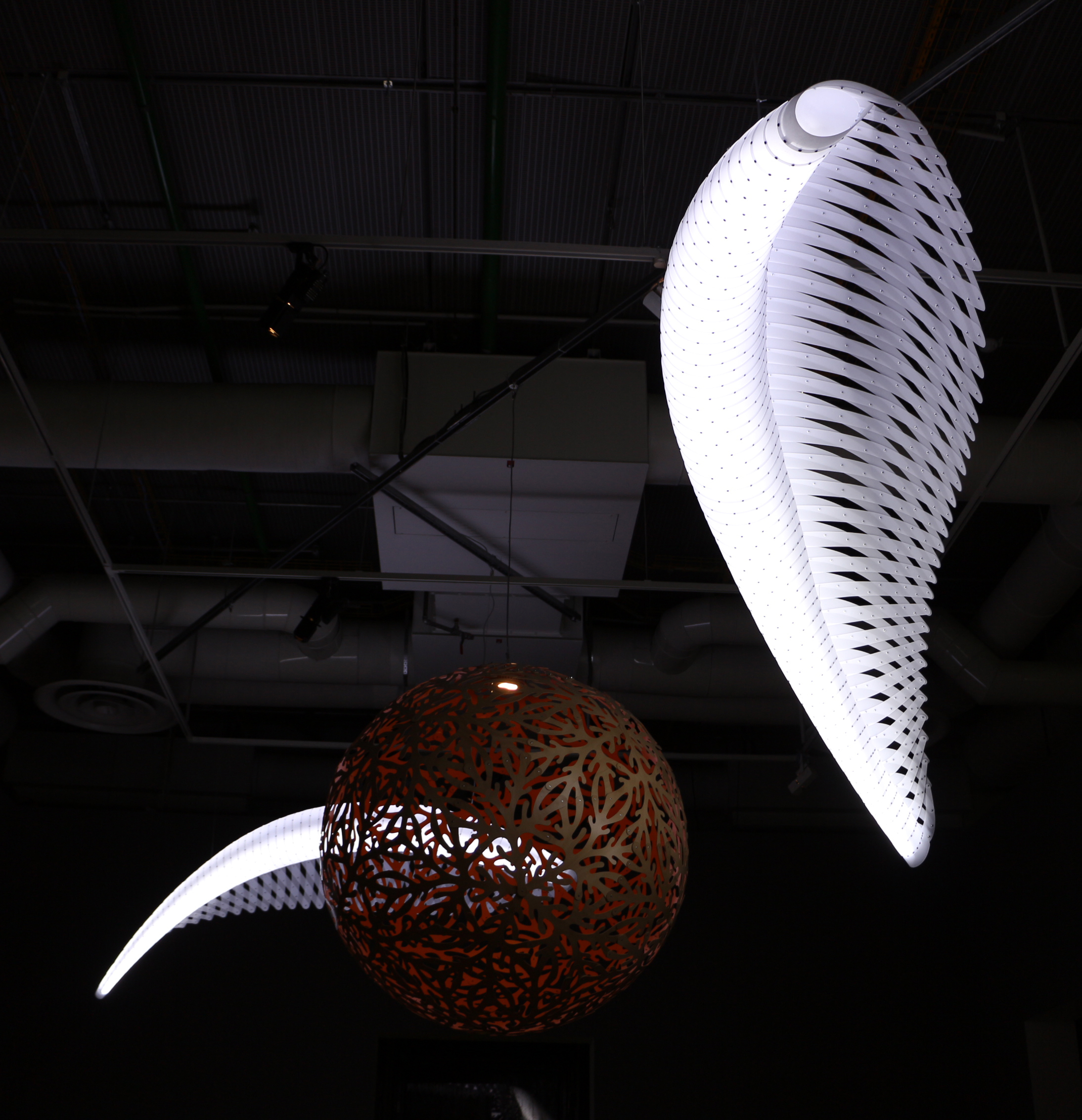
Icarus and Sola lamps, 2000s, Musée national d'art moderne, Paris

In the 2019 Queen's Birthday Honours, Trubridge was appointed an Officer of the New Zealand Order of Merit for services to design. He was also a part of the 2010 Smithsonian Cooper Hewitt Design National Design Triennial.

== Notable works ==
Martin Sidoruk, speaking for the DINZ Council, said, "David is a true advocate of New Zealand's design industry, speaking regularly overseas and mentoring young designers while at the same time achieving international success and recognition for his incredible designs."

Flora, fauna, and natural formations are frequent inspirations for Trubridge's work, which includes lighting, furniture, large-scale commissions, and sculptural pieces.

One of Trubridge's well-known designs is the Coral Light. Inspired by the designer's underwater experiences, the piece is based on the structure of a geometric polyhedron and resembles coral patterns. His collections incorporate a range of Grow lights known as the Seed System.

In 2008, Trubridge designed Body Raft for the New Zealand exhibition "Furniture in Context," a Hawke's Bay Cultural Trust initiative. It was later shown at the Dowse Art Museum. A further developed version of Body Raft was shown at the 2001 Milan Furniture Fair, and its design was purchased by the Italian company Cappellini.

Trubridge has also developed large-scale commissions for corporate clients. These include lighting for Topshop's flagship store on Oxford Street, lighting for Stella McCartney in Printemps (Paris), benches for Suncorp HQ (Brisbane) and the AMP foyer (Auckland), customized lights for Oroton (in all Australian stores), and sculptural light installations for Bombay Sapphire's pop-up shop in Auckland.

A collaborative project with Urban Arts Projects resulted in a lighting installation for the Westfield Fox Hills Shopping Centre in California. Trubridge also has work in the Minneapolis Museum (Glide), Auckland Museum (Pacific Chair) and the Powerhouse, Sydney (Sling).

In 2010, the Pompidou Centre in Paris acquired Trubridge's Icarus installation (two Wing and one Sola light) for its permanent collection.

== Awards ==
In the 2019 Queen's Birthday Honours, Trubridge was appointed an Officer of the New Zealand Order of Merit, for services to design.
