= Eastern Southland Gallery =

Art museum in Gore

Coordinates: 46.0980°S 168.9460°E

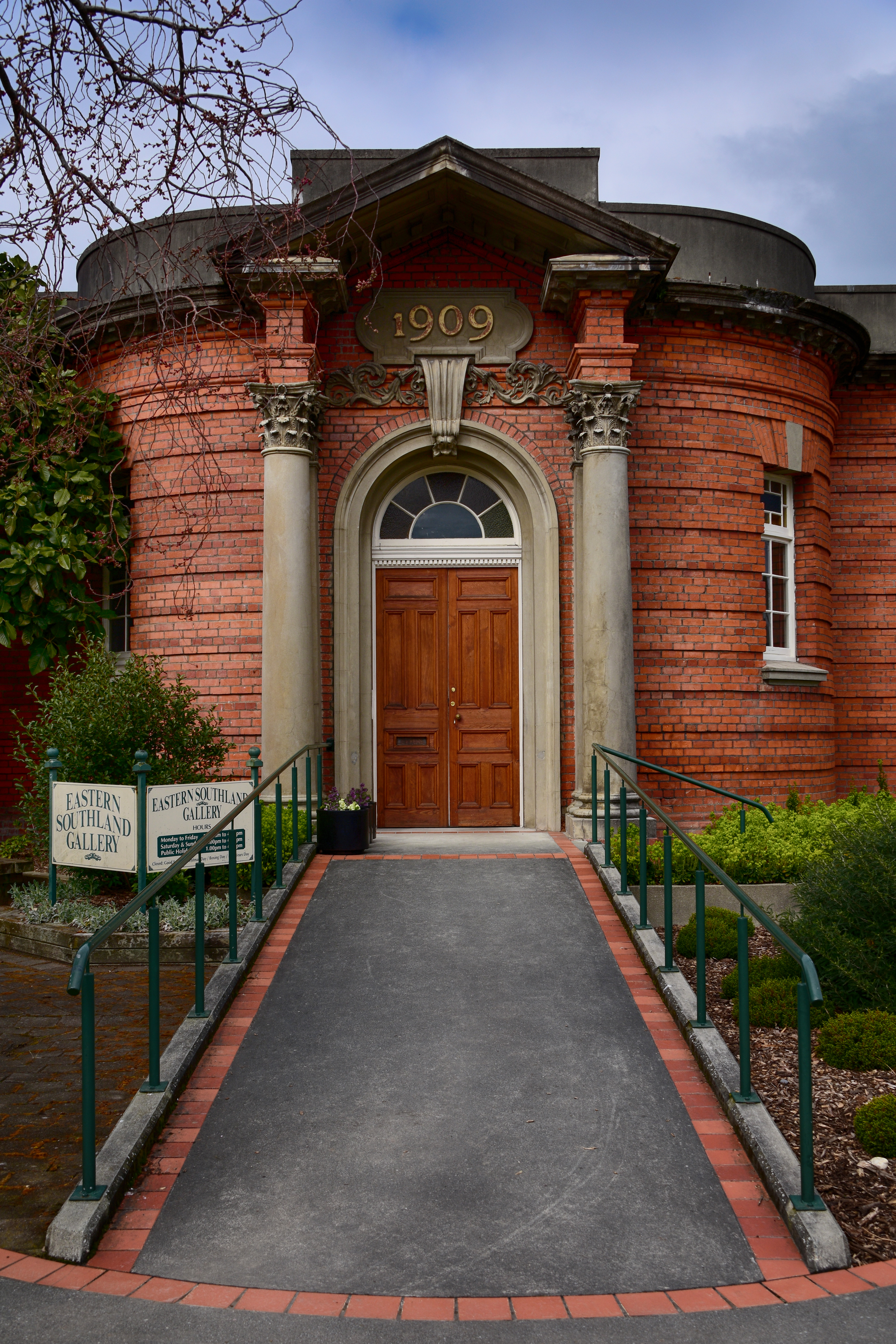
Gore's former Carnegie library, now an art gallery

The Eastern Southland Gallery is a major provincial art gallery in Gore, New Zealand. The gallery is housed in the town's former Carnegie library building, which was built in 1909. Though principally a provincial gallery, the Eastern Southland Gallery is important due to two of its major permanent exhibits, the Ralph Hotere Gallery and the John Money Collection. The gallery also hosts regular shows in two separate wings.

== History and location ==
The Eastern Southland Gallery was built in 1909 as a public library for Gore, one of eighteen Carnegie libraries that were built in New Zealand with funds from American philanthropist Andrew Carnegie. The building was extended in 2003 so that it could accommodate the John Money Collection. The gallery is located at 14 Hokonui Drive, the northern end of Gore's main street, close to the town clocktower and public library.

== John Money Collection ==
The John Money Collection is a substantial collection of artworks, most of which are either ethnological artefacts or modern art drawing on tribal art for its inspiration (including several notable works by Theo Schoon). It has been housed in a specially-built extension to the gallery since December 2003. The collection was the passion of noted sexologist John Money, who donated much of his collection to the gallery in 2003, and was built up over several decades from the 1940s on. Money had become friends with Schoon in Christchurch in the 1940s, and also with many other members of New Zealand's art elite, including Rita Angus and Douglas Lilburn.

Schoon's interest in Māori art led to an awakening in similar interests in Money, and from 1947 (when Money moved to Pittsburgh, Pennsylvania) he became a patron of Schoon and Angus and also an avid collector of tribal art, including works from Australia, Africa, and the Americas.

The collection as presented in the Eastern Southland Gallery is dominated by a series of large sculptural figures from West Africa, alongside which sit modern art from the United States and New Zealand and Aboriginal art from Australia.

== Ralph Hotere Gallery ==
The Ralph Hotere Gallery contains a significant number of works by arguably New Zealand's most prominent contemporary artist, Ralph Hotere. This series of works was created in collaboration with poet Hone Tuwhare, and comprises one of the largest and most important collections of work by both Hotere and Tuwhare.
