= Roka Ngarimu-Cameron =

New Zealand Māori weaver (1948–2025)

Roka Ngarimu-Cameron MNZM
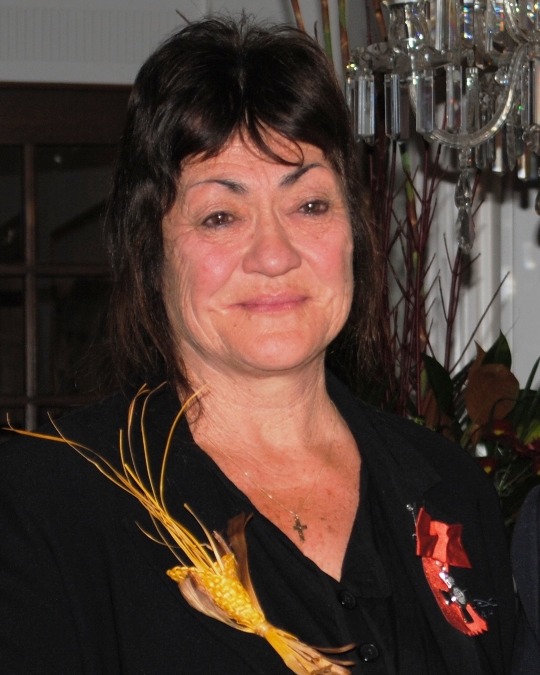
- Ngarimu-Cameron in 2011
- Born: 27 July 1948; New Zealand
- Died: 10 June 2025 (aged 76)
- Education: Otago Polytechnic
- Known for: Weaving

Roka Hurihia Ngarimu-Cameron MNZM (27 July 1948 – 10 June 2025) was a New Zealand Māori tohunga raranga (master weaver).

== Biography ==
Ngarimu-Cameron was born in Ōpōtiki, and grew up in Hāwai. In 1990, Ngarimu-Cameron established ‘Te Whānau Arohanui’, a marae and foster care centre in Waitati, Otago. The centre provides care for youth and was also a venue for Ngarimu-Cameron's weaving courses.

In 2008, Ngarimu-Cameron completed a Master of Fine Arts degree at Otago Polytechnic, supervised by Leoni Schmidt, Christine Keller, Clive Humphreys and Khyla Russell. Her dissertation studied the combination of traditional Māori weaving and loom weaving, and included a solo exhibition, Toku Haerenga/My Journey, held at the Dunedin Public Art Gallery. From 2008, Ngarimu-Cameron was a lecturer in traditional arts at the University of Otago.

In the 2011 Queen's Birthday Honours, Ngarimu-Cameron was appointed a Member of the New Zealand Order of Merit, for services to Māori.

Ngarimu-Cameron was of the Te Whānau-ā-Apanui, Te Arawa, Whakatōhea, Ngāti Awa and Ngāti Tūwharetoa iwi, and also of Irish descent. She died on 10 June 2025, at the age of 76.

== Publications ==
- Ngarimu-Cameron, R. (2010). Tōku haerenga - a transformation of Māori cloaks: Combining traditional Māori materials with western weaving techniques.
- Ngarimu-Cameron, R., Torr, J., & Pataka Porirua Museum of Arts and Cultures. (2010). Ngā kākahu: Change & exchange. Porirua [N.Z].: Pataka Museum of Arts & Cultures.
- Roka Hurihia Ngarimu-Cameron (MNZM) (2019) Weaving the Two Cultures of Aotearoa/New Zealand Together: From the Art of Making Traditional Off-Loom Garments to a Contemporary Practice of On-Loom Weaving, TEXTILE, 17:2, 158–167, DOI: 10.1080/14759756.2018.1474000
