= IUE =

IUE may refer to:

- International Ultraviolet Explorer
- Indiana University East
- Niue International Airport (IATA code)
- International Union of Electrical Workers
