= Gus Fisher (fashion) =

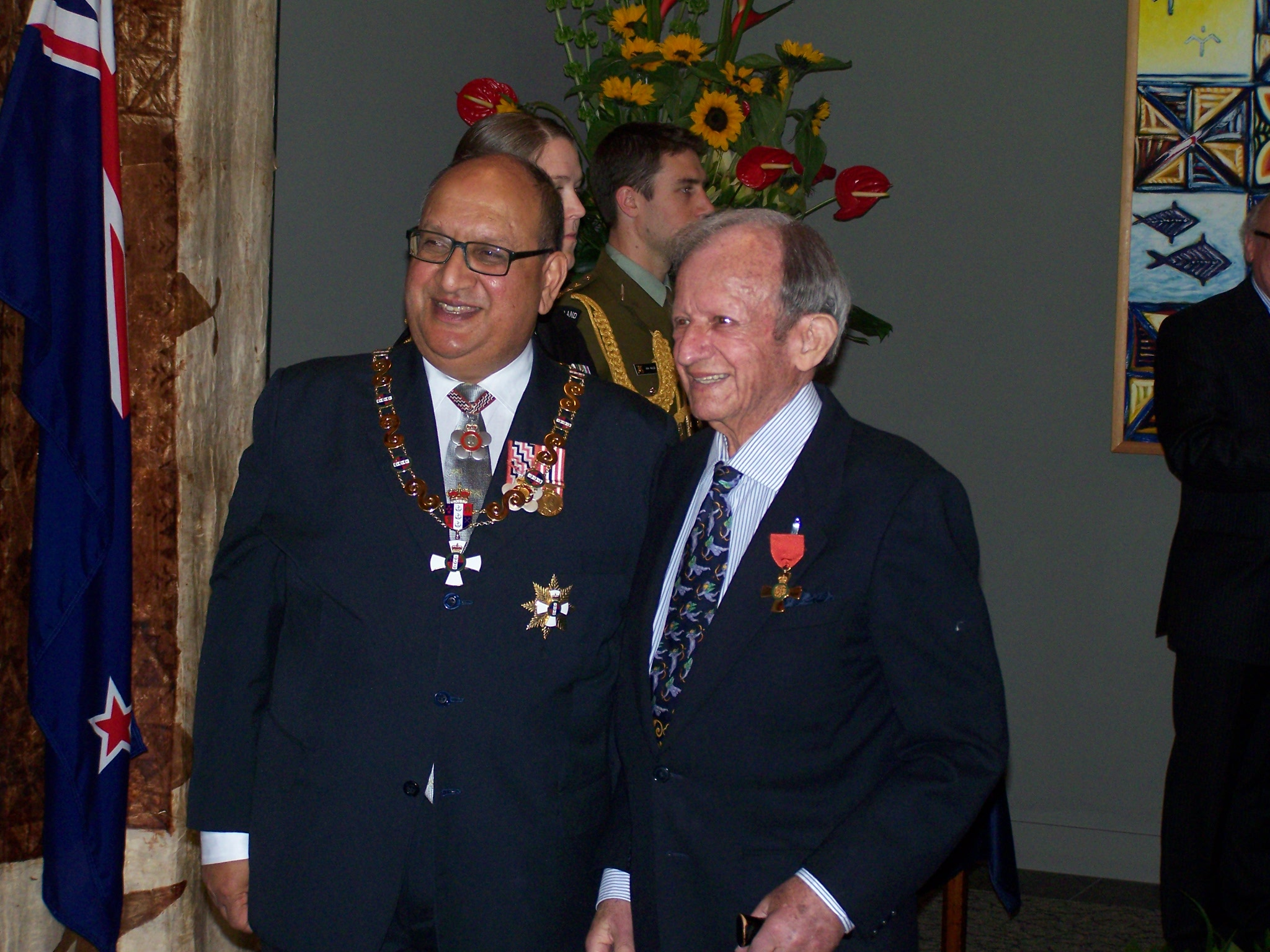
Fisher (right) in 2009, after his investiture as an Officer of the New Zealand Order of Merit by the governor-general, Sir Anand Satyanand

Gurshon Fisher ONZM (11 December 1920 – 20 July 2010), generally known as Gus Fisher, was a philanthropist and leading figure in the New Zealand fashion industry. He headed the fashion house El Jay for 50 years, introducing Parisian style to New Zealand, and was the New Zealand agent for Christian Dior for 33 years from 1955 until 1988. In 2001, the University of Auckland opened the Gus Fisher Gallery, named after him in recognition of his contribution to the gallery. In 2010, Fisher and his wife Irene were the recipients of the fifth annual Arts Foundation of New Zealand Award for Patronage.

Fisher had a love of beauty and was a passionate collector of painting, sculpture and objets d'art.

== Life ==
Fisher was born in Paraparaumu, New Zealand, on 11 December 1920. He was the youngest of six children of parents Michael Fisher and Fanny Dabscheck. His father, Michael, was a Jewish immigrant from Shumsk in Ukraine (then Russia) via London. His mother, Fanny, was the daughter of Russian Jews who had immigrated to Australia.

Gus was eight years younger than his eldest brother Sir Woolf Fisher, co-founder of Fisher and Paykel, the very successful appliance company.

At 15, Gus left school and went to work for his second brother Louis Jacob (Lou). Lou founded El Jay (named after his initials) as a whiteware importing and distribution business. After the imposition of whiteware import tariffs Lou decided to diversify and began to manufacture women's clothing. This is where Gus Fisher excelled.

Gus Fisher served in Tonga during World War II as a gunnery sergeant. He returned to Auckland in 1945 to become managing director of El Jay.

== Fashion ==
While the young Queen Elizabeth II was the fashion role model for most New Zealand women of the 1950s, Fisher instead looked to Paris for influence. He travelled there every year to see first-hand the new designs and fabrics and to experience the mood and feel of the fashion trends. For his own fashion label, El Jay, he interpreted French couture and created his own version of uncluttered European elegance, making it available to women in New Zealand. This commitment to experiencing the real thing led to not just a keen awareness of the latest trends but also to the establishment of relationships with the Paris couturiers.

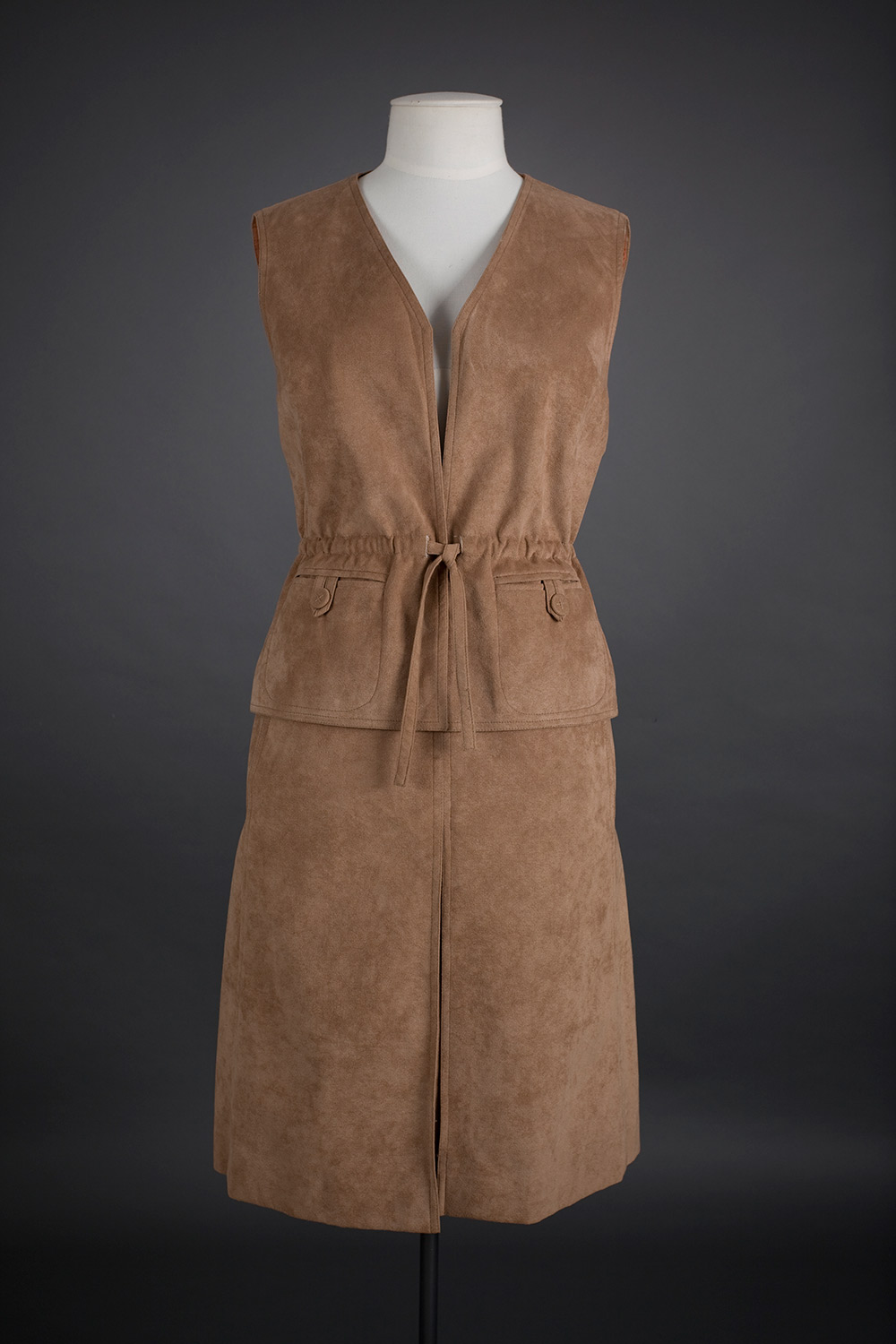
An ultra suede jerkin and skirt by El Jay, circa 1980. Photo by New Zealand Fashion Museum.

This in turn led to El Jay becoming the New Zealand licensee for Christian Dior, giving it the exclusive rights to manufacture and sell Christian Dior originals and Christian Dior prêt-à-porter in the New Zealand market. The quality of the production from the house of El Jay is legendary, and Fisher never lost the Dior license, becoming the longest license holder in the world. He was the New Zealand agent for Dior from 1954 until El Jay closed its doors in 1988.

For 50 years, El Jay was sold in the top department stores and fashion boutiques, including his own flagship stores, the French Shop in Remuera, and the El Jay boutique in the 246 building, a 1960s retail development on Queen St in Auckland. When El Jay introduced their ultra suede line in the late 1970s, the ground floor store in 246 was redeveloped for this new range.

The contribution of Fisher and his El Jay label was celebrated in 2010 by the "Looking Terrific – the Story of El Jay" pop up exhibition of the New Zealand Fashion Museum at the Gus Fisher Gallery. Curated by Doris de Pont, the exhibition showcased over 50 vintage garments by El Jay.

In 2013, more than 50 original Christian Dior 'look-book' catalogues dating back to the 1950s, collected by Fisher, were donated by his son, Michael, to the Dior archive in Paris, where they would be kept in climate controlled conditions.

El Jay's 720sq m main office in Kingston Street, Auckland, has remained unused since 1988 and still held much of the firm's remaining stock at the time of Fisher's death in 2010.

== Honours and awards ==
- 1961 – Wool Awards, Supreme Award. This highest accolade was given to El Jay in the award's inaugural year, setting an aspirational goal for the growing ranks of local high fashion manufacturers.
- 1973 – Eve Fashion Awards, Best Pure Wool Garment, Best Wool Knit Garment, International Award. Fisher was awarded this award for his "full length black black velvet coat dress edged with black petersham braid with most dramatic collar." The compere then announced that there had been one garment that outclassed all others. "He reported that it was of such a high standard that the judges felt it would be acclaimed anywhere in the world. They had decided to create a special award, the International Award, to acknowledge this achievement."
- 2005 – Honorary Doctor of Laws degree from The University of Auckland for his contribution to the development of academic programmes, the Fisher Parkinson's Fellowship, research and infrastructure and the university and his key role in establishing the Kenneth Myers Centre and his involvement in the Hood Fund.
- 2007 – Awarded a Mayor's Living Legend Award
- 2008 – Auckland Grammar, Old Boys' Augusta Award
- 2009 – Appointed an Officer of the New Zealand Order of Merit, for services to philanthropy, in the 2009 Queen's Birthday Honours
- 2010 – Fisher and his wife Irene were the recipients of the fifth annual Arts Foundation of New Zealand Award for patronage. To celebrate the award, the foundation gave the Fishers $20,000 to donate to artists or arts projects of their choosing. As with previous recipients, the Fishers initially doubled the amount for distribution with $20,000 of their own and announced that they would make four donations of $10,000 each. However, in a surprise announcement on the evening, Gus announced an extra recipient and further $10,000 donation.

== Philanthropy ==
In 2001, he contributed to the establishment of the Gus Fisher Gallery (and the School of Creative and Performing Arts) in the Kenneth Myers Centre at The University of Auckland to encourage debate on contemporary visual arts and culture and foster creative and academic research in visual arts.

2004 Gus Fisher Postdoctoral Fellowship to specialise in the research of neurogenerative diseases and a cure for Parkinson's disease. This was the first fellowship related to Parkinson's research offered in New Zealand.

Fisher made significant donations to a number of organisations, including the Auckland War Memorial Museum and community drug education and rehabilitation programmes.

Gus Fisher was a founding donor of the Hood Fund, which enables leading New Zealand academics to share their research overseas.

Further donations went to the Auckland Museum Redevelopment Programme, the Auckland City Art Gallery, the McCahon House Trust, the Auckland Festival, and The University of Auckland's Medical School.
