= Margo Barton =

New Zealand Fashion designer

Margo Barton is a New Zealand fashion designer, milliner and academic leader of the fashion design programme at Otago Polytechnic. In 2017 she took over the position of chair of the iD Dunedin Fashion Week organising committee.

== Early life ==
Barton grew up in Dunedin, New Zealand. She learned how to use a sewing machine when she was 11 years old, and started to experiment with making garments, including outfits for her high school ball. She also modelled in department store fashion parades and for a modelling agency, and entered a Miss Otago contest in which she won third place.

At the end of her second-to-last year of schooling her teachers recommended Barton study at secretarial college; Barton attended the college for only a week before returning to high school for her final year. On completing high school, Barton enrolled for a degree in home science at the University of Otago, although she withdrew after the first year.

== Career ==
Barton moved to Auckland and worked briefly as a model at the June Dally Watkins Deportment School and Model Agency, owned by Maysie Bestall-Cohen. She then returned to Dunedin and worked for two years as a pattern-grader scaling patterns to different sizes at a clothing manufacturing company Sew Hoy and Sons.

In 1981 Barton moved to Sydney, Australia. As pattern-grading was moving to a computer-based process, she decided to train as a designer at Sydney fashion school The Dress Design Studio, known today as the Fashion Design Studio. During the course, her hat designs were noticed by Patricia Merk from Dolly magazine and Merk hired her to design hats for the magazine's fashion shoots.

On completion of her studies, Barton worked as a designer for the Cruise and Midnight Cruise labels, and the Pierre Cardin label. In 1989, Barton returned to Dunedin and started her own fashion line, followed by her own millinery business in 1992. In 1990, she took a part-time position tutoring in fashion drawing and fashion design at the Otago Polytechnic School of Design, which later became a full-time position. She still designed for her own labels, and in 1992 three of her swimwear designs were in the finals of the Benson & Hedges Fashion Design Awards.

In 2012, Barton completed a Ph.D degree through Royal Melbourne Institute of Technology on millinery. Her thesis was titled Sketching Millinery in Three Dimensions: A Journey Between Physical and Digital Spaces, and studied animation software as a tool for sketching and pattern-making hats.

In 1999 a collaborative entry with fellow Dunedin designer Andrea Bentley reached the finals in the Mittelmoda Fashion Designer Awards in Italy. The experience inspired Barton to establish a similar competition in Dunedin. In 2005 the annual iD International Emerging Designer Awards was launched and has been held alongside iD Dunedin Fashion Week every year since.
