= Doris de Pont =

New Zealand fashion designer

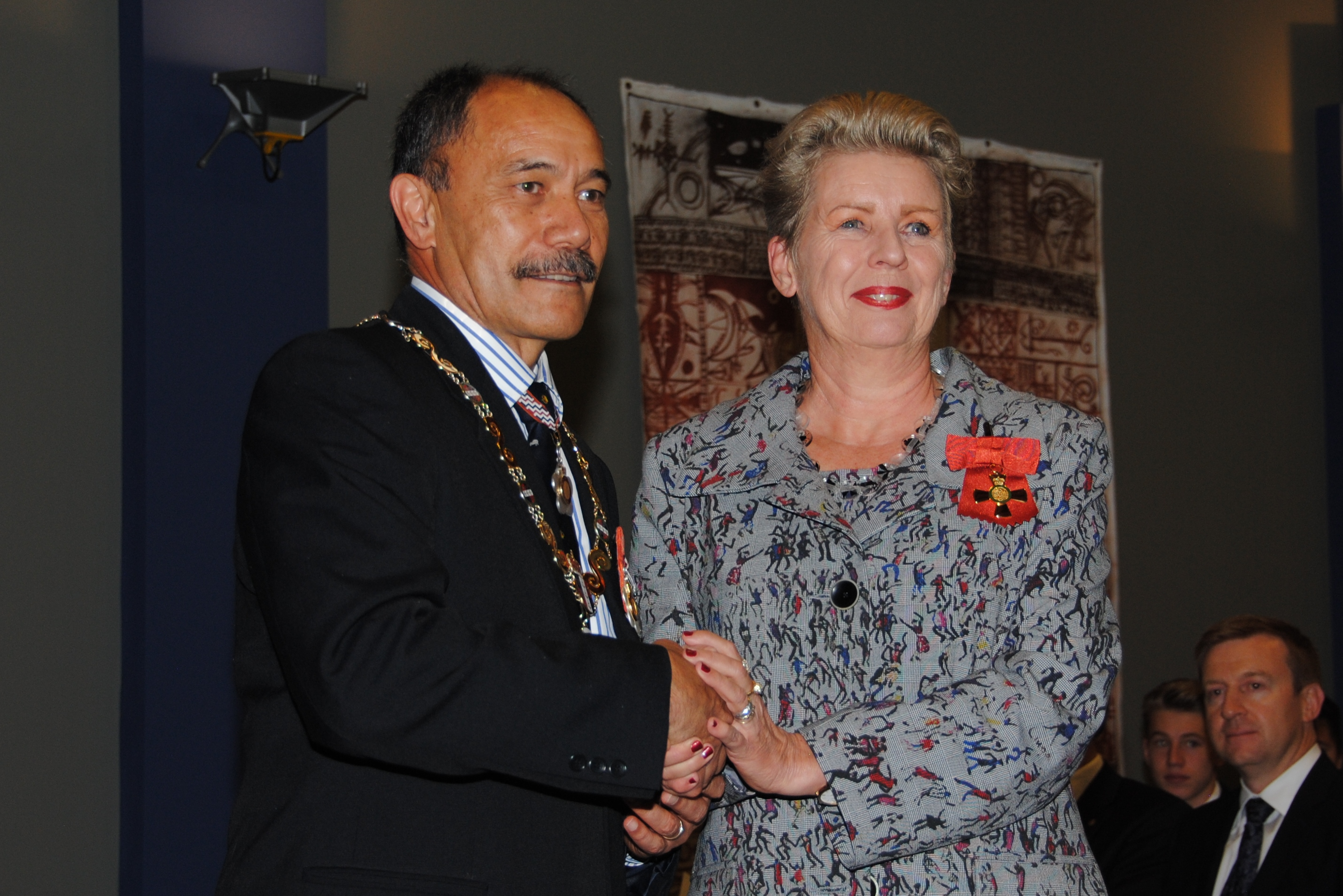
- de Pont received the Insignia of an Officer of the New Zealand Order of Merit for services to fashion
- Born: 1954 (age 71–72); Auckland, New Zealand
- Education: University of Auckland (BA)
- Occupations: Primary school teacher, fashion designer, curator, author

Doris de Pont ONZM (born 1954) is a New Zealand fashion designer and founder of the New Zealand Fashion Museum.

== Early life and education ==
Doris de Pont was born in Auckland, New Zealand in 1954. Her parents emigrated to New Zealand around 1952 from the Netherlands. Her maternal grandfather was a tailor and owned the family clothing business: established in 1840. Her father's family made football boots and shoes. Both family businesses contributed to the textile industry in Tilburg. de Pont started sewing at a young age and continued to sew while studying for a Bachelor of Arts in anthropology and political studies at the University of Auckland and completed her teacher training in the early-1970s.

== Career ==
After her studies, de Pont worked as a teacher for several years before moving to the Netherlands, where she lived between 1978 and 1984. During this time she found work at the Rudolf Steiner School in The Hague, and also designed and made clothing as part of a women's fashion collective.

After returning to New Zealand, de Pont met Jack and Trelise Cooper at a night class for pattern making at Auckland Institute of Technology. It was through this connection that de Pont acquired the lease for her first boutique situated at 13 O'Connell Street, Auckland. The shop opened in June 1985 and sold her designs under the label 'Design: Doris de Pont'. In 1994 she joined up with textile designer Adrienne Foote to establish the fashion label DNA which was sold in New Zealand, Australia, the UK and Denmark. In 2002 de Pont and Foote parted ways and the DNA label became 'Doris de Pont'. de Pont was known particularly for her designs that incorporated the imagery of New Zealand artists including Richard Killeen and John Pule, and the New Zealand writer Gregory O'Brien.

During the 1990s, de Pont was the designer of the uniforms of crews of Niue's airline, Niue Airline

Items by de Pont are held in the collections of the Auckland War Memorial Museum, Te Papa and the National Gallery of Victoria.

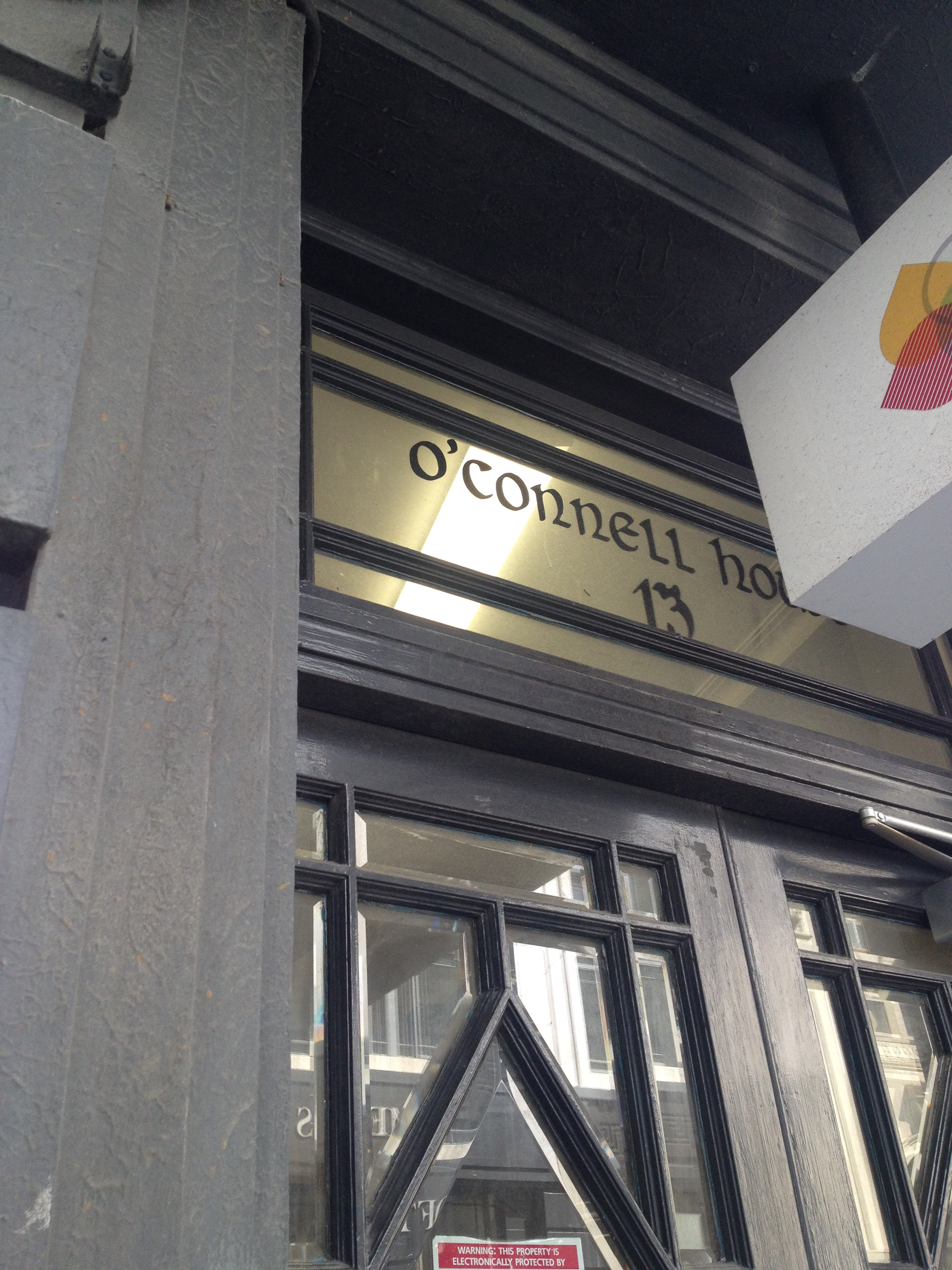
Site of Doris de Pont's first boutique, 13 O'Connell Street, Auckland.

Retiring from fashion in 2008, de Pont undertook a BA (Honours) in Museum and Heritage Studies at the University of Auckland, and after graduating founded the New Zealand Fashion Museum where she is the director and curates exhibitions.

== Publications ==
As a curator and fashion historian, de Pont is the author or editor of a number of publications and catalogues, including:

- Looking terrific : the story of El Jay, Auckland: Centre for New Zealand Art, Research and Discovery (University of Auckland) and the New Zealand Fashion Museum, 2010. ISBN 9780473169855
- Black : the history of black in fashion, society and culture in New Zealand, Auckland: Penguin Books, 2012. ISBN 9780143566953
- Strands : weaving a new fabric, Auckland: Objectspace, 2015. ISBN 9780994122872
- Walk the walk : A history of fashion in the city, Auckland: New Zealand Fashion Museum, 2017. ISBN 9780994114747

== Awards and recognition ==
In 1990, Doris won the Hugh Wright Menswear Award at the Benson & Hedges Fashion Design Awards.

In 2013, de Pont was invested as an Officer of the New Zealand Order of Merit for services to fashion.

In 2019 de Pont was awarded a Museum Medal as a Companion of Auckland War Memorial Museum in recognition of her achievements to the public service of Auckland Museum
