= F*INK =

f*INK
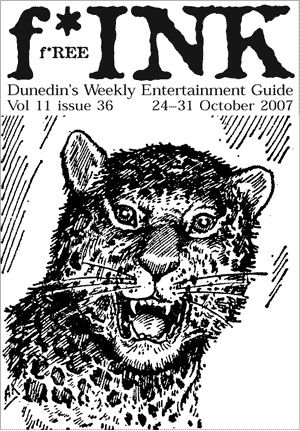
- f*INK cover from 2007
- Frequency: Weekly
- Format: A3, folded to A6
- Publisher: Martin Kean; Caroline McCaw
- First issue: 1996
- Company: 2009
- Country: New Zealand
- Based in: Dunedin
- Website: www.fink.net.nz

f*INK Weekly Entertainment Guide was a free weekly guide owned by Martin Kean and Caroline McCaw. It was published each Wednesday from February to December, from 1996-2009 in Dunedin, New Zealand. The aim of the guide was to provide free information about events to the local community using cheap one-colour printing but with a distinctive design style. Part of f*INK's mission was support of and collaboration with artist networks, bands and musicians, including those that grew out of the Dunedin sound.

== History ==
In June 1996, Dunedin, New Zealand, Caroline McCaw and Martin Kean together with Allan Thommason (aka OziBsy) published the first issue of f*INK, in response to a lack of entertainment listings for band events and dance parties in the usual media outlets such as the Otago Daily Times. f*INK was the first of many A6-sized free paper gig guides in New Zealand, and has outlasted many similar guides.

f*INK's reputation as a consistent source of entertainment information meant that it was popular for more than twelve years. f*INK has also published articles during its history that document the growth of alternative communities in Dunedin and Otago. f*INK has published free comics in every issue of f*INK, notably work by Indira Neville, and 'City of Tales' by Stefan Neville and Clayton Noone.

In 1999, f*INK published Dunedin maps and Arts & Fashion maps that won support from the Dunedin City Council Visitor Centre. Kevin Thompson, the Visitor Centre manager in 1999 described the A3-sized fold-up maps as "a very good working tool for us."

An exhibition of ten years of f*INK issues was hosted by Dunedin Public Libraries in June 2007.

f*INK was recommended by two travel books/guides: Lonely Planet and Rough Guides. In the 2002 edition Lonely Planet New Zealand writes, "Entertainment: The Otago Daily Times newspaper lists what's on around the city, but the best publication is the free f*INK, available around town or online at www.fink.net.nz." The Rough Guide to New Zealand of 2002 states, "For the latest on the Dunedin Sound, check out f*INK the free entertainment pamphlet available all around town, including the visitor centre (or see www.fink.net.nz), which keeps track of Dunedin's bands, singers and songwriters."

The publication was sold in 2008 to Carmen Norgate, resurrecting the entertainment guide as 'INK, which was published weekly until 2012.

== See also ==
- Dunedin - Media
