= Shortland Street, Auckland =

Street in Auckland, New Zealand

Coordinates: 36.8465°S 174.7668°E

Shortland Street
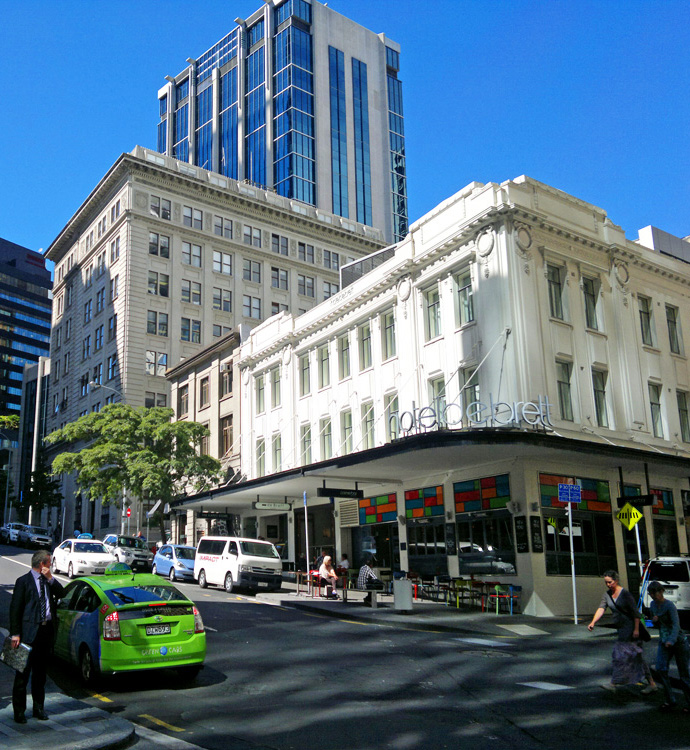
- Length: 0.35 km (0.22 mi)
- Location: Auckland CBD, New Zealand
- Postal code: 1010
- West end: Queen Street
- East end: Princes Street

Shortland Street was the initial commercial street of Auckland and remains a key financial and legal centre for Auckland city. It runs east from Queen Street up to Princes Street, providing a connection from the business district to the Auckland High Court and University of Auckland.

== History ==
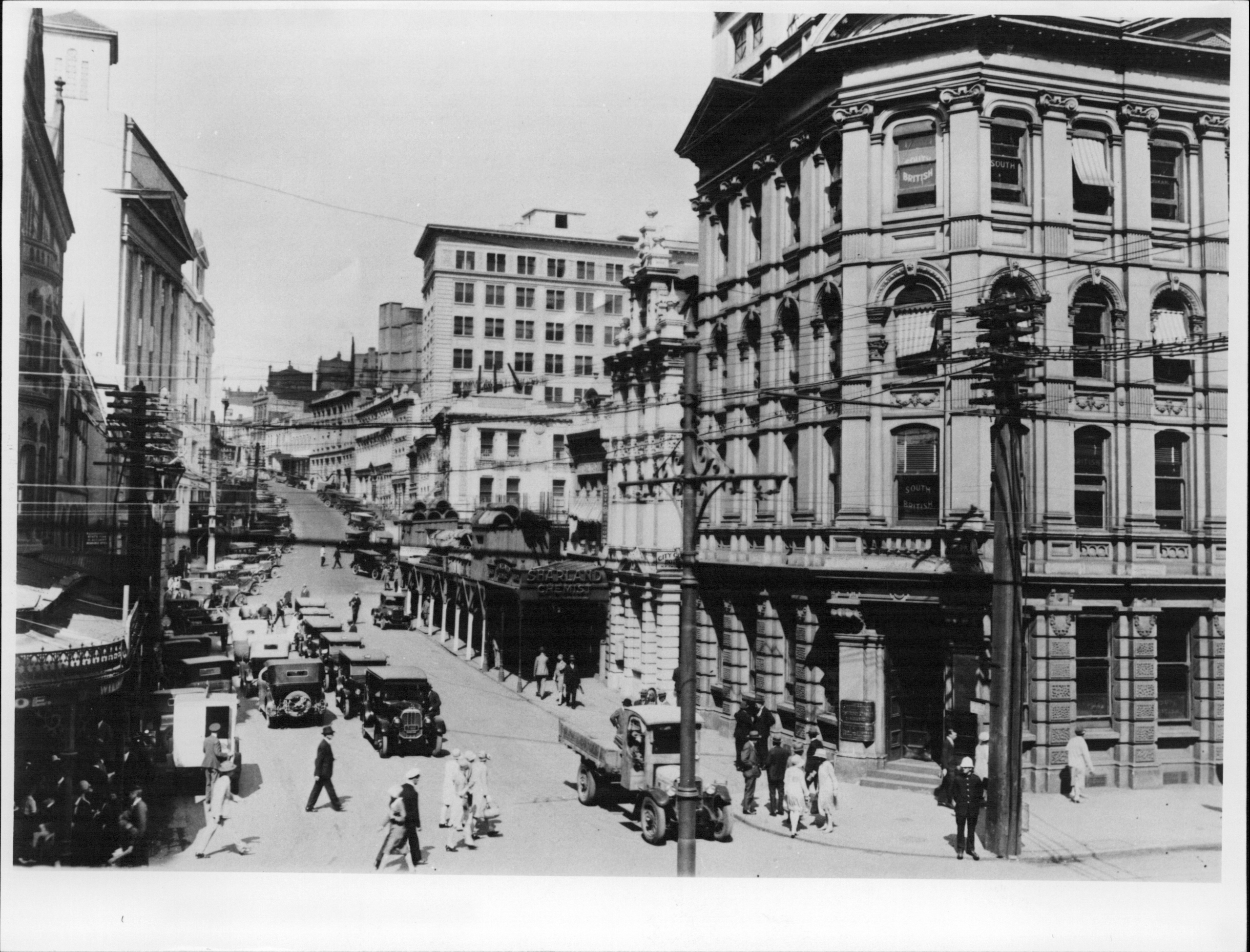
Shortland Street seen in the late 19th / early 20th century from Queen Street

Shortland Street, initially called Shortland Crescent, was the initial main street of Auckland, built close to the shoreline of Commercial Bay (since reclaimed), established and metalled by 1844. Fore Street (now Fort Street) was built a block north on the shore of Commercial Bay in 1850. The street was named for Willoughby Shortland, the first Colonial Secretary of New Zealand.

Shortland Street was the earliest commercial hub of Auckland. John Logan Campbell, David Nathan, and other early business figures in Auckland established their first stores on Shortland Street in the 1840s. The street was also ceremonially used as a way to visit Point Britomart (then a military camp), by figures such as Governor William Hobson. In 1858, a major fire broke out on the street, destroying the wooden buildings in the area.

By the 1860s, Queen Street had eclipsed Shortland Street as the primary commercial street for the township, after the land reclamation of Commercial Bay. The street was home to the Auckland Star, one of the major newspapers for Auckland in the late 19th and 20th centuries, as well as the Auckland Club, a gentlemen's club.

Soap opera Shortland Street was named for the street, after it was originally planned to be filmed in a TVNZ-owned studio at 74 Shortland Street.

== Demographics ==
The statistical area of Shortland Street, which includes Fort Street and the area between Lorne Street and Kitchener Street, covers 0.13 km^{2} (0.050 sq mi) and had an estimated population of 2,070 as of June 2025, with a population density of 15,923 people per km^{2}.

Historical population
Year	Pop.	±% p.a.
2006	816	—
2013	1,722	+11.26%
2018	1,602	−1.43%
2023	1,956	+4.07%

Shortland Street had a population of 1,956 in the 2023 New Zealand census, an increase of 354 people (22.1%) since the 2018 census, and an increase of 234 people (13.6%) since the 2013 census. There were 1,020 males, 915 females and 18 people of other genders in 1,317 dwellings. 11.3% of people identified as LGBTIQ+. The median age was 35.1 years (compared with 38.1 years nationally). There were 45 people (2.3%) aged under 15 years, 624 (31.9%) aged 15 to 29, 1,068 (54.6%) aged 30 to 64, and 216 (11.0%) aged 65 or older.

People could identify as more than one ethnicity. The results were 50.0% European (Pākehā); 5.8% Māori; 4.1% Pasifika; 42.3% Asian; 5.5% Middle Eastern, Latin American and African New Zealanders (MELAA); and 1.7% other, which includes people giving their ethnicity as "New Zealander". English was spoken by 95.4%, Māori language by 1.5%, Samoan by 0.8%, and other languages by 41.9%. No language could be spoken by 0.9% (e.g. too young to talk). New Zealand Sign Language was known by 0.5%. The percentage of people born overseas was 63.7, compared with 28.8% nationally.

Religious affiliations were 23.0% Christian, 3.5% Hindu, 2.9% Islam, 0.5% Māori religious beliefs, 4.0% Buddhist, 0.8% New Age, 0.3% Jewish, and 1.5% other religions. People who answered that they had no religion were 57.2%, and 6.7% of people did not answer the census question.

Of those at least 15 years old, 1,047 (54.8%) people had a bachelor's or higher degree, 549 (28.7%) had a post-high school certificate or diploma, and 321 (16.8%) people exclusively held high school qualifications. The median income was $55,500, compared with $41,500 nationally. 438 people (22.9%) earned over $100,000 compared to 12.1% nationally. The employment status of those at least 15 was that 1,146 (60.0%) people were employed full-time, 198 (10.4%) were part-time, and 57 (3.0%) were unemployed.

== Notable locations ==
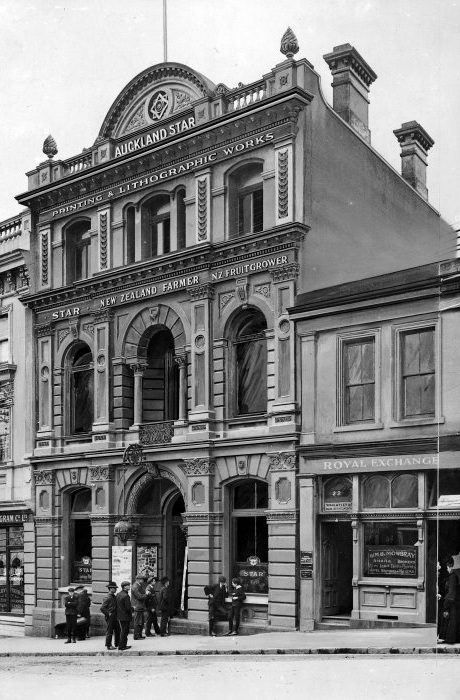
Auckland Star building c.1910

- Blacketts Building, corner of Queen Street and Shortland Street, 1879, South British Insurance building.
- South British Insurance Company building, 5–13 Shortland Street, 1920s.
- Jean Batten Place Departmental Building, 12 Shortland Street, 1942. Government office/Post Office until 1989.
- Hotel DeBrett, 15–19 Shortland Street, 1860 but rebuilt 1920s, called the Commercial Hotel until 1959.
- Auckland Star building, 28 Shortland Street, c.1889–1989.
- General Buildings, 29–27 Shortland Street, 1928.
- Auckland Club, 34 Shortland Street, 1883–2010, gentleman's club.
- Vero Centre, 48 Shortland Street, 2000, 38-storey office tower.
- Kenneth Myers Centre, 74 Shortland Street, built 1934 as a broadcasting studio for 1YA, and later used by Television New Zealand.
  - Gus Fisher Gallery, located in the Kenneth Myers Center.
- Shortland Flats, 93 Shortland Street, 1924, apartment building.
- Churton Memorial, corner of Shortland Street and Emily Place, 1909, memorial to Reverend John Churton, first minister of St Paul's Church.
