= Annie Bonza =

New Zealand fashion designer

- Born: Annie Cole; 17 March 1940 (age 86); New Zealand
- Occupation: Fashion designer

Annie Bonza (née Cole, born 17 March 1940) is a New Zealand fashion designer and a pioneer of boutique fashion. Her signature 'doodle' style consists of braiding, ribbon, beading, embroidery and hand painting clothing with Māori and Polynesia influences. Her work has been exhibited at Te Papa and has won awards at the Benson & Hedges Fashion Design Awards in 1971 and 1989.

== Early life ==
Annie Bonza was born Annie Cole in Te Kūiti, New Zealand. At age 16, she moved to Auckland where she began a cutting and design apprenticeship at Chadwick and Bray, a large clothing manufacturer. In her time there she was exposed to pre-war patterns of Corneli lace which would go on to inspire her later work.

== Career ==
Her first design job was at Pour Vous, a company which stocked department stores throughout New Zealand. Her designs gained her a high commendation at the British Golden Shears Awards. In 1964 she moved to Sydney to work at the salon of Robert White. The salon produced afternoon and cocktail wear. In Australia Bonza met Mike Brown who she would later marry and have a son with. Brown encouraged her to use her designs as a form of self-expression and to launch her own label 'Annie Bonza.' After her marriage ended she took on the name of the label as her own.

Bonza returned to Auckland in 1966 where she set up one of the first Boutique stores in New Zealand, Boutique 202. By designing clothes for the dancers on the New Zealand Television show C'mon Bonza's work quickly became known throughout New Zealand. Her clothes were made distinctive by her use of braiding and writing on clothing.

Bonza moved to the Cook Islands in the mid 1970s. She opened up a shop ‘Mekameka’ in Rarotonga. This store catered mostly to tourist but also sold muumuu to local women. While here she was inspired by Tivaevae patterns and techniques which would feature in her later work. She would return to Rarotonga again in 1996 to work on private commissions.

Annie Bonza’s clothes have been worn by Rangimārie Hetet, Dame Te Atairangikaahu and Adi Litia.

At least one of Annie Bonza's dresses are in the collection of Auckland War Memorial Museum.

== Awards and recognition ==
- 1962 Highly Commended, Golden Shears Awards.
- 1971 Supreme Award winner, Benson & Hedges Fashion Design Awards.
- 1989 Benson & Hedges Fashion Design Awards.

=== Exhibitions ===
- 2001, Dress Down Under: Award Winning Fashion 1970–2001, National Library of New Zealand.
- 2006, Annie Bonza: Fashion Explosion, Museum of New Zealand Te Papa Tongarewa.
- 2013, Home Sewn, Dowse.
