= Landmark House =

Historic building in Auckland, New Zealand

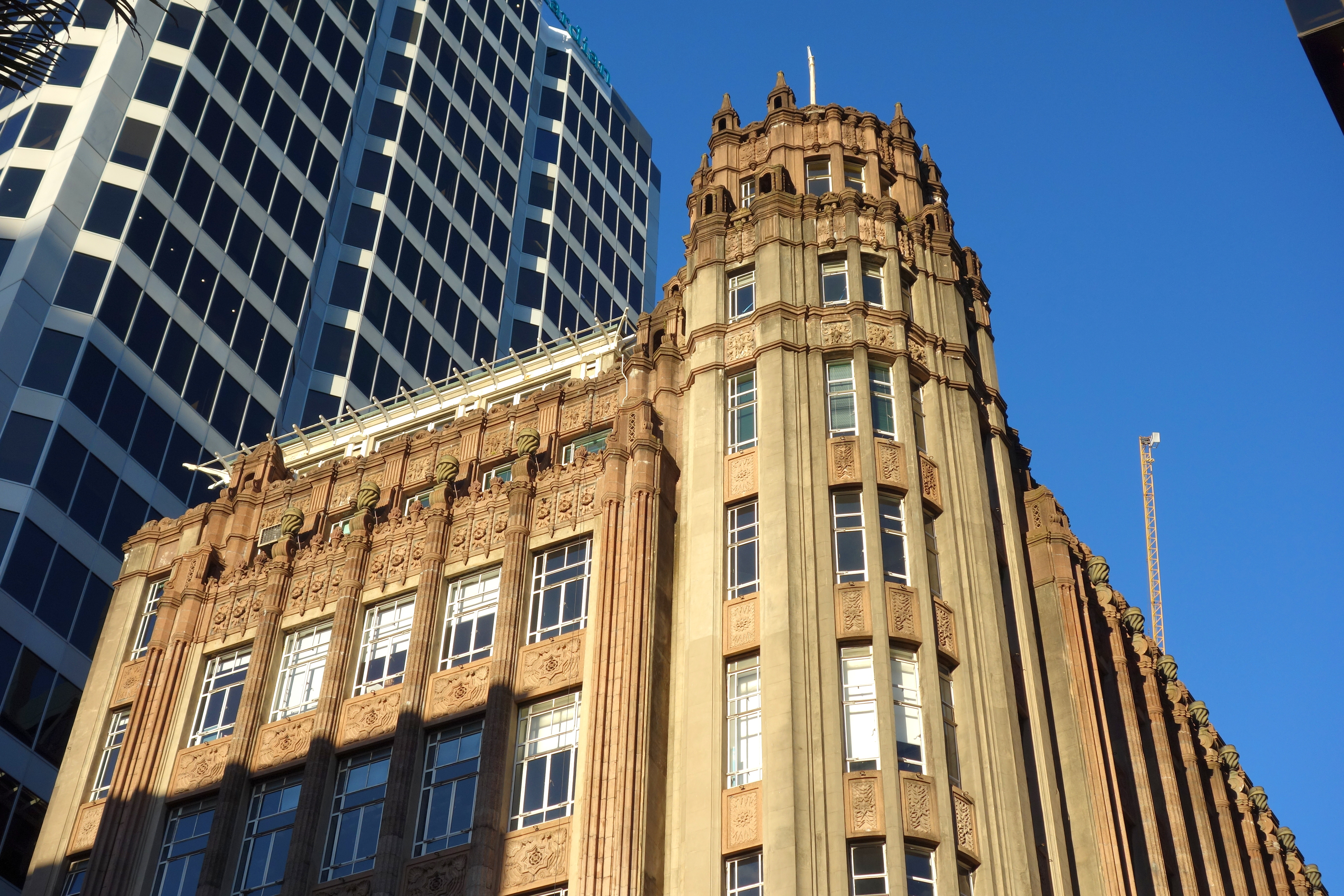
- View from Queen Street
- Interactive map of the Landmark House area

General information
- Architectural style: Art Deco, Neo-Gothic
- Location: Auckland, New Zealand, 187–189 Queen Street
- Coordinates: 36°50′54″S 174°45′55″E
- Completed: 6 March 1930

Design and construction
- Architect: Wade and A. M. Bartley

Heritage New Zealand – Category 1
- Designated: 3 March 1987
- Reference no.: 4470

Landmark House is a neo-Gothic building located at 187–189 Queen Street in Auckland, New Zealand. It was originally designed for the Auckland Electrical Power Board (AEPB) and constructed between 1928 and 1930. The architects responsible for the design were Alva Bartley and Thomas Edward Norman (Norman) Wade.

== History ==
The building was constructed in celebration of electricity superseding gas and coal as the predominant sources of energy in Auckland. It was intentionally opened on the same day as the Department of Public Works opened Arapuni Dam.

At the time of its construction, it was one of the tallest buildings in Auckland. Built in a bold and modern style, it was also the first building in Auckland to be floodlit and was proclaimed to have one of the fastest elevators in the country.

The building was originally eight stories high with a ninth floor added in 1933.

AEPB vacated the building in 1968, taking with them the panelled boardroom to their new headquarters in Nuffield Street, Newmarket. The interior of the building was substantially altered during the 1980s to work with the surrounding buildings. It was renovated again in 2000. Some original features of the lobby have been retained.
