= Kenneth Myers Centre =

Historic building in New Zealand

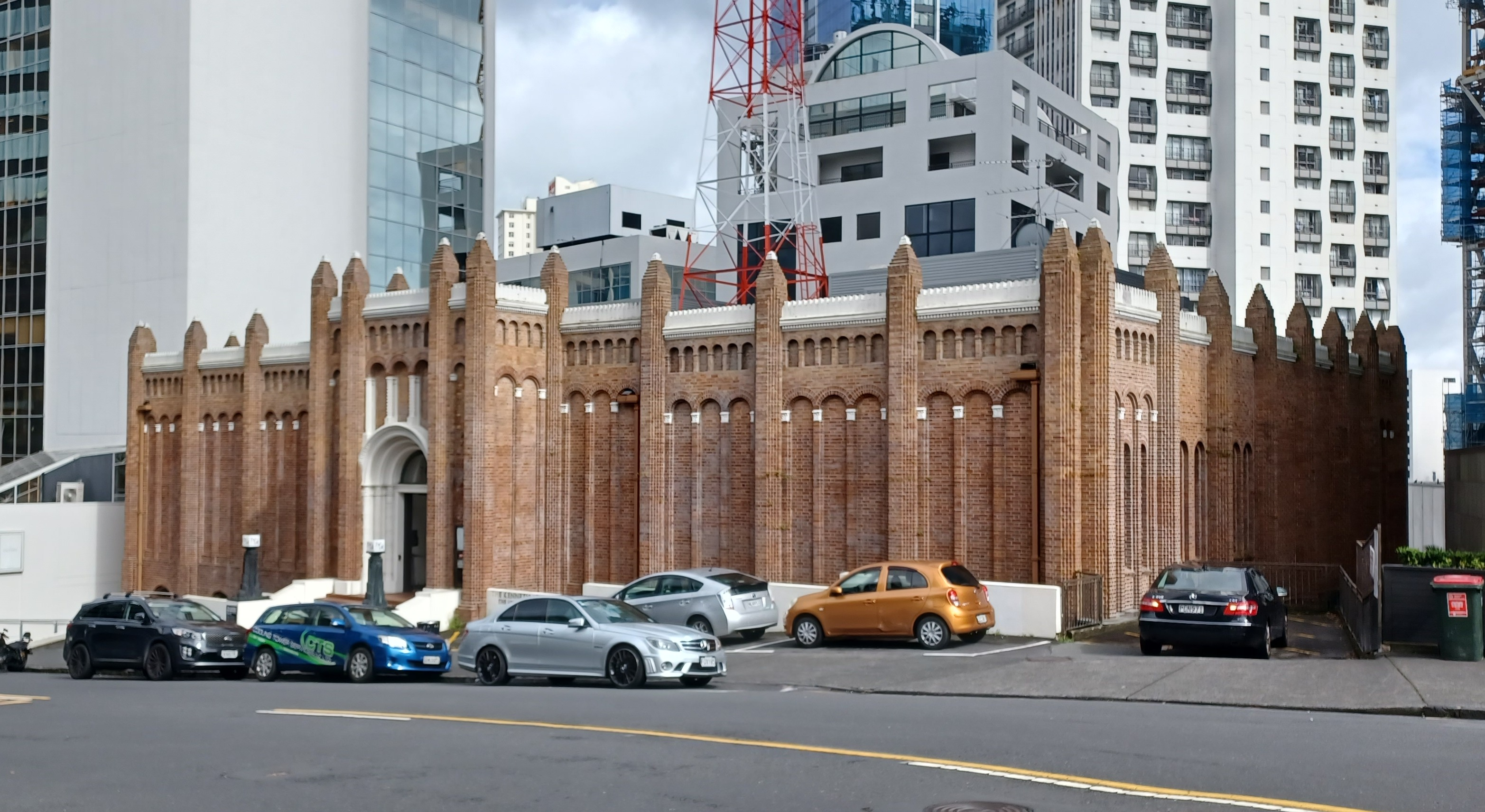
- Kenneth Myers Centre, November 2022
- Former names: 1YA, TVNZ

General information
- Type: Broadcasting station
- Architectural style: Neo-Romanesque
- Location: 74 Shortland Street, Auckland
- Coordinates: 36°50′48″S 174°46′10″E
- Completed: 1935
- Owner: University of Auckland

Design and construction
- Architect: Wade and A. M. Bartley

Website
- http://www.gusfishergallery.auckland.ac.nz

Heritage New Zealand – Category 1
- Designated: 15 February 1990
- Reference no.: 660

The Kenneth Myers Centre, also known by its original name 1YA Building, is a historic Neo-Romanesque building on Shortland Street, Auckland, New Zealand. Designed by Wade and Bartley and built between 1934 and 1935 for the 1YA radio station it later saw use as a television station from 1960 to 1989. Since 2000 it has been owned by the University of Auckland who use the building for performing arts and as a gallery. The building is registered as a category 1 building with Heritage New Zealand.

== History ==
1YA was the first licensed operator under the 1923 Radio Regulations Act. Due to constant changes in radio technology 1YA operated out of several locations around the City of Auckland before settling into the Shortland Street location; the technological improvements to radio led to the decision to build a purpose built facility at Shortland Street. Architects Norman Wade and Alva Bartley designed the purpose built structure, which started construction 1934 and finished in 1935.

Starting in 1959 the building was modified to serve as a television broadcaster, the building hosted the AKTV2 television station and was in June 1960 hosted the first news broadcast of Television New Zealand. 1YA vacated the premise in 1961 and Television New Zealand continued to use the facility until vacating it in 1989.

In 2000 Douglas Myers fundraised for the purchase of the building and gifted the building to the University of Auckland. The university performed a major renovation so the building could be used as a performing arts centre and gallery and named it the Kenneth Myers Centre after Douglas Myers' father. The gallery was funded by Gus Fisher, who is the namesake of the gallery. As of 2025 restoration work is being undertaken on the building.

== Description ==
The 1YA Building is constructed from brick and concrete and has 22 in (560 mm) thick walls and a lack of windows to improve acoustic quality of the facility and to comply with regulations for broadcasting buildings. Despite the neo-Romanesque façade the interior is Art Deco. Located on a ridge that overlooks the Auckland CBD, the building has a single storey façade on Shortland Street, but extends for another three levels down the hill to Fort Street at the back. Atop the building is a steel transmission tower. The building has a unique appearance, in part due to the steep location and lack of standards for radio buildings. The pinnacles have a ziggurat shape. The façade features arcading and a Romanesque moulded doorway. The foyer has a coloured glass dome surrounded by ornate plastering. The interior features plaster pilasters and corbels.

== Legacy ==
The 1YA Building is associated with both the advent of state radio and state television and the building, along with its transmission tower, is a landmark of the Auckland city centre. The building's non-modern design contrasts and stands out from the Chicago style architecture of the surrounding buildings.

The television show Shortland Street got its name from the initial production name The Shortland Street Project; initially the show was planned to be filmed in the 1YA Building but the location did not provide enough space for the set and filming was moved elsewhere. which was originally planned to be filmed in the building.
