= Caroline McCaw =

New Zealand professor in design at Otago Polytechnic

- Awards: Fulbright Scholarship, Sustained Excellence in Tertiary Teaching

Academic background
- Theses: The picnic papers; Identifying the Value of the Local Through Site-Specific Contemporary Art Projects in New Zealand (2016)
- Doctoral advisor: Pat Hoffie, Leoni Schmidt

Caroline McCaw is a New Zealand design academic, and is a full professor at the Otago Polytechnic, specialising in incorporating storytelling and cultural values into design communication.

== Academic career ==
McCaw completed Master of Fine Arts at Otago Polytechnic, with a thesis based around a location-specific picnic event held at four locations simultaneously and incorporating a webcast from Amsterdam. She also completed a PhD titled Identifying the Value of the Local Through Site-Specific Contemporary Art Projects in New Zealand at the Griffith University in Australia in 2016. Her thesis was supervised by Pat Heffie and Leoni Schmidt. McCaw then joined the faculty of the Otago Polytechnic, rising to full professor.

McCaw was awarded a Ako Sustained Teaching Excellence award in 2014. The citation noted that she "excels in using collaborative processes to engage learners and connect her teaching to community development and industry outcomes". In 2016 she was awarded a Fulbright Fellowship to become a Scholar-in-Residence at SUNY Canton.

In 2015, McCaw collaborated with Jane Malthus, Glen Leyton and Margo Barton to produce an exhibition of Dunedin fashion, A Darker Eden, held at Silo Park in Auckland. The display built on Dunedin's neo-Gothic reputation, had over 3000 visitors, and featured fashion by Otago Polytechnic graduates alongside established labels NOM*d, Mild Red, Tanya Carlson and Company of Strangers, and a section on iD Dunedin Fashion Week. McCaw and Leyton also collaborated with students to produce an exhibition at Tūhura Otago Museum on WWI nurses from Otago.

== Selected works ==
- McCaw, Caroline (16 July 2019). "One-size-fits-all focus will diminish us". Otago Daily Times.
- Malthus, Jane, McCaw, Caroline, Glen, Leyton and Barton, Margo. A Darker Eden, exhibition at Silo Park, Auckland, 13 Feb – 1 March 2015
- McCaw, C., Glen, L., Oliver, M., Wilson, J., and Scott, C. Who Cared? Otago Nurses in WWI, exhibition at Otago Museum, 26 September 2015 – 31 January 2016
- Malthus, J., McCaw C., Leyton, G., Barton M. (2015) Interplay and Inter-place: A collaborative exhibition addressing place-based identity in fashion design. International Association of Design Research Societies, Brisbane, Australia, 2 – 5 November
