= Niue Airline =

Niue defunct airline

Niue Airline LTD.
IATA	ICAO	Call sign
FN	-	-
- Founded: 1990
- Commenced operations: 1 July 1991
- Ceased operations: 1992
- Hubs: Niue International Airport
- Headquarters: Alofi, Niue
- Key people: Ray Young (CEO)

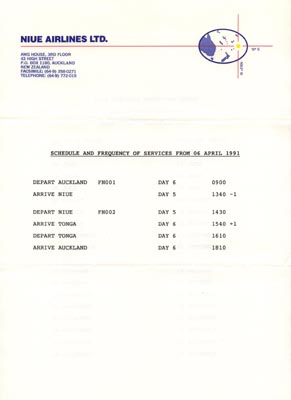
Niue Airline timetable, 6 April 1991

Niue Airline was an airline in Niue, established in 1990. It serviced the Auckland-Niue route weekly, and later fortnightly, until its closure in 1992. The route was operated by a chartered Air Nauru 737 and carried mail. Flights were sometimes cancelled if passenger numbers or freight was not enough to fund the flight. The airline was majority New Zealand-owned (with some Niuean investment).

The airline's uniforms were designed by Dutch-New Zealand fashion designer Doris De Pont. Niue Airlines was not linked to any international booking system, and so tickets could be purchased only at ticket offices, one of which was located in Auckland. The IATA code of the airline was FN.

== History ==
In October 1990, Niue Airlines flew twenty-three pupils (and their parents and teachers) to the island after discovering it had 40 vacant seats on a flight. The group from Three Kings Primary School in Auckland, whose travel was arranged at no cost, was greeted with garlands of flowers, appeared on local television, had a short swim in the ocean and were then farewelled by Premier Sir Robert Rex after a whirlwind trip.

In 1991, services were operated from Auckland to Niue, and returned via Tonga.

Towards the end of the airline's life, services were only operated between Pago Pago and Niue using a nine-seat Beechcraft King Air. Travelling from Auckland to Niue then required stopovers in Apia and Pago Pago. The airline ceased to operate in late 1992, when, after the Niuean government refused to provide bank guarantees for the purchase of aviation fuel, they defaulted on a fuel bill and their licence was cancelled.

== See also ==
- List of defunct airlines of New Zealand
- History of aviation in New Zealand
