= Trelise Cooper =

New Zealand fashion designer

Dame Trelise Cooper DNZM
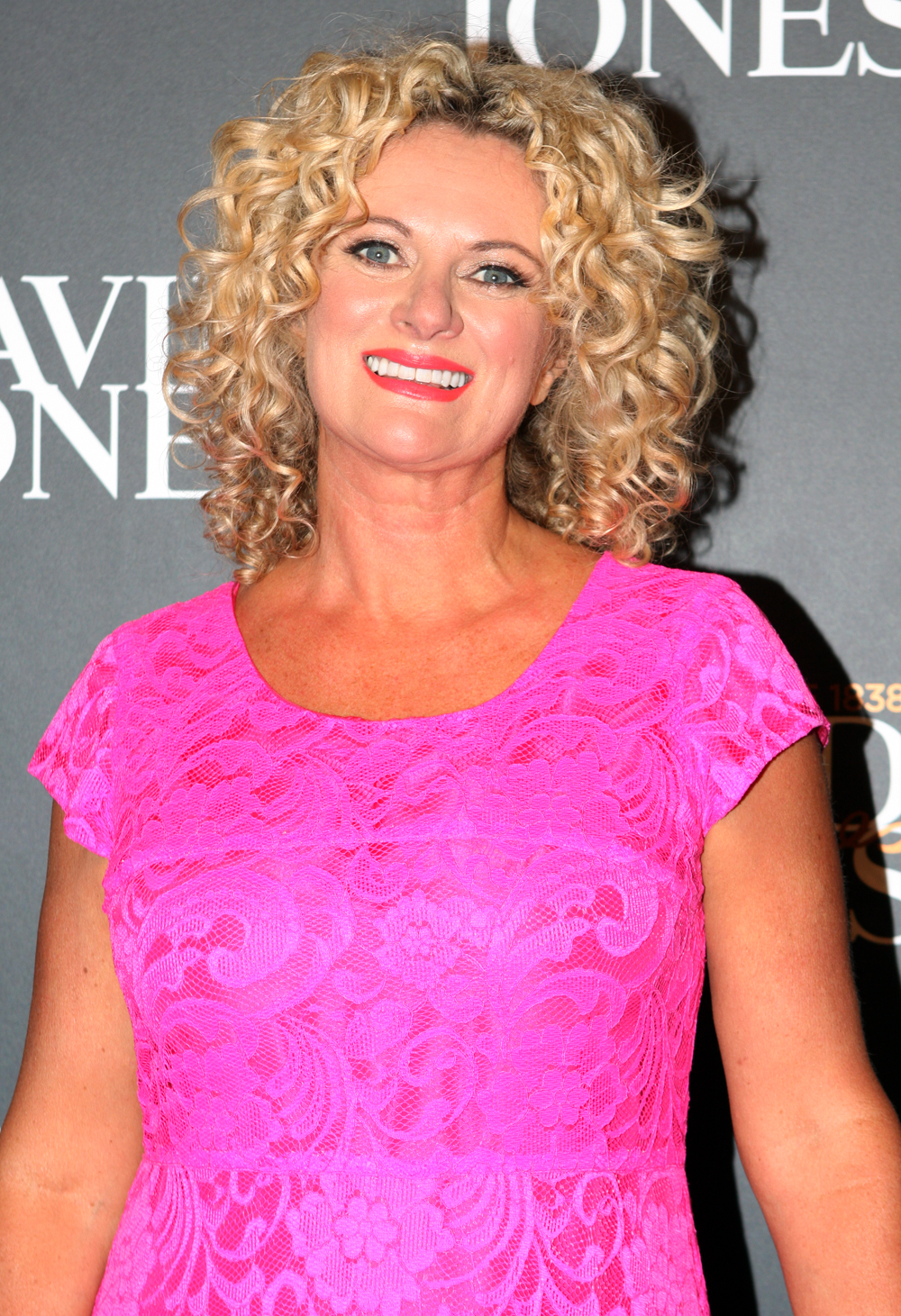
- Cooper in 2013
- Born: Trelise Pamela Neill; 1957 or 1958 (age 68–69); New Zealand
- Occupation: Fashion designer

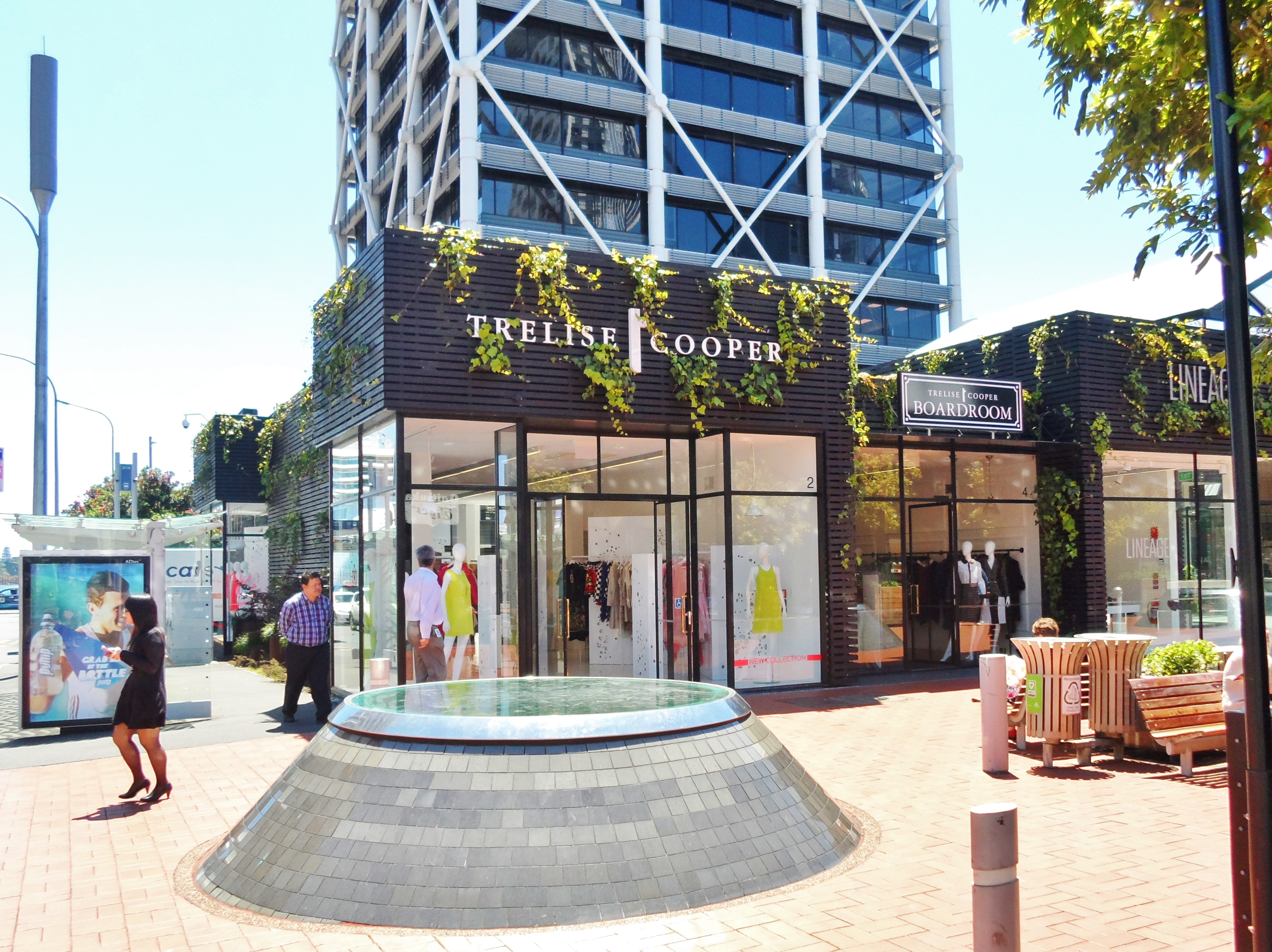
Trelise Cooper store in Auckland, New Zealand

Dame Trelise Pamela Cooper DNZM (née Neill; born 1957 or 1958) is a fashion designer from New Zealand. Her designs have featured in magazines such as Vogue, Marie Claire, Women's Wear Daily, InStyle and the television series Sex and the City.

== Early life ==
Cooper was born to Joe and Pam Neill, and grew up in Henderson, West Auckland. She attended Henderson High School, and volunteered at Lifeline crisis support service as a teenager.

She left school at the age of 15 and married two years later. She and her husband ran a building business together, but the marriage ended in divorce when Cooper was 21.

== Career ==
Cooper's design business began in the early 1980s, with her first boutique opening in 1985. She then took a break from business to have a baby, and returned in late 1996.

Cooper creates five clothing ranges - Trelise Cooper, Cooper by Trelise, COOP, Board Room and Trelise Cooper Kids, all of which she shows at New Zealand Fashion Week. Customers include Liv Tyler, Miley Cyrus, Lindsay Lohan, Stevie Nicks, Suri Cruise, Julia Roberts, and The Pussycat Dolls. She also produces Trelise Cooper Interiors, a fabric range made in association with textiles house Charles Parsons.

Cooper's signature fragrance 'Trelise' was launched in late 2009. It was designed by perfumer Yves Dombrowsky and has been described as an uplifting, positive scent.

In March 2009, she became the first New Zealand designer to stage a fashion show on board the Queen Mary 2 cruise ship.

Cooper is a patron of the Breast Cancer Research Trust, an advocate for domestic violence awareness and supports Habitat for Humanity. At 2009's New Zealand Fashion Week Cooper initiated an onsite house build to promote this charity.

She is also an environmental supporter, producing eco bags for supermarket chain Progressive Enterprises. She is involved with the UN-sponsored organisation MARITAGE International, which connects young women in developed and developing countries, and also mentors young people in New Zealand.

In December 2005, Cooper was involved in an intellectual property dispute with fellow New Zealand fashion designer Tamsin Cooper, objecting to Tamsin registering her name as a trademark. In July 2007, Cooper agreed to drop the suit and let Tamsin Cooper operate under her own name.

As of 2016, Cooper has 10 boutiques around the world, and her ranges are stocked in more than 200 stores in Australasia, Asia, Europe, America and the Middle East.

=== Recognition ===
The Trelise Cooper Kids Auckland flagship store won the supreme award at the 2007 New Zealand Retail Interior Design Awards.

In 2004, Cooper was named a Member of the New Zealand Order of Merit. In the 2014 New Year Honours, she was elevated to Dame Companion in the same Order.

In 2015, Cooper announced that it will be her final year as a manager. In 2015, her collections were included into the New Zealand Fashion Museum. In 2018, Cooper was inducted into the New Zealand Business Hall of Fame.

=== Controversies ===
In 2011 she and at least 10 of her models were accused of engaging in modern Orientalism by taping the models' eyes to change their shape to more resemble Asian features.

In 2014 Trelise Cooper sparked controversy when she repeated the same offense made by Victoria's Secret in 2012 and Chanel in 2013 by having models wear sacred Native American feathered headdresses. Cooper stated in her apology 'I genuinely respect and honour all cultures, races and religions. It was never my intention to disrespect another culture.' Originally described by the designer as portraying '70's bohemian vibes', many critics online pointed out the connection between nostalgia and ignorance in this incident. Filmmaker Taika Waititi was quoted as saying ''I think I understand what Trelise means by '70s vibes' - a time when it was cool to be culturally insensitive and racism was super awesome. Nice throw back to better times...'

In December 2020, Cooper was criticised for naming a new floral polyester dress design the "Trail of Tiers", after the forced relocation of about 46,000 American Indians between 1830 and 1850 by the United States Government. The sociologist Professor Joanne Kidman criticised Cooper for her perceived insensitivity to the historical suffering of Indigenous peoples. Cooper apologised for the hurt caused by the dress's name design and announced that the design would be removed from stores.

== Personal life ==
She has a husband, Jack, a stepdaughter, Nadia Cooper and a son Jasper Cooper. Nadia was charged with smuggling of Methamphetamine into one of the Mount Eden Prisons, as well as its distribution in 2008.
