= Wade and A. M. Bartley =

Architecture firm in New Zealand

Practice information
- Key architects: Norman Wade and Alva Martin Bartley
- Founded: 1919
- Dissolved: 1935
- Location: Auckland

Significant works and honors
- Buildings: Landmark House, Kenneth Myers Centre

Norman Wade and Alva Martin Bartley formed an architectural partnership which lasted from 1919 until around 1935. Together, and individually, they were prolific in designing some of the most iconic modern Auckland buildings of the period.

Some notable clients including the Auckland Electrical Power Board, the Auckland Harbour Board and Auckland Meat Co.

A number of the structures they designed which remain standing are listed on the Heritage New Zealand register.

== Norman Wade ==
Thomas Edward Norman Wade, better known as Norman Wade, was born 1880 and died in 1954. He trained under his father, Henry Greensmith Wade (of the architectural partnership Wade and Wade) alongside his brother Henry Logan Wade.

While Logan Wade took over his father's practice, Norman Wade formed the partnership Wade and Goldsbro' with George Selwyn Goldsbro’. Wade and Goldsbro' was formed in July 1902 and dissolved in July 1908.

After the dissolution of Wade and Goldsbro', Norman and his brother Henry worked together as Wade and Wade until Norman joined with Alva Bartley as Wade and A. M. Bartley around 1919.

Norman Wade was a secretary to the Auckland Branch of the New Zealand Institute of Architects.

Norman's Early Works
Date	Name	Location
1917	Waikaraka War Memorial	Waikaraka Park Cemetery

== Alva Martin Bartley ==
Alva Martin Bartley was born in Auckland in 1891 to Clement Bartley. He served in the first world war, and joined with Norman Wade upon his return from the war. He died in 1979.

== Works as Wade and A. M. Bartley ==
Works
Year	Description	Location	References
1920	Renovations to the interior of the Auckland Working Men's Club	Kitchener Street, Auckland (now part of AUT)	
1921	Statue of Robert Burns	Auckland Domain	
1922	Alterations to Auckland Electrical Board Building on	52 Fort Street, Auckland	
1922	Dargaville Municipal Chambers	39 Hokianga Rd, Dargaville	
1923	Alterations to Auckland Meat Co building	Great North Road, Auckland	
1923	Grandstand at Alexandra Park	Alexandra Park, Auckland	
1923	Upgrades to the Criterion Hotel	Devon Street, New Plymouth	
1923	Buildings on Upper Queen Street, Auckland	Near the Baptist Tabernacle, Upper Queen Street, Auckland	
1923	Block of 4 Shops	Pitt Street, Auckland	
1924	Proposed design for civic square. Came second to Gummer and Ford	Aotea Square	
1924	Premises in Victoria St in Dargaville for John Dempsey	Dargaville	
1924	Premises in Dargaville for Williams, Ball and Fanon	Dargaville	
1924	Pukekohe Hall	Pukekohe	
1924	Masonic Hall	Takapuna	
1925	Premises for the Franklin Racing Club	Pukekohe	
1925	Brick Shops in Royal Oak	Royal Oak	
1925	Upgrade to Hotel DeBrett, formerly known as Commercial Hotel	Auckland	
1927	AEPB building in Onehunga	Queen Street, Onehunga (now Onehunga Mall)	
1927	Kirikopuni butter factory	Dargaville	
1927	Auckland Meat Company	Symonds Street, Newton, Auckland	
1927	Premises for Patterson and Son	Cross Street, Newton, Auckland	
1927	Grandstand for Avondale Jockey Club	Avondale, Auckland	
1928	Auckland Harbour Board building	55 Customs Street East, Auckland	
1928	Fountain of Friendship lodge, Oddfellows	Corner of Newton Road and Dundonald Street, Newton, Auckland	
1929	Additions to the St John's Ambulance building	Rutland Street, Auckland	
1930	Landmark House	187–189 Queen Street, Auckland	
1931	H Stubbs Butchery	Queen Street, Warkworth	
1934	1YA Building	74 Shortland Street, Auckland	

== Designs after partnership ==
Works
Date	Description	Location	References
1938	Devonport Post Office (Norman Wade without Bartley)	Devonport, Auckland	
1939	Broadcasting House (1ZB) (Alva Bartley with Imi Porsolt) [demolished in 1990]	Corner of Durham West and Durham Lane, Auckland	
