= Bristol Shakespeare Festival =

Annual theatre festival in Bristol, England

The Bristol Shakespeare Festival is an open-air theatre festival founded in 2004 by Miles Gregory and held annually in the parks and green spaces of the city of Bristol, as well as in both traditional and non-traditional theatre spaces in the city.

The festival is a not-for-profit organisation that claims to be the largest professional open-air Shakespeare festival in the UK.

Running during the month of July, the festival plays host to a wide range of theatre companies, usually presenting between seven and ten full professional productions, from across the United Kingdom.

== See also ==
- List of festivals in the United Kingdom
- List of theatre festivals
