= Dennis Lattimer =

New Zealand mural artist (1946-2025)

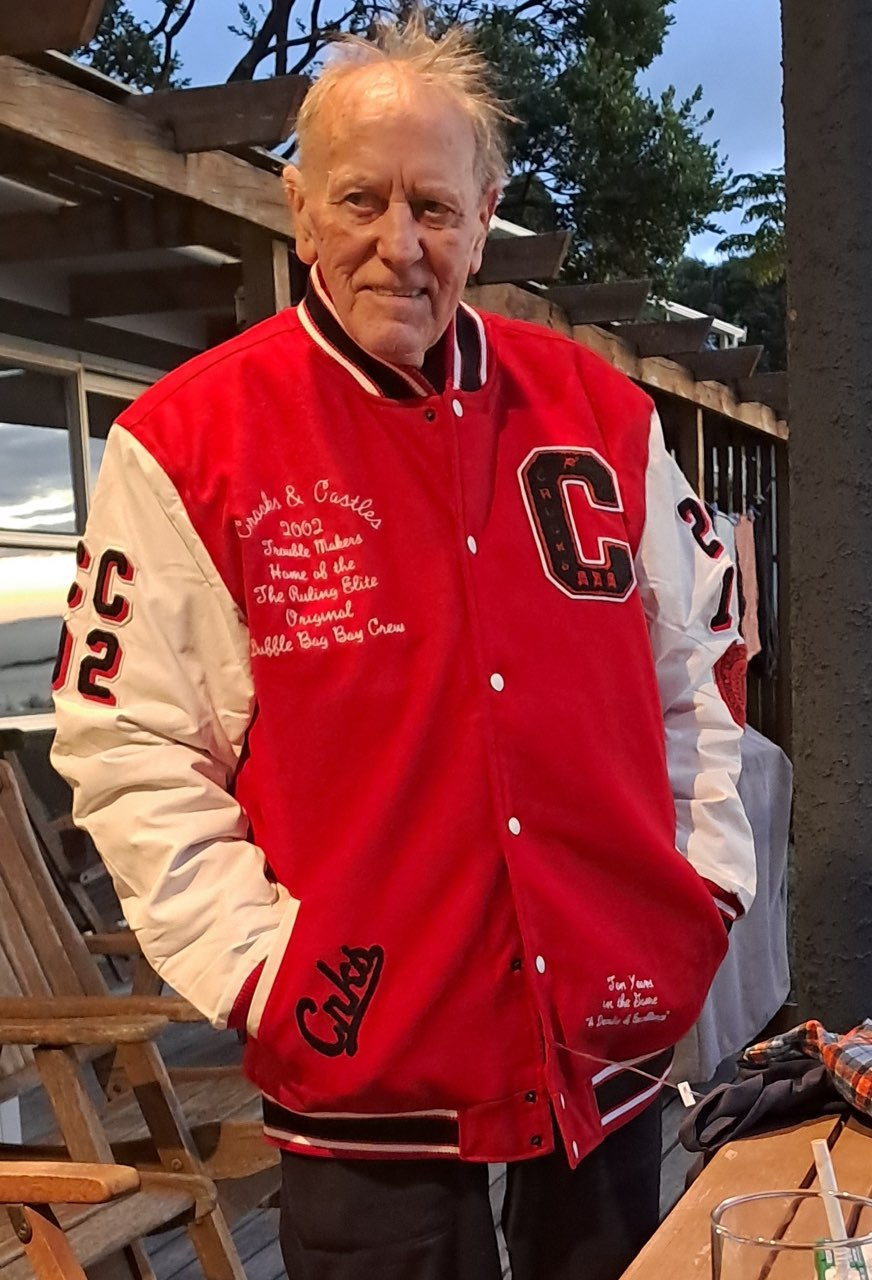
- Lattimer in May 2025
- Born: Dennis Arthur Lattimer; 28 April 1946
- Died: 1 July 2025 (aged 79); Coopers Beach, New Zealand
- Known for: Large-scale community murals
- Notable work: Reflections of Ōpunake (1998–2002); Pharmacies Thru the Ages (2012); Paihia Village Green history mural (2012)
- Style: Public art
- Relatives: Trish Gregory (sister); Miles Gregory (nephew)
- Awards: Resene Mural Masterpieces – best community mural (2012)

Dennis Arthur Lattimer (28 April 1946 – 1 July 2025) was a New Zealand mural artist and illustrator. Active during the 1990s through to the mid-2010s, he completed more than 30 permanent outdoor murals, most notably the series that gave the Taranaki town of Ōpunake its reputation as "Mural Town of the West".

== Life and career ==
Lattimer was born on 28 April 1946, the son of Nancy Pearl and Kenneth George Lattimer. He trained as a commercial signwriter before turning to large-scale mural work in the late 1990s.

In 1998, Lattimer completed Life Savers, a 35 × 8 m depiction of Opunake's surf-lifesaving culture painted on concrete block in the central business district. Between 1998 and 2002, he produced the ten-panel Reflections of Ōpunake cycle, charting Ōpunake's history from 1900 to 2000. His 2012 mural, Pharmacies Thru the Ages, portrays Ōpunake's three long-serving chemists and was unveiled on Tasman Street after 19 working days of painting. In the same year, Lattimer was commissioned by the Paihia Phantom Placemakers to create a jigsaw-style mural narrating the history of Paihia, Bay of Islands.

The Paihia project and the Ōpunake pharmacy mural jointly earned Lattimer the Resene Mural Masterpieces national award for best community mural in 2012.

Lattimer died at his home in Coopers Beach, on 1 July 2025, at the age of 79.

=== Selected murals ===
Year	Title	Location	Notes
1998	Life Savers	CBD, Ōpunake	35 m × 8 m acrylic wall mural.
2000-02	Reflections of Ōpunake	Egmont St, Ōpunake	Ten-panel historical sequence commissioned by Egmont Community Arts Council.
2012	Pharmacies Thru the Ages	Tasman St, Ōpunake	Portrait triptych of Feaver and Cavaney family chemists.
2012	Paihia History Mural	Village Green, Paihia	Multi-panel jigsaw mural tracing Bay of Islands history.

== Publications ==
- Lattimer, Dennis (2003). A Day at the Races. Christchurch: RandNZ. ISBN 978-0-473-09792-9. A cartoon collection written and illustrated by Lattimer.
