= Miles Gregory =

New Zealand / UK director and producer

Miles Gregory MNZM
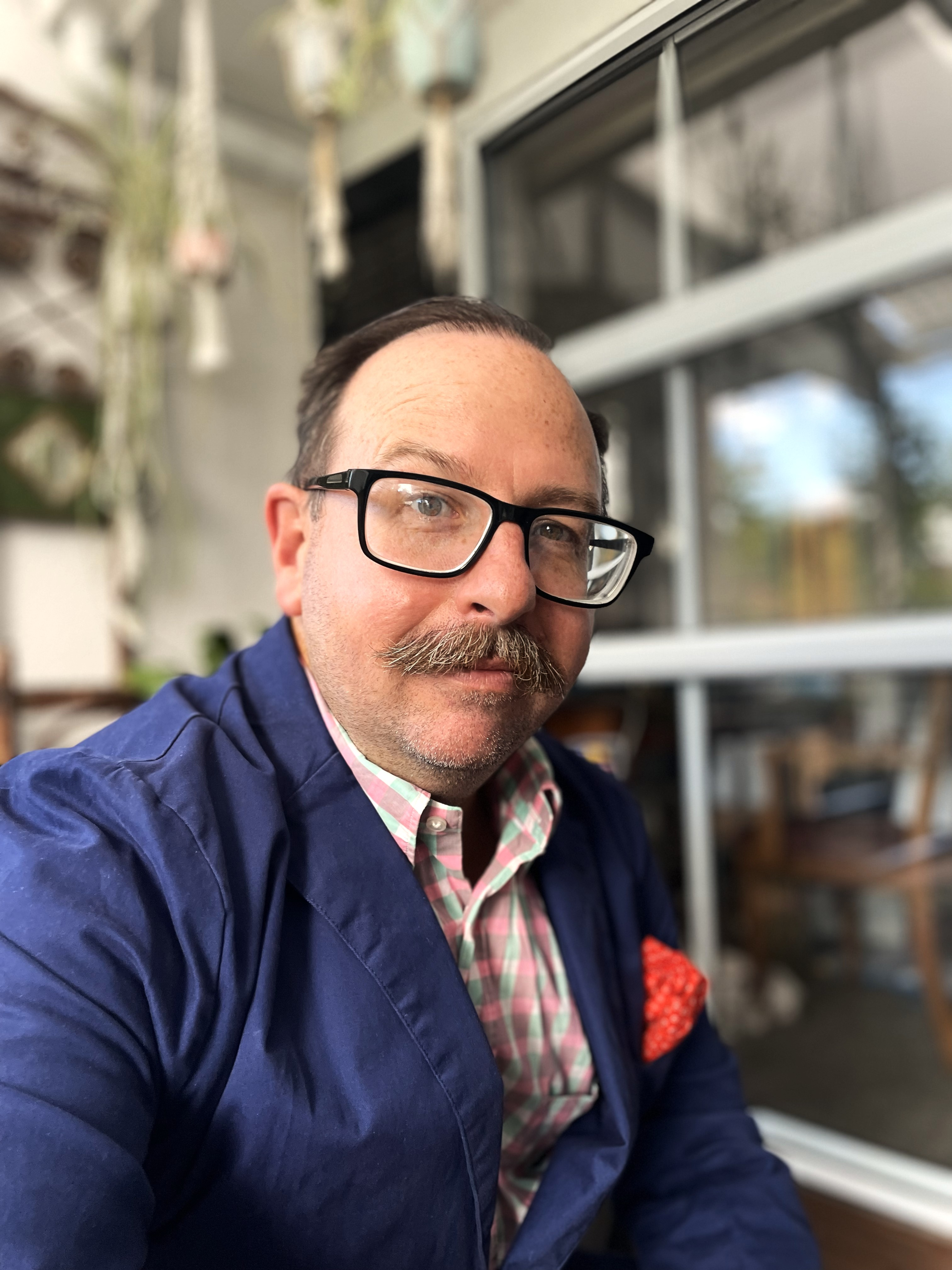
- Miles Gregory in 2025
- Born: 1977 (age 48–49); Wellington, New Zealand
- Occupations: Theatre producer; Theatre director
- Years active: 2000–present
- Spouse: Bob Capocci
- Relatives: Trish Gregory (mother); Dennis Lattimer (uncle)
- Awards: Member of the New Zealand Order of Merit (2026); Denizen Hero Award (2016); Sir Peter Blake Leader Award (2018)

Miles Richard James Lattimer-Gregory MNZM (known professionally as Miles Gregory) is a New Zealand and British theatre director, theatrical producer and arts entrepreneur. He is best known as the founder and former Artistic Director of Pop-up Globe (2015–2020), a full-scale temporary reconstruction of Shakespeare's second Globe Theatre.

He has directed over fifty professional Shakespeare productions internationally. In 2023, he co-founded HyperCinema, a company developing personalised entertainment using generative artificial intelligence.

== Early life and education ==
Miles Gregory was born in Wellington, New Zealand, and educated at King's College, Auckland. He read Modern History at Durham University (University College), completed an MFA in Staging Shakespeare at the University of Exeter, and earned a PhD in Shakespeare in Performance from the University of Bristol.

== Career ==
=== United Kingdom ===
Gregory began his career in the United Kingdom, founding the British Touring Shakespeare Company in 2000 and the Bristol Shakespeare Festival in 2003. He directed productions in the West End at the Westminster Theatre and served from 2008 to 2011 as Artistic Director and CEO of The Maltings Theatre & Cinema, Berwick-upon-Tweed, where he oversaw a financial and audience turnaround. He served as a visiting lecturer on the MA Acting programme at the Royal Central School of Speech and Drama in London from 2008 to 2010.

=== Pop-up Globe ===
In 2015, Gregory founded Pop-up Globe, a full-scale temporary reconstruction of Shakespeare’s second Globe Theatre, which opened in Auckland, in February 2016. The project staged Shakespearean productions using original practices such as universal lighting, audience interaction, and period-inspired architecture.

The theatre's design was based on research into the second Globe by Professor Tim Fitzpatrick of the University of Sydney, whose reconstruction drew on seventeenth-century visual evidence and archaeological findings.

Across five Auckland seasons, a New Zealand national tour and three Australian seasons in Melbourne, Sydney and Perth, the company attracted more than 750,000 attendees.

The company's education programme brought Shakespeare to approximately 60,000 New Zealand schoolchildren, and its productions engaged more than 600 professional actors and production staff.

Productions directed by Gregory included Twelfth Night (2016), Henry V (2017), A Midsummer Night’s Dream (2018), Richard III (2018), Measure for Measure (2019) and Romeo & Juliet (2020). His multi-award-winning bi-lingual 2018 Dream production, incorporating Māori language and performance traditions, was recognised for its cultural integration and theatrical innovation. The company ceased operations in 2020 due to the COVID-19 pandemic.

Pop-up Globe won Best Regional Event of the Year at the New Zealand Event Awards in both 2016 and 2017. At the 2018 BroadwayWorld Sydney Awards, announced in January 2019, its productions A Midsummer Night's Dream and The Merchant of Venice won eight awards, including Best Play for A Midsummer Night's Dream, Best Director of a Play for Gregory, and awards for acting, choreography and costume design. Pop-up Globe also won the People's Choice award for Best New Event in Sydney at Concrete Playground's Best of 2018 Awards.

=== HyperCinema ===
In 2023, Gregory co-founded HyperCinema, a digital storytelling company creating personalised live performance with artificial intelligence. Its first public production, Enter the Multiverse, opened in Auckland at a pop-up location on Queen Street in September 2023.

In 2023, Gregory published The HyperCinema Manifesto: A New Entertainment Format, outlining his conception of live digital storytelling in which audience members become protagonists in narratives generated for them through artificial intelligence.

The second public installation, Game On!, launched in 2024 at the College Football Hall of Fame in Atlanta in partnership with Microsoft. Gregory served as AI Creative Director for the project, which incorporated visitors' likenesses into personalised images, videos and narratives throughout the museum. In 2025, Game On! won the Best Use of AI category at PhotoShelter's Storyteller Awards.

== Publications ==
- Gregory, M. (2025). Bloody Good Shakespeare. Auckland: Henslowe Irving Press. ISBN 978-0-473-74491-5.
- Gregory, M., & Fitzpatrick, T. (2023). "The Pop-up Globe: Designing and Learning to Play an ‘Empathy Drum’." In Semler, L.E., Hansen, C., & Manuel, J. (Eds.), Reimagining Shakespeare Education: Teaching and Learning through Collaboration. Cambridge University Press. ISBN 9781108478670.
- Gregory, M. (2008). "Cowboys and Romans: Cymbeline and paradigmatic change in the theatre, 1987–2006." In Orford, P. (Ed.), Divining Thoughts: Future Directions in Shakespeare Studies. Cambridge Scholars Publishing. ISBN 978-1-84718-379-8.

== Honours and awards ==
- Sir Peter Blake Leader Award, 2018
- BroadwayWorld Sydney Best Director Award for A Midsummer Night’s Dream, 2018
- Denizen Heroes Award for Contribution to the Arts, 2016

In the 2026 King’s Birthday Honours, Gregory was appointed a Member of the New Zealand Order of Merit, for services to theatre.

== Selected credits ==
- Hamlet, director, Westminster Theatre, London, 2002
- Twelfth Night, director, Westminster Theatre, 2002
- The Lifeblood, director, Barons Court Theatre, 2002
- Henry V, director, Shaw Theatre, London & Palace Theatre Westcliff, 2002
- Romeo & Juliet, director, Shaw Theatre & Palace Theatre, 2002
- Chair, The Husband (actor), Punchdrunk, Old Seager Distillery, London, 2002
- The Marowitz Hamlet, director, Wickham Theatre, Bristol, 2004
- Much Ado About Nothing, director, Queen Square, Bristol, 2004
- Charley's Aunt, director, Queen Square, 2005
- Twelfth Night, director, Pop-up Globe Auckland, 2016
- Henry V, director, Pop-up Globe Auckland & Melbourne, 2017–18
- A Midsummer Night's Dream, director, Pop-up Globe Auckland, Sydney & Perth, 2017–19
- The Comedy of Errors, director, Pop-up Globe & Sydney, 2018
- Richard III, director, Pop-up Globe Auckland, 2018
- Twelfth Night, director, Pop-up Globe Perth, 2019
- Measure for Measure, director, Pop-up Globe Auckland, NZ National Tour, Pop-up Globe Perth, 2019
- Romeo and Juliet, director, Pop-up Globe, 2020
- Enter the Multiverse, creative director, HyperCinema, Queen Street Auckland, 2023
- Game On!, creative director, HyperCinema, College Football Hall of Fame, Atlanta, 2024

== Personal life ==
Gregory is the son of New Zealand fashion designer Trish Gregory and the nephew of New Zealand mural artist Dennis Lattimer. He is married to costume designer Bob Capocci, who served as Head of Costume at Pop-up Globe. Together they have collaborated on numerous productions, including A Midsummer Night’s Dream, Henry V, and The Comedy of Errors.
