= Trish Gregory =

New Zealand fashion designer and businesswoman

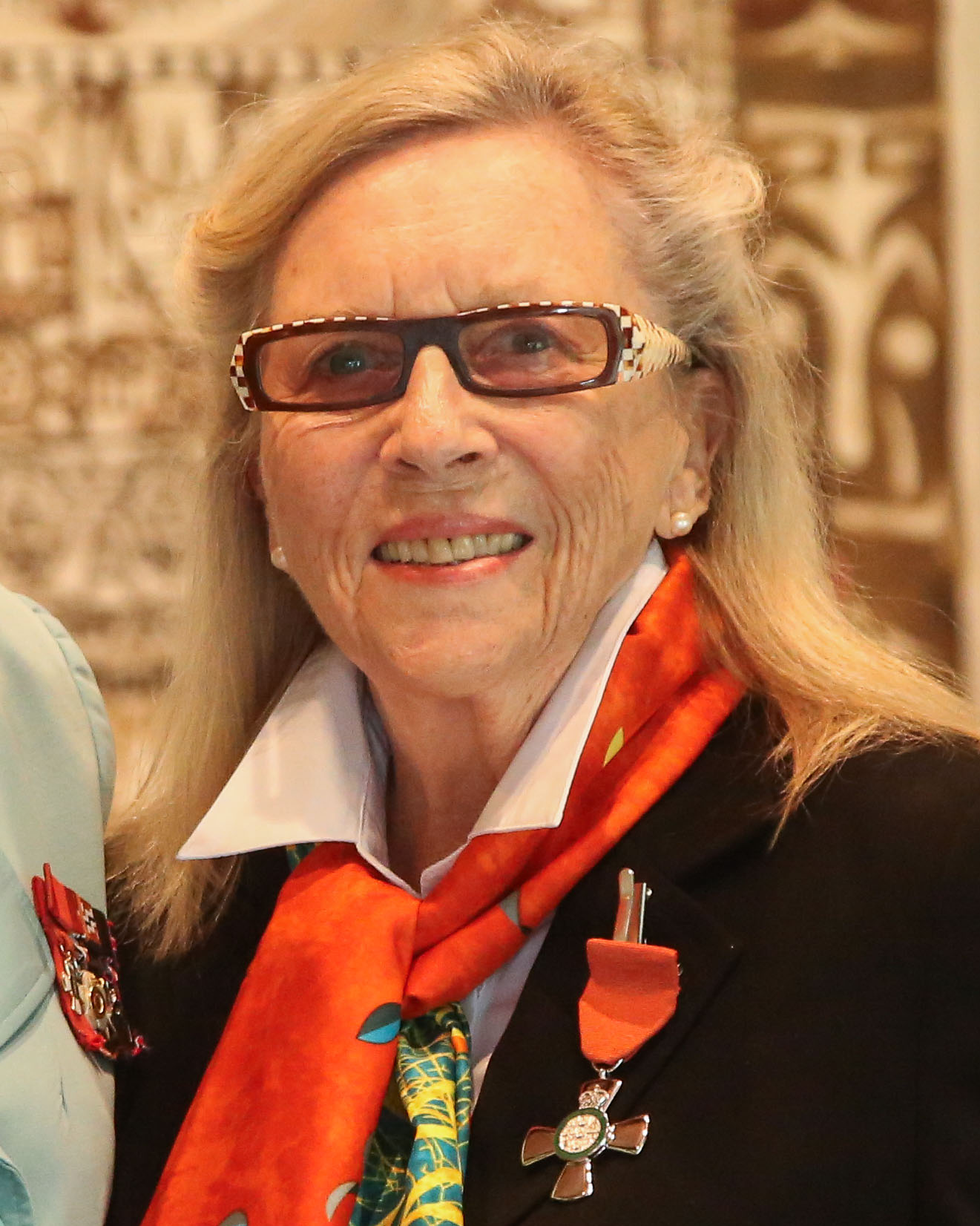
- Gregory in 2025
- Born: Patricia Pearl Lattimer; New Plymouth, New Zealand
- Occupation: Fashion designer
- Spouse: James Gregory
- Relatives: Miles Gregory (son); Dennis Lattimer (brother)
- Writing career
- Period: 1968–present
- Notable awards: New Zealand Benson & Hedges Fashion Design Merit Award (1970, 1972); New Zealand Benson & Hedges Fashion Design Award (1973, 1974); Queen Elizabeth II Arts Council Award (1974); New Zealand Industrial Design Council, 'Designmark' Award (1986)

Patricia Pearl Gregory MNZM (née Lattimer) is a New Zealand fashion designer and businesswoman, who achieved widespread recognition as one of New Zealand's leading and innovative designers in a career spanning half a century.

== Early life ==
Gregory was born Patricia Pearl Lattimer in New Plymouth, New Zealand, and educated at New Plymouth Girls' High School.

== Career ==
After travelling internationally for several years working as a secretary and architectural draftswoman, Gregory returned to New Zealand joining the New Zealand Broadcasting Corporation (NZBC) as a copywriter.

In 1968 an NZBC posting took her to Timaru in the South Island and a year later she opened a fashion boutique named "The Fig Leaf" on Caroline Bay Hill.

In 1970 Gregory entered the New Zealand Benson and Hedges Fashion Design Awards for the first time, winning the Merit Award in the Evening Wear category.

Gregory, displaying "a flair for inventiveness" designed "Splatadashes" and in 1971 was described as having "put Timaru on the map as a launching pad for fashion trends”. The "revolutionary boots in two parts could be worn over an ordinary pair of shoes" and were sold at Auckland department stores Milne & Choyce and the D.I.C.

Gregory entered the New Zealand Benson and Hedges Fashion Design Awards again in 1972, winning the Merit Award in the High Fashion Daywear category.

In 1973, Gregory took the top award for High Fashion Daywear in the New Zealand Benson and Hedges Fashion Design Awards with her design 'Flappers'. It was reported that Gregory's entry "showed the signature of a really creative designer who has what the Americans call 'class'". Gregory was described as producing “creative design that has all the smooth professionalism of an international couturier” and that her entry “was unmistakably a winner [...] she has produced a design that, if it were commercially exploited, could well be a trend-setter”.

Gregory “scooped another major award” in 1974 winning the NZ Benson & Hedges top award for High Fashion Daywear. It was noted that Gregory “has consistently been to the fore in New Zealand fashion design over the last four or five years”.

In the same year, Gregory was awarded a Queen Elizabeth II Arts Council Award to study in Europe, becoming the first fashion designer in New Zealand to be chosen for this award.

In 1975 Gregory was accepted as an Honorary student at the Royal College of Art School of Fashion Design in South Kensington, London.

Following her studies at the Royal College of Art, Gregory worked with European fashion house Zoe in Ibiza, Spain returning each winter for the next five years to design the summer collection.

In 1976, inspired by her overseas studies, including work experience in the Fashion Department of Vogue magazine London, and the International Wool Secretariat, London, Gregory returned to Wellington, New Zealand, with a plan to bring professionally designed high fashion garments to the New Zealand market in deconstructed form.

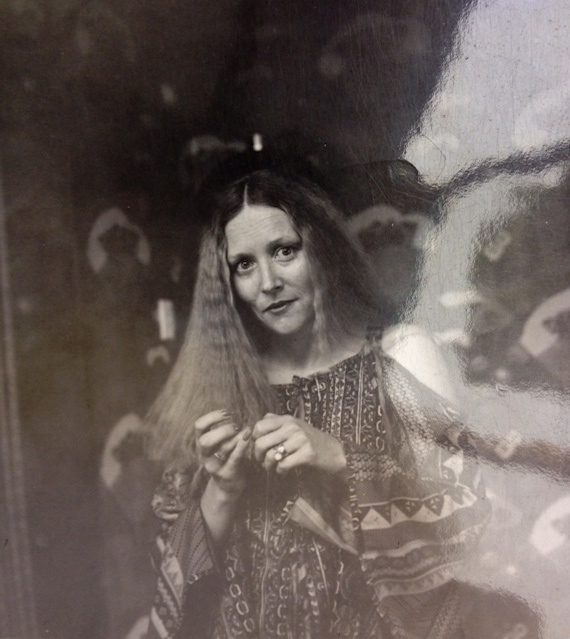
Gregory in 1977

Ready cut to sew "Kitset Clothes" (later "Designer Fashion Kits") entered the market initially via retail in 1977. Their unique design, featuring no zips, buttonholes, darts, linings, interfacings or hand sewing, meant they could be easily constructed at home following a simple instruction sheet.

In 1978 Gregory formed Trish Gregory Fashions (NZ) Ltd., and leased factory space in Wellington. Impatient to expose this new idea to a wider market, Gregory decided to by-pass retail and take the product direct to the consumer. Fashion consultants were hired and trained to present intimate fashion shows to invited guests in private homes. Afterwards, guests could try on a garment and purchase exactly the same item in kit form. This became the framework of the Trish Gregory selling method.

In 1979 the company moved to Auckland and started expanding its sales force by hiring area managers throughout New Zealand.

By 1985, Gregory's Designer Fashion Kits were a household name and creating work for around three hundred women making it the largest all-women company in New Zealand.

Later that year David Caygill, Minister of Trade and Industry, presented Trish Gregory Fashions (NZ) Ltd., with the New Zealand Industrial Design Council's 'Designmark' Award for excellence of the company's innovative products and systems. This marked the first time the award had been presented to a clothing manufacturer. The Designmark evaluators reported “the Kit System Concept, presentation and professional distribution plan were all impressive indeed”. It was reported that Gregory's Designer Fashion Kits concept “carries all the hallmarks set by the European, English and American designers, translated for New Zealand lifestyles by the imagination of one very talented New Zealand woman”.

In the same year the company expanded into Australia, adding a small collection of knitwear and ready to wear garments to co-ordinate with the kitset collections.

In 1986 Gregory was one of four judges on the panel of "Flying Start", an ITV Independent Television New Zealand series showcasing young New Zealand entrepreneurs.

The same year Gregory was appointed Design Consultant for the marine clothing manufacturer Line 7 Ltd., and designed the graphics on the Line 7 wet weather gear worn on board Kiwi Magic KZ7 in the 1987 America's Cup Race in Fremantle.

By 1988, the first 'Trish Gregory' retail store had opened in Queen Street, Auckland, stocking 'Trish Gregory' ready to wear collections and knitwear along with the company's 'Jacketmaker' label. Four more stores were opened in Auckland, Wellington and Christchurch.

In 1992, appointed a judge for the Benson and Hedges Fashion Design Awards, Gregory recommended the High Fashion Daywear Award be replaced with a “collection of three garments” to “bring a long needed commercial aspect into the awards”. Gregory noted “commercial designers wanting to work in the disciplined area of mass market must have the ability to think in terms of collections, stories and groups rather than individual one-off creations.”

In the same year Gregory was invited to design a collection for the Fashion Quarterly “Corbans' Collections” which showcased New Zealand's top fashion designers.

Since the late 1990s Gregory has been involved in the tourist industry designing luxury textile products including Possum/Merino collections for New Zealand manufacturers both for domestic and export markets, and 'Trish Gregory' Cashmere and Fine Merino collections.

Since 2008, garments designed by Trish Gregory have been held at the National Museum of New Zealand, Te Papa Tongarewa.

== Personal life ==
Trish Gregory is married to James Gregory. They have one son, Dr Miles Gregory, the founder and artistic director of Pop-up Globe.

== Awards ==
- 1970 New Zealand Benson & Hedges Fashion Design Merit Award
- 1972 New Zealand Benson & Hedges Fashion Design Merit Award
- 1973 New Zealand Benson & Hedges Fashion Design Award Winner
- 1974 New Zealand Benson & Hedges Fashion Design Award Winner
- 1974 Queen Elizabeth II Arts Council Award
- 1986 New Zealand Industrial Design Council, 'Designmark' Award
- 2025 Member of the New Zealand Order of Merit

== Honours ==
In the 2025 King's Birthday Honours, Gregory was appointed a Member of the New Zealand Order of Merit, for services to the fashion industry.
