= Khyla Russell =

New Zealand academic

Academic background
- Education: Massey University
- Alma mater: University of Otago
- Thesis: Landscape: Perceptions of Kai Tahu I Mua, Āianei, Ā Muri Ake (2001)
- Doctoral advisor: Jacqui Leckie, Jim Williams and Ian Barber

Khyla J. Russell is a New Zealand academic. She was appointed full professor at Otago Polytechnic on 1 February 2012 and emeritus professor at the same institution in March 2016.

== Academic career ==
Russell has a BA from Massey University and graduated in 2001 from the University of Otago with a PhD in Anthropology, Landscape: perceptions of Kai Tahu I Mua, Āianei, Ā Muri Ake.

She was appointed Kaitohutohu (Deputy Chief Executive Māori Development) at Otago Polytechnic in 2005 and in 2012 she became only the second person to be named full professor of that institution, the first being Leoni Schmidt. In 2016 she was the first academic to be named an emeritus professor there.

Russell was selected as one of ten Māori women leaders interviewed for the 2011 New Zealand Families Commission report, Mātiro whakamua: Looking over the horizon: Interviews with 10 Māori leaders.

== Public outreach ==
Russell gave a keynote address in September 2020 at a symposium on the ways art reflects how people learn to live and act in the changing environment.

== Personal life ==
Russell is Māori of Kāi Tahu, Kāti Māmoe, Waitaha, Rapuwai descent. She received her tā moko, Māori tattoo in 2001.

== Selected works ==
=== Book ===
- Bennett, Judith A.; Russell, Khyla J. (2003), Journeys In A Small Canoe: The Life And Times Of Lloyd Maepeza Gina, Pandanus Books, ISBN 978-1-74076-064-5

=== Journal articles ===
- Hudson, M. & Russell, K. (2009). "The Treaty of Waitangi and Research Ethics in Aotearoa." Journal of Bioethical Inquiry, Vol. 6., No. 1. 61–68.
- Russell, K. (2006). "Landscape: Perceptions of Kai Tahu I mua, aianei, a muri ake." Spasifika, Issue 12. 72–73.
- Russell, K. (2005). "Movements. Junctures: The Journal for Thematic Dialogue," ISBN 1-877139-65-3. 04: Movement, June. 11–12.
