= Benson & Hedges Fashion Design Awards =

Benson & Hedges Fashion Design Awards was a New Zealand fashion competition that ran from 1964 to 1998. It was the country's major competitive fashion event during this period. The Awards' open entry format offered an opportunity for new fashion designers and manufacturers to showcase their work on a national platform. Prominent New Zealand fashion designers showcased their works at this event including Annie Bonza, Trish Gregory, Denise L'Estrange-Corbet and Isabelle Harris.

== History ==
The first awards ceremony was held on 29 July 1964 during Wellington's Majestic Cabaret. It was originally called the Wills Gold Rose Awards but became the Benson and Hedges Fashion Design Awards after a change in sponsor. Jeannie Gandar, president of the New Zealand Modelling Association, organised the first event which was hosted by Graham Kerr. The first two award categories were High Fashion Day wear and Formal Evening wear, but these categories later expanded as the event increased in size.

The awards continued to be hosted in Wellington for the duration of their existence. Josephine Brodie co-ordinated the event until 1982 when Maysie Bestall-Cohen took over the organisation. The event had been televised since its inception but in 1984 this became a live broadcast, making the event one of the largest outside broadcasts of its kind. The show however was renamed Smokefree Fashion Design Awards in the late 1990s after tobacco sponsorship was banned.

== Award categories ==
Changes in award categories marked the rise and fall of fashion trends in New Zealand as well as an increased recognition of Māori and Pacific influences on fashion design. Over the period in which the event occurred there was a notable transition away from mimicking European fashion trends to New Zealand fashion gaining its own distinctive influence and identity.

Specialist categories fluctuated with the rise and fall of certain trends in New Zealand. These included the Leather Industry Award and the Wool Growers Award.

== See also ==
- New Zealand Fashion Museum
- List of fashion awards
