= New Zealand Fashion Museum =

Museum of fashion

- Established: 2010
- Location: New Zealand
- Director: Doris de Pont
- Website: Official website

The New Zealand Fashion Museum is a virtual fashion museum in New Zealand established in 2010. It was the brainchild of fashion designer and fashion historian Doris de Pont. Established as a charitable trust in January 2010, the museum holds "pop-up" exhibitions around New Zealand and runs as an online museum. It draws from public and private collections to pull together its exhibitions, featuring designers such as Liz Findlay and Margi Robertson.

The museum's first pop-up exhibition, Looking Terrific – the Story of El Jay, was curated by Doris de Pont. It showcased over 50 vintage garments by New Zealand fashion industry leader Gus Fisher and his label El Jay. The Auckland exhibition was held at the Gus Fisher Gallery. The Wellington season was hosted by Kirkcaldie and Stains, which welcomed the clothes back into its store as stockists of El Jay during its 50-year history.

In 2018, the museum curated and presented a century of summer fashion.

In 2019, the museum curated Moana Currents: Dressing Aotearoa Now in partnership with Te Uru Waitakere Contemporary Gallery in Titirangi.

== See also ==
- List of museums in New Zealand
