= Maysie Bestall-Cohen =

New Zealand model (born 1945)

Maysie Bestall-Cohen (born 1945) is a New Zealand retired model and modelling agent and the former organiser and presenter of the Benson & Hedges Fashion Design Awards.

== Early life ==
Bestall-Cohen grew up in Dublin, Ireland, where her father was a children's clothing manufacturer. When she was 16, the family moved to New Zealand and settled in Auckland. She attended secretarial college there, and was invited to join a modelling agency by two women she met a party, Winsome Goudie and Mary Bourne.

== Career ==
Bestall-Cohen's early modelling career included work for the New Zealand Wool Board, Rose Coats, Catalina swimwear and she appeared on the covers of Eve, Thursday and New Zealand Woman’s Weekly magazines as well as in the Auckland Star and the New Zealand Herald newspapers. She also worked part time in reception and typing positions, such as for photographer Clifton Firth, fashion company Voyageur International and the ANZ Bank.

In 1968 Bestall-Cohen and her husband purchased the June Dally Watkins Deportment School and Model Agency and developed a promotions company to work together with it. The following year Bestall-Cohen began organising and presenting fashion shows—the first one she managed was for department store Milne & Choyce—which she continued to do up until the late 1980s. From 1982 to 1988, she organised the annual Benson & Hedges Fashion Design Awards.

In 1999 Bestall-Cohen moved to Queensland and in 2005 set up a womenswear company, Ananda, and opened a boutique in Noosa.

=== Recognition ===
In 2000, Bestall-Cohen received an honorary Bachelor of Arts degree in Fashion Technology from the Auckland University of Technology.
