= Niue International Airport =

Airport in Niue

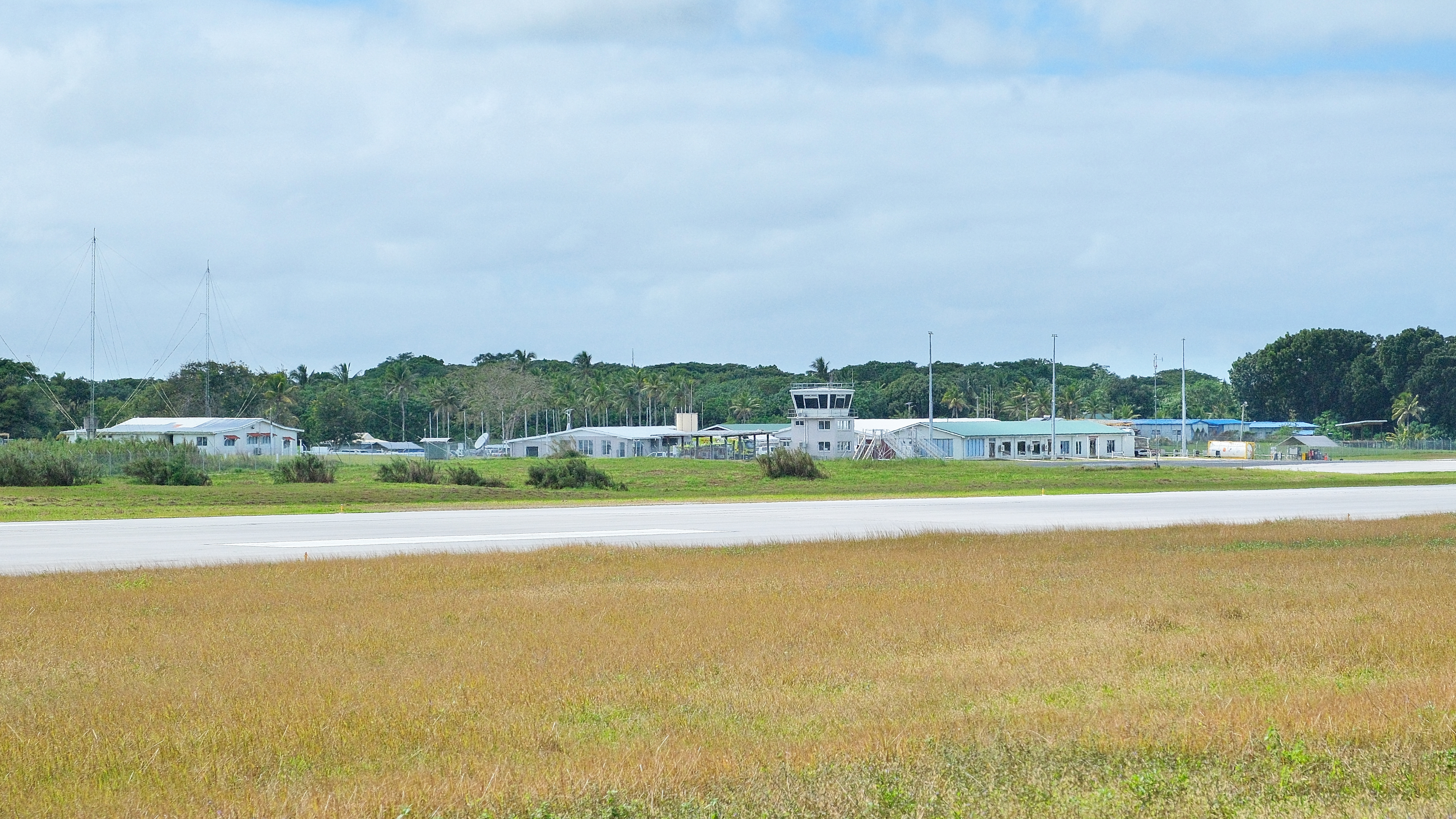
- Entrance to Niue International Airport
- IATA: IUE; ICAO: NIUE

Summary
- Airport type: Public
- Location: Niue
- Elevation AMSL: 209 ft (64 m)
- Coordinates: 19°04′44″S 169°55′33″W

Map
- Location of airport in Niue

Runways
Direction	Length		Surface
Direction	ft	m	Surface
10/28	7,660	2,335	Asphalt

Niue International Airport (IATA: IUE, ICAO: NIUE), also known as Hanan International Airport, is an international airport serving the island nation of Niue. It is located near the town of Alofi, and is only used by Air New Zealand, flying to and from Auckland twice a week, departing from Auckland on Tuesdays and Saturdays, and departing from Niue on Mondays and Fridays. (Note: Because New Zealand and Niue are on opposite sides of the International Date Line, the Tuesday morning flight from Auckland arrives in Niue on Monday, and then departs a few hours later, arriving back in Auckland on Tuesday evening. Similarly, the Saturday morning flight from Auckland arrives in Niue on Friday, and then departs a few hours later, arriving back in Auckland on Saturday evening.)

Plans for an airfield on Niue were initially proposed in 1947, but were not advanced. In 1964, the Niue Assembly asked the New Zealand government to construct an airport, and a site was surveyed. Originally an emergency airfield was planned, but following the survey the plans were upgraded to a full airfield capable of handling turboprop airliners. Construction would be carried out by the New Zealand Army. Construction began in 1968, with New Zealand Ministry of Works staff overseeing Niuean workers from the Department of Public Works. Funding was provided by the New Zealand government. The airport initially had a 5,400 foot sealed runway.

The airport received its first flight in December 1970, and its first commercial passengers in July 1971. It was formally opened in November 1971. It was initially served by Polynesian Airlines Hawker Siddeley HS 748s and Fokker F.27 Friendship aircraft from Fiji, but no direct flights from New Zealand. The runway was upgraded in 1981, with direct flights to Auckland using Boeing 737s beginning that year. From 1990 to 1992, it served as the base of the now-defunct Niue Airline.

The airport is named after Ralph Hanan, who was formerly a New Zealand Minister of Island Affairs.

== Airline and destination ==
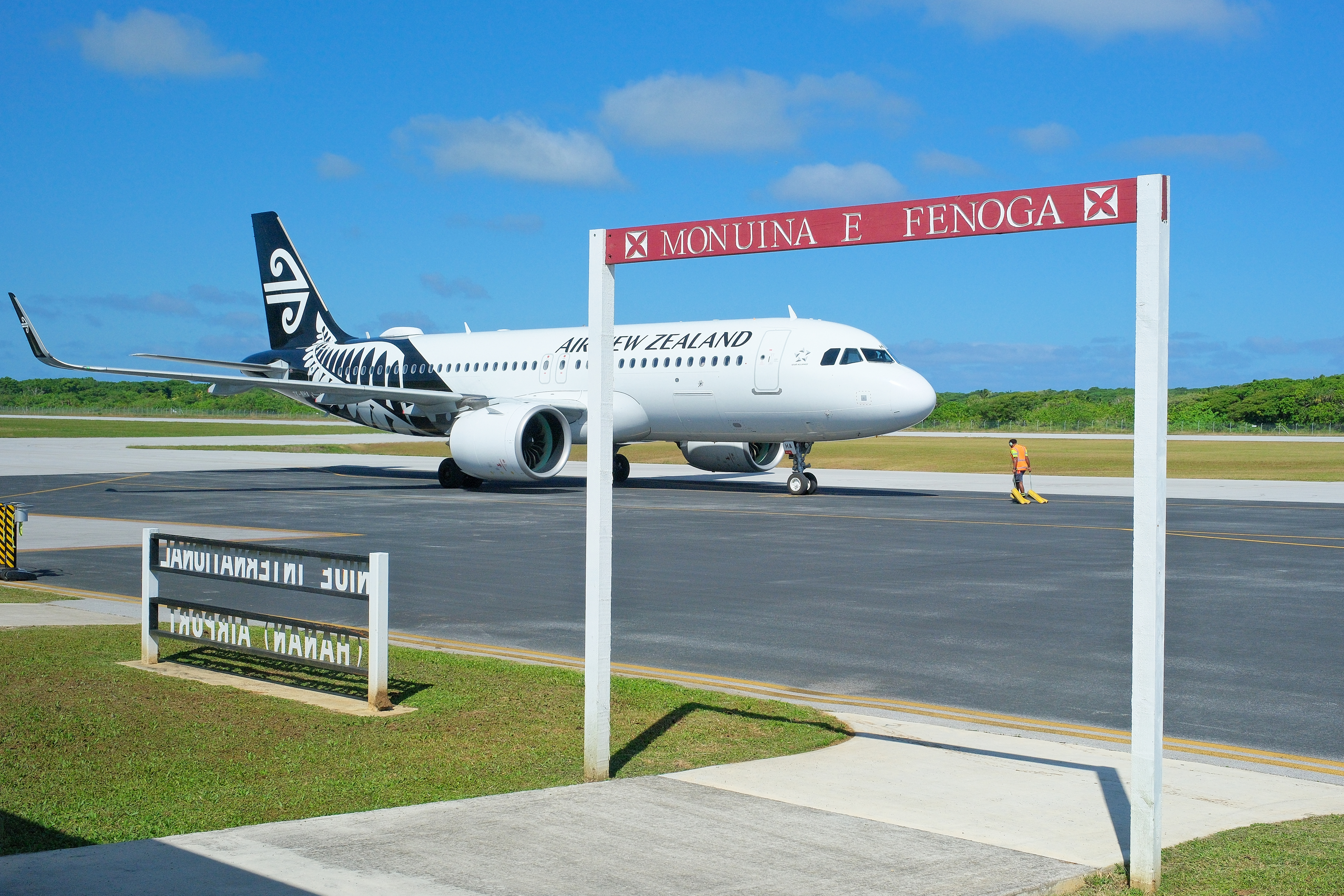
Air New Zealand plane on the Niue runway

Air New Zealand connects Niue Airport to Auckland International Airport in New Zealand.
