= Leoni Schmidt =

South African-born New Zealand art historian and academic

- Awards: International Arts in Society Award for Excellence in the Field of the Arts, 2008; Award for Sustained Excellence in Tertiary Teaching, 2011

Academic background
- Education: University of South Africa; University of the Witwatersrand
- Alma mater: University of Johannesburg
- Thesis: Koordinate in die visuele vorm en betekenis van die skilderkuns in die moderne tyd (Coordinates in the visual form and meaning of painting in the modern era). (1982)
- Doctoral advisor: Professor Peter Engel

Academic work
- Discipline: Art history and theory
- Institutions: Otago Polytechnic
- Doctoral students: Caroline McCaw

Leoni Schmidt is a South African-born New Zealand art historian and full professor in and previous Head of the Dunedin School of Art and Director of Research and Postgraduate Studies at the Otago Polytechnic and Deputy Chief Executive (Academic) at Otago Polytechnic Auckland International Campus in New Zealand.

Leoni has supervised and assessed many postgraduate students up to the Master's level in the Dunedin School of Art and other universities and polytechnics, and doctoral candidates at other institutions. She also mentors candidates in Otago Polytechnic's Doctorate of Professional Practice programme.

== Academic career ==
Schmidt studied fine arts and graduated with a BA (Fine Arts) from the University of South Africa and an MA (Fine Arts) from the University of the Witwatersrand in 1976. At the University of Johannesburg she completed a D Litt et Phil in 1982. Schmidt worked as a senior lecturer in South Africa before moving to New Zealand to teach at Otago Polytechnic in 1996. She was the first person to be appointed full professor at Otago Polytechnic when head of the Dunedin School of Art. One of Schmidt's doctoral students is Professor Caro McCaw.

In 2008 Schmidt was awarded the International Arts in Society Award for Excellence in the Field of the Arts.

In 2011 Schmidt won an Ako Aotearoa Award for Sustained Excellence in Tertiary Teaching.
