= Gus Fisher Gallery =

Art gallery in Auckland, New Zealand

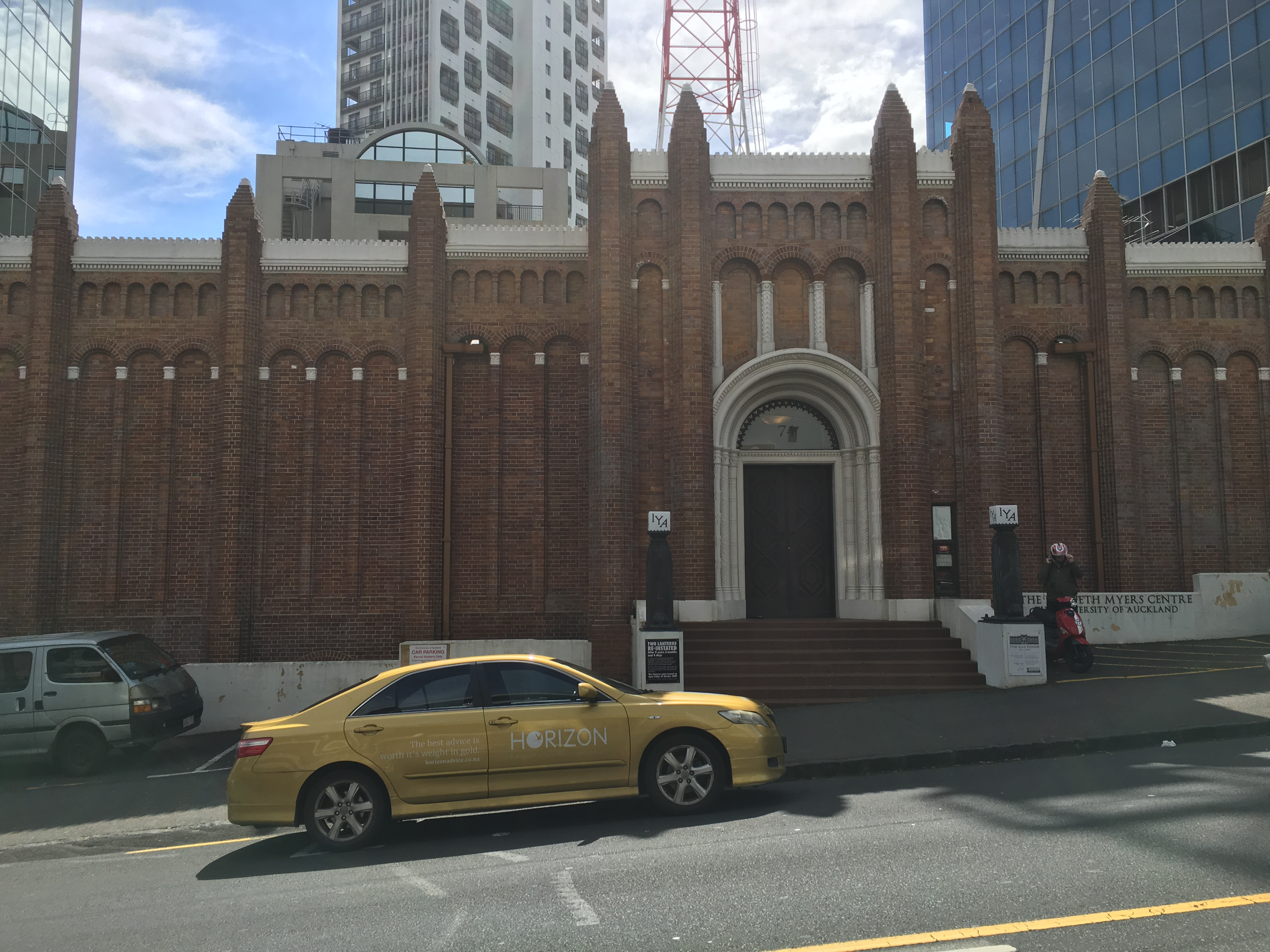
- Gus Fisher Gallery is located in the historic Kenneth Myers Centre

General information
- Type: Art Gallery
- Architectural style: Neo-Romanesque, Art Deco
- Location: 74 Shortland Street, Auckland, New Zealand
- Coordinates: 36.84668985945163°S 174.76936314184553°E

Design and construction
- Architects: Wade & Bartley

Website
- https://gusfishergallery.auckland.ac.nz

Gus Fisher Gallery is a contemporary art gallery owned and operated by the University of Auckland in Auckland, New Zealand. It is located in the Kenneth Myers Centre, a historic building restored in 2000 with the help of the gallery's patron, Gus Fisher (1920–2010). The gallery exhibits a regular programme of socially engaged exhibitions that showcase international and local artists, and an extensive public programme including performances, film screenings, workshops, panel discussions and family activities.

Gus Fisher Gallery opened in 2001 as a venue for the first Auckland Triennial, led by inaugural Director Robin Stoney. From 2006 to 2017, it was operated by the University of Auckland Centre for Art Research, which was established in 2006 to support and develop the academic and research activities connected with Gus Fisher Gallery, The University of Auckland Art Collection, and Window, and was led by Director, Linda Tyler. The gallery aimed to present a balanced and relevant programme of curated exhibitions of contemporary and historical art, which interrogates current visual arts knowledge nationally and internationally.

In 2008, Gus Fisher Gallery was awarded Metro Magazine's Best Arts Institution in Auckland, from their annual Best of Auckland Issue.

In 2018, Gus Fisher Gallery shifted its focus to contemporary art exhibitions with an emphasis on film and video work, reflecting the building's heritage as broadcasting studios. The gallery closed in September 2018 and reopened at the beginning of April 2019, having undergone refurbishments.

Gus Fisher Gallery is open Tuesday to Friday, 10am – 5pm, and Saturday 12pm - 4pm. Entry is always free.

== Centre for Art Research (2006–2017) ==
The University of Auckland Centre for Art Research developed, supported and promoted scholarship, learning, and community engagement in the visual arts. It was an important platform for research at The University of Auckland and provided a public interface for engagement with the wider Auckland and New Zealand communities.

Established in 2006, the centre was entrusted to manage and develop the university's extensive and valuable art collection, to coordinate the busy exhibition programme of Gus Fisher Gallery, and to support and guide the student team that leads the activities of the online and onsite student-curated gallery, Window. The centre also liaised closely with those other parts of the university engaged in similar or complementary activities with a view to maximising opportunities to profile key initiatives. The centre was originally named the Centre for New Zealand Art Research and Discovery (CNZARD) but was renamed the Centre for Art Research in 2012.

In 2017 the Centre for Art Research was disestablished. Operation of the University of Auckland Art Collection, and Window gallery was transferred to The University of Auckland's Libraries and Learning Services.
