= National Security Investigations Team (New Zealand) =

The National Security Investigations Team (NSIT), known as the Special Investigation Group (SIG) prior to 2016, is a New Zealand government group that focuses on threats to national security, formed in response to the September 11 attacks. It is part of the New Zealand Police, with four NSIT teams in regional centres around the country.

== History ==
=== As the Special Investigation Group ===
Funding for the group was announced in 2004 and the group was formed in 2005. The formation of a central Strategic Intelligence Unit was approved by the New Zealand government as early as January 2002. The group was formed 'to focus on terrorism threats to national security' in response to September 11 terrorist attacks. SIG appears to be operated by New Zealand police in connection with the New Zealand Defence Force, Security Intelligence Service (SIS) and Government Communications Security Bureau (GCSB). The group reportedly has teams in Auckland, Wellington and Christchurch. An intelligence unit and a special tactics group was formed by police in 2002 to look into terrorism, at the same time as the SIS budget increased markedly and when Jon White was made Assistant Commissioner of Counter Terrorism.

=== As the National Security Investigations Team ===
In 2016, the SIG was restructured and renamed the National Security Investigations Team, with an additional group added. Public information on the team under its new name was first released as part of the Royal Commission of Inquiry into the Terrorist Attack on Christchurch Mosques on 15 March 2019. The inquiry revealed that the responsibility for investigating right-wing terrorism fell under the remit of the NSIT, however the team's workload was considered too high, making early intervention and risk reduction difficult, and creating inconsistent outcomes.

At the time, the team's role included training regular officers to spot and intervene in cases of violent extremism, as well as drawing on regular police resources to conduct investigations. However other police staff described the NSIT as operating in an isolated manner, not integrated into police districts. A 2015 review recommended that a "New Zealand Police national prevention coordinator" be hired to better integrate the NSIT into districts, but this review was ignored until after March 15, 2019. 3 out of 4 NSIT groups had an embedded intelligence analyst, with the Christchurch group only gaining one after March 15.

The NSIT describes itself as "threat agnostic," meaning the ideology behind threats does not factor into risk assessments. However prior to March 15, 2019, the NSIT was mainly focused on combatting islamic terrorism through relationships with ethnic liaison officers, and contact with mosques. This also involved following leads from regular police, of which there were a greater number relating to Muslim communities than to right wing extremism, however the NSIT did not have standardised criteria for following leads.

== Controversy ==
=== Rob Gilchrist spying incidents ===
The National Security Investigations Team, then known as the Special Investigations group, found itself facing public scrutiny for the first time following the revelation in December 2008 that Christchurch man Rob Gilchrist had been spying for SIG officers on individuals and organisations including Greenpeace, Iraq war protestors, student associations, animal rights and climate change campaigners.

News that SIG existed first emerged in public media in December 2008, when it was reported that an exposed SIG spy had spied on political parties and organisations involved in peaceful, environmental, animal and human rights activities. Subsequent articles reported that SIG had been receiving information on a variety of organisations including unions, contrary to a prior claim that only individuals were targeted.

Officers involved in the group include Detective Peter and Detective Senior Sergeant John, both named in connection with the G incident. The Sunday Star Times reported, at the time the G scandal broke, that Detective Peter 'moved to New Zealand in 1973 from the London Metropolitan Police and was a member of the Armed Offenders Squad and then Special Tactics Group from 1975 to 1999, when he appears to have moved into police intelligence work'.

Within days of details covering SIG activities being released into mainstream media in December 2008, New Zealanders began calling for a commission of enquiry into the group.

SIG has been criticised for spying on peaceful protest and community organisations, wasting resources, and using "Stasi tactics and covert political operations that undermine democracy" (Keith Locke, Green Party police spokesperson). The group has also been criticised for "dangling money, public money, in front of protest group members, such as G, in an attempt to [turn] them into spies" (Alan Liefting, Coalition spokesperson), and for having "gone well outside its mandate" (Andrew Little, EPMU president).

On 22 December 2008 the Maritime Union of New Zealand announced it had received legal advice and would seek further action. The union wants to know what information is held by police about itself. Others who have already received SIG information about themselves include pacifist Harmeet Singh Sooden, whose SIG files were released during a Scoop investigation in December 2008.

According to the New Zealand Herald, Police Commissioner Howard Broad commented that "he did not believe an inquiry is needed into allegations police have been spying on peaceful protest groups and defended the use of informants, saying they were used for a range of inquiries including murder." Broad stated that "police were not targeting peaceful protesters but if they were alerted to the possibility of violent action or vandalism, they acted." He also said that "SIG was intended to assess threats from individuals who may or may not be members of groups."

=== Christchurch terror attack ===
The National Security Investigations Team was heavily criticised in the Royal Commission of Inquiry into the Terrorist Attack on Christchurch Mosques on 15 March 2019. Conclusions from the report noted that the NSIT had placed undue emphasis on policing Muslim communities in order to intervene in potential cases of Islamic extremism, to the detriment of efforts to combat right wing terrorism. The report noted that the NSIT had ignored recommendations to better integrate itself into police districts, and had failed to standardise a process of following up leads. The NSIT was also criticised by ethnic, Pacific and iwi liaison officers for undermining community trust in the police.

The royal inquiry was itself criticised in the New Zealand media for not going far enough in its criticisms of government and police organisations, and ultimately concluding that no organisation was at fault or had breached standards. The NSIT's focus on Islamic terrorism was also blamed on former Prime Minister Sir John Key, who emphasised the threat of ISIL around the time of the team's restructure.
