= New Zealand Police =

National police service of New Zealand

New Zealand Police Ngā Pirihimana o Aotearoa (Māori)
- NZP Logo

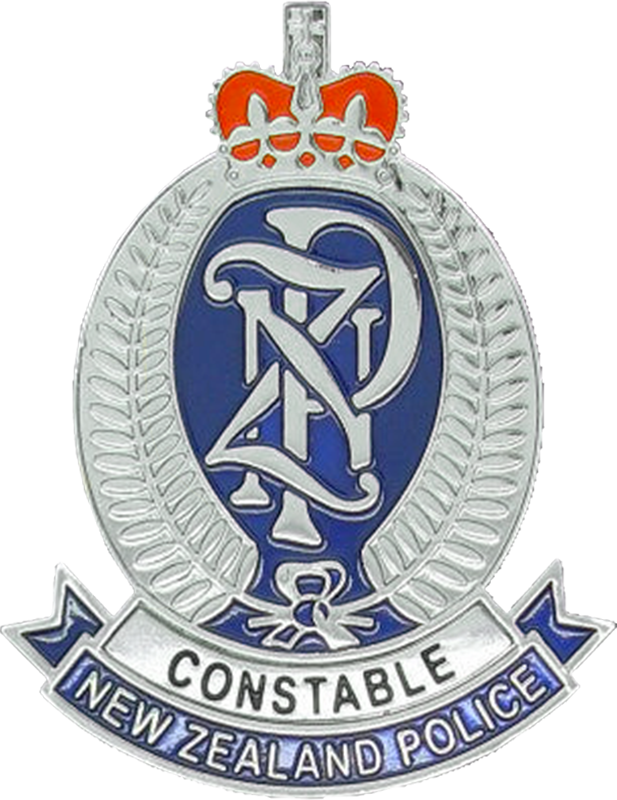
- NZP Constable Badge

- Flag of the New Zealand Police
- Abbreviation: NZP
- Motto: Safer Communities Together

Agency overview
- Formed: 1886 (Note: It was established as the "Police Force" in 1886 and shortened to the current name in 1958.)
- Preceding agency: New Zealand Constabulary Force
- Employees: 15,700 (30 June 2024)
- Annual budget: $2.844 Billion NZD; Total budget for 2024/2025

Jurisdictional structure
- National agency: New Zealand
- Operations jurisdiction: New Zealand
- Governing body: New Zealand Government
- Constituting instrument: Policing Act 2008
- General nature: Civilian police

Operational structure
- Overseen by: Independent Police Conduct Authority
- Headquarters: 180 Molesworth Street, Wellington 6011
- 41.2734°S 174.7782°E
- Sworn officers: 10,139
- Non-sworn members: 4,658
- Minister responsible: Mark Mitchell, Minister of Police
- Agency executive: Richard Chambers, Commissioner of police
- Services: 31: 111 Emergency; Armed Offenders Squad; Beat and patrol; Communications; Special Tactics Group; Criminal investigation; Dignitary Protection Service; Dive; Diversion; Dogs; Drugs; E-crime; EM-bail; Ethnic; Evaluation; Financial; Fingerprint; Firearms; Forensics; Info4traders; Interpol; Licensing; Maritime; Missing persons; Museum; International; Road policing; Search & rescue; Statistics; Tenders; Vetting; Youth education
- Districts: 12: Northland; Waitematā; Auckland City; Counties Manukau; Waikato; Bay of Plenty; Eastern; Central; Wellington; Tasman; Canterbury; Southern

Facilities
- Stations: 324
- Vehicles: 3,700
- Specialist vehicles: 555
- Boats: 2
- Helicopters: 3

Website
- www.police.govt.nz

The New Zealand Police (Māori: Ngā Pirihimana o Aotearoa, lit. 'The Police Officers of New Zealand') is the national police service and principal law enforcement agency of New Zealand, responsible for preventing crime, enhancing public safety, bringing offenders to justice, and maintaining public order. With over 15,000 personnel, it is the largest law enforcement agency in New Zealand and, with few exceptions, has primary jurisdiction over the majority of New Zealand criminal law. The New Zealand Police also has responsibility for traffic and commercial vehicle enforcement as well as other key responsibilities including protection of dignitaries, firearms licensing, and matters of national security.

Policing in New Zealand was introduced in 1840, modelled on similar constabularies that existed in Britain at that time. The constabulary was initially part police and part militia. By the end of the 19th century policing by consent was the goal and since the change the New Zealand Police has generally enjoyed a reputation for mild policing, but there have been cases when the use of force was criticised, such as during the 1981 South Africa rugby union tour of New Zealand and the United States. New Zealand is one of only 19 countries with a 'generally unarmed' police service. While New Zealand Police officers do not routinely carry firearms, they do have access to firearms in their vehicles.

The current Minister of Police is Mark Mitchell. While the New Zealand Police is a government department with a minister responsible for it, the commissioner and sworn members swear allegiance directly to the sovereign and, by convention, have constabulary independence from the government of the day.

The New Zealand Police is perceived to have a minimal level of institutional corruption, though it has been involved in a variety of controversies over its long history.

== Origins and history ==
Prior to British colonisation, law in New Zealand was based on tikanga Māori and enforced by local iwi leaders through formal assemblies called rūnanga, with enforcement action carried out by selected warriors or expert practitioners called tohunga.

=== Colonial Police: 1840 ===
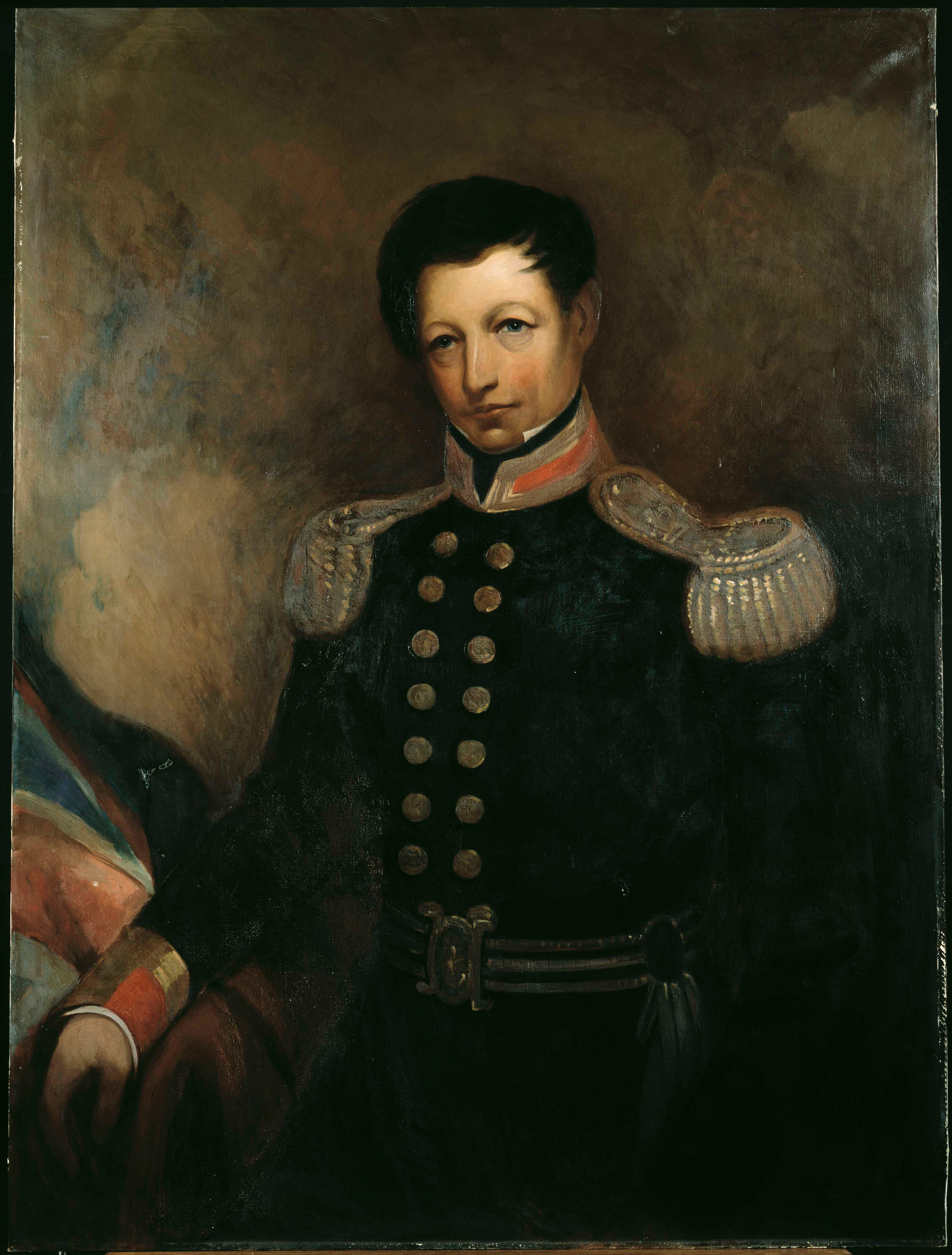
William Hobson, the first Governor of New Zealand

The first formal policing service in New Zealand started in 1840 with the arrival of six constables of the New South Wales mounted police accompanying Lieutenant Governor William Hobson's official landing party to form the colony of New Zealand. Governor Hobson empowered Police Magistrates to appoint constables to enforce British laws within the early settlements.

The early 1800s saw increased scrutiny of policing practices throughout the British Empire, inspired in particular by the Metropolitan Police Act 1829 which had introduced policing by consent. Despite these reforms, policing in colonial New Zealand continued to operate by force, especially towards Māori people. Supplemented by a small number of British soldiers, the Colonial Police played a significant role in extending British control beyond the first settlements.

=== Armed Police Force: 1846 ===
Under governor George Grey, the colonial police forces were replaced by the Armed Police Force (APF) in 1846, under the Constabulary Act 1846. The subsequent Armed Constabulary Act 1867 focused the force on dealing with unrest between the indigenous Māori and the encroaching European settlers and the force grew to 200 musket-trained men. The armed constabulary took part in military actions against Māori opponents Riwha Tītokowaru in Taranaki and Te Kooti in the central North Island in the final stages of the New Zealand Wars.

=== New Zealand Constabulary Force: 1877 ===
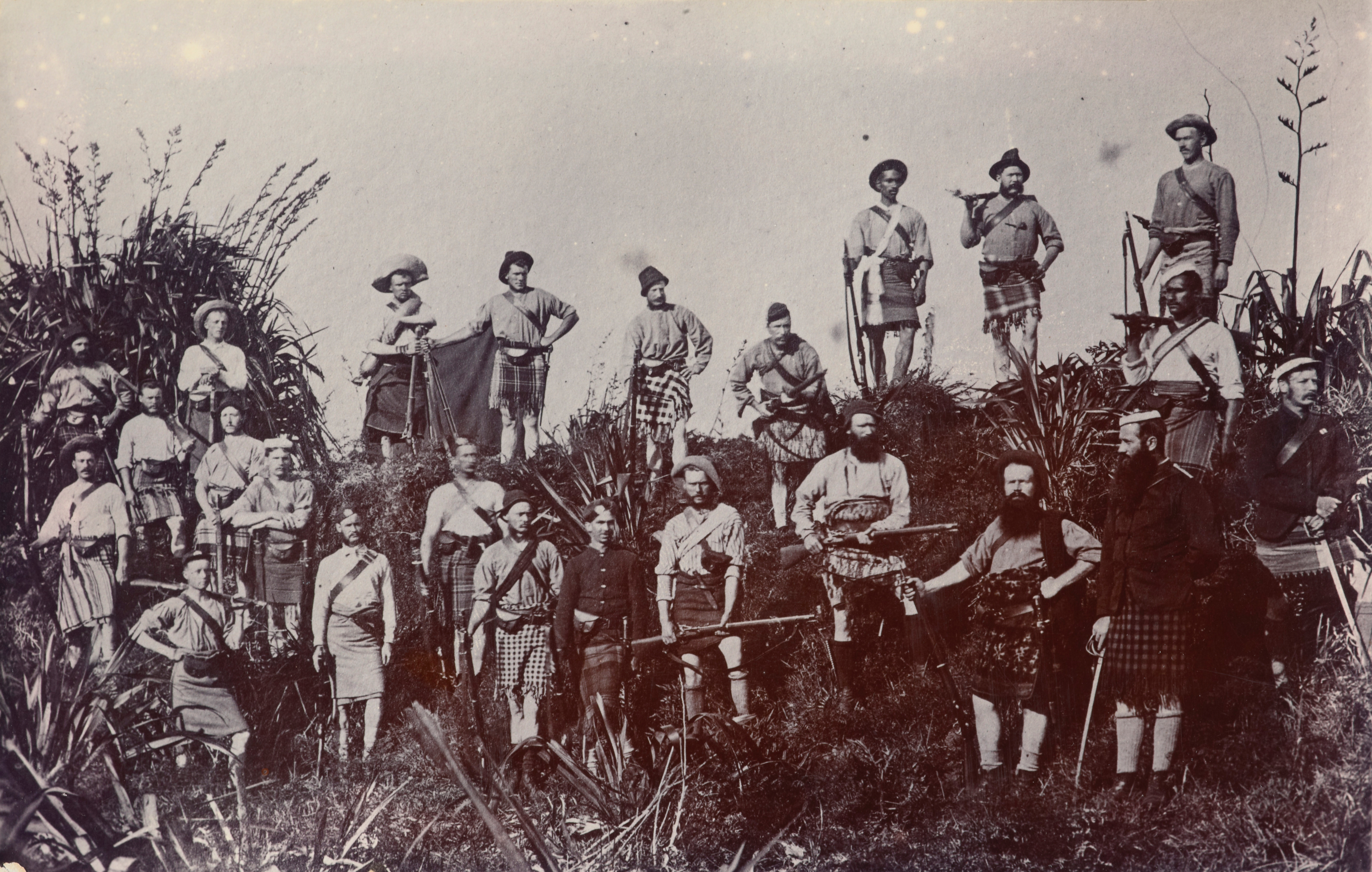
NZ Constabulary Force members in 1879, wearing shawl kilts

The Provinces of New Zealand Act 1875 abolished the early provinces of New Zealand, and as a result, the AFP merged with the assorted policing organisations present in the former provinces to form the New Zealand Constabulary Force in 1877. The new force had two main divisions: the Policing Branch in the cities and the Field Force, which continued to exercise military-style surveillance over Māori in some areas. The last significant operation of the Field Force was the crushing of Te Whiti o Rongomai and Tohu Kākahi's passive resistance movement at Parihaka in 1881.

=== New Zealand Police Force: 1886 ===
The New Zealand Police Force was established as a single national law enforcement agency under the Police Force Act 1886. At the same time, the militia functions of the Armed Constabulary were transferred to the New Zealand Permanent Militia by the Defence Act 1886.

Just a decade later, policing in New Zealand was given a significant overhaul. In 1898 there was a very constructive Royal Commission of Enquiry into New Zealand Police. The Royal Commission, which included the reforming Commissioner Tunbridge who had come from the Metropolitan Police in London, produced a far-reaching report which laid the basis for positive reform of New Zealand Police for the next several decades. A complete review of police legislation in 1908 built significantly off the Royal Commission's work.

A further police force act, in 1947, reflected some changes of a growing New Zealand, and a country coming out of World War II. The most significant change in the structure and arrangement for police came after the departure of Commissioner Compton under a cloud of government and public concern over his management of Police in 1955. The appointment of a caretaker civilian leader of police, especially titled "controller general" to recognise his non-operational background, opened the windows on the organisation and allowed a period of positive and constructive development to take place.

In 1953 police horses were retired.

=== New Zealand Police: 1958 ===
Despite being the same organisation in 1958, the word force was removed from the name with the Police Act 1958, which was a significant overhaul of police legislation.

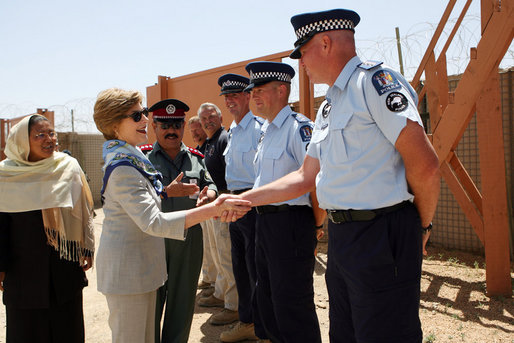
Laura Bush, 43rd First Lady of the United States, in this 2008 photo, meeting New Zealand Police officers in Bamyan, Afghanistan

On 1 July 1992, the Traffic Safety Service of the Ministry of Transport was merged with the police. Up until that time, the Ministry of Transport and local councils had been responsible for traffic law enforcement. In 2000, the police re-established a specialist road policing branch known as the "highway patrol". Today the police are mainly responsible for enforcing traffic law, while local councils can appoint parking wardens, who can enforce traffic rules regarding parking and special vehicle lanes. In 2010, after some calls to split traffic enforcement again from standard police duties, it was decided that it would remain part of their duties, partly due to the public having shown "enormous support" for it remaining this way.

The Police Act 1958 was extensively reviewed starting in 2006, after a two and a half-year consultative process the Policing Act 2008 came into effect on 1 October 2008. The process included the world's first use of a wiki to allow the public to submit or propose amendments. The wiki was open for less than two weeks, but drew international attention.

More recently, the New Zealand Police has been involved in international policing and peacekeeping missions to East Timor and the Solomon Islands, to assist these countries with establishing law and order after civil unrest. It has also been involved in community police training in Bougainville, in conjunction with Australian Federal Police. Other overseas deployments for regional assistance and relief have been to Afghanistan as part of the reconstruction effort, the Kingdom of Tonga, Thailand for the tsunami disaster and Indonesia after terrorist bombings. New Zealand Police maintains an international policing support network in eight foreign capitals, and has about 80 staff deployed in differing international missions.

=== Female officers ===
In 1936, there was "a proposal to establish a women police branch in New Zealand", and former principal of the women's section of the South Australia Police, Kate Cocks (1875–1954), attended to speak to the member of the government, the commissioner of police, and a gathering of women's societies.

Women were first admitted to the police in 1941 but were not issued uniforms. One of the first intakes was Edna Bertha Pearce, who received the badge number S1 when she was finally issued a uniform in 1952. Pearce made the first arrest by a female police officer in New Zealand. By January 1949, officer R. M. Hadfield did a cross-Tasman interchange, working for two months in Sydney, a month in Melbourne, and Tasmania. At the time, female officers wore only small badges under their coat lapels. 1994 was the last year female officers had a separate uniform to men with the removal of skirts in 1995. In 2020, hijabs were introduced as part of the uniform for Muslim women.

In 2023 on international women's day Director of Recruitment Paula Hill said "As at 31 January this year we had 2,679 full time equivalent constabulary women, this means 25.6% of all constabulary are women – this is the first international women's day where more than 1 in 4 of the constabulary workforce in New Zealand Police are women."

In 1992 less than 10% of the New Zealand Police were women, but by 2024 38.5% of all New Zealand Police employees were women and 26.1% of all constabulary staff (excluding recruits) were women. This was a 0.5% increase over the previous year (2023) showing a continued improvement of the number of women in constabulary roles.

Between the resignation of Andrew Coster on the 11 November 2024 and the appointment of Richard Chambers on the 25 November 2024 the first ever female Commissioner of Police Tania Kura was appointed for an interim term of 14 days.

Early New Years Day 2025 Senior Sergeant Lyn Fleming became the first female officer to be killed in the line of duty. Fleming was struck by a vehicle driving at speed in an attack described by the commissioner as "an unprovoked and senseless act".

== Organisation ==
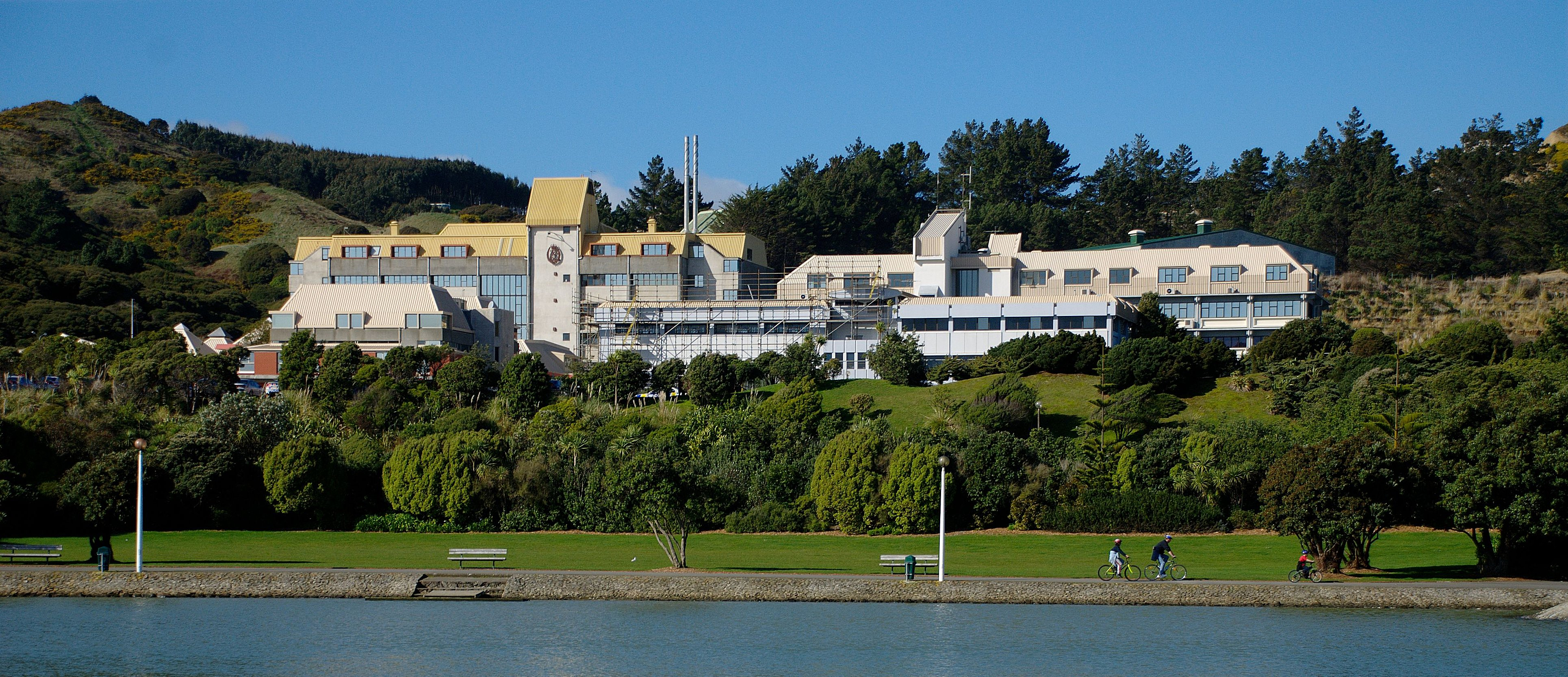
Royal New Zealand Police College

The Police National Headquarters provides policy and planning advice as well as national oversight and management of the organisation. Although headed by a Commissioner, the New Zealand Police is a decentralised organisation divided into 12 districts.

Each district has a geographical area of responsibility and a central station from which subsidiary and suburban stations are managed. As of March 2019, there are 327 police stations around the country with nearly 12,000 staff who respond to more than 600,000 emergency 111 calls each year.

The Commissioner is in overall charge of the New Zealand Police. Assisting the Commissioner are two chief officers in the rank of Deputy Commissioner: Deputy Commissioner-Resource Management; and Deputy Commissioner-Operations.

Five chief officers in the rank of Assistant Commissioner and the Director of Intelligence report to the Deputy Commissioner-Operations. The Assistant Commissioner-Investigations/International is responsible for the National Criminal Investigations Group, the Organised and Financial Crime Agency New Zealand (OFCANZ), Financial Crime Group, International Services Group and Pacific Islands Chiefs of Police Secretariat. The Investigations and International Group leads the prevention, investigation, disruption and prosecution of serious and transnational crime. It also leads liaison, overseas deployment and capacity building with international policing partners. The Assistant Commissioner-Operations is responsible for Community Policing, Youth, Communications Centres, Operations Group, Prosecutions and Road Policing. The remaining three Assistant Commissioners command geographical policing areas – Upper North, Lower North and South. Each area is divided into three to five districts.

District Commanders hold the rank of superintendent, as do sworn National Managers, the road policing manager in the Waitemata District, responsible for the motorway network and traffic alcohol group. Area Commanders hold the rank of Inspector as do Shift Commanders based in each of the three Communications Centres. District Section Commanders are typically Senior Sergeants. The New Zealand Police is a member of Interpol and has close relationships with the Australian police forces, at both the state and federal level. Several New Zealand Police representatives are posted overseas in key New Zealand diplomatic missions.

It is acknowledged, by both police and legislation, that important and valuable roles in the performance of the functions of the police are played by: public agencies or bodies (for example, local authorities and state sectors), persons who hold certain statutory offices (for example, Maori Wardens), and parts of the private sector, especially the private security industry. It is also acknowledged that it is often appropriate, or even necessary, for police to perform some of its functions by working in cooperation with citizens, or other agencies or bodies.

=== Police Prosecution Service (PPS) ===
The New Zealand Police Prosecution Service (PPS) is a branch within police that is responsible for initiating all criminal prosecutions in New Zealand. Police prosecutors may be a sworn members of the police (normally a sergeant) or a civilian lawyer employed as a non-sworn member of the police - however being a practicing lawyer is not a requirement for the role. All other common law countries except for Australia have discontinued police prosecutions citing a general lack of independence and objectivity of police prosecutors which is likely to be compromised by close contact with police officers, adherence to police culture, and a desire to maintain positive relationships with fellow police officers and staff.

=== Districts ===
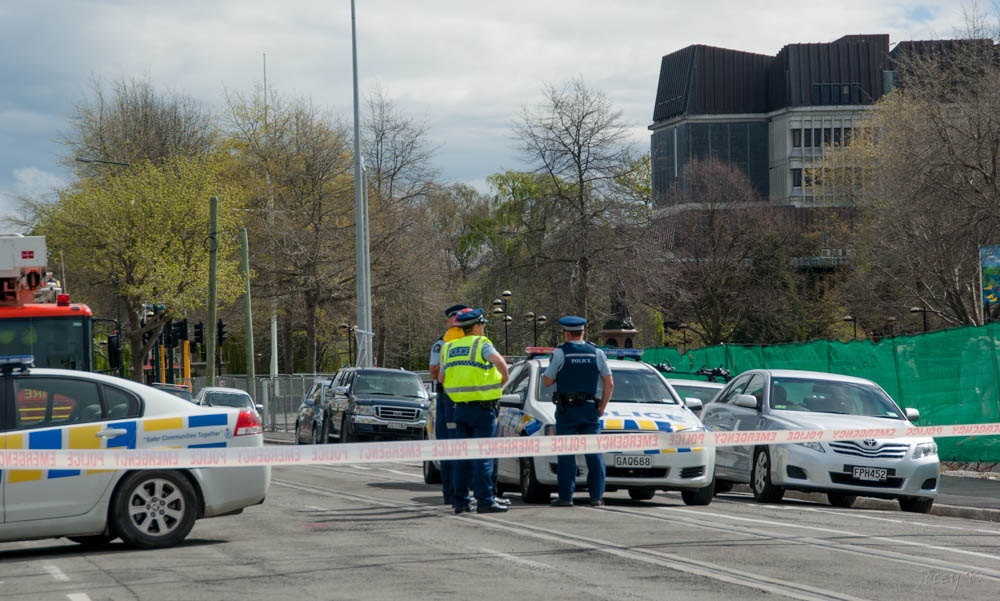
Police officers at the scene of an incident in Christchurch

The New Zealand Police is organised into 12 districts: nine in the North Island and three in the South Island. Each district is subdivided into between two and four areas:

- Northland – based in Whangārei; divided into two areas: Far North (Kerikeri) and Whangarei-Kaipara (Whangārei).
- Waitematā – based in Henderson; divided into three areas: North (Orewa), West (Henderson), and East (Rosedale).
- Auckland City – based in Auckland Central; divided into three areas: West (Avondale), Central (Auckland Central), and East (Mount Wellington).
- Counties-Manukau – based in Manukau; divided into four areas: West (Ōtāhuhu), Central (Manurewa), East (Flat Bush), and South (Papakura).
- Waikato – based in Hamilton; divided into three areas: Hamilton City, Waikato West (Huntly), and Waikato East (Thames).
- Bay of Plenty – based in Rotorua; divided into four areas: Western Bay of Plenty (Tauranga), Eastern Bay of Plenty (Whakatāne), Rotorua, and Taupō.
- Eastern – based in Hastings; divided into two areas: Hawke's Bay (Hastings) and Tairāwhiti (Gisborne).
- Central – based in Palmerston North; divided into three areas: Taranaki (New Plymouth), Whanganui, and Manawatū (Palmerston North).
- Wellington – based in Wellington; divided into four areas: Wellington City, Kapiti-Mana (Porirua), Hutt Valley (Lower Hutt), and Wairarapa (Masterton).
- Tasman – based in Nelson; divided into three areas: Nelson Bays (Nelson), Marlborough (Blenheim), and West Coast (Greymouth).
- Canterbury – based in Christchurch; divided into three areas: Christchurch Metro, Canterbury Rural (Rangiora) and Aoraki (Timaru).
- Southern – based in Dunedin; divided into three areas: Otago Coastal (Dunedin), Otago Lakes-Central (Queenstown), and Southland (Invercargill).

=== Communications centres ===
New Zealand Police operate five communications centres that are responsible for receiving 111 emergency calls, 105 non-emergency calls, *555 traffic calls and general calls for service and dispatching the relevant response. The centres include:

- Northern Communications Centre, based in Auckland is responsible for the northern half of the North Island, down to Hicks Bay, Desert Road south of Turangi, and Awakino
- Central Communications Centre, based in Wellington is responsible for the southern half of the North Island, from Mokau, Taumarunui, the Desert Road north of Waiouru, and Te Araroa in the north
- Digital Services Centre, based in Kāpiti is responsible for non-emergency communication such as the 105 non-emergency line
- Southern Communications Centre, based in the Christchurch Central Police Station, responsible for the South Island.

=== Ranks ===
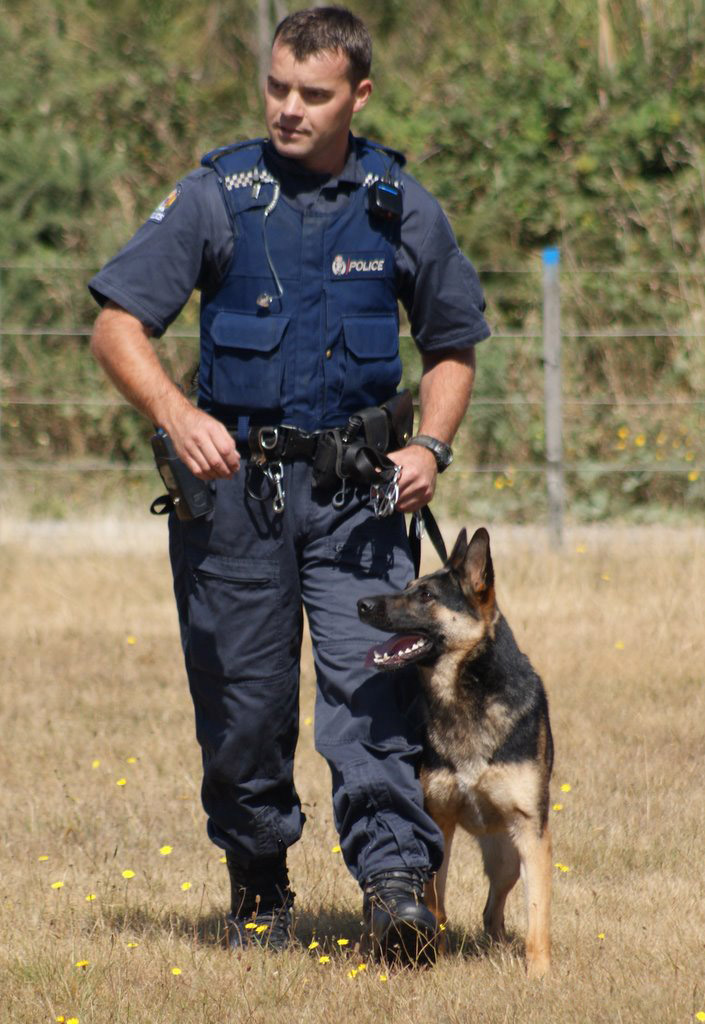
Police dog handler with old SRBA vest

==== Constable ====
A police employee becomes a Constable by swearing the oath under section 22 of the New Zealand Policing Act 2008. Upon doing so the Constable receives certain statutory powers and responsibilities, including the power of arrest. A recently graduated constable is considered a Probationary constable for up to two years, until they have passed 10 workplace assessment standards. The completion of the above is known as obtaining permanent appointment.

After a Constable obtains their permanent appointment, they can move away from being a General Duties Constable which generally involves being in the Public Safety Team or Community Beat Team. After five years a Constable can apply for more specialist roles such as CIB, Dog Handler, Sergeant, etc.

The rank of Senior Constable is granted to Constables after 14 years of service and the Commissioner of Police is satisfied with their conduct. Senior Constables are well regarded within the New Zealand Police for their extensive policing experience, and are often used to train and mentor other police officers.

==== Detective ====
Detective ranks somewhat parallel the street ranks up to Detective Superintendent. Trainee detectives spend a minimum of six months as a Constable on Trial after completing an intensive selection and induction course. During these initial six months they are required to pass four module based exams before progression to Detective Constable. They are then required to continue studying with another six exam based modules as well as a number of workplace assessments. Once the Detective Constable has completed all of this they are then required to sit a pre-requisite exam based on all of the exam based modules they have previously sat. If they are successful in passing this they attend the Royal New Zealand Police College where they complete their training with the Detective Qualification course before receiving the final designation of Detective. All of these requirements are expected to be completed within two to three years.

Detective and Detective Constable are considered designations and ranks mirror that of uniformed officers. That is, Detectives do not outrank uniformed constables.

==== Non-commissioned officer ====
Sergeant and Senior Sergeant are the only two non-commissioned officer ranks. Unlike with commissioned officers, to promote to the rank of a Sergeant, Constables must have a good understanding of general policing and pass the Core Policing Knowledge examination, but do not need to be commissioned by the Governor-General.

==== Commissioned officer ====
Officers of Inspector rank and higher are commissioned by the Governor-General, but are still promoted from the ranks of non-commissioned officers, usually Senior Sergeants. The promotion to a commissioned officer often comes with additional responsibility in Area or District Command Centres or Police National Headquarters (PHNQ). Only 5% of officers are commissioned.

==== Authorised officer ====
Authorised officers are non-sworn staff who do not have the power of arrest. They work as jailers, guards, transport enforcement officers and specialist crime investigators, such as electronic crime investigators and forensic accountants. They wear black uniforms, rather than the blue uniforms of sworn officers. The number of authorised officers increased following the recommendation of a 2012 review of the police that they be used to take some of the workload from sworn officers.

== Insignia and uniform ==
New Zealand Police ranks and insignia
Rank	Commissioner	Deputy Commissioner	Assistant Commissioner	Executive Superintendent	Superintendent	Inspector
Epaulette insignia						
Military equivalent	Lieutenant General	Major General	Brigadier	Lieutenant Colonel		Captain
Percentage of officers	5%					

New Zealand Police ranks and insignia
Rank	Senior Sergeant	Sergeant	Senior Constable	Constable	Recruit
Epaulette insignia					
Military equivalent	Warrant Officer Class 2	Sergeant	Lance Corporal	Private	Recruit
Percentage of officers	5%	15%	75%		

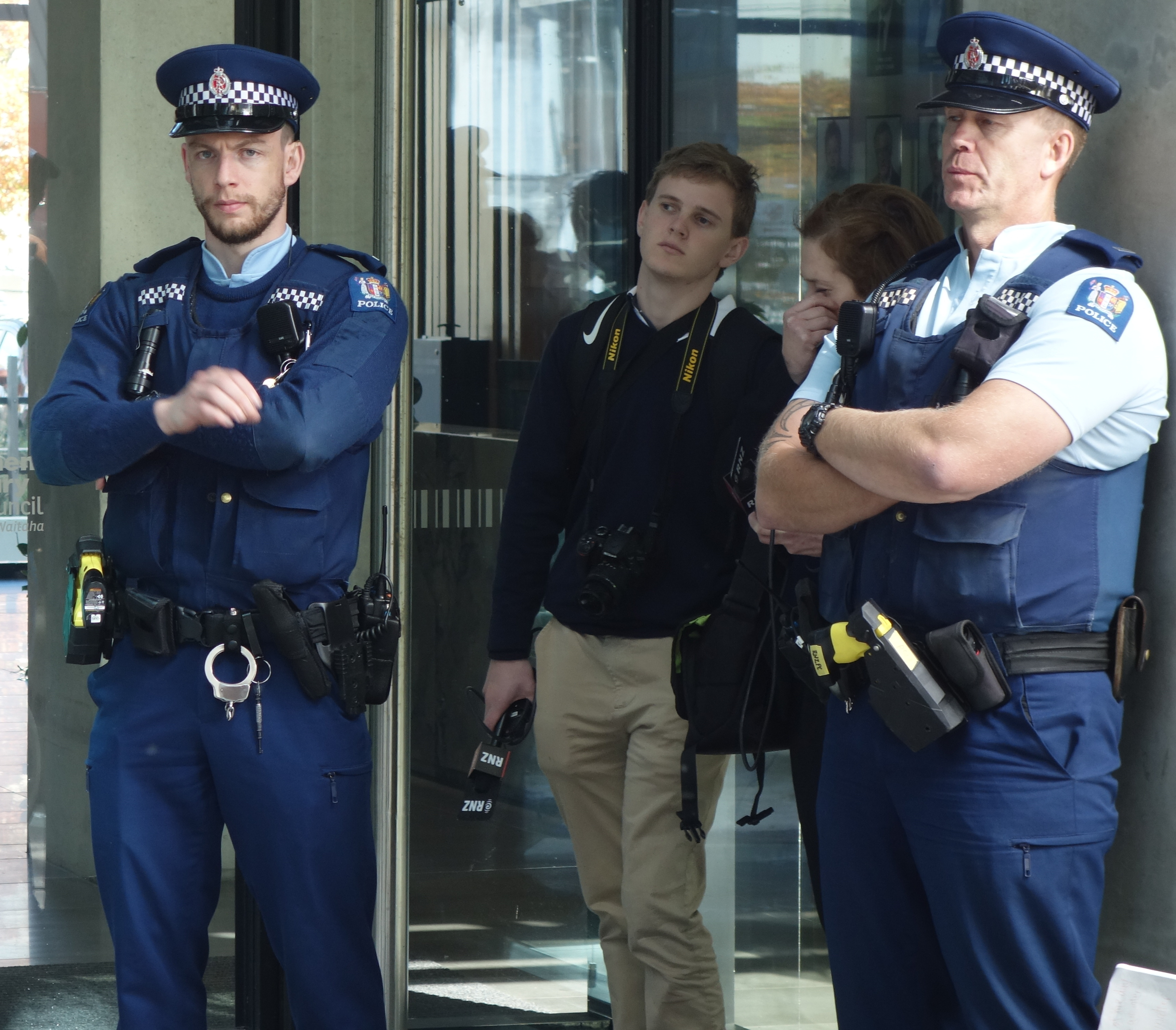
Two officers at a protest

New Zealand police uniforms formerly followed the British model closely but, since the 1970s, a number of changes have been implemented. These include the adoption of a medium blue shade in place of dark blue, the abolition of custodian helmets and the substitution of synthetic leather jackets for silver buttoned tunics when on ordinary duty. The normal headdress is a peaked cap with blue and white Sillitoe tartan band and silver badge. Baseball caps, Akubra wide-brimmed hats, Turbans and Hijabs are authorised for particular duties, climatic conditions or cultural and religious reasons. Stab resistant and high visibility vests are normally worn on duty. The body vests are also marked with Sillitoe tartan markings.

AOS and STG members, when deployed, wear the usual charcoal-coloured clothing used by armed-response and counter-terror units around the world. In 2008, a survey found strong staff support for the re-introduction of the white custodian helmets worn until 1995, to reinforce the police's professional image.

== Equipment ==
=== Communications ===
==== Phones ====
Police officers communicate with each other via Apple iPhones. According to One NZ (then Vodafone New Zealand) the adaption of smart phones into police equipment was expected to save each officer 30 minutes of productivity per shift equating to a gain of 520,000 hours per year of productivity through use of police specific applications on the devices. The iPhones now operate on the Hourua Network for emergency services as of November 2024 giving them priority access and roaming capabilities on both One NZ and Spark Cellular Networks as part of the new Public Safety Network (PSN).

==== Two-way radios ====
For shorter, fast communication, front-line police officers also use two-way radios. Police currently use the Tait P25 for two-way radio communication in main cities. In 2009 New Zealand Police began moving from using VHF/UHF analogue two-way radios to trialling digital encrypted two-way radios in the Wellington region. The trial was perceived as having been successful and rolled out to Auckland and Canterbury in 2010 and New Zealand Police planned to roll out digital encrypted two-way radios to all regions, however, this did not progress as planned and the roll out to areas outside of main centres only began in 2025 as part of the new Public Safety Network (PSN) for Emergency Services with the Secure Digital Land Mobile Radio(LMR) System based on the P25 Phase 2 standard to be national wide by the end of 2026.

===== Communication codes =====
The New Zealand Police use a wide variety of radio codes for quick communication between officers and other police staff such as district command centres or communication centres. Police use their own adaption of 10-codes used as status codes, k-codes used as result codes, four-number codes used as event description codes and a number-letter codes used as incident codes.

=== Fleet ===
==== Drones ====
In 2012, the police began using drones also known as unmanned aerial vehicles or remotely piloted aircraft systems. By 2013, drones had been used only twice; in one case a drone was used in a criminal investigation and led to charges being laid in court. In 2023 police were certified to operate drones outside of normal legal constraints. Police drones are primarily used for search and rescue, crime and crash scene photography and high risk situations with the intent to extend the use of drones to include searches for clandestine graves during murder investigations. Drones are also used in rare instances for tracking fleeing offenders, monitoring gang activity and to locate illegal cannabis operations. Police have a varied array of drones with different purposes and uses, some drones have encased propellers for indoor flight, others are equipped specialised camera's such as 200x zoom cameras, thermal imagining cameras, multi-spectral cameras or Lidar. Unlike some other police services drones used by the New Zealand Police are not able to break through windows with Inspector Darren Russel saying, "We've certainly no intention to use anything that might be weaponised; I haven't seen any in New Zealand.". By 2023 170 officers were trained in the operation of drones and by 2025 150 drones were in operation.

==== Helicopters ====
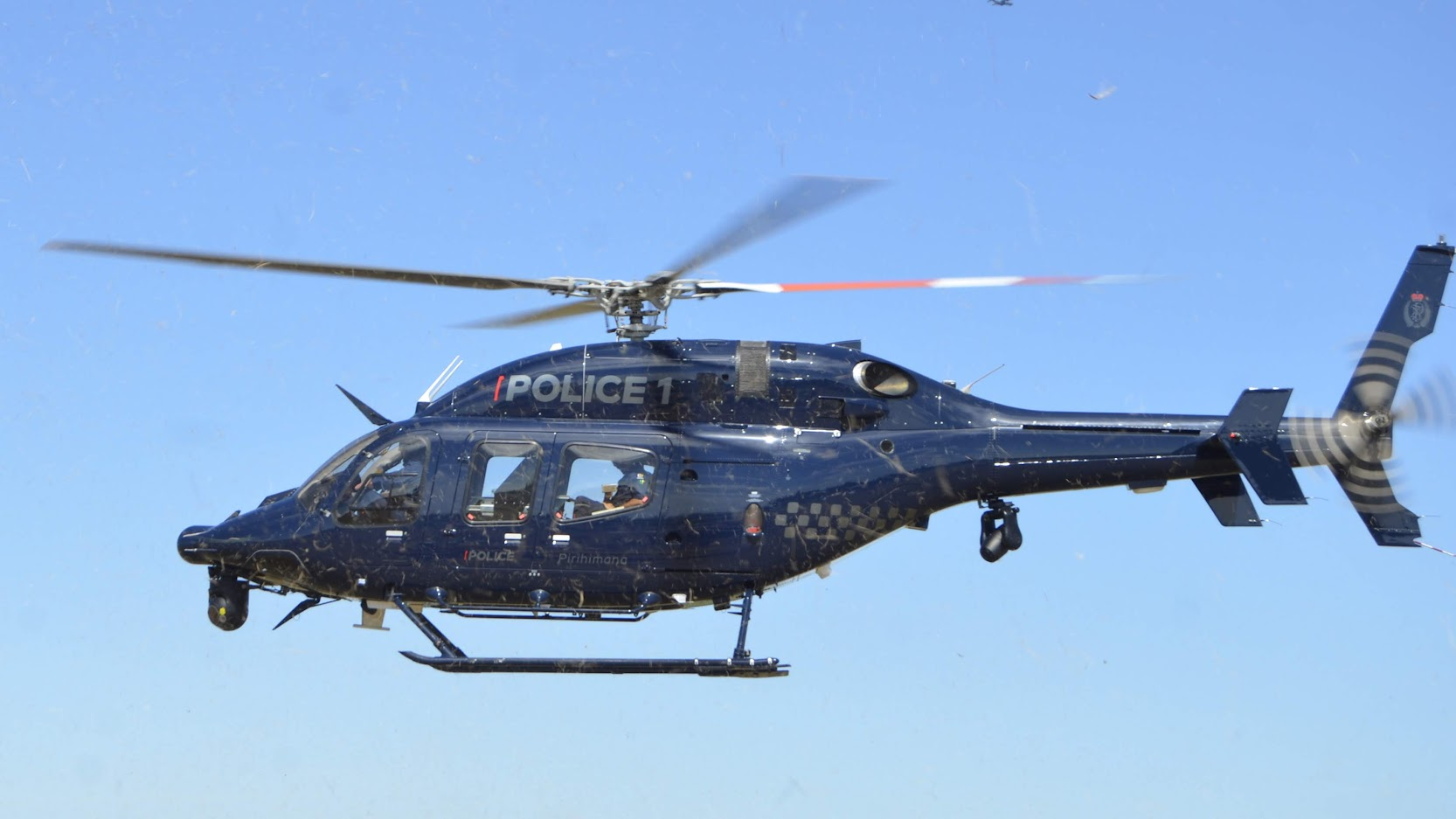
New Zealand Police Bell 429 GlobalRanger

The Air Support Unit, commonly known as its callsign Eagle, is based in Auckland at Auckland Heliport, Pikes Point, Onehunga and operates three Bell 429 GlobalRanger helicopters. Starting operation in 1988 the Eagle helicopters generally operate with a crew of three, one civilian pilot and two sworn officers who act as Tactical Flight Operators. The two Tactical Flight Operators, use a forward looking infrared (FLIR) camera, with night-vision equipment, a night-sun spotlight and gyro-stabilised binoculars, to support ground staff during operations and incidents. Police say the vantage point in the sky allows the Tactical Flight Operators to coordinate ground units to best deal with the operation or incident. Since October 2017 the Eagle helicopter has been operating a 24/7 service equating to 3,300 flight hours annually. In February 2020, an Eagle helicopter was based in Christchurch at Christchurch Airport for a five-week trial that was eventually cancelled due to budgetary constraints. Despite the permanent Eagle operation being cancelled, the Eagle helicopter often travels to Christchurch and Wellington for major operations such as the 2022 Wellington Anti Mandate Protest.

===== Mid-air collision =====
In 1993 a helicopter, operated by Airwork under contract to the New Zealand Police, collided mid-air with a traffic spotter plane above the Auckland Motorway. The collision resulted in the death of three in the police helicopter, Sergeant Lindsay Eion Grant, Constable Alastair Alan Sampson and civilian pilot Ross Harvey along with the death of one in the traffic spotter plane, pilot Allan Connors. The collision took place in uncontrolled airspace, with both aircraft operating under visual flight rules.

==== Maritime Units ====
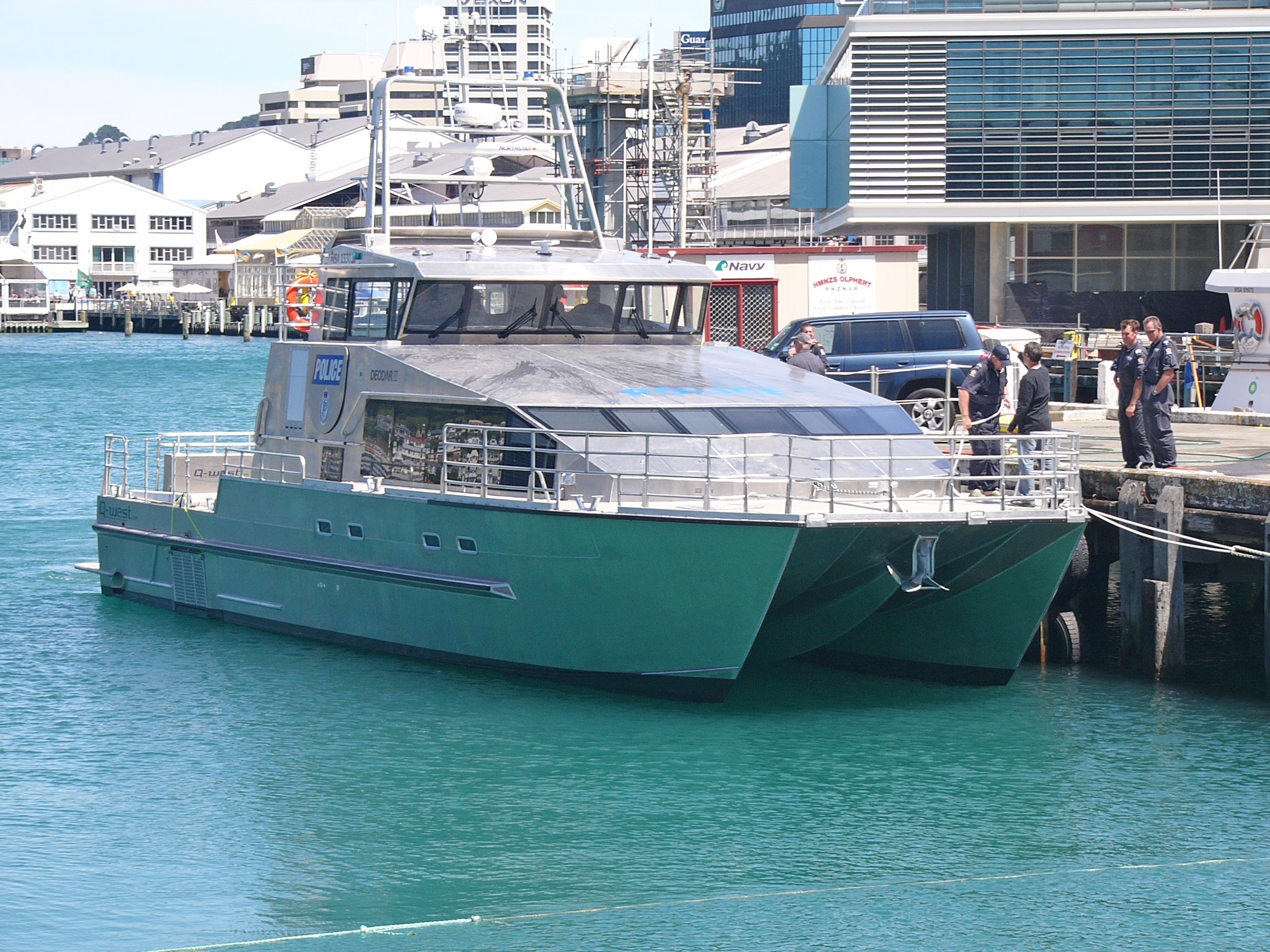
The 18.5-metre police catamaran Deodar III, based in Auckland

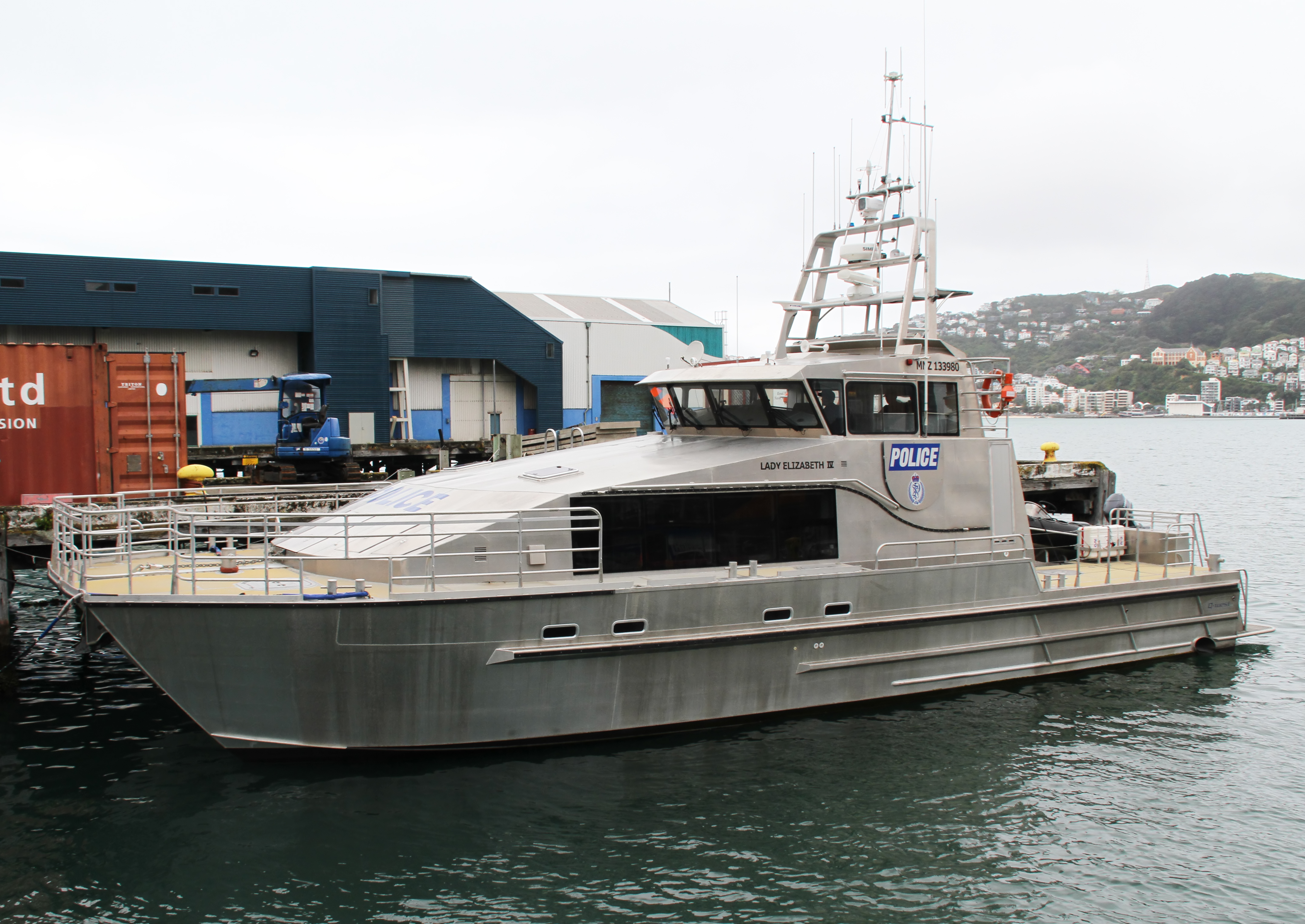
The Deodar III's sister, Lady Elizabeth IV, based in Wellington

The New Zealand Police operates two Maritime Units, the Deodar III in Auckland commissioned in 2007 and its sister the Lady Elizabeth IV in Wellington commissioned in 2010. Both Maritime Units are supported by various smaller vessels, including 12 metre, high speed RHIBs. Equipped with both medical bays and prisoner transport areas the two main vessels are used for a variety of purposes from attending crime scenes and apprehending offenders to search and rescue, medical emergencies, supporting public events, promoting water safety and facilitating training. Being able to operate past their harbour or gulf bounds, the two main vessels are often used for operations, with the Lady Elizabeth IV sometimes travelling to Christchurch, New Plymouth or along the coast when required.

Some vessels are used by the New Zealand Police, but are not within the Auckland or Wellington Maritime Units. These vessels such as the Waikato's 'Ranger' are often smaller and used in areas with no other emergency response on the body of water.

===== Lady Elizabeth II Capsize =====
In 1986 the Lady Elizabeth II capsized killing two police officers, Constable Glenn Hughes and Senior Sergeant Phil Ward. The vessel operated for 13 years before a training exercise in rough seas caused the crew of four officers to go overboard. Following the sinking the following iterations of Maritime Units were designed to survive a roll over.

==== Road Vehicles ====
The New Zealand Police has around 3,800 road vehicles in its fleet with around 2200 of those vehicles being liveried frontline vehicles. Since 2021 the Škoda Superb station wagon has been the generic frontline road vehicle of choice known as Primary Response Vehicles or Prime one Patrol Vehicles. In 2026 Škoda confirmed the next generation Škoda Superb station wagon had been selected to continue to be the generic frontline road vehicle for the New Zealand Police. The Police Škoda Superb is extensively re-engineered to be better suited for police work and has a 7-speed gearbox, is all-wheel-drive, and has a 195 kW 2.0 litre supercharged engine. The Police variant also has changes to the chassis, a full-size spare instead of a space saver and cloth upholstery instead of leather.

Police also use a wide variety of utes (pickup trucks), motorbikes, SUV's, trucks, and vans in various work groups across police. Utes and SUV's are most commonly used in rural areas, however these vehicle are also used in urban areas by specialised work groups such as the Commercial Vehicle Safety Team. Trucks and vans are often used as Team Policing Units, Command Centres, Mobile Police Stations and Mobile Road Safety Base (previously booze bus). The Armed Offenders Squad has its own fleet of unmarked Toyota Land Cruisers equipped with bull bars and some with ballistic protection.

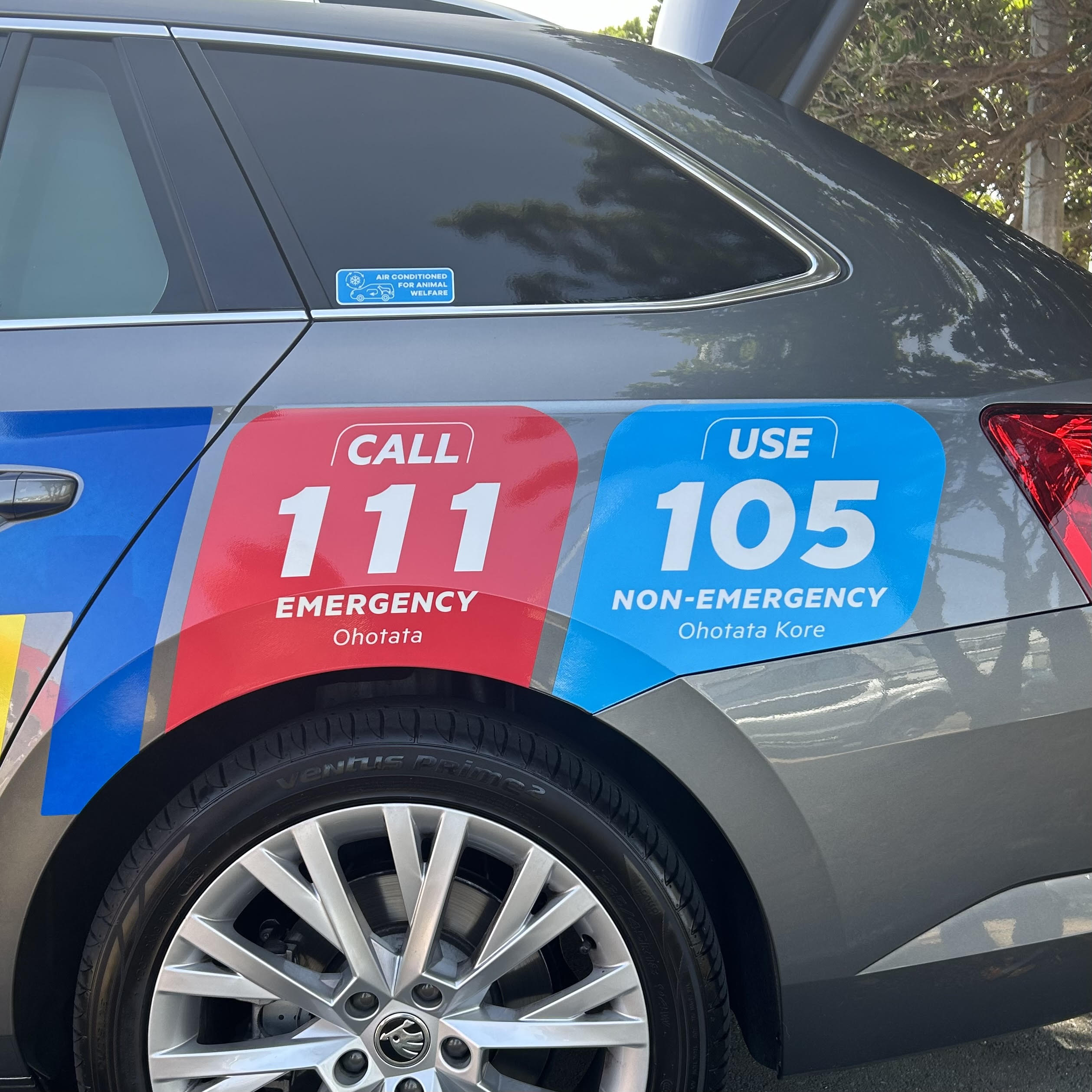
Dark grey Škoda Superb highlighting 111-105 information

Liveried vehicles are known as Marked or Uniform and are most commonly white, but can be other standard factory colours with a chequered Battenburg markings yellow-blue livery. Liveried vehicles make up the majority of the New Zealand Police fleet. In 2021 the New Zealand Police removed the iconic "Safer Communities Together" slogan from the side of their new vehicles instead using that area to promote the use of the 111 emergency and 105 non-emergency telephone numbers. Police also use a wide variety of vehicles without liveries with hidden emergency lights in standard factory colours, commonly known as unmarked, mufti, or covert vehicles.

===== Police Dog Section =====
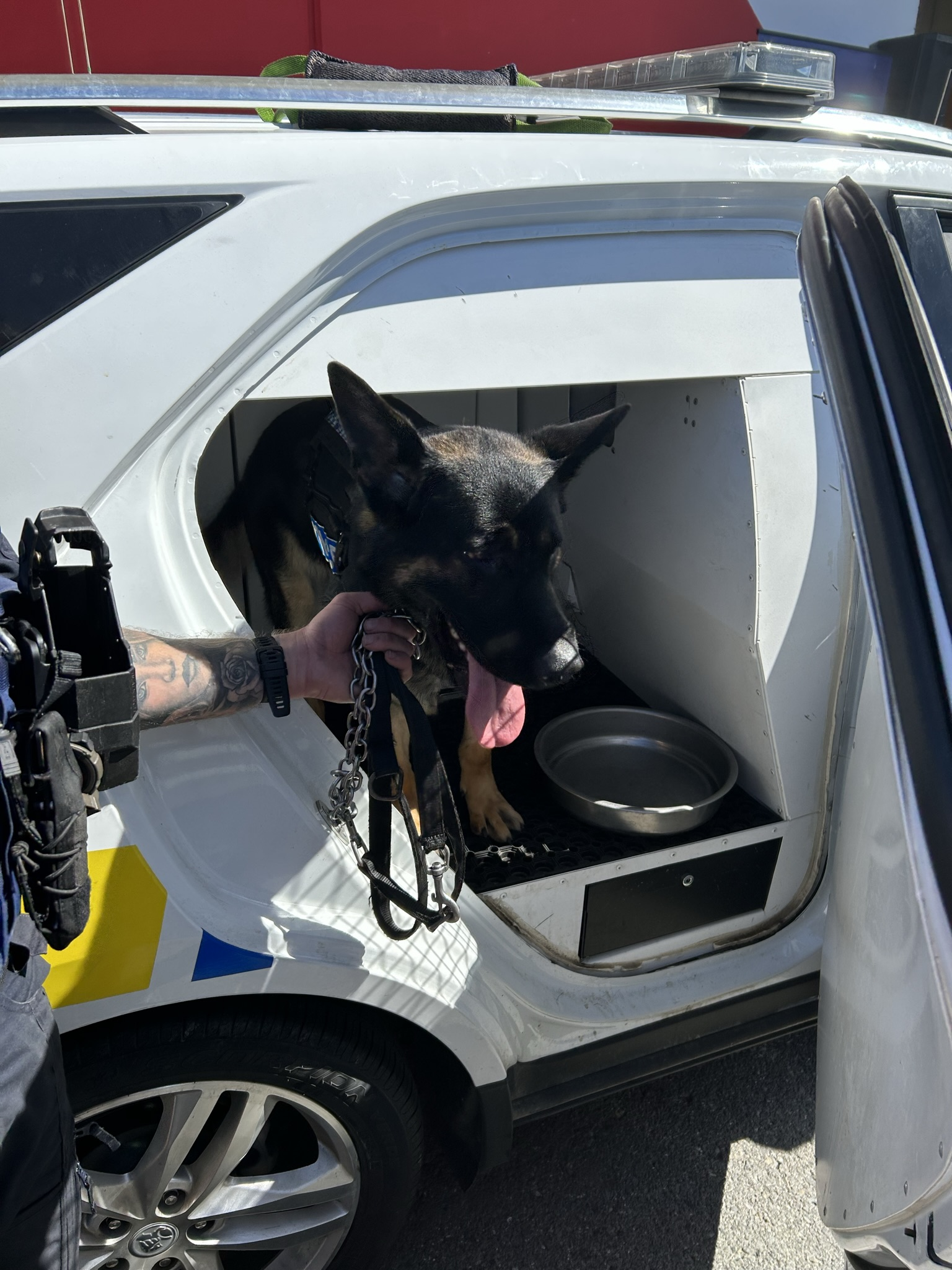
Police dog in Holden Equinox with handler

Dog Section handlers use specially modified Škoda Superbs or Ford Rangers. Dog Section vehicles may be liveried or unmarked, the livery on marked Dog Section vehicles is the same chequered yellow-blue Battenburg markings as other frontline police vehicles but have special markings that state Dog Unit on the sides, back and front. Dog Section vehicles are equipped with air-conditioned cages in the rear and remotely operated canopy doors to allow the handler to release their dog if away from the vehicle.

===== Vehicle Outfitting =====
The New Zealand Police don't outfit their own vehicles, instead they use Wade Group, a New Zealand vehicle outfitting company. Wade Group was founded in 1988, but didn't start outfitting police vehicles until 2015. During outfitting police vehicles are given a livery, emergency lights and sirens, radio communication, gun safes and speed detection equipment. The emergency lights and sirens are controlled by Wade Group's own control panel. Since starting to outfit police vehicles in 2015, by 2026 Wade Group had outfitted over 5500 vehicles.

===== Electric Vehicles =====
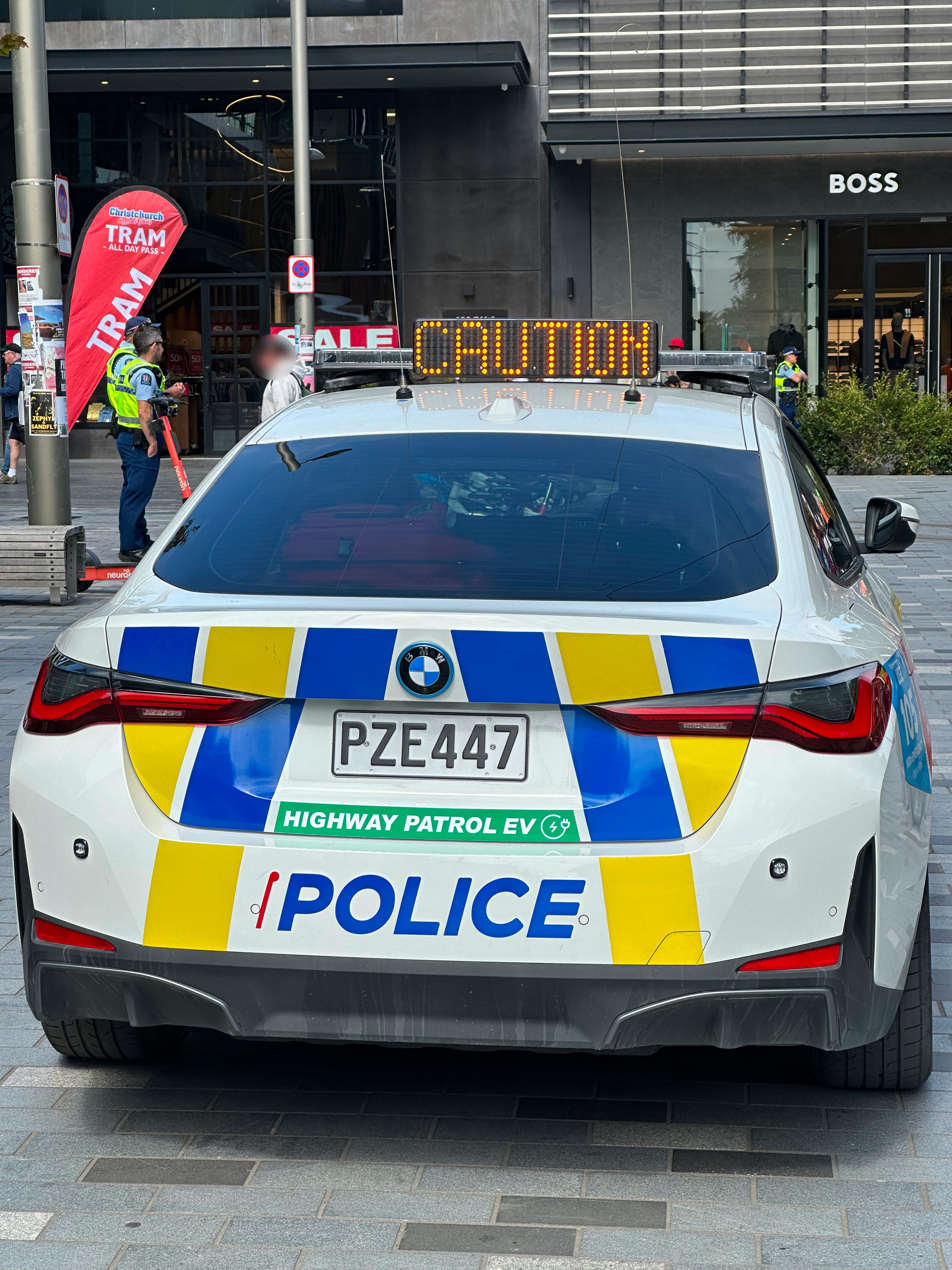
BMW i4 electric highway patrol vehicle.

According to then Commissioner of Police Andrew Coster, "The New Zealand Police is committed to being a sustainable organisation". As such police use both fully electric vehicles (EV) and Plug in Hybrid Electric vehicles (PHEV). In March 2022 a road trial for PHEVs was launched, Fleet Service Group Manager Brian Yanko says, "It's expected that the Škoda PHEV (Plug-in Hybrid Electric Vehicle) will be suited to frontline duties in an environment allowing for downtime where it can recharge, a process which takes around seven-hours from a standard 240-volt wall outlet". The trial is ongoing and more PHEVs are being purchased and used around the country. In June 2023 police began road trials of five fully electric BMW i4s used by Highway Patrol. The trial is not to test the capability of the BMW i4 in the police fleet, instead it is to test the capability of electric vehicles within police.

===== Current police vehicles =====
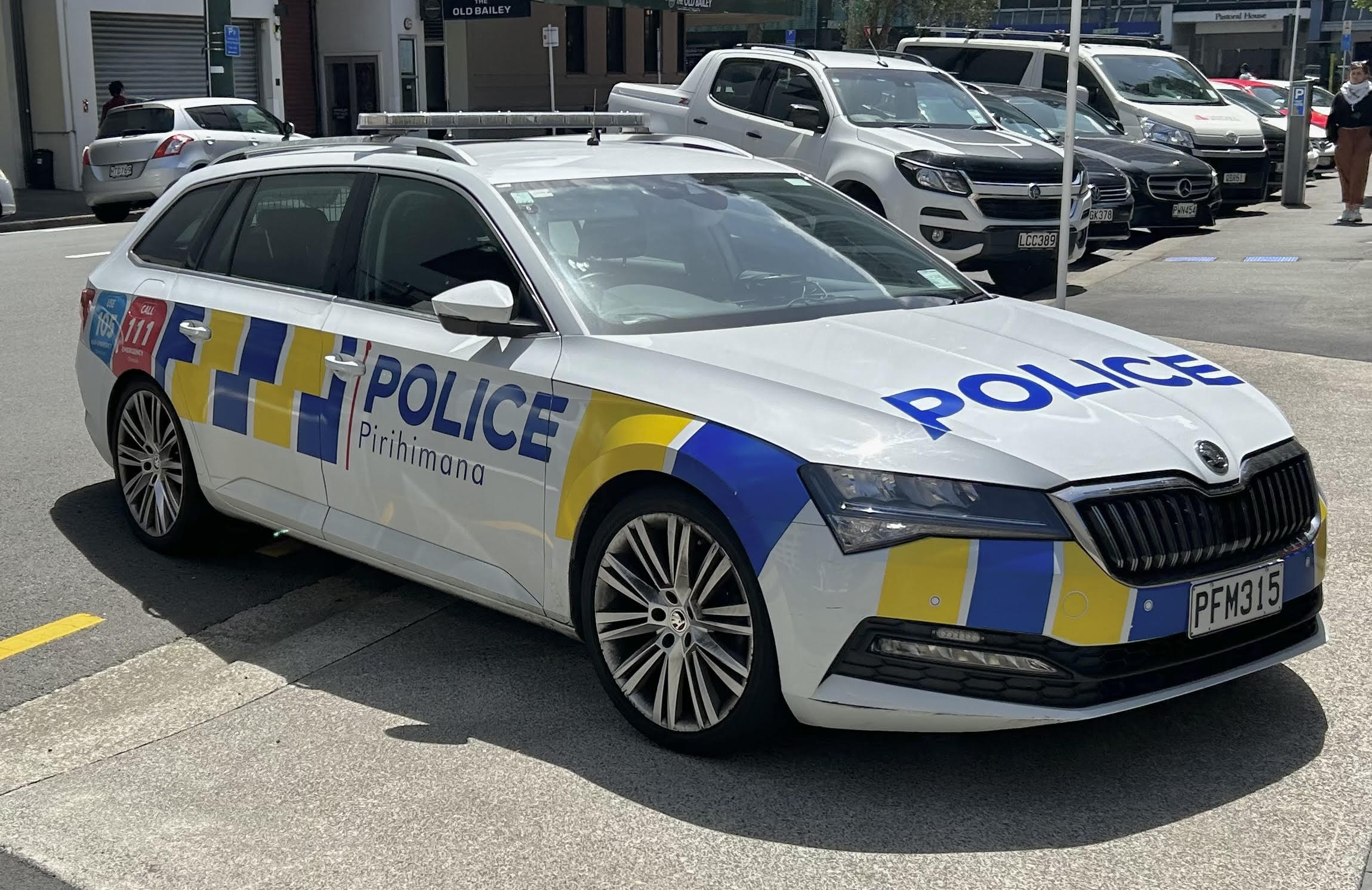
Škoda Superb

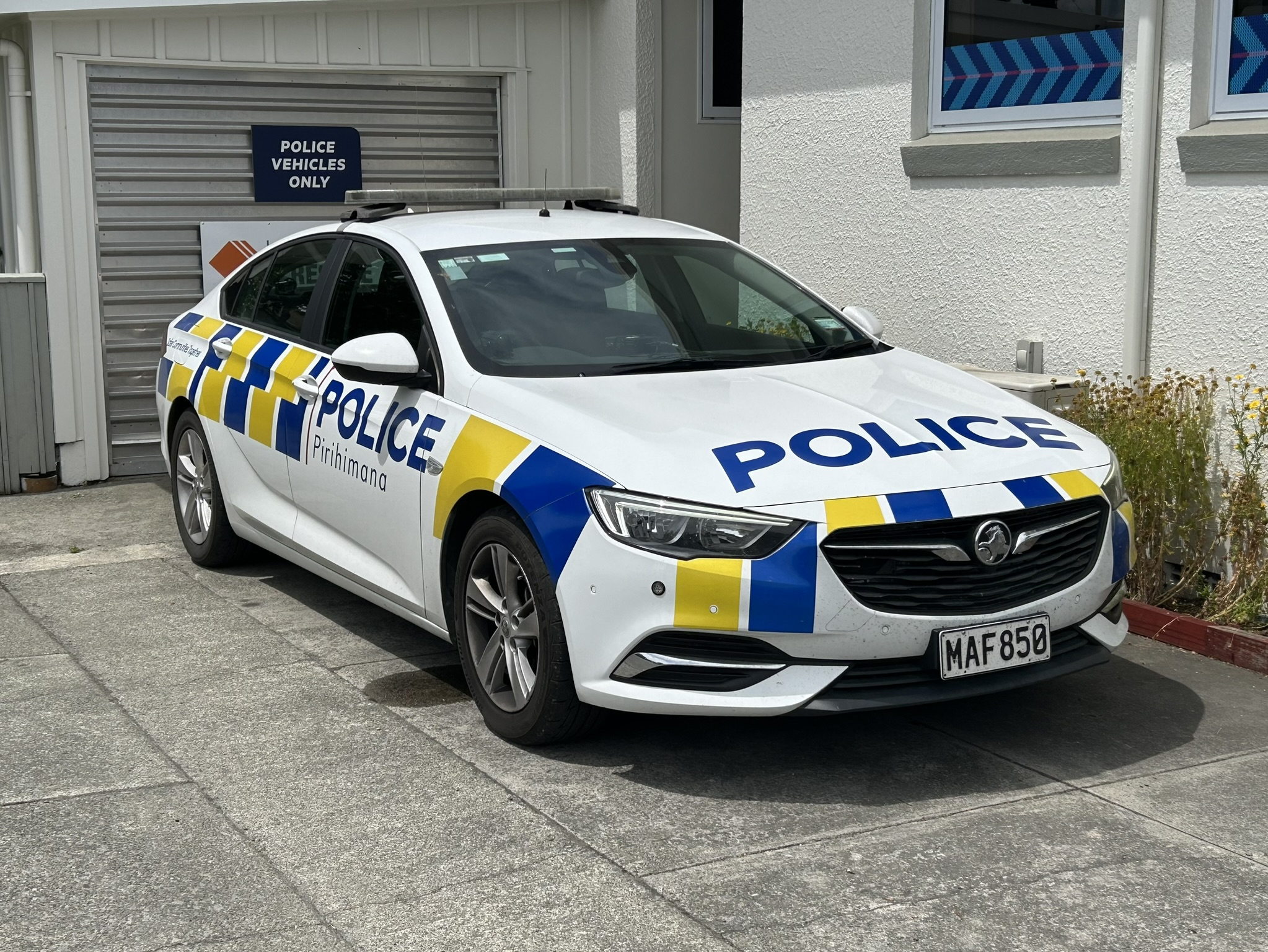
Holden Commodore ZB

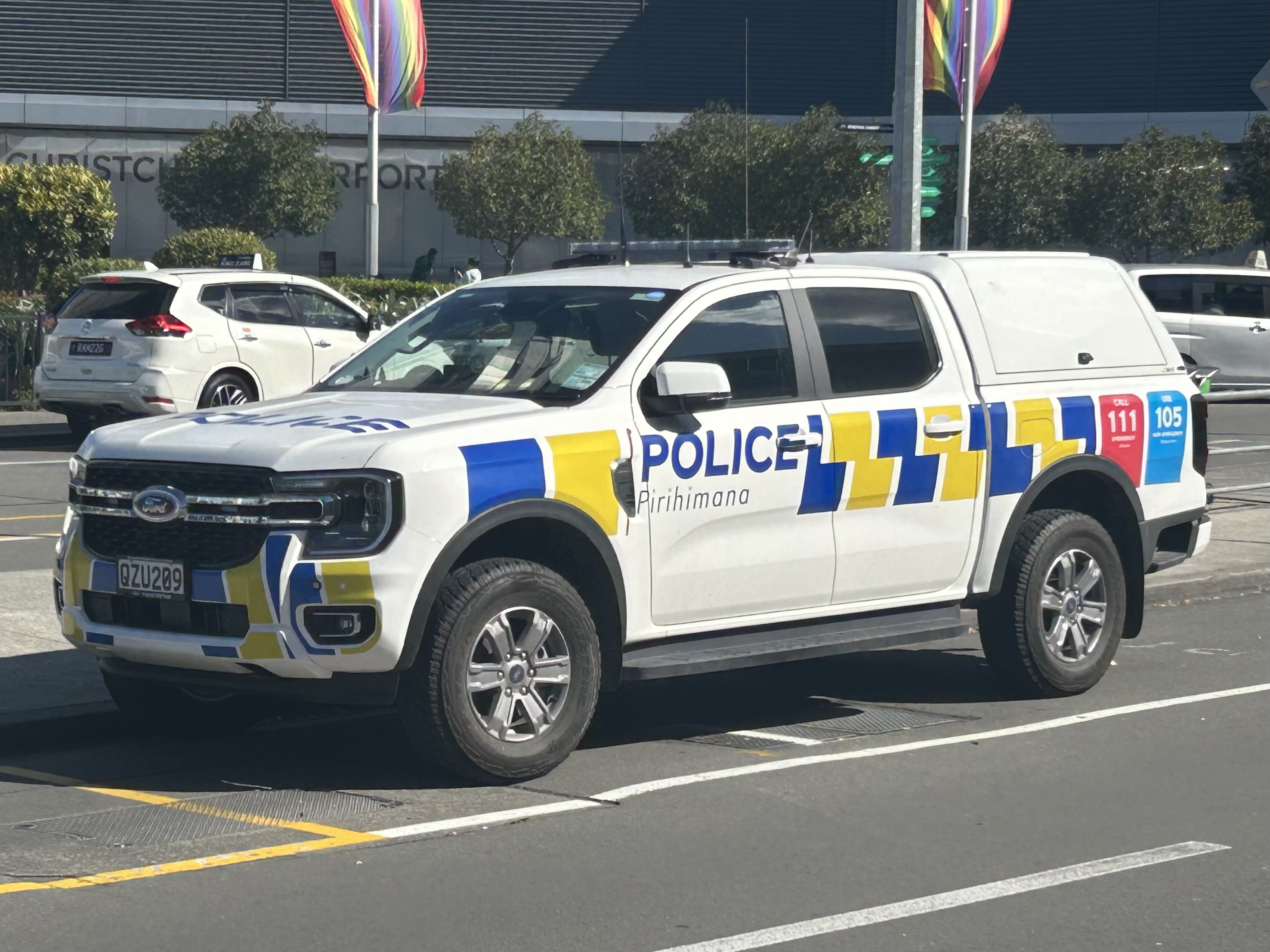
Ford Ranger

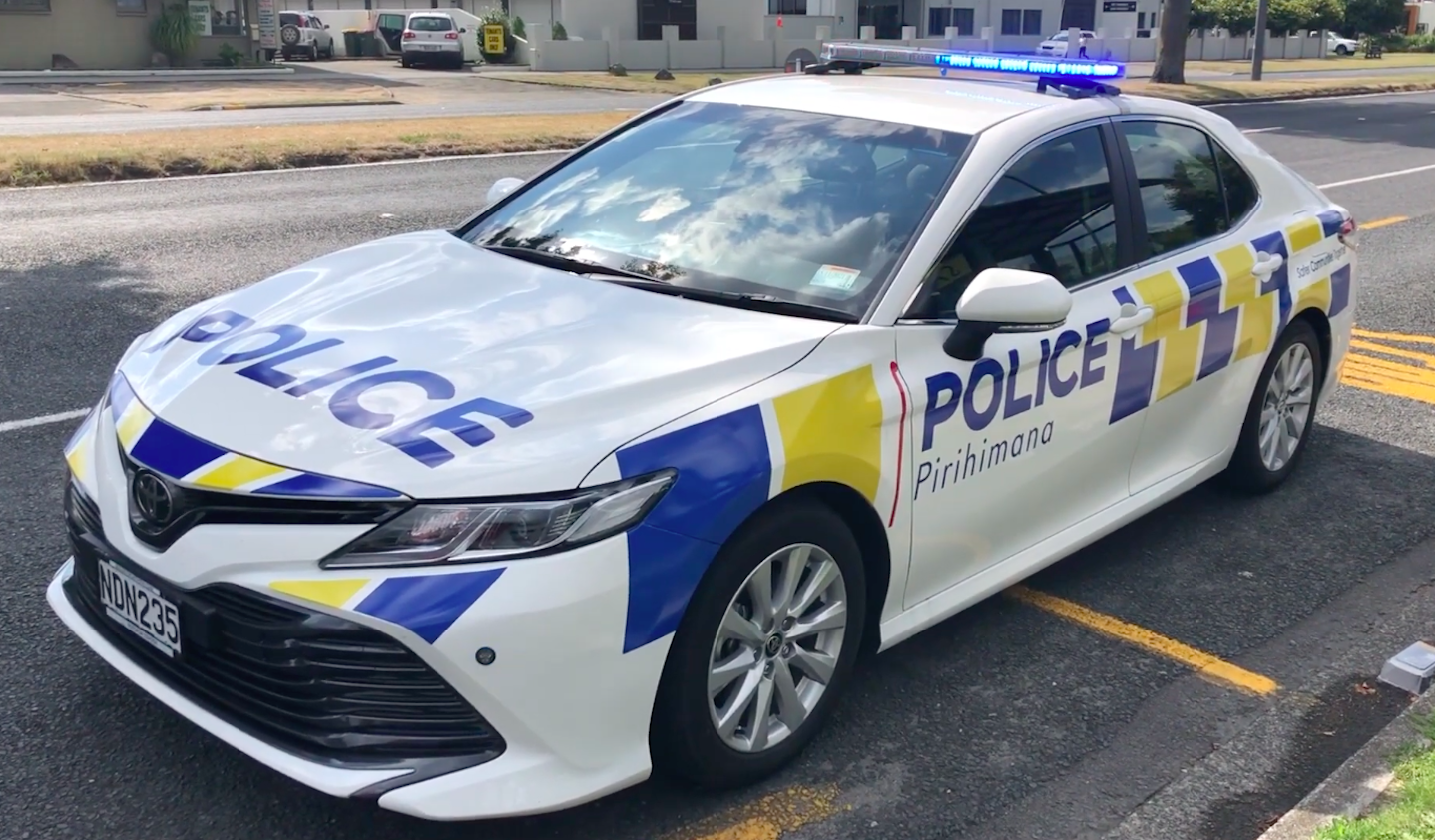
Toyota Camry

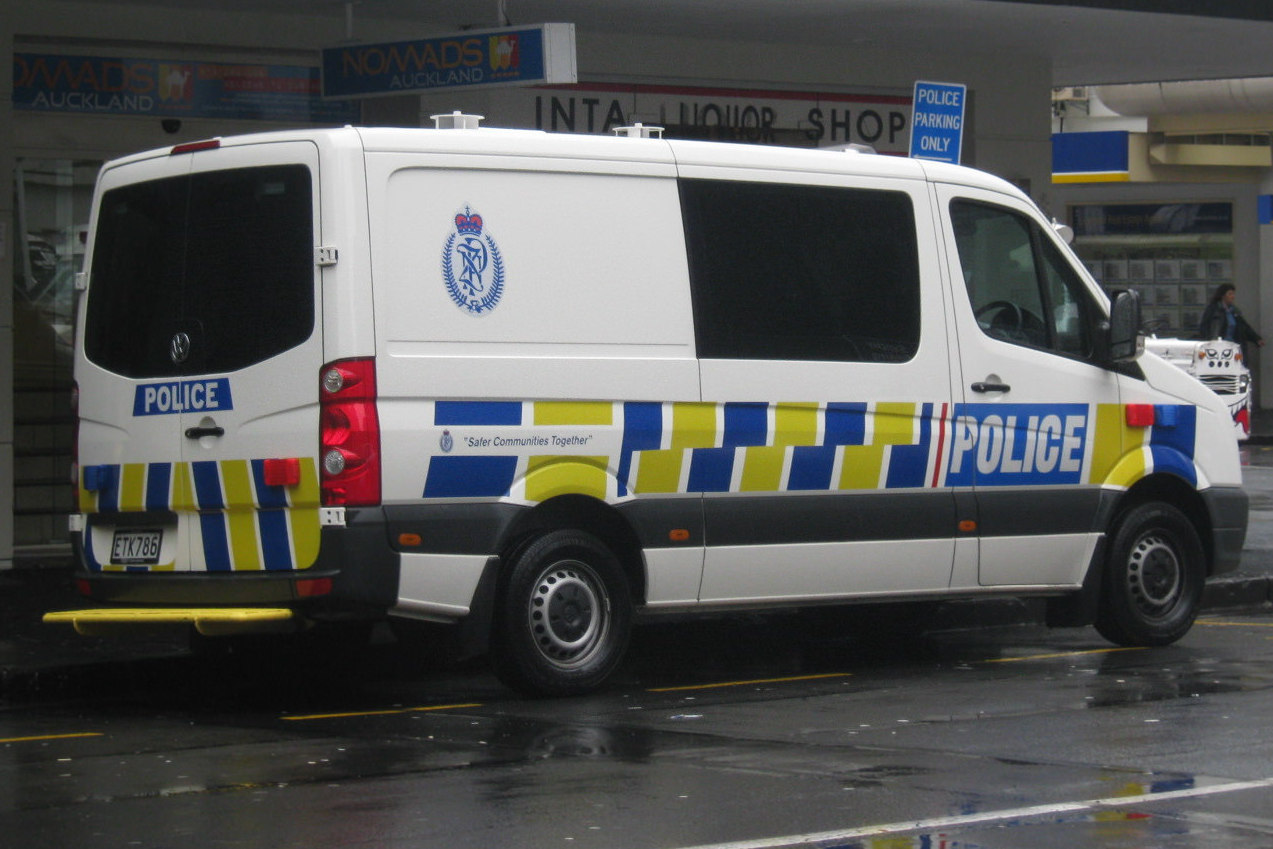
Volkswagen Crafter

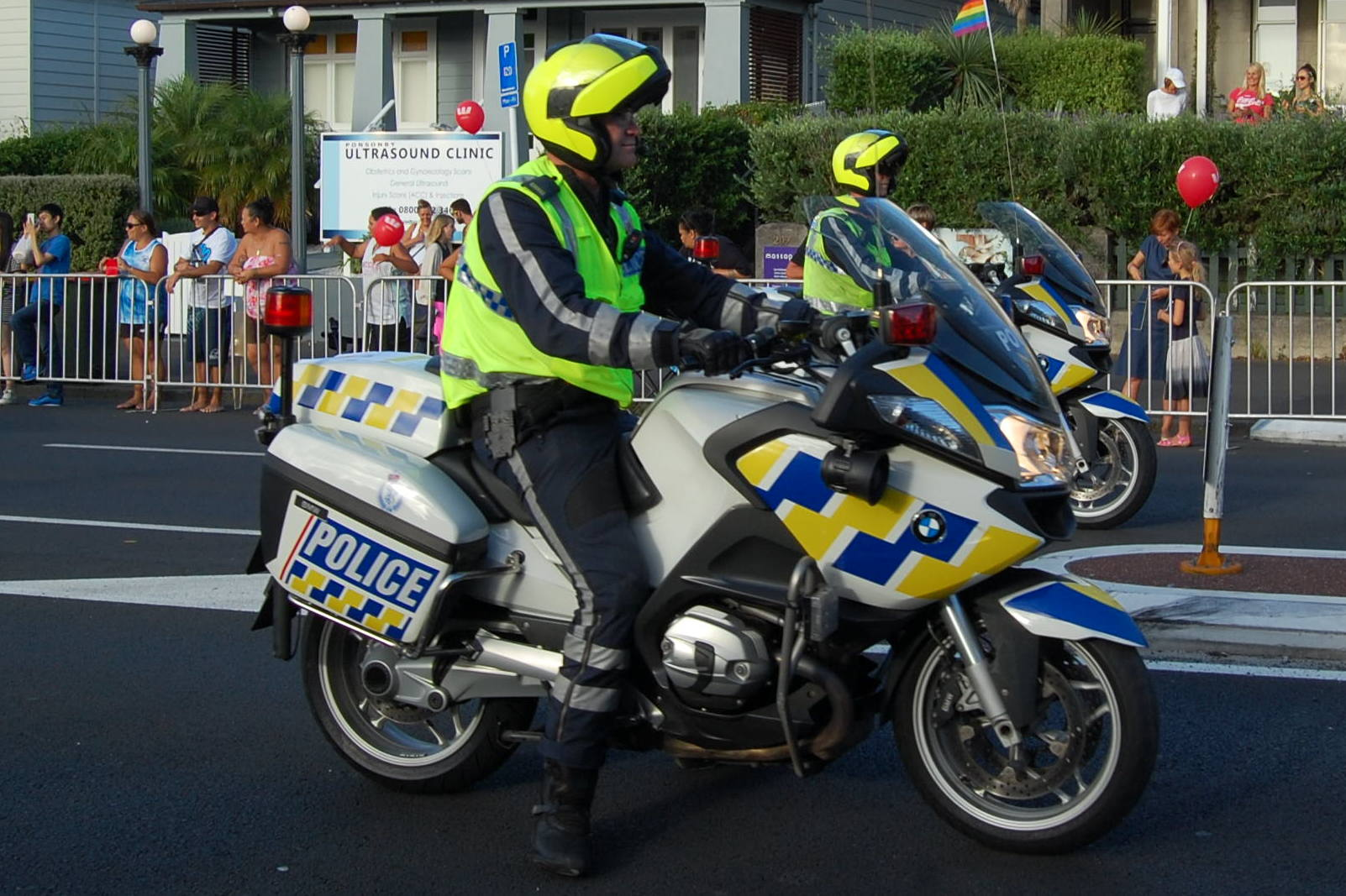
BMW R1200RT motorcycle

===== Current police vehicles in use =====
- Hyundai Ioniq 2022–Present
- Mitsubishi Triton 2022–Present
- Volkswagen Amarok 2024–Present
- Ford Ranger 2024–Present
- BMW i4 2023–Present
- Škoda Superb 2021–Present
- Škoda Kodiaq 2021–Present
- Holden Equinox 2020–Present
- Holden Acadia 2019–Present
- Toyota Landcruiser 2001–Present
- Toyota Highlander 2004–Present
- Toyota Hilux 2015–Present
- Holden Cruze 2014–Present
- Holden Captiva 2009–Present
- Holden Colorado 2006–Present
- Toyota Camry 2006–Present
- Holden Commodore 1980–Present
- Mercedes Sprinter 2015–Present
- Volkswagen Crafter 2008–Present

===== Previous police vehicles used =====
- Humber Super Snipe 1938–1960
- Vauxhall Velox 1950–1962
- Ford Zephyr 1954–1967
- Holden Standard/Special 1958–1968
- Vauxhall Velox PB 1962–1965
- Ford Falcon 1962–2000
- Holden Kingswood 1968–1982
- Vauxhall 3.5 Cresta 1969
- Holden Belmont 1969–1987
- Leyland P76 1976–1978
- Mitsubishi V3000 1986–1989
- Land Rover Discovery - 1999-2001
- Nissan Patrol 2005–2013

===== Current police motorcycles =====
- Yamaha MT-09 Tracer, Yamaha FJR1300AP 2021–Present
- BMW R1150, BMW R1200 2000–current
- Honda ST1300 2014–Present

===== Previous police motorcycles =====
- BSA 650 Police Special 1969–1971
- Triumph Trophy 650 1970s
- Norton Commando 750 1970s
- Various Japanese and European motorcycles including Yamaha, Suzuki, Kawasaki, BMW 1979–2000

=== Weapons ===
New Zealand Police officers carry OC spray (pepper spray), batons and Tasers (stun guns). The only officers who routinely carry firearms are members of the Dignitary Protection Squad, and international airport units. All officers are trained to use Glock 17 pistols and Bushmaster XM15 M4A3 Patrolman AR-15 type, semi-automatic rifles and wear a holster attachment in case they do need a pistol. Since 2012, frontline vehicles have had a locked box in the passenger foot-well containing two loaded and holstered Glock 17s and, in the rear of the vehicle, a locked case with two Bushmaster rifles and ballistic vests. Vehicles are fitted with alarms in case windows are broken. Each officer carries vehicle keys and safe keys.

The Police Association claims the carrying of handguns is inevitable. In January 2013, a Waikato officer was attacked by at least five men after he deployed his OC spray and Taser. His radio was taken from him and his pistol was 'misplaced' during the attack. The Police Association's request for routine carrying of firearms for all officers after this incident was dismissed by the Police Commissioner. The current firearm training and issuing policy has been criticised. Not all police officers receive regular firearm training and not all vehicles contain a firearm. In October 2015, unarmed officers at a routine police checkpoint at Te Atatū South who pursued a vehicle that sped off from the checkpoint were shot at from the offender's vehicle. In December 2015, the Police Association referred to the incident while requesting that all frontline officers receive firearm training and that their vehicles contain a secured firearm. This was rejected.

In July 2015, the Police Commissioner announced that Tasers would be routinely carried by police officers. Tasers were first trialled in 2006 and in 2010 were rolled out throughout New Zealand with all frontline vehicles containing an X26 or X2 Taser in a locked box. As of February 2024 police have begun rolling out the new Taser 10 weapon system across the country to replace the outdated Taser X2. In 2012, figures showed that a 'disproportionate number of people' targeted by police Tasers were mental health patients.

Police officers receive regular Police Integrated Tactical Training (PITT) with different levels of training, depending upon an officer's role and responsibilities. In 2017, a training model was introduced, and the number of officers trained as so-called 'Level 1 responders' increased to 79%. Level 1 includes training with pistols, rifles, Tasers, defensive tactics, handcuffs, OC spray and batons. In 2019, Level 1 responder live-fire training and simunitions training increased by 50%. Police annually release a report of their use of force including OC spray, Tasers and firearms.

==== Armed Response Team ====
Starting on 28 October 2019 the Armed Response Team (ART) was a trial ran by the New Zealand Police, similar to the UK Armed Response Vehicle model of 'routinely armed' officers on the streets ready to support the frontline. Then Commissioner of police Mike Bush cited the 2019 Christchurch Mosque Attack and a rise in organised crime as reasons for the trial. The ART vehicles were often crewed by four Armed Offenders Squad (AOS) officers who dealt with high risk situations. The staff were described by police as well trained and well equipped. During the trial the ARTs were involved in over 8000 events with around 200 of these being firearm events, no ART member ever fired their gun.

The trial ended on 26 April 2020 and on 9 June 2020, when then Commissioner of police Andrew Coster announced that the police would be scrapping their armed response teams after public feedback and consultation with the Māori and Pasifika communities. Public discussion around the armed response teams was influenced by concerns about police-community relations in light of the murder of George Floyd, which sparked protests around the world including New Zealand.

=== Stab Resistant Vests ===
In 2006 the New Zealand Police introduced stab-resistant vests, police used the Stab Resistant Body Armour (SRBA) and the ballistic Hard Armour Plate (HAP) used during firearm events as a ballistic cover plate. The SRBA was dark blue with police being written largely across the back with Sillitoe tartan markings above. On the front the police emblem and police was written much smaller on the left side over the heart with the Sillitoe tartan markings being shorter and across both lower shoulders. There were also two pouches over the stomach one on the left and one on the right with almost all tactical equipment being held on a duty belt. The stab-resistant vests were seen as a massive success and the SRBA was used until its replacement by the Body Armour System (BAS) in 2019. The BAS are a big upgrade with better stab-resistant technology, the ability to fit ballistic Hard Armour Plates into the vest instead of having to wear an additional vest for ballistic protection and better ability to customise the vest layout of tactical equipment. The BAS looks similar to the SRBA with only subtle differences including the removal of the two pouches over the stomach being replaced with small straps that allow for any tactical equipment wanted to be stored on the vest instead of a duty belt and a new font for the police markings.

== Notable incidents ==
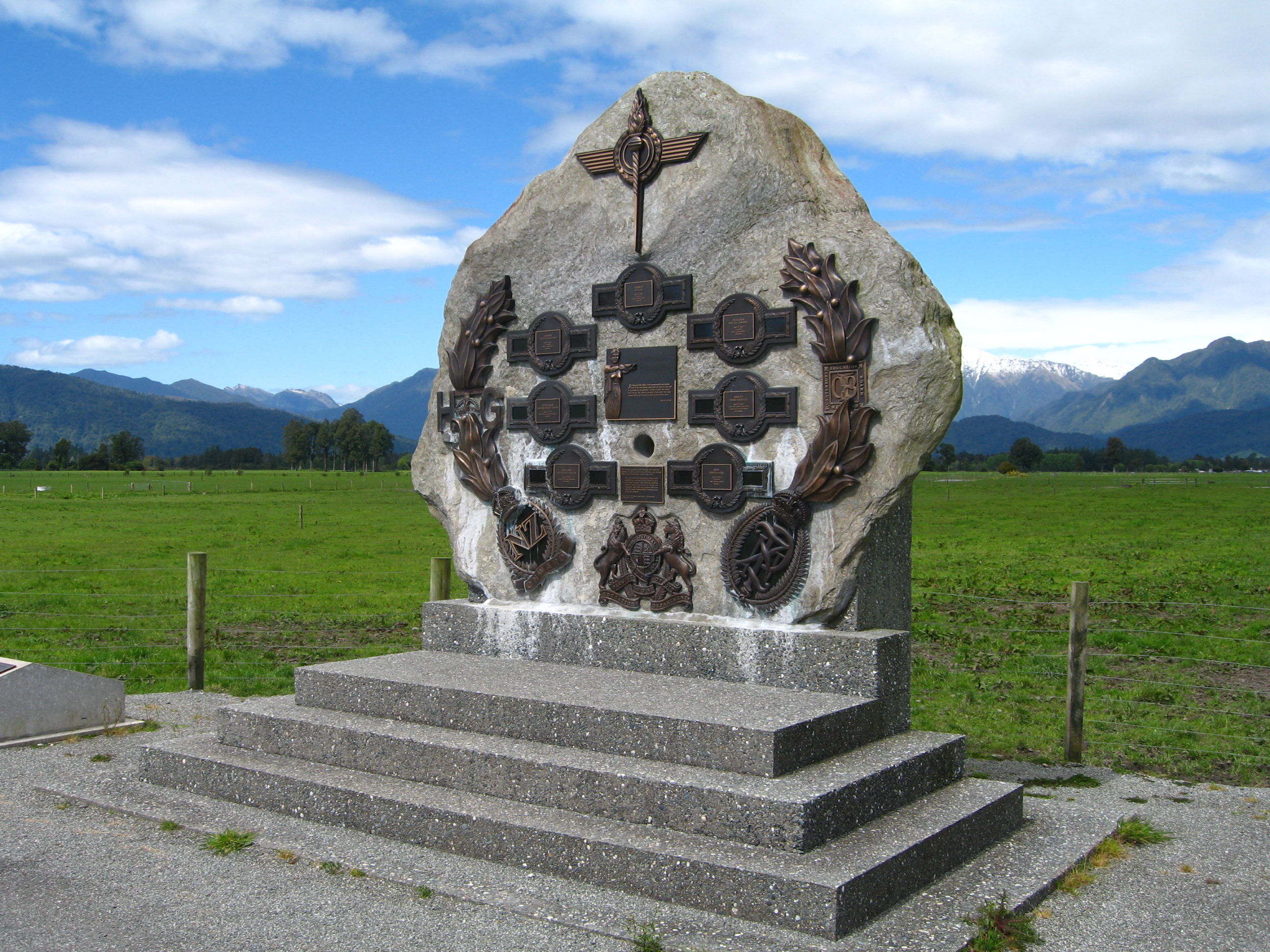
Memorial for the Kowhitirangi Incident

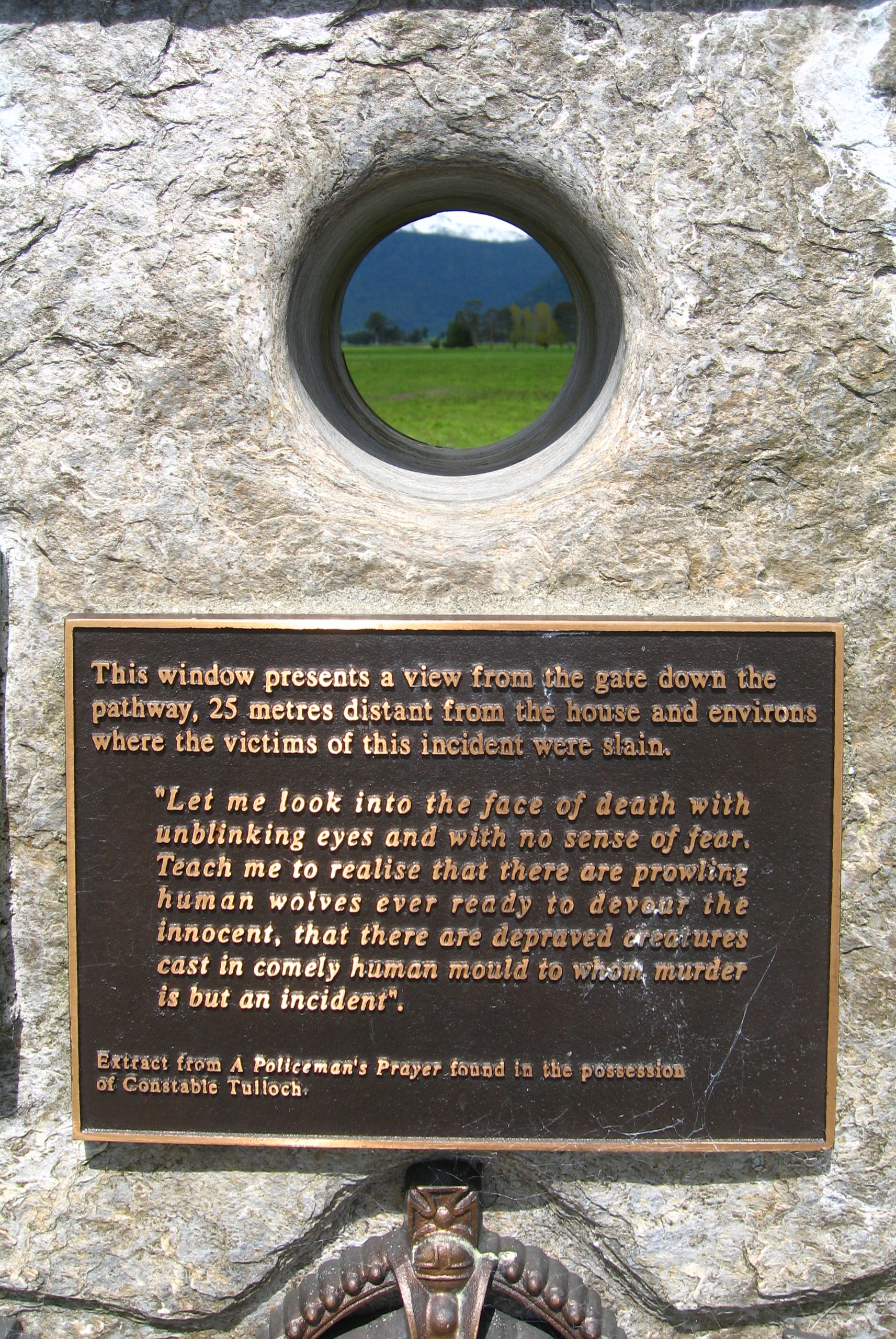
Detail of the memorial

On 8 October 1941, four police officers were killed by South Island farmer Stanley Graham, 40, who fired at them as they attempted to seize arms from his West Coast home at Kowhitirangi. After widespread searches, two policemen and a local civilian saw Graham carrying his rifle and ammunition belts on 20 October. He was shot by Constable James D'Arcy Quirke with a .303 rifle, from a distance of 25 metres, while crawling through a patch of scrub. He died early the next morning in Westland Hospital, Hokitika.

The police investigation into the murders of Harvey and Jeanette Crewe in 1970 was a turning point in the public's perception of the police. A royal commission subsequently found that the police had planted evidence and framed Arthur Allan Thomas for the murder. Writer Keith Hunter believes this introduced "a cynicism (in attitudes towards the police) that infects us today."

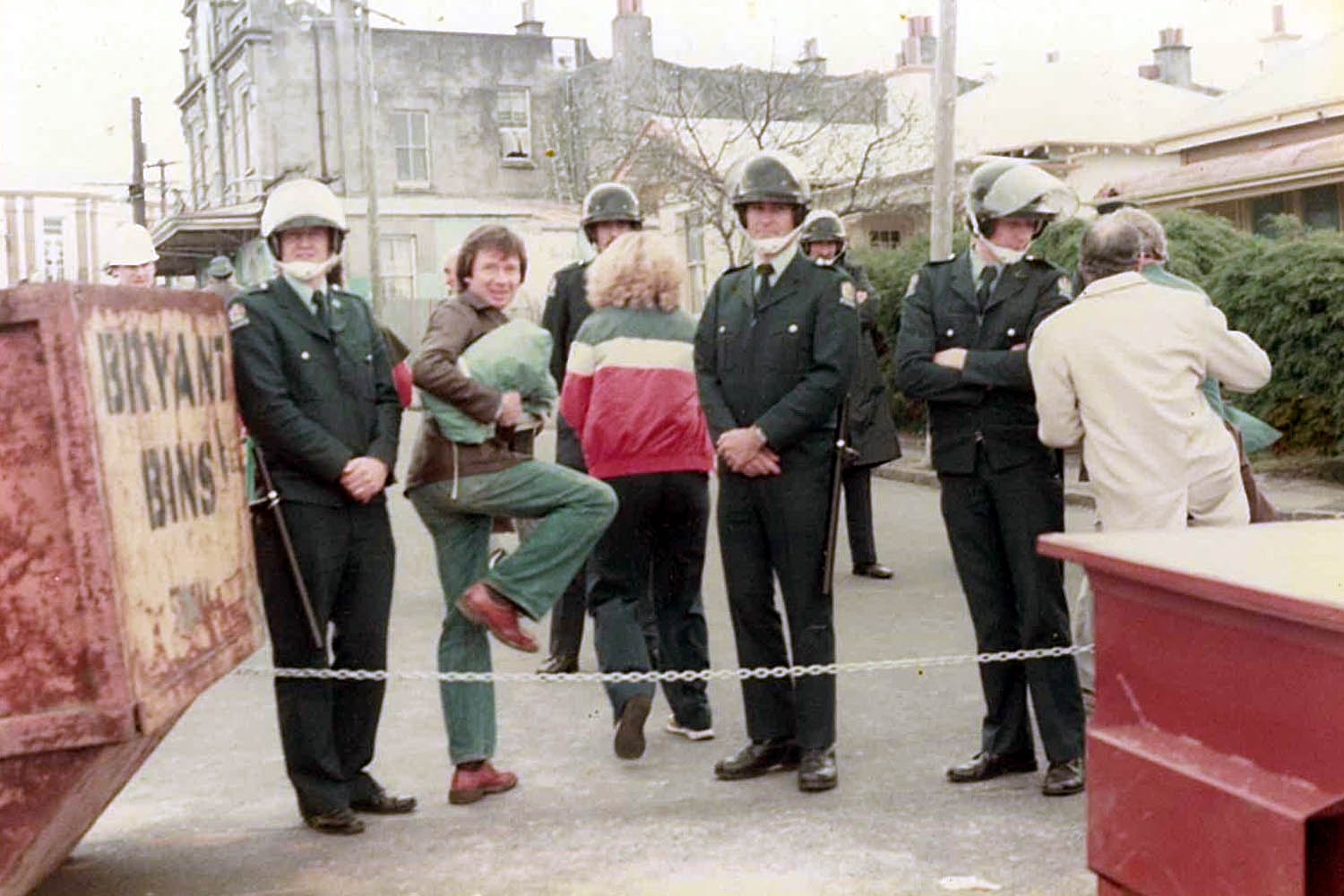
Police officers at an entrance to Eden Park during the 1981 Springbok tour

During the 1981 Springbok tour, the police formed three riot squads known as Red Squad, Blue Squad and White Squad to control anti-apartheid protesters who laid siege to rugby union fields where the touring team was playing. Police were described as being heavy-handed with their batons as they tried to 'subdue' protesters opposed to the Springbok tour. The tour had a significant effect on public perceptions of the police who since this time "have never been viewed with the same general benign approval".

In July 1985, the New Zealand Police arrested two French Action Service operatives after the Rainbow Warrior was bombed and sunk in Auckland harbour. The rapid arrest was attributed to the high level of public support for the investigation.

In October 2007 at least 17 people were arrested in a series of raids under the Suppression of Terrorism Act and the Arms Act 1983. The raids targeted a range of political activists allegedly involved in illegal firearms activity. The case dragged on for nearly four years and cost taxpayers millions of dollars. Much of the surveillance evidence was found to have been gained illegally and charges against all but four defendants were dropped. The remaining four were charged with firearms offences, found guilty and sentenced to terms of imprisonment and home detention.

On 20 January 2012, the police flew in by helicopter and arrested Kim Dotcom and three others in Coatesville, Auckland, in an armed raid on Dotcom's house following United States cybercrime indictments against him for on-line piracy via his internet file sharing company, Megaupload. Assets worth $17 million were seized including eighteen luxury cars, giant screen TVs and works of art. According to Dotcom, about 80 police officers were involved in the operation; the New Zealand police claimed it was between 20 and 30. The incident became controversial when a district court judge ruled that the warrants issued for the property seizures were invalid and it turned out the Government Communications Security Bureau (GCSB) had broken the law when asked by police to spy on Dotcom.

== Police and civilian deaths ==
=== Police killed on duty ===
Since 1 September 1886, 34 police officers have been killed by criminals.

A member of the New Zealand Police, Sergeant Stewart Graeme Guthrie, was the last New Zealand civilian recipient of the George Cross, which is awarded for conspicuous gallantry. He fired a warning shot near a gunman at Aramoana on 13 November 1990, but was killed by a return shot from the gunman, who also killed twelve others. As of January 2025, 34 police officers have been killed by criminal acts, and about 17 by accident, while in the performance of their official duties. The most recent police officer to be killed in the line of duty was Senior Sergeant Lyn Fleming, who was struck by a vehicle in "an unprovoked and senseless act" early New Years Day 2025.

=== Civilian deaths involving police ===
In June 2012 the Independent Police Conduct Authority (IPCA) released a comprehensive report on deaths in police custody. There were 27 deaths in the last ten years – ten of which were suicides. Seven deaths occurred when police were overly vigorous in the use of restraint. Another seven were "caused by the detainee's medical condition" which got dramatically worse in police custody, and three deaths were drug related when police failed to ascertain the detainees were on drugs. Of the 27 deaths, the IPCA said only four "involved serious neglect of duty or breaches of policy by police". On top of deaths in custody, police have shot and killed seven people in the last ten years. One was an innocent bystander, and another two were not carrying firearms but were carrying other weapons. The police were exonerated in all seven cases.

Numerous people have also died in collisions during or shortly after police car chases. In the five years after December 2003, 24 people died and 91 received serious injuries in police pursuits. Over this period, the IPCA made numerous recommendations to change police protocols, but the death rate continued to climb. In 2010, 18 drivers fleeing police were killed. Fourteen of the deaths were triggered by pursuits over minor offences rather than serious crimes. That year police conducted the fourth review of pursuit policy in six years and ignored key recommendations of the Independent Police Conduct Authority making only minor changes to the policy. Over the next 12 months, 15 drivers died in the course of police pursuits. 14% of pursuits result in a crash either by the police or the offender but police guidelines do not provide a predetermined speed at which officers should pull out of a pursuit. The IPCA has now recommended that pursuit policy would should require officers to "state a reason for beginning a pursuit," and recommended compulsory alcohol and drug testing of police officers involved in fatal incidents.

== Counter-terrorism and military assistance ==
Since 2005 the NZ Police's main counterterrorism and threat assessment group is the National Security Investigations Team, previously known as the Special Investigation Group. The NSIT is composed of four teams in regional centres, with a remit that covers early intervention in cases of extremism, soliciting informants, and building relationships with communities. Public information on the NSIT was released in relation to criticism of its handling of right wing terrorism in the lead up to the Christchurch terror attack.

The NZ Police are accountable for the operational response to threats to national security, including terrorism. If an incident escalates to a level where their internal resources are unable to adequately deal with the issue (for example, a major arms encounter or a significant terrorist threat), the Police Incident Controller may call on extra assistance from the New Zealand Defence Force and in particular NZ's Special Forces, the military focused New Zealand Special Air Service and terrorism focused Commando Squadron (D Squadron). Control of the incident remains with police throughout. As of 2009, the two military counter terrorist units have never been deployed in a domestic law-enforcement operation. Military resources such as Light Armoured Vehicles have been used and requested before, such as during the Napier shootings, and Royal New Zealand Air Force helicopters from No. 3 Squadron are often used to assist in search and rescue and cannabis eradication operations.

In 1964, the Armed Offenders Squad (AOS) was created to provide a specialist armed response unit, similar to the Metropolitan Police Service's SC&O19 in the United Kingdom. In addition to the AOS, the New Zealand Police maintain a full-time counter-terrorist unit, the Special Tactics Group (STG). Similar to the FBI's Hostage Rescue Team, the STG train in dynamic entry and other tactics vital in high-risk situations. The STG train with the SAS and are the last line of law enforcement response available before a police Incident Controller calls in support from the Defence Force.

== Crime statistics ==
Crime statistics are documented in the police annual report. The police also publish bi-yearly statistical summaries of crime for both New Zealand as a whole and each police district. In early 2005, crime statistics for both recorded crime and recorded apprehensions for the last 10 years were published by Statistics New Zealand. These statistics provide offence statistics related to individual sections of legislation and appear to be the most detailed national crime statistics available today.

== Controversies ==
Throughout its history, the New Zealand Police has been the subject of a number of controversies. Some have been investigated by the Independent Police Conduct Authority; others have received significant publicity.

- Wrongful conviction of Arthur Allan Thomas, 1971
- The Dawn raids, racially targeted immigration crackdown, 1973-1979
- Response to the 1981 Springbok Tour
- Wrongful conviction of Alan Hall based on fabricated evidence, refusing the right to counsel, etc.
- 1989 Murder of Deane Fuller-Sandys and Leah Stephens
- Integrated National Crime Information System (INCIS) development
- Inadequate communications centre response, 2004
- Dame Margaret Bazley's inquiry into historical sexual misconduct by police, 2004
- Failures to investiate Wairarapa sexual abuse cases,
- Covert spying on the public and activist groups, 2008
- Raid on Kim Dotcom as part of an international investigation into Megaupload, 2012
- Inhumane treatment of youths held in police detention, 2012
- The 2014 raid on Nicky Hager over his book, Dirty Politics
- Constable Vili Taukolo convicted of corruption, acting as a paid informant for organised crime, leading to the formation of the Police National Integrity Unit in 2020.
- Use of excessive force against, and the wrongful detention of Daniel Bond, 2019
- The 2019 death of Allen Ball while in custody
- Racially targeted warrantless photos of Māori youth, 2021
- Use of controversial CIPEM interview technique to ellicit false confessions in multiple homicide investigations, 2019-2021
- Failure to prevent the murder of Farzana Yaqubi at the hands of a stalker in 2022
- 2022 Wellington protest and occupation of Parliament
- Violations of the United Nations Convention Against Torture, including the death of Alo Ngata, 2022
- Officer involved in public indecency incident at Paremata train station, 2024
- Alleged sexual misconduct by Deputy Commissioner Jevon McSkimming, 2024-2025
- Possession of objectionable material by Deputy Commissioner Jevon McSkimming, 2025
- Over 100 officers falsifying 30,000 breath tests, 2025

== Notable NZP personnel ==
- Ross Ardern
- Mark Ball
- Chester Borrows
- Nicky Cooney
- Casey Costello
- Frank Guinness
- Ellen Halpenny
- Robert Henry
- Matthew Hunt
- Jeremy Kench
- Mark Mitchell
- Katie Perkins
- Tracy Phillips
- Tafua Maluelue Tafua

== See also ==
- Armed Offenders Squad
- Cook Islands Police Service
- Corruption in New Zealand
- Crime in New Zealand
- Crimes Act 1961
- Dignitary Protection Service
- Gangs in New Zealand
- Independent Police Conduct Authority
- Institute of Environmental Science and Research – provider of forensic services to NZ police
- New Zealand Police Negotiation Team
- Organised Crime Agency
- Policing Act 2008
- Royal New Zealand Police College
- Special Tactics Group
- New Zealand Customs Service
