= Special Tactics Group =

Anti-terrorism unit of New Zealand Police

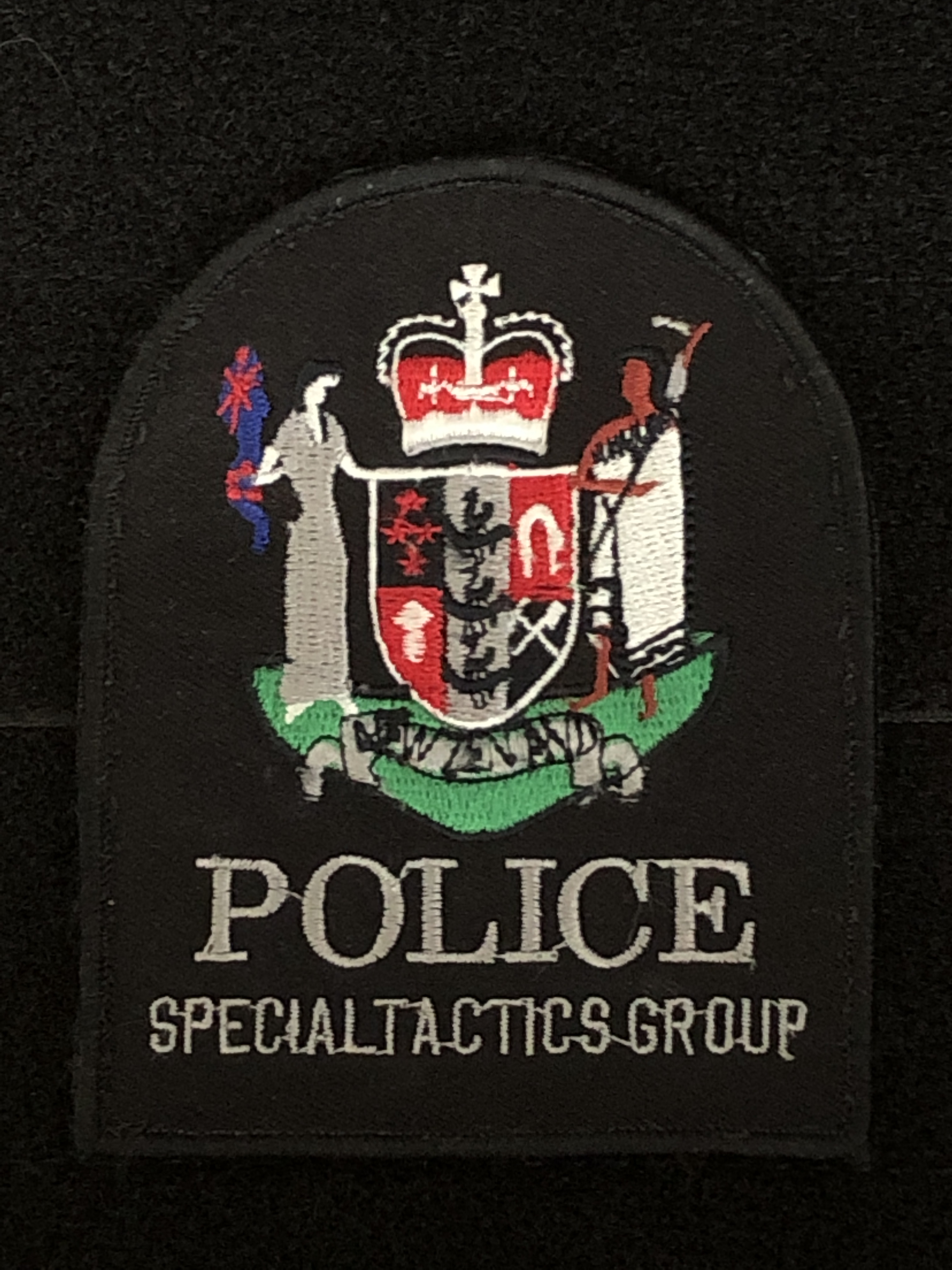
- STG patch
- Active: 1977 to 1991 (Anti-Terrorist Squad); 1991 to present (Special Tactics Group)
- Country: New Zealand
- Agency: New Zealand Police
- Type: Police tactical group
- Role: Law enforcement; Counter-terrorism
- Headquarters: Wellington
- Abbreviation: STG

Structure
- Operators: 39
- Sections: Auckland; Wellington; Christchurch

Notables
- Significant operation(s): Aramoana massacre; 2007 New Zealand anti-terror raids; Napier shootings; 2012 Megaupload arrests; Christchurch mosque shootings; 2021 Auckland supermarket stabbing; 2023 Auckland shooting

The Special Tactics Group (STG) is the full-time police tactical group of the New Zealand Police. The STG, originally named the Anti-Terrorist Squad (ATS), was established to respond to high-risk situations which are beyond the scope or capacity of everyday policing. STG officers directly support operational police in incidents, such as sieges, with specialist tactical, negotiation, intelligence, and command support services.

Officers are assigned to the STG on a full-time basis with sections based in Auckland, Wellington and Christchurch. In 2012, the STG became a police tactical group following the New Zealand government joining Australia’s national counter-terrorism coordination organisation.

== History ==
In 1977, the New Zealand Police formed the Anti-Terrorist Squad (ATS) a part-time national unit to respond to terrorist incidents. Training commenced in July 1977 for selected members of the Armed Offenders Squad (AOS). A section of the ATS was based in Wellington with smaller sections based in Auckland and Christchurch. Commissioner of Police John Jamieson sent the group in response to the Aramoana massacre in 1990. They located gunman David Gray and ended his spree. Group member Stephen Vaughan was shot in the ankle during the final shoot-out.

In 1991, the ATS was renamed the Special Tactics Group. The STG was tasked with additional roles. On 1 July 2003, the STG became a full-time group due to changes made by the New Zealand Police in response to worldwide terrorism-related events. In May 2009, the STG was involved in the Napier shootings alongside their colleagues in the Armed Offenders Squad. In March 2019, the STG responded to a terrorist attack at two mosques in Christchurch providing specialist first aid to the victims. The STG was coincidentally at a sniping course with international police at Burnham Military Camp in Christchurch and armed operators from Australian police tactical groups also responded to the attack at the Al Noor mosque. In September 2021, two STG operators fatally shot an "ISIS-inspired" terrorist following a stabbing attack at a Countdown supermarket in Auckland.

== Role ==
The STG deals with armed incidents that are beyond the capability of the part-time Armed Offenders Squad, of which they are also members. While the Armed Offenders Squad is trained to cordon or contain high risk situations such as sieges, the Special Tactics Group is trained to resolve them. The group also provides specialist protection to high risk persons and VIPs. The STG is supported during its operations by the Armed Offenders Squad, Police Negotiation Teams and canine units trained for use in situations involving firearms.

The group is known to train with New Zealand Special Air Service of which little public information is released as well as with Australian police tactical groups.

The STG has provided specialist armed officers for overseas operations such as the Regional Assistance Mission to the Solomon Islands (RAMSI), working alongside officers from the Australian Federal Police. The STG has deployed to Australia to assist Australian police tactical groups with security at major events including the 2007 APEC meeting in Sydney and the 2014 G20 summit in Brisbane. STG have been part of all major security operations in New Zealand including the 1990 Commonwealth Games, the Commonwealth Heads of Government Meeting 1995, APEC meetings, royal and VIP tours. In 2012, the New Zealand Government entered into Australia's National Counter-Terrorism arrangement forming a co-operation partnership between the countries with the committee that oversees the agreement renamed to the Australia-New Zealand Counter-Terrorism Committee.

The STG works closely with No. 3 Squadron of the Royal New Zealand Air Force utilising their NH-90 helicopters for both training and operations including with fast roping. The New Zealand Police Air Support Unit also provides the STG with support with their Bell 429 GlobalRanger helicopters.

In 2017–18, the STG "were deployed 84 times".

== Requirements ==
Positions are open to current or past members of the Armed Offenders Squad. Officers must successfully complete the STG four-day selection course and three-week qualification course to gain selection to the unit. In 2007, the first woman passed the selection course.

== Equipment ==
In 2013, the STG was issued with non-lethal 40mm XM1006 sponge rounds that are fired from the HK69 grenade launcher.

In 2009, two New Zealand Army LAV III light armour vehicles were utilised in response to the Napier shootings. The STG has since conducted training exercises with the LAV III. In 2019, the STG took delivery of three ASC armoured Toyota Land Cruisers.

== See also ==
- List of police tactical units
