= Armed Offenders Squad =

Police squad in New Zealand

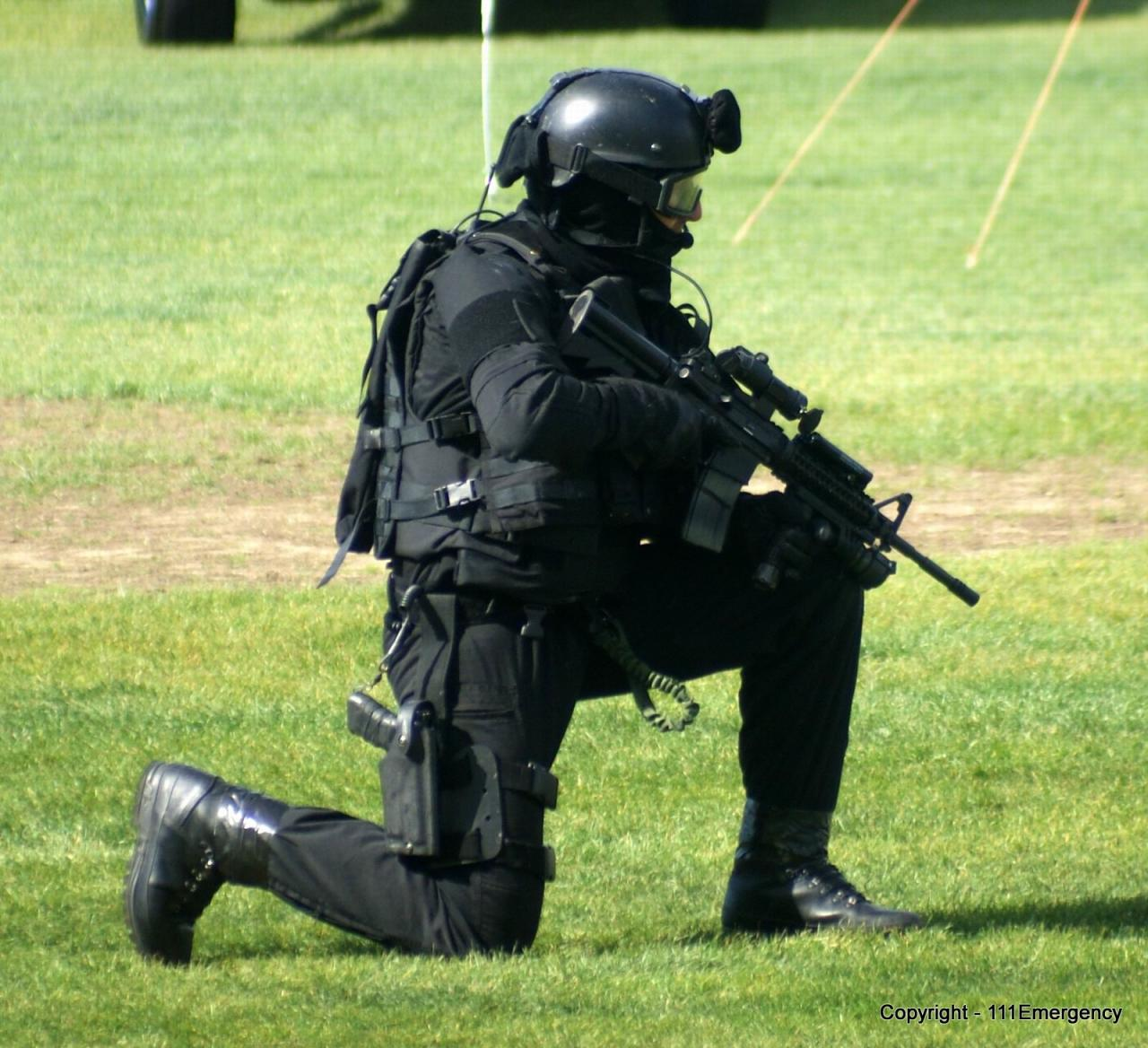
- AOS member in 2010
- Active: August 1964 – present
- Country: New Zealand
- Agency: New Zealand Police
- Type: Police tactical unit
- Role: Law enforcement; Counter-terrorism
- Headquarters: Wellington
- Abbreviation: AOS

Structure
- Officers: 320 part-time
- Squads: 17

Notables
- Significant operation(s): Aramoana massacre; 2007 police raids; Napier shootings; Christchurch mosque shootings; 2023 Auckland shooting

The Armed Offenders Squad (AOS) are specialist part-time units of the New Zealand Police based around the country available to respond to high risk incidents using specialist tactics and equipment.

The AOS was established when front-line police officers did not carry firearms. While today officers still do not routinely carry sidearms, they have ready access to firearms if required, including high-powered rifles, and receive firearms training. A new expanding role for the AOS is assisting with planned operations.

== History ==
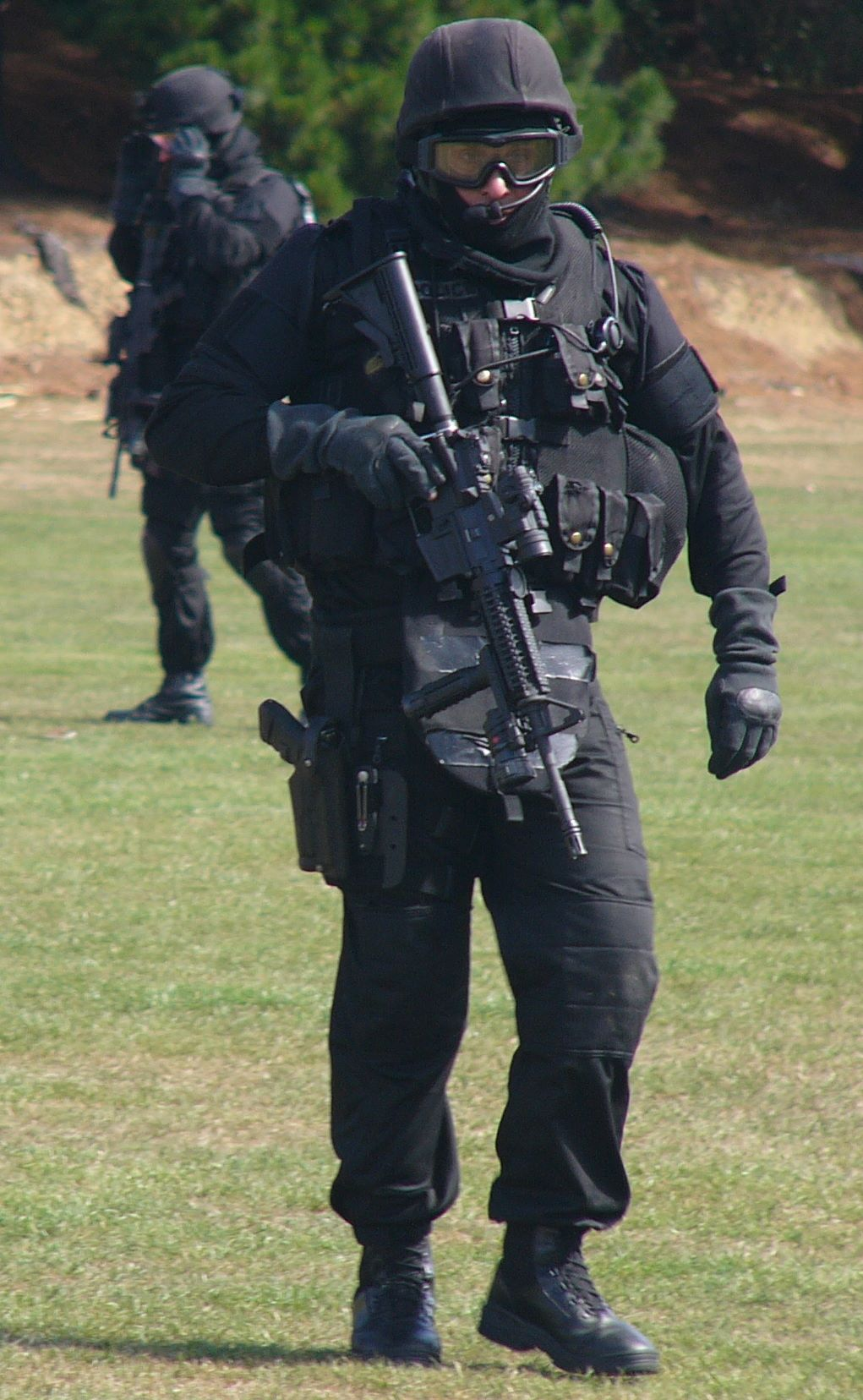
Wellington AOS member in 2008

In 1963, the unarmed New Zealand Police lost four police officers killed by lone gunmen in two separate firearms incidents at Waitakere, Auckland in January 1963 and at Lower Hutt, Wellington in February 1963. The detective Robert Josiah Walton (1920–2008) later Commissioner of Police who investigated the Waitakere killings recommended the creation of a unit to deal with armed offenders spending time with the New South Wales Police Emergency Squad. The AOS was formally started in August 1964 trained by the New Zealand Special Air Service (NZSAS) with the philosophy of "cordon, contain and appeal".

One of the highest-profile AOS interventions is their action during the Aramoana massacre on 13–14 November 1990, which involved at least 150 police officers. Officers from the Anti-Terrorist Squad, now known as the Special Tactics Group, were also present at the crisis. Sergeant Stewart Guthrie, an NCO in the AOS, was killed in the massacre, although he arrived alone with only a revolver, ahead of the fully equipped team from Dunedin.

On 15 October 2007, members of the AOS and the Special Tactics Group conducted several raids across New Zealand in response to the uncovering of alleged paramilitary training camps deep in the Urewera mountain ranges. Roughly 300 police were involved in the raids. Four guns and roughly 230 rounds of ammunition were seized and 17 people were arrested. According to the police the raids were a culmination of more than a year of surveillance that uncovered and monitored the training camps. The warrants were executed under the Summary Proceedings Act, the Terrorism Suppression Act, and the Arms Act. Raids were conducted in Wellington, Christchurch, Taupō and Tauranga. Allegations of New Zealand Police searching a school bus also surfaced.

The AOS were also involved in a shooting on a motorway in Auckland on 23 January 2009. A squad member accidentally shot and killed innocent teenager Halatau Naitoko as a gunman threatened a truck driver, and Naitoko was caught in the line of fire. A former police inspector called for the squad member who shot Naitoko to be charged while AOS training would be changed to avoid future incidents similar to the Naitoko case.

The AOS was involved in the 2009 Napier shootings with the Special Tactics Group. The AOS has fatally shot several people.

In November 2009, TV One screened a three part documentary Line of Fire.

During the 2019 Christchurch mosque shootings, the AOS arrived at the scene 10 minutes after the first emergency call was placed.

== Role ==
The mission of the AOS is to provide police with a means of effectively and safely responding to and resolving situations in which there is a risk of firearms or similarly dangerous weapons being involved, and when weapons are directed against either members of the public, or the police service. An incident may fall within the call out criteria of the Special Tactics Group with the AOS providing a cordon and containment response.

Deployments can be either emergency call outs or planned operations. Between 1996 and 2009, the AOS conducted an average of 513 deployments a year. In 2010–2011, this increased to 992 as the AOS was involved in more planned operations such as assisting in drug raids on clandestine labs and executing search warrants. Planned operations now account for almost two-thirds of deployments. On average, shots are only fired once by the AOS for every 260 deployments.

== Structure ==
As of 2012, there are 17 squads throughout New Zealand covering all major population centres, with a total strength of around 320 members. Members are part-time, come from all branches of the New Zealand Police such as the Criminal Investigation Branch (CIB) or general duties, and operate on a call out basis. In the event of an incident requiring AOS attendance, the on-duty officers will be paged by the communications centre. They then assemble at their base, to draw arms and get other equipment, before responding to the scene.

Squad sizes range from between 12 and 30 members and the largest are based in Auckland, Wellington and Christchurch. In 2010–2011, Wellington had 175 deployments, followed by Auckland with 127 and Christchurch with 113.

The AOS is supported by Negotiation Teams and canine units specifically trained for use in situations involving firearms. There are 17 Negotiation Teams, with each AOS having a dedicated team attached to it. Similar to the AOS units themselves, the negotiators are all part-time volunteers.

Members receive additional pay above the regular police wage, an officer reported around $9,000 per year in 2008. As of March 2020 the average full-time equivalent salary of AOS and Special Tactics Group members is $97,469.

== Training ==
Volunteers for the AOS need to successfully complete a one-day local selection course, then a three-day national selection course, and if successful complete a three-and-a-half-week national qualification course. Members receive localised training given on a district level one day each month and have a three-day intensive refresher course each year. From the mid-1990s, women have passed and served in squads with six women in 2012 serving nationally.

AOS members are eligible to undertake selection for the elite full-time Special Tactics Group.

== Equipment ==
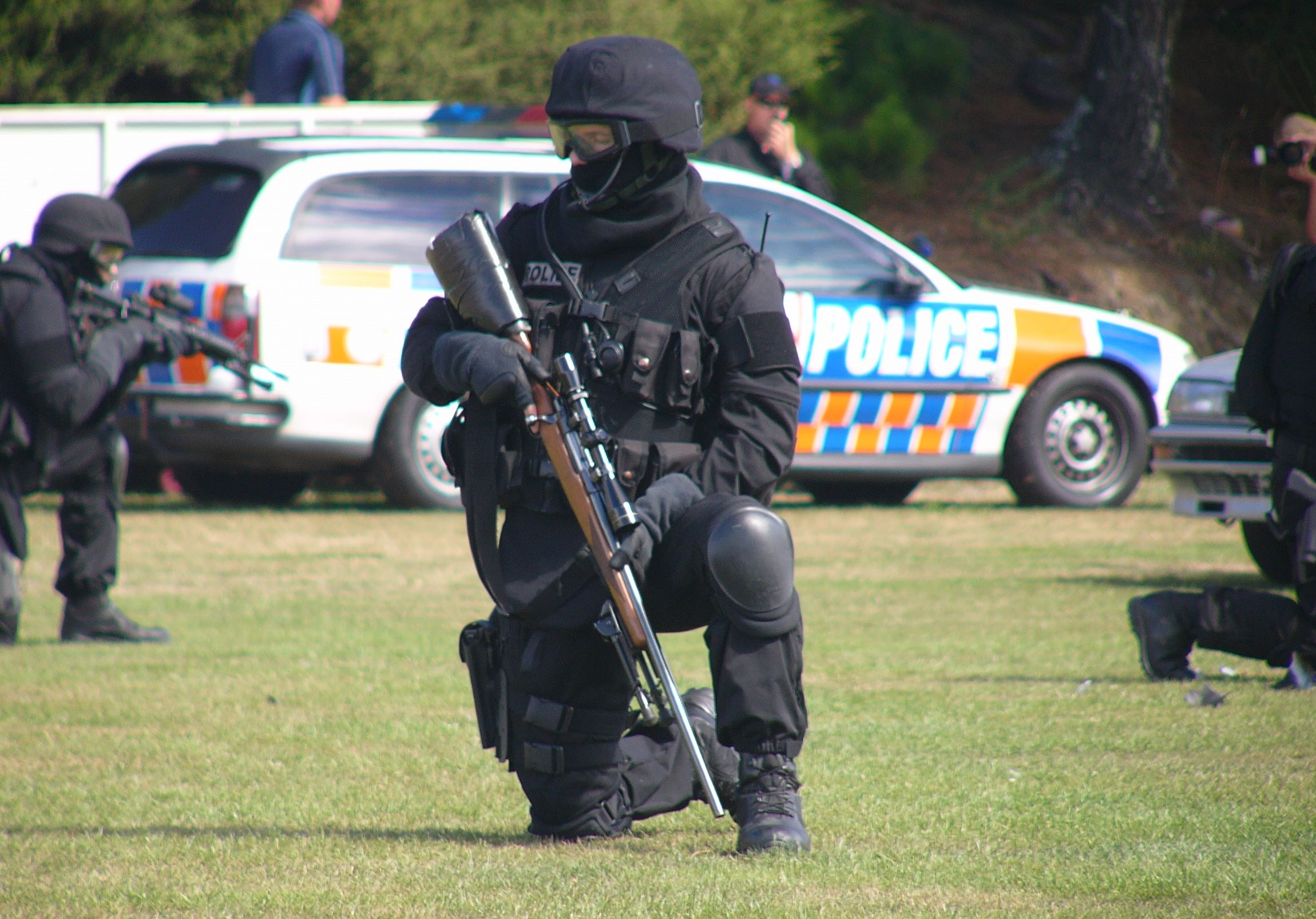
An AOS member armed with a sniper rifle in 2008

In keeping with the weapons available to front-line officers, the AOS are issued with the following equipment:

- Glock 17 pistol
- Bushmaster M4A3 carbine with multiple accessories installed such as Surefire Flashlights, Aimpoint and EOTech optics, front grips, and slings. Replaced by LMT MARS-L piston carbine
- 7.62mm Designated Marksman Rifle
- Remington 870 shotgun
- Heckler & Koch HK69A1 grenade launcher
- Accuracy International AW sniper rifle
- Tactical vests and Ballistic vests
- Kevlar helmets
- Ballistic shields
- Drop-leg holsters and magazine pouches (optional to the officer)

For deployment of CS gas, the Remington 870 shotgun and HK69A1 grenade launcher can be used while the shotgun may also apply for breaching purposes. In 2013, three AOS units Auckland, Wellington and Christchurch were issued with non-lethal 40mm XM1006 sponge rounds that are fired from the HK69 grenade launcher. In 2015, all AOS units were issued with sponge rounds.

When responding to incidents, or executing planned operations, AOS members use both standard marked and unmarked cars, and large four-wheel drive vehicles, such as the Nissan Patrol. These are fitted with running boards and roof rails, to allow officers to stand on the side while the vehicle is in motion, as well as having enclosed boxes on the roof for carrying equipment. In 2009, two New Zealand Army LAV III light armour vehicles were used in response to the Napier shootings.

== See also ==
- List of police tactical units
