= New Zealand Police Negotiation Team =

Police Negotiation Team
- Active: c. 1995 - present
- Country: New Zealand
- Agency: New Zealand Police
- Type: Law enforcement negotiation
- Abbreviation: PNT

Structure
- Negotiators: 145
- Teams: 17; Advanced Police Negotiation Team

Police Negotiation Team (PNT) are specialist part-time units of the New Zealand Police dedicated to crisis negotiation. Nationwide, there are 17 Police Negotiation Teams, with each Armed Offenders Squad (AOS) having a dedicated PNT attached to it. The negotiators are all part-time volunteers drawn from the ranks of the front line police and are specially trained in psychology and crisis resolution techniques.

As well as deploying to armed incidents with the AOS, they will also act as an independent unit and speak with suicidal people, offenders who have barricaded themselves in buildings, prison rioters, and kidnappers. They will also deploy overseas to provide support and advise to the New Zealand Ministry of Foreign Affairs and Trade when a New Zealand national has been kidnapped.

Police officers complete a two-week police negotiation course at the National Police College to become eligible to join an NPT. Police negotiators have monthly one day refresher training.

The PNT has a national Advanced Police Negotiation Team (APNT) to assist PNTs with major incidents.

== See also ==
- New Zealand Police
