= Terrorism in New Zealand =

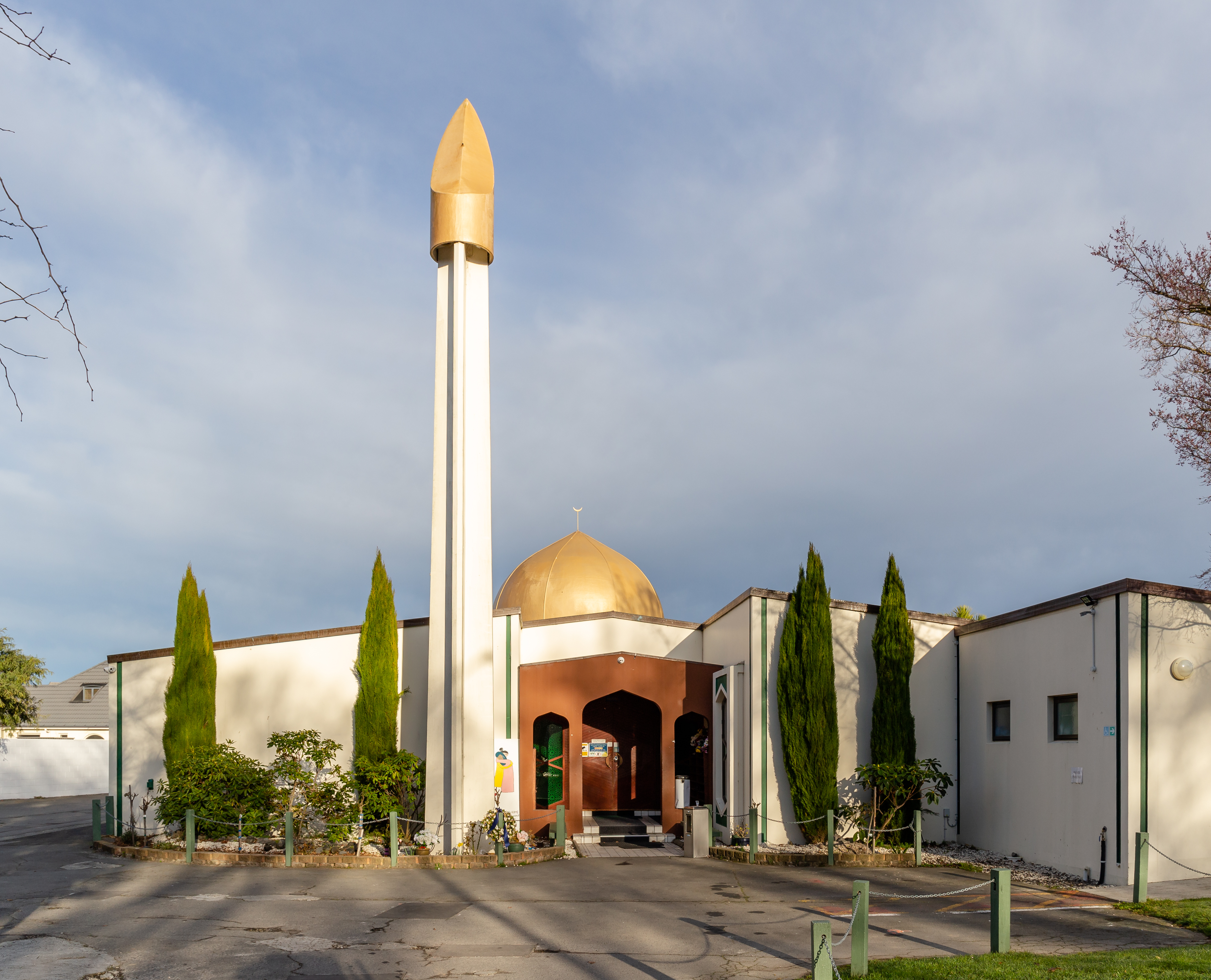
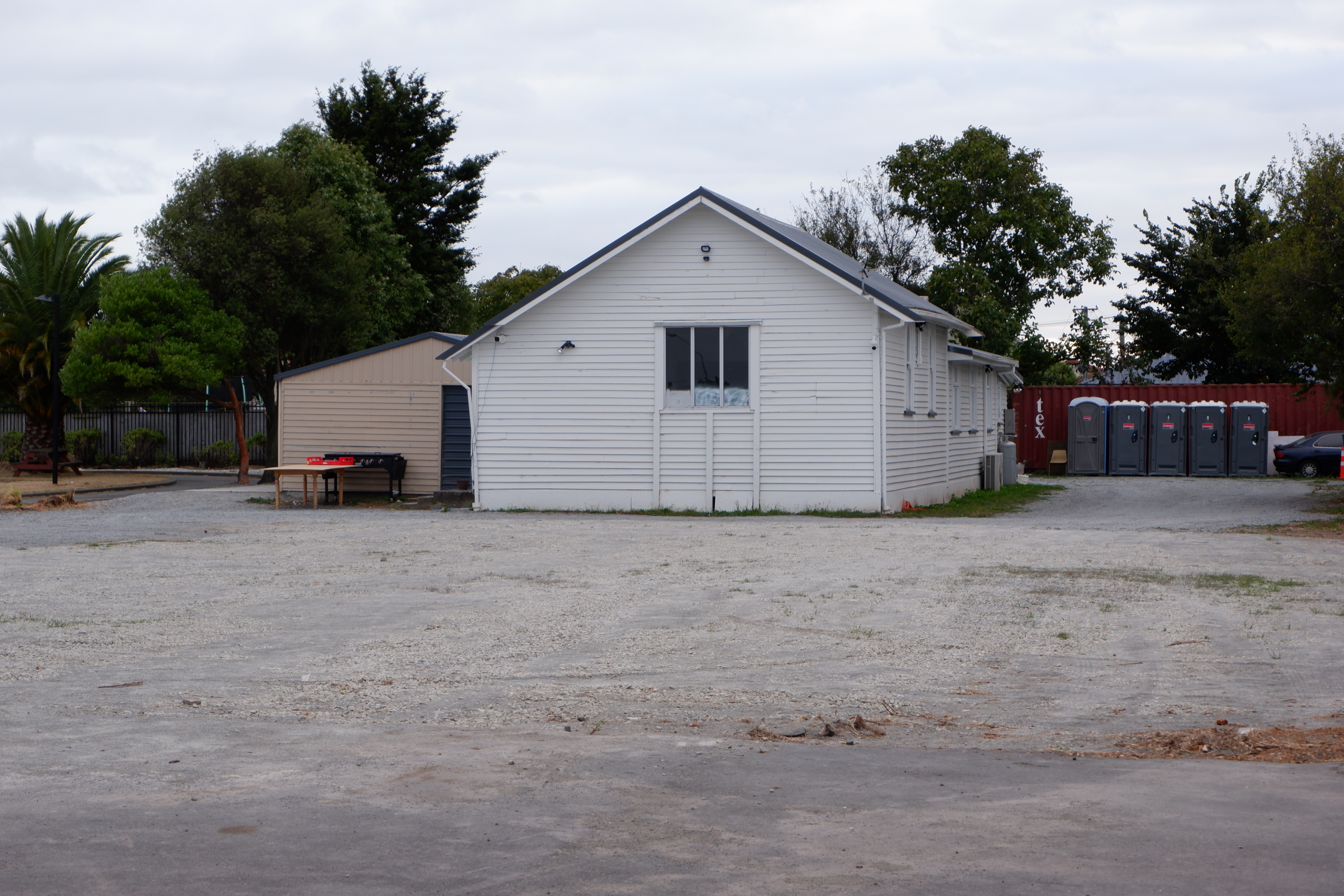
The Al Noor Mosque (left) and the Linwood Islamic Centre (right) were the targets of the Christchurch mosque shootings, which killed 51 people. The incident is the deadliest mass shooting in modern New Zealand history.

New Zealand has experienced few terrorist incidents in its history and the threat is generally regarded as very low. However, the Security Intelligence Service (SIS) has warned against complacency. This article serves as a list and compilation of past acts of terrorism, attempts of terrorism, and other such items pertaining to terrorist activities within New Zealand. Significant acts of terrorism include the bombing of the Rainbow Warrior in 1985, an act of state-sponsored terrorism by France, and the Christchurch mosque shootings in 2019, a far-right attack which resulted in 51 deaths and 40 injuries.

== Definition ==
A common definition of terrorism is the "systematic use of violence to create a general climate of fear in a population and thereby to bring about a particular political objective." There is no single definition that commands full international approval, but unlike many other jurisdictions, New Zealand has actually defined terrorism in an Act of Parliament.

The major piece of terrorist-related legislation in New Zealand is the Terrorism Suppression Act 2002. The Act was introduced by the Government to strengthen its counter-terrorism powers, in response to the terrorist attacks of September 11, 2001 in the United States. The Terrorism Suppression Act defines terrorism, in New Zealand or elsewhere, as an act that "is carried out for the purpose of advancing an ideological, political, or religious cause" and with the following intention:

1. to induce terror in a civilian population; or
2. to unduly compel or to force a government or an international organisation to do or abstain from doing any act.

And if it results in one or more of the following outcomes:

1. the death of, or other serious bodily injury to, one or more persons (other than a person carrying out the act):
2. a serious risk to the health or safety of a population:
3. destruction of, or serious damage to, property of great value or importance, or major economic loss, or major environmental damage, if likely to result in one or more outcomes specified in points 1, 2 and 4:
4. serious interference with, or serious disruption to, an infrastructure facility, if likely to endanger human life:
5. introduction or release of a disease-bearing organism, if likely to devastate the national economy of a country.

Alternatively, instead of the listed outcomes, "it occurs in a situation of armed conflict and is, at the time and in the place that it occurs, in accordance with rules of international law applicable to the conflict".

== Level of threat ==
The Security Intelligence Service (SIS) stated in its 2006 report that "the risk of a terrorist attack on New Zealand or New Zealand interests is low", but also warned against complacency. It has stated that there are individuals in New Zealand linked to international terrorism, although the Green Party and others have dismissed these claims. Once identified as a threat to New Zealand, Ahmed Zaoui became a citizen. In another case, a man named Rayed Mohammed Abdullah Ali was deported from New Zealand after being linked to the hijacker of American Airlines Flight 77 which hit the Pentagon on 11 September 2001.

In response to the Christchurch terrorist attacks of 15 March 2019, the country's threat level was temporarily raised from "low" to "high" and was later lowered to "medium" on 17 April 2019.

New Zealand threat level scale
Threat level	Description
Very Low	Terrorist attack, etc. is assessed as unlikely.
Low	Terrorist attack, etc. is assessed as a realistic possibility.
Medium	Terrorist attack, etc. is assessed as feasible and could well occur.
High	Terrorist attack, etc. is assessed as highly likely.
Extreme	Terrorist attack, etc. is expected.

== List of notable incidents ==
Most attacks, or attempted acts, of terrorism in New Zealand have been bombings as a form of protest.

=== Huntly rail bridge bombing ===
On 30 April 1951, during an industrial dispute, a rail bridge three miles from Huntly, on the Glen Afton branch line, was dynamited. Although the morning passenger train ran over the damaged bridge, it did not collapse. After regular railway line patrols were commenced, trains ran normally again the next day. Sidney Holland, the Prime Minister of the time, called it an "infamous act of terrorism". Academic Lance Beath writes that the bombing might not be considered a "terrorist" incident because there was no intent to kill or injure people and the only objective was blocking supplies. Conversely, author Len Richardson accepts the police assessment that the explosion was intended to intimidate open-cast mineworkers.

=== Vietnam War protests ===
In 1969–70 there was an alleged attempt to bomb the Waitangi flagpole, although any credible evidence of this occurrence is hard to find. Aside from the alleged flagpole bombing attempts, the intense protests against New Zealand's involvement in the Vietnam War mostly involved throwing red paint (symbolic of blood) and flour.

=== Anti-apartheid protests ===
In 1976 the Hutt Recreation Ground in Lower Hutt hosted the Men's Softball World Championship. The tournament was controversial due to the participation of a team from Apartheid South Africa. Prior to the tournament start, an opponent to South Africa's involvement planted an incendiary bomb in the middle of the ground's softball diamond, which exploded and damaged a 10 metre radius. A caller then rang the Wellington newspaper, The Dominion, and claimed responsibility.

=== Wanganui Computer Centre bombing ===
On 18 November 1982, a suicide bomb attack was made against a facility housing the main computer system of the New Zealand Police, Courts, Ministry of Transport and other law enforcement agencies, in Whanganui. The attacker, an anarchist named Neil Roberts, was the only person killed, and the computer system was undamaged.

=== Wellington Trades Hall bombing ===
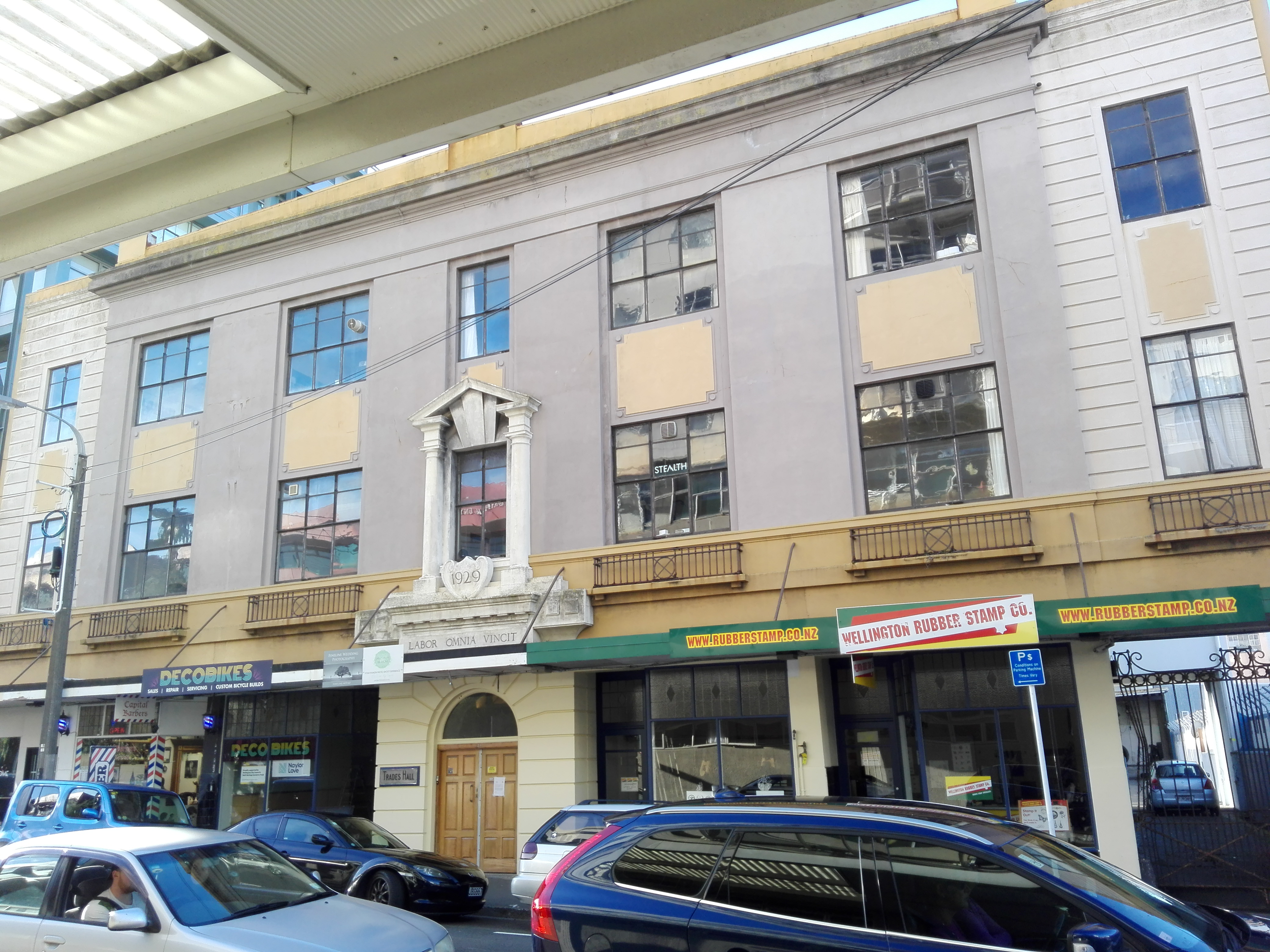
Wellington Trades Hall in 2018

On 27 March 1984, a suitcase bomb was left in the foyer of the Trades Hall in Wellington. The Trades Hall was the headquarters of a number of trade unions and it is most commonly assumed that unions were the target of the bombing. Ernie Abbott, the building's caretaker, was killed when he attempted to move the suitcase, which is believed to have contained three sticks of gelignite triggered by a mercury switch. To this day, the perpetrator has never been identified. It was revealed in a 2019 episode of Cold Case that police had a prime suspect, a retired marine engineer with explosives expertise and anti-union attitudes; however the evidence was considered circumstantial and insufficient to lay charges.

Before her death in 2016, union leader Helen Kelly (who knew Abbott) said she felt the bombing was a result of the "anti-union hysteria" created under the then government of Robert Muldoon.

=== Rainbow Warrior bombing ===
On 10 July 1985, the Greenpeace vessel Rainbow Warrior was sunk by the French foreign intelligence service, the Direction Générale de la Sécurité Extérieure (DGSE). Greenpeace had planned to use the Rainbow Warrior as part of protest efforts over French nuclear testing at Moruroa, and DGSE divers sank the vessel by detonating mines against its hull while it was berthed in Auckland. The crew left the ship, but one person, photographer Fernando Pereira, was drowned when he returned to a cabin to retrieve his cameras, just before the vessel sank.

France initially denied responsibility for the attack, but later admitted its role. Two of the French agents involved in the attack were arrested, convicted, and sentenced to 10 and 7 years on a military camp in French Polynesia. They were released in less than 2 years. Several others escaped prosecution. French defence minister Charles Hernu eventually resigned over the affair. New Zealand Prime Minister David Lange later referred to the sinking as "a sordid act of international state-backed terrorism."

=== Christchurch mosque shootings ===
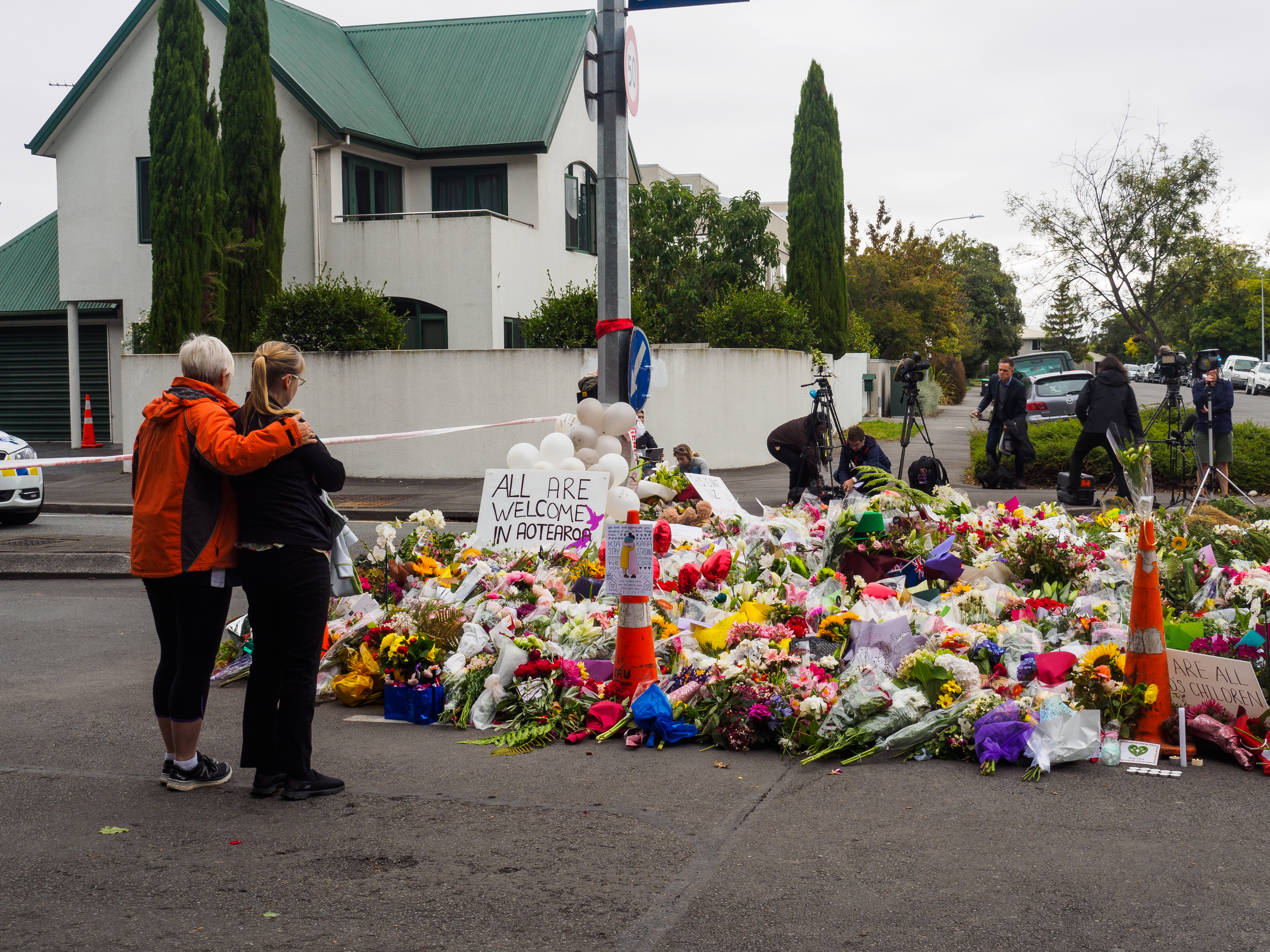
Women leaving flowers for mosque shooting victims

On 15 March 2019, Al Noor Mosque and Linwood Islamic Centre in Christchurch were attacked by a gunman in the Christchurch mosque shootings. Fifty-one people were killed and forty were injured, making this the deadliest mass shooting in New Zealand history. Two improvised explosive devices were found attached to a car and were subsequently disabled. Brenton Tarrant, an Australian man, was arrested and charged with murder and engaging in a terrorist act. Prime Minister Jacinda Ardern described the shootings as a terrorist attack. The gunman was later sentenced to life imprisonment without the possibility of parole in August 2020. Ardern implored people not to use the gunman's name, stating “speak the names of those who were lost, rather than the name of the man who took them. He may have sought notoriety, but we in New Zealand will give him nothing. Not even his name.”

=== Auckland supermarket stabbing ===
On 3 September 2021, Ahamed Aathill Mohamed Samsudeen acted as a lone wolf using a knife to attack shoppers at a Countdown (now Woolworths) supermarket inside LynnMall, West Auckland. He injured seven people and was being followed by police at the time. He was shot dead by officers at the scene about two minutes after the attack began. According to a statement by Prime Minister Jacinda Ardern, Samsudeen held a violent ideology inspired by the Islamic State.

== Counter-terrorism ==
The principal government agencies responsible for countering the threat of terrorism are the New Zealand Police (who have responsibility for direct action) and the SIS (who have responsibility for providing information on which action can be based). The counter-terrorism capabilities of the Police have been expanded in response to the 11 September attacks in the United States, and counter-terrorism also takes up a significant proportion of the SIS's budget. One observer has argued that New Zealand "already had in place a very comprehensive set of counter-measures" before that point.

=== 2007 anti-terror raids ===
Seventeen people were arrested in co-ordinated raids on 15 October 2007 by Police Armed Offenders Squads and Special Tactics Group. Those arrested included environmental activists and Māori separatists, including noted activist Tame Iti, but the raids also included roadblocks in the Urewera area by armed police who searched and questioned everyone who passed through.

After lengthy legal proceedings, none of those arrested were convicted of anything more serious than violation of gun license rules under the Arms Act. Although the search warrants used indicated that terrorism related offences were involved, no charges were laid under the 2002 Terrorism Suppression Act—with the Solicitor-General describing the legislation as "complex and incoherent". Major amendments to the Act were being pushed through Parliament at the time of the raids, as well as legislation creating the charge of "participation in an organised criminal group", justified as necessary to address gang violence, a charge which was unsuccessfully applied to four of those arrested.

=== Robert Gilchrist ===
In December 2008, Christchurch man Robert Gilchrist was exposed by his activist partner as a police informant, having been paid $600 a week to infiltrate a number of activist and political groups since 1998. Gilchrist was given the codename “Muldoon” by police, and had infiltrated animal rights groups, Greenpeace, Labour, Greens, anti-war groups, the Engineering, Printing and Manufacturing Union, the Maritime Union, the Council of Trade Unions, and other associations. Gilchrist had been working under the National Security Investigations Team since it was set up in 2004 as part of counter-terror legislation, a joint operation between police, the NZDF, NZSIS and GCSB.

In 2013, Gilchrist sued the police for $550,000 in damages over his time as an informant, including lost wages and damages for distress and humiliation. Gilchrist and police settled in 2015 for an undisclosed amount.

== See also ==
- List of massacres in New Zealand
- Crime in New Zealand
- Politics of New Zealand
- List of terrorist incidents
