= Coroner's inquiry into the Christchurch mosque shootings =

2022 coronial inquiry in New Zealand

Christchurch Masjidain Attack Inquiry
- Court: Coroners Court
- Full case name: The Christchurch Masjidain Attack Coronial Inquiry
- Started: Coroner notified of deaths on 15 March 2019; first phase of inquiry began 24 October 2023

Court membership
- Judge sitting: Brigitte Windley

The Christchurch Masjidain Attack Inquiry (Note: Legally referred to as "Inquiry into the deaths of 51 people in relation to the 15 March 2019 Christchurch Masjidain Attack".) is a coronial inquiry by the Coronial Services of New Zealand into the Christchurch mosque shootings which occurred on 15 March 2019. The coronial inquiry was preceded by criminal proceedings and a Royal Commission of Inquiry. The scope stage of the Inquiry was held between 22 and 24 February 2022, which led Coroner Brigitte Windley to identify 12 issues to be examined. The first phase was held between 24 October and 14 December 2023. The first phase examined nine issues including the events of the 15 March, the Police, emergency services, and Christchurch Hospital's response to the attack, whether shooter Brenton Tarrant received help during the attack, and the final movements and circumstances of each of the 51 deceased's deaths.

The second phase examined the Police firearms licensing process, Tarrant's online radicalisation and future responses to violent extremism. It was held in May and October 2024.

== Background ==
On 15 March 2019, White supremacist Brenton Tarrant staged two consecutive mass shootings at the Al Noor Mosque and Linwood Islamic Centre in Christchurch, killing 51 people. He live-streamed the first shooting on Facebook, marking the first successfully live-streamed far-right terror attack, and had published an online manifesto before the attack. On 26 March 2020, he pleaded guilty to 51 murders, 40 attempted murders, and engaging in a terrorist act, and in August was sentenced to life imprisonment without the possibility of parole – the first such sentence in New Zealand.

The attack was linked to an increase in white supremacy and alt-right extremism globally observed since about 2015. Politicians and world leaders condemned it, and then-Prime Minister of New Zealand Jacinda Ardern described it as "one of New Zealand's darkest days". The government established a royal commission into its security agencies in the wake of the shootings, which were the deadliest in modern New Zealand history and the worst ever committed by an Australian national. The commission submitted its report to the government on 26 November 2020, the details of which were made public on 7 December.

On 21 October 2021, Chief Coroner Judge Deborah Marshall confirmed that she had opened an inquiry into the Christchurch mosque shootings. In late October, Marshall confirmed that she plans to examine the initial response to the attacks by emergency services and whether any victims could have been saved if things had been done differently. The Judge confirmed that she was also seeking submissions from interested parties before the scope of the inquiry is finalised.

== Scope stage ==
On 22 February 2022, the scope stage of the coronial inquiry into the mosque shootings commenced. The inquiry was chaired by Coroner Brigitte Windley. The inquiry is expected to hear from lawyers representing the families of the victims, the Federation of Islamic Associations of New Zealand, the Islamic Women's Council, St John New Zealand, the Canterbury District Health Board, Police, and the Human Rights Commission. The entire coronial hearing was held via video conferencing due to the ongoing COVID-19 pandemic in New Zealand. Tarrant is scheduled to attend the hearing remotely from Auckland Prison and to make a submission through his lawyers.

On 22 February, survivors and relatives of the mosque shootings asked the Coroner to investigate allegations that police responding to the attacks had acted aggressively or confrontationally towards victims of the Al Noor mosque attack. They also asked the Coroner to investigate whether Tarrant was a lone wolf or had received help, and how he had obtained his firearms license. In addition, Anne Toohey, the counsel representing Zuhair Kamel, whose brother Kamel Darwish perished at the Al-Noor mosque, presented evidence challenging the Police's account that Darwish had immediately perished following Tarrant's attack on the mosque.

On 24 February, Tarrant's lawyer Ron Mansfield KC told the Coroner that his client was seeking an appeal of the earlier Royal Commission of Inquiry's hearings on the basis of factual errors in their report. Mansfield stated that Tarrant was questioned as part of the Inquiry but was denied a transcript of his interview or a draft of the report's findings. Tarrant had only received a copy of the final report the previous week due to restrictions put in place by the Department of Corrections. Mansfield claimed that Tarrant had been denied "natural justice" and called upon the Coroner to reject the Royal Commission's report.

That same day, the Islamic Women's Council's national co-ordinator Aliya Danzeisen told the Coroner about the dangers of online "radical movements" operating on 4Chan and Telegram promoting hatred and violence against the Muslim community and undermining democracy and the rule of law in light of the 2022 Wellington protests.

On 28 April 2022, Windley issued her scope decision and identified 12 issues to be examined in further detail:

1. The events of 15 March 2019 from the commencement of the attack until the terrorist's formal interview by police.
2. The response times and entry processes of police and ambulance officers at each mosque.
3. The triage and medical response at each mosque.
4. Steps that were taken to apprehend the offender.
5. Christchurch Hospital's role and processes in response to the attack.
6. Co-ordination between emergency services.
7. Did Brenton Tarrant have direct assistance from any other person on 15 March 2019?
8. The final movements and time of death for each of the deceased.
9. The cause(s) of death of each victim and whether they died of any preventable injuries.
10. Whether the Police's firearms licensing process contributed to the attack and resulting deaths. Whether these deficiencies have since been addressed by legislative amendments.
11. Whether Tarrant's online activity between 2014 and 2017 contributed to his radicalisation.
12. The community's ability to detect and respond to the risk of violent extremism in others.

== First phase inquest hearing ==
=== First week ===
On 24 October 2023, the First Phase Inquest hearing commenced in Christchurch, which would focus on the first nine issues identified in the scope decision as well as whether Al Noor Mosque's emergency exit had malfunctioned during the attack. This inquest is expected to last for six weeks and will involve 140 interested parties. Coroner Windley is expected to examine a large amount of evidence including nearly 3,000 documents, 4,750 images, 2,720 audio files, and over 80 hours of video. While Tarrant had initially successfully applied to participate in the Inquest as an interested party, he subsequently withdrew his application.

On 25 October, the Inquiry heard evidence that a parliamentary staffer had called the Police after receiving an emailed copy of Tarrant's manifesto. The Police call-taker had categorised the emergency call as a "priority 2," meaning that it received lesser attention than calls related to the Al Noor mosque and Linwood Islamic Centre shootings, which received "priority 1" classifications. That same day, the then deputy prime minister and New Zealand First leader Winston Peters alleged on social media platform X that Prime Minister Ardern had kept secret that her office received information about the 15 March terrorist attacks before they took place. The Prime Minister's Office described Peters's tweet as "completely inaccurate" and urged him to remove the post and apologise.

On 26 October, the Inquiry heard testimony from a 111 call-taker who had received the parliamentary staffer's call regarding the gunman's manifesto. The 111 call-taker was a new recruit who was on their third or fourth shift on 15 March 2019. That same day, the Inquest heard that the Police had not immediately dispatched personnel to the Linwood Islamic Centre despite being told that the mosque was a potential target during an emergency call. On 27 October, the Inquest heard testimony from the 111 call-taker's supervisor who defended the Police's decision not to raise the priority level of the emergency call regarding the mosque attack. That same day, 111 call-taker Constable Dara Taylor testified that Police would have dispatched forces to evacuate Linwood Mosque had the mosque shooting emergency call been given a "priority 1" classification. Taylor had been unaware of the parliamentary staffer's 111 call until four days after the shootings.

=== Second week ===
On 30 October, the Inquest heard testimony from an Armed Offenders Squad (AOS) officer who had responded to the shooting at Al Noor Mosque, operations commander Detective Superintendent Darryl Sweeney, and senior police communicator Bret Watkins. Sweeney admitted mistaking a delayed livestream feed for an actual attack while Watkins admitted that the priority level of the 111 call relating to the Christchurch attack should have been upgraded. On 31 October, the Inquest heard testimony from Sergeant Aaron Reid, who admitted that Police lacked experienced dealing with such mass shooting events and that a panicked radio transmission had caused confusion in the Police response to the shootings.

On 1 November, the Inquest heard testimony that members of the Armed Offender Squad and paramedics had delayed providing first aid to victims at Al Noor Mosque due to fears that the gunman was still at large. On 2 November, the Inquest heard further testimony about the first aid response provided by Police and St John Ambulance. One senior paramedic had also entered Al Noor Mosque to render assistance to victims despite St John's policy against entering unsafe scenes. In addition, local resident Len Peneha, who lived near Al Noor Mosque, testified about his encounter with the gunman. On 3 November, two Al Noor survivors Mohammad Siddiqui and Ahmad Alayedy testified about the malfunctioning emergency door. A third survivor Mohamed Adwy testified that Police had prevented several survivors from re-entering the mosque to aid wounded fellow congregants due to safety concerns.

=== Third week ===
On 6 November, an AOS member testified that he had requested more ambulances due to the large number of casualties at Al Noor Mosque. In addition, he testified that Tarrant has sped past his vehicle at a traffic light stop. On 7 November, Ambulance officer Craig Stockdale disputed Police claims that St John Ambulance had been slow to respond to the shootings at Al Noor Mosque. That same day, a senior Police officer testified that Police were unaware that badly injured victims had been left in Al Noor Mosque and only found out several days or weeks later. On 8 November, Stockdale testified that paramedics were overwhelmed by the sheer number of casualties at Al Noor Mosque, many of which needed hospital attention. On 9 November, Police Constable Coral-Ann Bowler testified about the emotional impact on Police responding to the shootings at Linwood Islamic Centre. On 10 November, the Inquest heard that AOS personnel used their own vehicles to evacuate the wounded at Linwood centre since ambulances were held up at Al Noor Mosque. An AOS member testified that AOS personnel were unaware of a "load and goal strategy."

=== Fourth week ===
On 13 November, the Inquest heard testimony from an Australian police officer that paramedics spent six minutes on the road while he and AOS members persuaded them to proceed to Linwood Islamic Centre. Critical care paramedic Dale Muller disputed the police officer's account and defended the response of St John's Ambulance and other emergency staff. On 14 November, Superintendent John Price, who served as Police district commander at the time of the mosque shootings, testified that no amount of training could have prepared Police personnel for the scale of the mosque attacks and stated that minority communities had a higher risk of being attacked. In addition, Muller denied that he and his colleagues needed to be convinced to head to Linwood but acknowledged that he should have done more to obtain information about the situation they were facing.

On 15 November, the Inquest heard a transcript of the two police officers who arrested Tarrant. Tarrant had also claimed that he had bombs in his car and that he was part of a group of ten shooters. In addition, a second specialist paramedic Karen Jackson denied that paramedics had been reluctant to enter the Linwood Islamic Centre following the shooting. On 16 November, the Inquest heard recordings of Police communications at the time of the mosque shootings. The District Command Centre had ordered all Police staff in Christchurch to keep the city safe and to prepare for a possible attack in Ashburton.

=== Fifth week ===
Following a one-week recess, the Inquest resumed on 27 November. Dr Graham Whitaker, a general practitioner from the nearby Linwood community health clinic, defended the work of emergency first aid responders, stating that they were responding to "an unprecedented situation." That same day, Senior Sergeant Roy Appley was questioned by counsel assisting coroner David Boldt about the coordination between Police and St John Ambulance staff responding to the Linwood mosque attack. Appley denied there had been a breakdown in communications between Police and ambulance staff during the events of 15 March. On 28 November, a senior police tactical operator testified that AOS members had expressed frustration at the perceived delayed response of ambulance staff in responding to their calls for help at Al Noor Mosque. That same day, Appleby acknowledged that Police were unaware of St John's safety concerns about the Linwood site and said that he would have reassured the St John's that it would have been safe to deploy parademics.

On 29 November, former St John dispatcher Dawn Lucas gave evidence relating to her accidentally alerting Police to an active shooter event at the Christchurch Hospital's emergency department. Lucas had misheard a transmission that people with gunshot injuries had arrived at the hospital's emergency department, thinking that it meant a shooting was occurring in the hospital. Lucas subsequently alerted her supervisor about the mistake. Lucas also admitted under cross-examination that she had delayed the dispatch of ambulances to the shooting sites. That same day, a senior police tactical commander likened the Police response to assembling a "1000-piece jigsaw puzzle." The emergency response was complicated by inaccurate reports of six armed offenders at Linwood and Tarrant's false claims that there were nine other shooters in Canterbury.

On 30 November, the Inquest heard testimony from American counter-terrorism expert Dr. Frank Straub and Scottish counter-terrorism expert Scott Wilson, who had co-authored a report on the Christchurch mosque shootings. Straub and Wilson advocated training New Zealand paramedics and police to respond to mass shooting events and other emergencies. They also criticised Police responders for leaving victims at Al Noor Mosque alone for over ten minutes. On 1 December, Wilson advised St John's to develop a strategy for dealing with future terror attacks. Wilson and Straub also criticised the Police for not sharing all their information with St John's and advocated greater communication between the two services. That same day, the Police reiterated that no evidence had emerged of Tarrant working with anyone in the preparation and planning of the Christchurch mosque shootings. Detective Senior Sergeant Craig Farrant also acknowledged that they had investigated two "persons of interests" who had alluded to attacks on Al Noor Mosque prior to 15 March 2019. Family lawyer Nikki Pender described these two prior incidents as a "remarkable coincidence".

=== Sixth week ===
On 4 December, the Inquest heard testimony from St John's duty centre manager Bruce Chubb. The Inquest was also played audio recording of a call with 20 other St John's leaders discussing the response to the attack. Chubb conceded that St John's was not in constant communication with the Police but denied there had been a communication breakdown between the two organisations. On 5 December, the Inquest heard testimony from Linwood survivor Saira Patel, whose husband Musa Patel perished due to injuries sustained during Tarrant's attack. During questioning, Chubb also acknowledged that St John's had not been aware about the whereabouts of its Special Emergency Response Team (SERT) personnel during the attacks. While no SERT personnel were present at Al Noor Mosque, two SERT paramedics responded to the Linwood shooting.

On 6 December, an AOS commander testified that emergency services would be trialling a new Public Safety Network in 2024 to improve communications between Police and ambulance services in response to the communications breakdown between Police and St John's during the Christchurch mosque shootings. On 8 December, a senior Police sergeant testified that the lack of a Police Eagle helicopter presence in Christchurch had hampered the Police response to the mass shootings. The officer testified that a helicopter would have enabled Police to track down the terrorist faster. In addition, an AOS commander testified that Police would not have been able to respond to Linwood Islamic Centre within the seven minute timeframe of the manifesto's release. The manifesto had identified Linwood as one of Tarrant's targets.

=== Seventh week ===
On 11 December, British counter-terrorism expert Julian Platt testified that Police could have stopped the attack against Linwood Islamic Centre had they been aware of the threat against it. While Platt praised the swift Police response to the shooting at Al Noor Mosque, he criticised the decision by a Police call-taker to categorise a call from a Parliamentary staffer identifying Linwood mosque as a potential target as a "Priority Two" event. Platt was also critical of the decision to deploy Armed Offender Squad personnel from Al Noor mosque to Linwood Islamic Centre, stating that they should have been replaced by reinforcements so that the wounded were not left unattended at Al Noor Mosque. On 13 December, the Inquest heard testimony from six medical professionals including US-based emergency medical expert Dr John Hick, US trauma surgeon Dr Andre Campbell, New Zealand forensic pathologist Dr Martin Sage, British-based Professor Charles Deakin, British-based Professor of forensic pathology Guy Rutty. The medical professionals were questioned whether medical intervention could have saved the lives of five victims: Ramiz Vora, Farhaj Ahsan, Tariq Omar, Zekeriya Tuyan and Musa Patel. That same day, Fire and Emergency New Zealand (FENZ) commander Brendan Nally defended the organisation's decision not to deploy firefighters in response to the mass shootings, stating that they were not trained to deal with armed shooter incidents and did not have access to ballistic protection. Nally also told the Inquest that a FENZ representative was present at the Police District Command Centre and provided regular updates to a manager.

On 14 December, Dr John Hick testified that delays and confusion in mass shooting events like the Christchurch terror attack were not uncommon. He also said that the fatalities and injured would have place a strain on the local hospital system and ambulance respondents. On 15 December, US-based police expert Alan Brosnan testified that paramedics needed intense and realistic training to prepare themselves to work with Police in future major incidents similar to the Christchurch shootings. That same day, the inquest concluded after seven weeks of hearings. Deputy chief coroner Windley along with counsel for the Police, St John's, Fire and Emergency, as well as families of the victims and survivors made closing statements.

Following the first phase inquest hearing, Windley will formulate her findings, which are expected to be released in 2024.

== Second phase inquest hearing ==
Following the First Phase Inquest, the Inquiry is expected to look at the Police's firearms licensing process, Tarrant's online activities, and the community's ability to detect and response to violent extremism.

=== May 2024 ===
On 20 May, the Coroner's inquiry resumed and is expected to last for the next two weeks. 16 witnesses are expected to give evidence on the emergency door's locking mechanism on 15 March 2019. The witnesses will include survivors, other members of the Muslim community and others who were involved with the door including repair work. That day, a builder who helped repair Al Noor's emergency door testified that the lock on the main emergency door may have created confusion and delay during the shooting. On 21 May, survivor Khaled Al-Nobani testified that the faulty emergency door had created chaos and panic during the shooting at Al Noor Mosque. On 21 May, Al Noor Mosque imam Gamal Fouda testified that two people came to the mosque on the day of the shooting and verbally abused a worshipper. Though he had reported the matter to the Police, the Police said they were unable to act. On 28 May, Al Noor Mosque survivor Khaled Al-Nobani gave testimony arguing that the failure of the main emergency door did not contribute to the number of lives lost during the massacre.

=== October 2024 ===
The second-phase inquest resumed on 8 October 2024. Deputy Chief Coroner Brigitte Windley would examine how Tarrant came to obtain his firearms licence; whether police should have obtained information which would have led them to reject his application; and faults in the Police firearms assessment process. The inquest is expected to last three weeks with 15 witnesses being called. On the first day Michael McIlraith, the-then Police national lead for firearms, testified that the firearms service was under-resourced and that staff faced significant workload pressures. On 9 October, a firearms licensing clerk told the inquest that Tarrant had originally put his Australian-based sister as a referee to support his firearms application. Tarrant instead nominated a gaming friend and the gaming friend's parent, who were licensed firearms owners who were endorsed to own pistols and semi-automatic firearms. These referees were accepted by the Police. The clerk also told the inquest that Tarrant had been categorised as "fit and proper" under the firearms licensing process, which at the time relied on a "high trust" model dependent on the applicant and referees to tell the truth.

On 10 October a former police vetting officer, who had interviewed Tarrant's two referees, told the inquest that the two referees had given positive character references for the terrorist. That same day Windley, victims' lawyer Kathryn Dalziel and coroner's counsel Ian Murray questioned the two referees about their interactions with Tarrant. The gaming friend told the inquest that he was aware of the terrorist's racist and far right views but was unaware of Tarrant's homicidal intentions. He acknowledged that he would have been a lot more vigilant in hindsight. The gaming friend's parent had a tense exchange with Murray, who questioned him about his knowledge of Tarrant's character and background. On 11 October the former police vetting officer, who had interviewed Tarrant for his firearms license application, described the terrorist as a "good actor that was clearly hiding something more sinister."

On 15 October the inquest heard testimony from NZSAS firearms expert Shane Hepi and Tarrant's sister Lauren Tarrant. Hepi, who had reviewed footage of the mosque shootings, said that the terrorist "performed in a chaotic, unskilled, cumbersome and non-proficient manner." He concluded that Tarrant lacked any formal intermediate or advanced weapons handling and control training and assessed his abilities as "very low level and lacked any form of proficiency." Lauren told the inquest that Tarrant had developed an admiration for Adolf Hitler, Oswald Mosley and Nigel Farage after returning from his overseas travels in 2016. She said that he had shaved his head and developed an interest in firearms after moving to New Zealand in 2017. On 16 October, Lauren told the inquest that she would have told New Zealand Police that her brother was suitable to have access to firearms due to his prior lack of criminal convictions. On 17 October University of Canterbury sociologist Dr Jarrod Gilbert told the inquest that Tarrant would have had difficulty obtaining firearms from New Zealand gangs due to his lack of criminal history and connections, and his White supremacist ideology.

On 21 October, the inquest heard expert testimony from University of Waikato terrorism and firearms expert Professor Al Gillespie. Gillespie told the inquest that a critically flawed firearms licensing and regulation regime as well as lax controls around the use of legal and illegal firearms had contributed to the Christchurch mosque shootings. His testimony was part of the inquest's examination of gun laws in New Zealand leading up to the events of 15 March 2019. On 24 October, the second-phase inquest adjourned with closing statements being made by Windley, victims' lawyers Kathryn Dalziel, Fatima Ali, Amir Bastani, and Kerryn Beaton KC. Windley said that the inquest sought to explore the connection between the firearms licensing process and the mosque shootings while the victims' lawyers spoke of the impact of the two mosque shootings on victims and their families.

In late October 2024, Council of Licensed Firearm Owners (COLFO) vice-chair Michael Dowling claimed that a Police failure to address loopholes on obtaining military-style semi-automatic firearms had led to the Christchurch mosque shootings. His statements were disputed by Firearms Safety Authority Mike McIlraith, who said that Dowling had not raised the matter during a Firearms Community Advisory Forum in 2017.

== Brenton Tarrant's possible participation ==
In 14 October 2024, lawyers representing survivors of the mosque shootings and their families sought a High Court judicial review of deputy coroner Brigitte Windley's decision to call convicted terrorist Brenton Tarrant to give testimony as a witness at the second phase of the coronial inquiry. They argued that giving Tarrant the stand would retraumatize survivors and their families and give him a platform for promoting his extremist views. On 24 October 2025, High Court Justice Jonathon Eaton dismissed the plaintiff's application for a judicial review and upheld the deputy coroner's decision to call Tarrant as a witness. Tarrant's possible participation in the coronial inquest coincided with his legal challenge against his murder convictions and life sentence at the Court of Appeal of New Zealand.

In early March 2026, families of the mosque shooting victims appealed against Justice Eaton's ruling to the Court of Appeal, arguing against Windley's decision to call Tarrant as a witness in the coronial inquiry. Disagreements about Tarrant's participation had led to a pause in the second phase of the coronial inquiry's proceedings. While lawyers representing the families argued that Tarrant would use the coronial proceedings to platform his extremist views and retraumatise his victims, the court-appointed "contradictor" Kerry Cook argued that Windley's decision to allow written and oral submissions from Tarrant was "lawful, reasonable and proportionate."
