= Christchurch mosque shootings =

2019 terrorist attacks in New Zealand

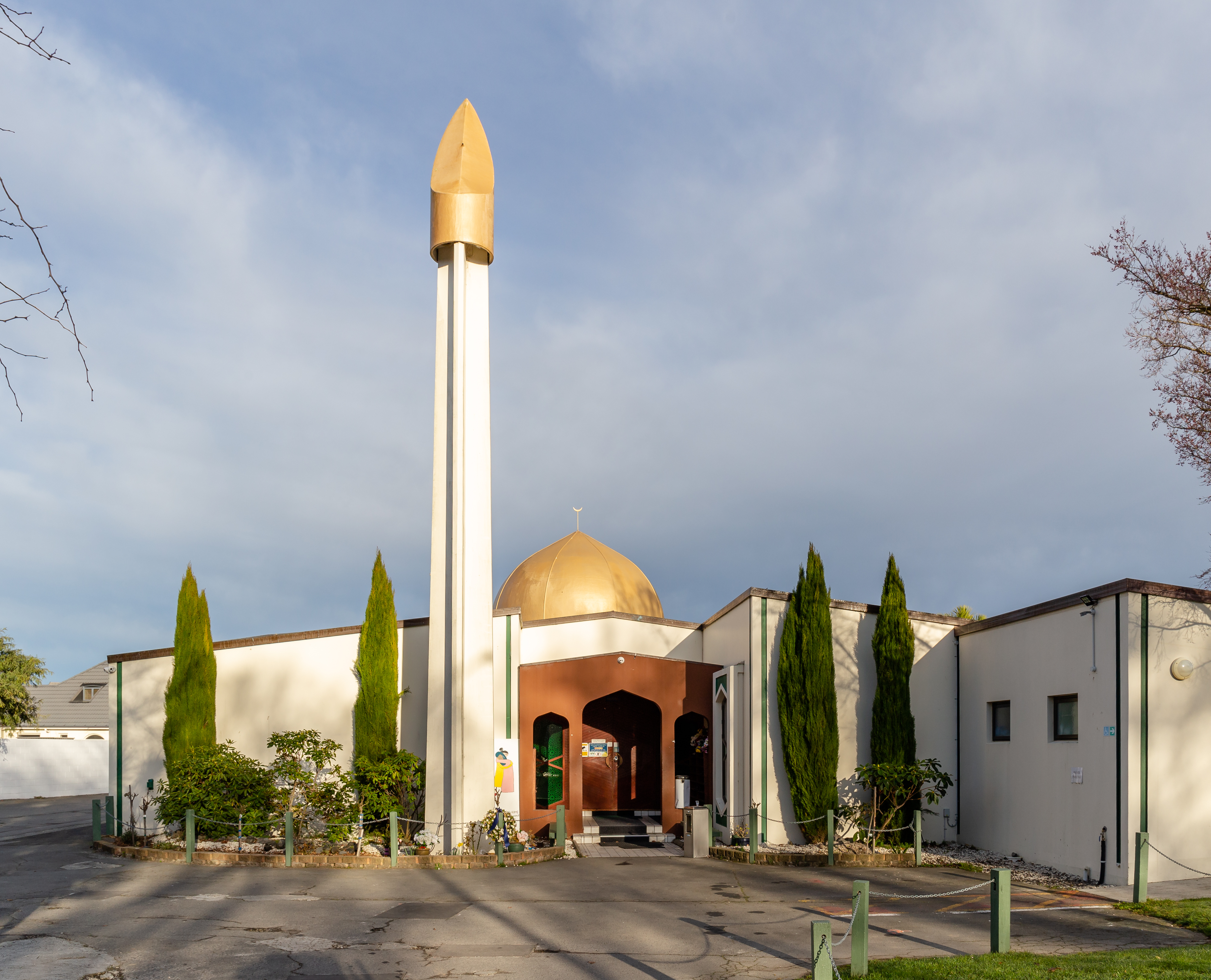
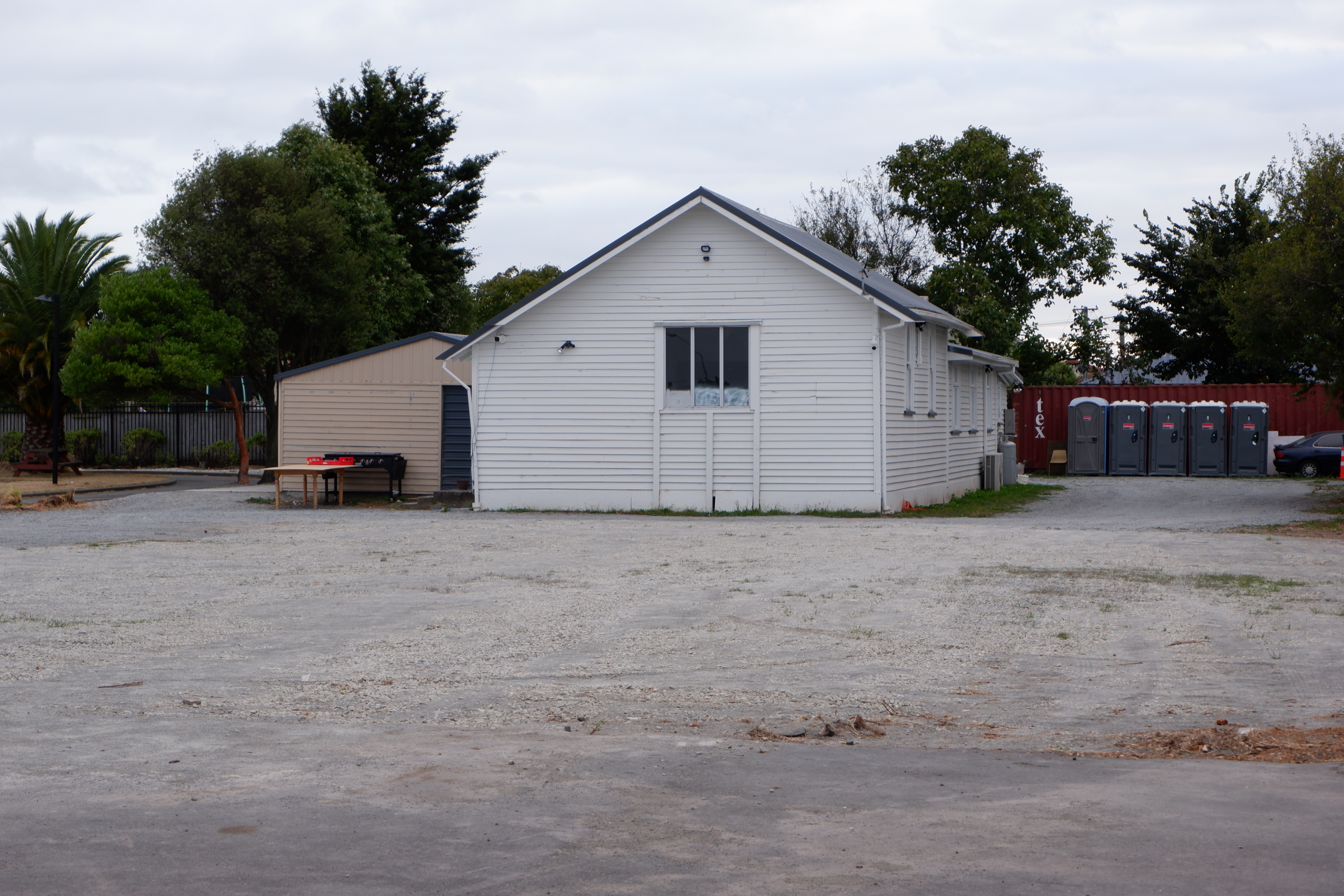

- Christchurch mosque shootings (Christchurch, New Zealand) Christchurch (New Zealand)
- Location: 43.5329°S 172.6118°E (Al Noor Mosque); 43.5324°S 172.6726°E (Linwood Islamic Centre)
- Date: 15 March 2019; 7 years ago 1:40 – 1:59 p.m. (NZDT; UTC+13)
- Target: Muslims and immigrants
- Attack type: Mass shooting, hate crime
- Weapons: 4 rifles, 2 shotguns; 1 bayonet
- Deaths: 51
- Injuries: 89
- Perpetrator: Brenton Harrison Tarrant
- Defenders: Naeem Rashid; Abdul Aziz Wahabzada
- Motive: Islamophobia; White supremacy; Belief in the white genocide and Great Replacement conspiracy theory
- Verdict: Pleaded guilty on all counts
- Convictions: Murder (51 counts); Attempted murder (40 counts); Committing a terrorist act
- Sentence: Life imprisonment without parole on each of 51 counts of murder; 12 years concurrently on 40 counts of attempted murder; life for committing a terrorist act.

On 15 March 2019, two consecutive terrorist mass shootings took place in Christchurch, New Zealand. They were committed during Friday prayer, first at the Al Noor Mosque in Riccarton at 1:40 p.m., and shortly afterwards at 1:52 p.m. at the Linwood Islamic Centre. In total, 51 people were killed and 89 others were injured, including 40 by gunfire. The perpetrator was identified as Brenton Tarrant, a 28-year-old Australian man.

Tarrant was arrested after his vehicle was rammed by a police car as he was driving to a third mosque in Ashburton. He live-streamed the first shooting on Facebook, marking the first successfully live-streamed far-right terror attack, and had published a manifesto online before the attack. On 26 March 2020, he pleaded guilty to 51 murders, 40 attempted murders, and engaging in a terrorist act, and in August was sentenced to life imprisonment without the possibility of parole – the first such sentence in New Zealand.

The attacks were mainly motivated by white nationalism, anti-immigrant sentiment, and white supremacist beliefs. Tarrant described himself as an ecofascist and professed belief in the far-right "Great Replacement" conspiracy theory in the context of a "white genocide". The attack was linked to an increase in white supremacy and alt-right extremism observed globally since about 2015.

The prime minister, Jacinda Ardern, described the event as a "well-planned" terrorist attack. Other politicians and world leaders condemned it. The government established a royal commission into its security agencies in the wake of the shootings, which were the deadliest in modern New Zealand history and the worst ever committed by an Australian national. The commission submitted its report to the government on 26 November 2020, the details of which were made public on 7 December. The shooting has inspired multiple copycat attacks, especially due to its live-streamed nature. In response to this incident, the United Nations designated 15 March as the International Day to Combat Islamophobia.

== Background ==
=== Locations ===
The gunman first attacked at the Al Noor Mosque in the suburb of Riccarton, on Deans Avenue opposite Hagley Park. He then drove at speed 6 km to the Linwood Islamic Centre on Linwood Avenue in Linwood where he continued his attack a few minutes later.

=== Perpetrator ===
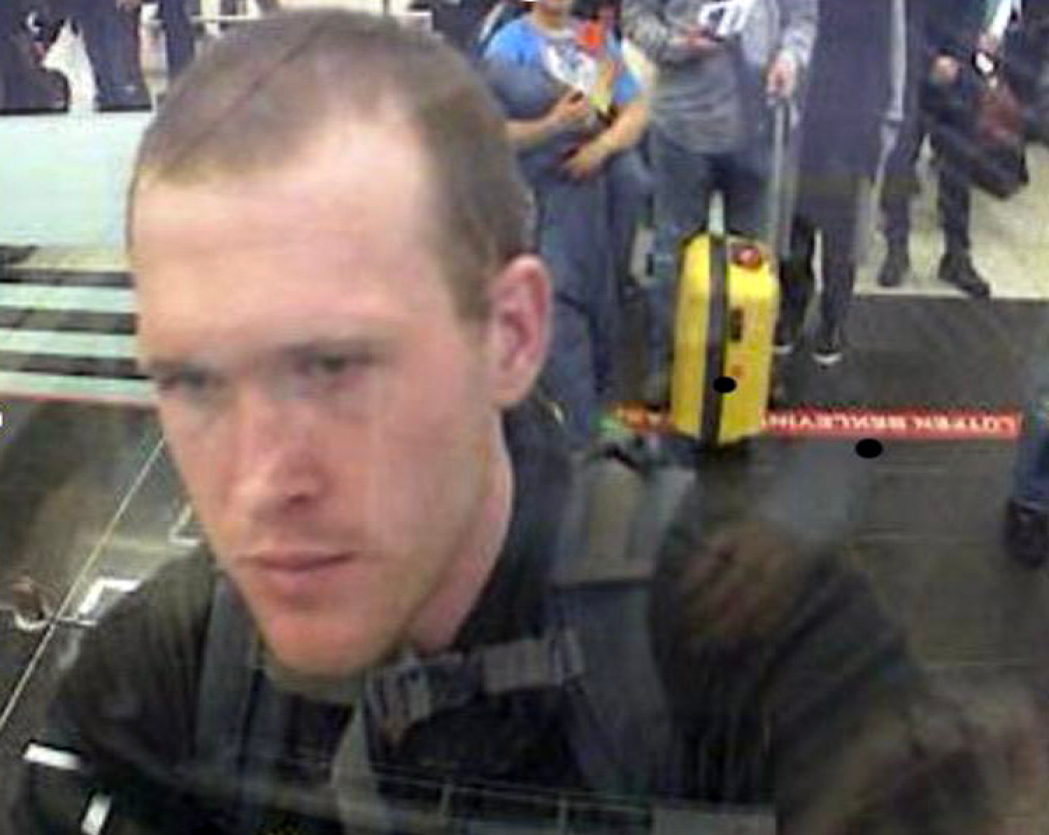
The perpetrator, Brenton Tarrant, in a 2016 airport camera photo when he entered Turkey

Brenton Harrison Tarrant (born 27 October 1990), a white Australian man from Grafton, New South Wales, who perpetrated the shootings, was 28 years old at the time of the shootings. After his arrest, Tarrant told investigators that he frequented right-wing discussion boards on 4chan and 8chan and also found YouTube to be "a significant source of information and inspiration". Tarrant arrived in New Zealand in August 2017 and lived in Andersons Bay in Dunedin until the shootings. He was a member of a South Otago gun club, where he practised shooting at its range.

=== Manifesto ===
Tarrant wrote a 74-page manifesto entitled The Great Replacement, a reference to the "Great Replacement" and "white genocide" conspiracy theories. Minutes before the attacks began, the manifesto was emailed to more than 30 recipients, including the prime minister's office and several media outlets, and links were shared on Twitter and 8chan. Seven minutes after Tarrant sent the email containing the manifesto to parliament, it was forwarded to the parliament security team, who instantly called the police communication centre at 1:40 p.m., around the same time the first 111 calls were made from the Al Noor Mosque.

In the manifesto, several anti-immigrant sentiments are expressed, including hate speech against migrants, white supremacist rhetoric, and calls for all non-European immigrants in Europe whom he claimed to be "invading his land" to be removed. The manifesto displays neo-Nazi symbols though he denies being a Nazi, describing himself instead as an "ethno-nationalist", and an "eco-fascist".

The manifesto was described by some media outlets as "shitposting"—a form of trolling designed to derail conversations and provoke strong reactions. On 23 March 2019, the manifesto was classified as "objectionable" by the Chief Censor, making its use in New Zealand a criminal offence.

Exemptions to the ban were available for journalists, researchers, and academics. In August 2019, The New Zealand Herald reported that printed copies of the manifesto were being sold online outside New Zealand, something New Zealand law could not prevent.

In the manifesto, Tarrant also claimed that China is the nation that most aligns with his political and social values. He had a stated aim of polarising and destabilising the West and to spark a civil war in the United States so as to force a "separation of races".

=== People and countries mentioned by Tarrant ===
Just before carrying out the attacks, Tarrant asked his audience to subscribe to YouTuber PewDiePie's channel in light of his then-ongoing rivalry with Indian channel T-Series. PewDiePie, real name Felix Kjellberg, has been accused of using far-right content in his videos. Kjellberg tweeted his condolences in reaction, saying he "felt absolutely sickened" to be mentioned by Tarrant. Kjellberg later called for the "subscribe to PewDiePie" movement to be discontinued, citing the attacks; "to have my name associated with something so unspeakably vile has affected me in more ways than I've let show."

During the attacks, Tarrant played the song "Fire" by The Crazy World of Arthur Brown. In a Facebook post, singer Arthur Brown expressed "horror and sadness" at the use of his song during the attacks, and cancelled a planned instore appearance at Waterloo Records shortly after the shootings out of respect for the victims.

Internet users in China expressed anger because Tarrant had praised their country's values.

=== Planning ===
Tarrant started planning an attack about two years prior to the shootings, and chose his targets three months in advance. Some survivors at the Al Noor Mosque believed they had seen Tarrant there on several Fridays before the attack, pretending to pray and asking about the mosque's schedules. The Royal Commission report found no evidence of this, and police instead believe that Tarrant had viewed an online tour of Al Noor as part of his planning.

On 8 January 2019, Tarrant used a drone operated from a nearby park to investigate the mosque's grounds. Additionally, he used the Internet to find detailed mosque plans, interior pictures, and prayer schedules to figure out when mosques would be at their busiest levels. On the same day, he had driven past the Linwood Islamic Centre.

=== Weapons ===
Police recovered six guns: two AR-15 style rifles (one manufactured by Windham Weaponry and the other by Ruger), two 12-gauge shotguns (a semi automatic Mossberg 930 and a pump-action Remington Model 870), and two other rifles (a .357 Magnum Uberti lever-action rifle, and a .223-calibre Mossberg Predator bolt-action rifle). Tarrant was granted a firearms licence with an "A" endorsement in November 2017, and purchased weapons between December 2017 and March 2019, along with more than 7,000 rounds of ammunition. He used four 30-round magazines, five 40-round magazines, and one 60-round magazine in the shootings. Additionally, he illegally replaced the semi-automatic rifles' small magazines with the higher capacity magazines purchased online, against the conditions of Tarrant's gun licence.

The guns and magazines used were covered in white writing naming historical events, people, and motifs related to recent Serbian nationalism and past conflicts between muslims and Christians; as well as the names of recent Islamic terrorist victims and the far-right attackers. Some of the markings were white supremacist slogans such as the anti-Muslim phrase "Remove Kebab" and the number "14", a reference to Fourteen Words.

His armoured vest had at least seven loaded .223/5.56 magazines in the front pockets. He also wore an airsoft helmet, which held the head-mounted GoPro he used for his live stream. Police also found four incendiary devices in Tarrant's car; they were defused by the New Zealand Defence Force. He said, on the livestream, that he had planned to set the mosque on fire.

== Events ==
Timeline of events 15 March 2019, times are NZDT (UTC+13)
| Time | Event |
|---|---|
| 1:40 p.m. | Tarrant enters the Al Noor Mosque |
| 1:41 p.m. | First 111 call received by police |
| 1:42 p.m. | Police report over the radio of shots fired at mosque |
| 1:46:00 p.m. | Tarrant leaves Al Noor Mosque for Linwood Islamic centre |
| 1:46:58 p.m. | Police arrive at the intersection of Deans Ave and Riccarton Rd near mosque |
| 1:49:55 p.m. | Description of Tarrant's car and its registration shared over police radio |
| 1:51 p.m. | Police arrive outside mosque |
| 1:52 p.m. | Tarrant arrives at Linwood Islamic centre |
| 1:54:48 p.m. | Police enter Al Noor Mosque |
| 1:55 p.m. | Tarrant leaves Linwood Islamic centre |
| 1:56:09 p.m. | Incorrect reports of shots at Christchurch Hospital on police radio |
| 1:56:25 p.m. | Police car flagged down by person reporting shots at Linwood Islamic centre |
| 1:57 p.m. | First 111 call to police from the Linwood Islamic centre |
| 1:57:49 p.m. | Police pursuit initiated |
| 1:59 p.m. | Pursuit ends - Tarrant is apprehended |
| 1:59:25 p.m. | Police arrive at Linwood Islamic centre |

Deaths at both sites by citizenship
| New Zealand | 27 (Note: Including 11 with dual citizenship: 4 Egyptian, 3 Jordanian, 1 Bangladeshi, 1 Fijian, 1 Iraqi and 1 Pakistani.) | Pakistan | 8 | India | 5 | Bangladesh | 3 |
| Fiji | 2 | Indonesia | 1 | Jordan | 1 | Malaysia | 1 |
| Mauritius | 1 | Palestine | 1 | Turkey | 1 | Total | 51 |

The shootings took place at two locations. Fifty-one people aged between 3 and 77 died in the attacks: 44 were at the Al Noor Mosque (one died in hospital) and seven were at the Linwood Islamic Centre. The dead comprised 43 men, 4 women, and 4 boys. As well as the 51 dead, 89 people were injured, 40 from bullet wounds.

=== Al Noor Mosque ===
At 1:32 p.m., Tarrant started his live-stream that would last for 17 minutes on Facebook Live, starting with the drive to the Al Noor mosque and ending as he drove away. Just before the shooting, he played several songs, including "Serbia Strong", a Serb nationalist and anti-Muslim song; and "The British Grenadiers", a traditional British military marching song.

At 1:39 p.m., Tarrant drove his vehicle into the driveway serving apartments on the neighbouring section, with the Al Noor Mosque being adjacent over a fence to his left. He reversed the vehicle so it was facing back out onto Deans Avenue and parked. He then armed himself with the Mossberg 930 and Windham Weaponry AR-15-style rifle before walking round onto the site of the mosque.

At 1:40 p.m., as Tarrant approached the mosque, a worshipper greeted him with "Hello, brother!". Tarrant fired his shotgun nine times towards the front entrance, killing four worshippers. He then threw the shotgun to the ground and opened fire on people inside with the AR-15–style rifle, killing two other men down a hallway near the entrance and dozens more inside a prayer hall; a strobe light attached to the same AR-15 rifle disoriented victims.

Another worshipper, Naeem Rashid, charged at Tarrant and knocked him down, dislodging a magazine from his vest in the process. Tarrant quickly got back up and proceeded to shoot Rashid several times, murdering him. Rashid was posthumously awarded the Nishan-e-Shujaat and the New Zealand Cross, the highest awards of bravery in Pakistan and New Zealand, respectively.

Tarrant fired at worshippers in the prayer hall from close range. He then went outside, where he killed a man, discarded his Windham WW-15, and retrieved a Ruger AR-556 AR-15 from his car. He went to the mosque's southern gate and, from there, killed two people and injured a third in the car park as they were sheltering behind vehicles. He reentered the mosque and shot already-wounded people, then again went outside, where he killed a woman. Thereupon Tarrant drove over the deceased woman, leaving six minutes after he arrived at the mosque. He shot at fleeing worshippers and cars through the windscreen and closed window of his own car with the Remington Model 870 shotgun as he was driving towards the Linwood Islamic Centre.

At 1:46 p.m., police arrived near the mosque just as Tarrant was leaving, but his car was hidden by a bus, and at the time, no description of the vehicle had been provided, or that he had left. He drove eastwards on Bealey Avenue at up to 130 km/h (81 mph), weaving between lanes against oncoming traffic and driving onto a grass median strip. At 1:51 p.m., just after the livestream had ended due to a connection interruption, he aimed a shotgun at the driver of a vehicle on Avonside Drive and attempted to fire it twice, but it failed to fire on both occasions. The GoPro device attached to Tarrant's helmet continued recording until he was apprehended by police eight minutes later.

=== Linwood Islamic Centre ===
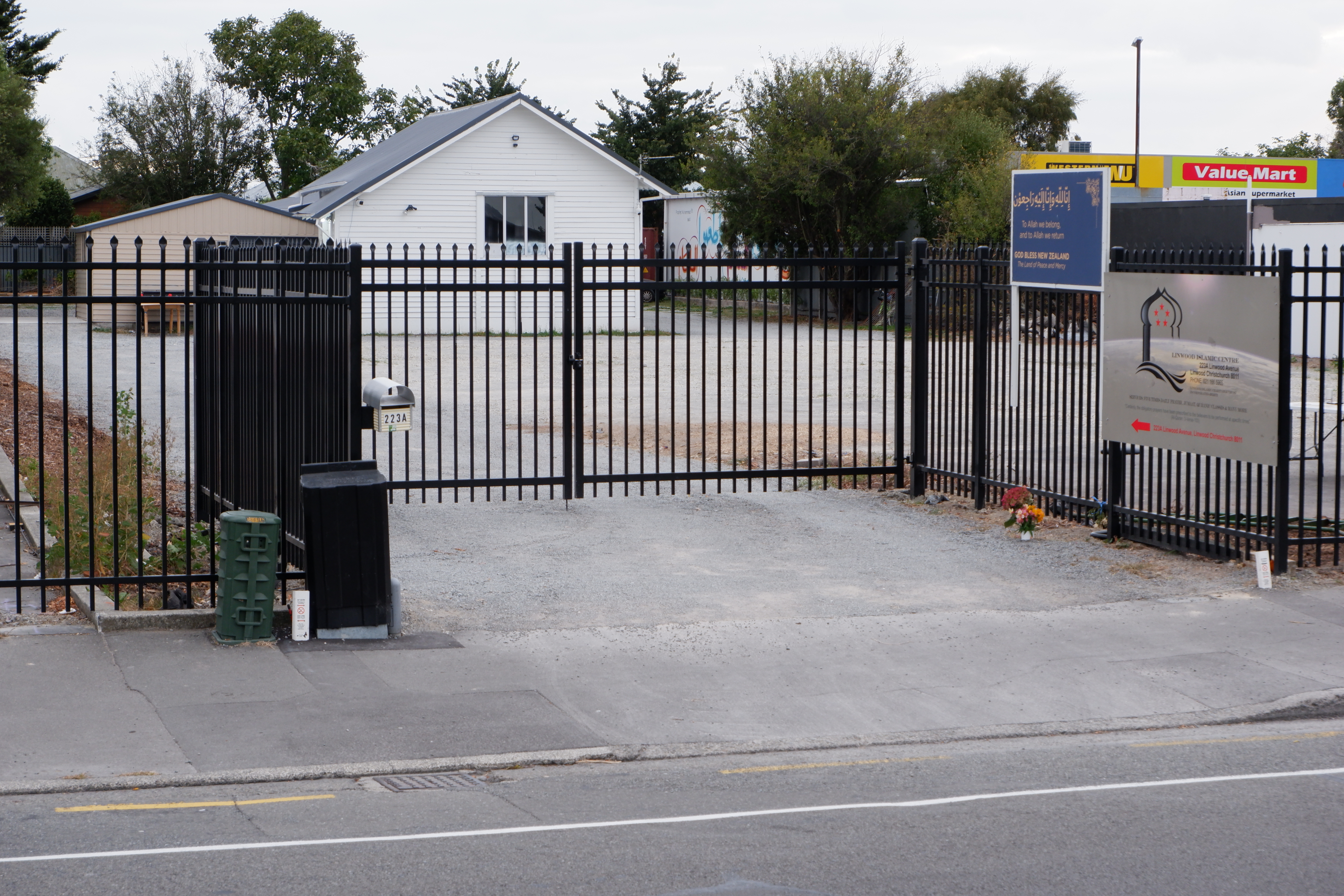
Linwood Islamic Centre, March 2020. At the time of the shootings, there was a building at the front of the section and access was along an ungated driveway to the left.

At 1:52 p.m., Tarrant arrived at the Linwood Islamic Centre, 5 kilometres (3 mi) east of the Al Noor Mosque, where there were about 100 worshippers. He parked his vehicle on the mosque's driveway, preventing other cars from entering or leaving. According to a witness, Tarrant was initially unable to find the mosque's main door, instead shooting people outside and through a window, killing four and alerting those inside.

A worshipper named Abdul Aziz Wahabzada ran outside. As Tarrant was retrieving more weapons from his car, Aziz threw a payment terminal at him. Tarrant fired back at Aziz, who picked up an empty shotgun that Tarrant had dropped. He took cover among nearby cars and attempted to draw Tarrant's attention by shouting, "I'm here!" Regardless, Tarrant entered the mosque, where he shot and killed three people. When Tarrant returned to his car, Aziz confronted him again. Tarrant removed a bayonet from his vest but then retreated into his car instead of attacking Aziz. Tarrant drove away at 1:55 p.m., with Aziz throwing the shotgun at his car. Aziz was awarded the New Zealand Cross, New Zealand's highest award for bravery. In May 2023, he represented recipients of the Cross at the coronation of Charles III and Camilla. After a long period of being left vacant, the building was demolished in November 2023.

=== Tarrant's arrest ===
A silver 2005 Subaru Outback matching the description of Tarrant's vehicle was seen by a police unit, and a pursuit was initiated at 1:57 p.m. Two police officers rammed his car off the road with their vehicle, and Tarrant was arrested without resistance on Brougham Street in Sydenham at 1:59 p.m., 18 minutes after the first emergency call.

Tarrant later admitted that when he was arrested, he was on his way to attack a mosque in Ashburton, 90 km (56 mi) southwest of Christchurch. He also told the police that there were "nine more shooters", and that there were "like-minded" people in Dunedin, Invercargill, and Ashburton, but when interviewed later, he confirmed that he had acted alone.

== Livestreaming of the Al Noor Mosque shooting ==
The first shooting, starting from the drive to the Al Noor Mosque and ending on the way to the Linwood Islamic Centre, was live-streamed on Facebook Live using Tarrant's head-mounted GoPro camera. As a result, the shootings became the first successfully live-streamed far-right terror attack.

The link to the Facebook livestream was first posted on 8chan's /pol/ board, alongside links to the manifesto. The post included the following,

Well lads, it's time to stop shitposting and time to make a real life effort post. I will carry out and [sic] attack against the invaders, and will even livestream the attack via facebook [sic].

Fewer than 200 people watched the 17-minute livestream live, and none of them made a complaint to Facebook or notified the police. The livestream's perspective mirrored that of a first-person shooter video game.

=== Video distribution ===
Copies of the live-streamed video were widely reposted on the internet, including on Facebook. The video was quickly classified as "objectionable", making its usage a criminal offence.

Stuart Bender of Curtin University in Perth noted that the use of live video as an integral part of the attacks "makes [them] a form of 'performance crime' where the act of video recording and/or streaming the violence by the perpetrator is a central component of the violence itself, rather than being incidental."

=== Arrests and prosecutions ===
Several people were arrested for possessing or sharing the video or manifesto. The first was an 18-year-old man who was arrested and charged with inciting racial disharmony on the same day as the shooting.

On 20 March 2019, Philip Arps was charged with distributing objectionable material under the Films, Videos, and Publications Classification Act 1993 for sharing the video. He subsequently pleaded guilty to the charges on 20 March 2019. In June 2019, he was sentenced to 21 months' imprisonment.

Conspiracy theorist Richard Sivell faced trial for possession of the video on 30 October 2024. His first appearance was at Taupō District Court in August 2024. In a separate case, Sivell was convicted of threatening to kill Jacinda Ardern in 2021-22.

=== Media outlets ===
Several media organisations in Australia and tabloid news websites in the UK broadcast parts of the video, up to the point Tarrant entered the building, despite pleas from the New Zealand Police not to show it. Sky Television New Zealand temporarily stopped its syndication of Sky News Australia after that network showed the footage, and said it was working with Sky News Australia to prevent further displays of the video. At least three Internet service providers in New Zealand blocked access to 8chan and other sites related to the attacks; and they temporarily blocked other sites hosting the video such as 4chan, LiveLeak, and Mega until they comply with requests to take down copies of the video. The administrator of the online message board Kiwi Farms refused a New Zealand Police request for the data of users who made posts related to Tarrant and the attack.

=== Social media companies ===
Various social media sites—including Facebook, YouTube, Reddit, and Twitter—said they were working to remove the video from their platforms, and would also remove content posted in support of the attacks. According to Facebook, no complaints were made about the video until 12 minutes after the live-stream ended; the original video from Tarrant himself had been viewed fewer than 200 times before Facebook was notified of its content, and it had been viewed only 4,000 times before it was removed, which happened within minutes of notification. Facebook created a digital hash fingerprint to detect further uploads after the video had been propagated on other sites. The company said it had blocked 1.5 million uploads of the video.

Reddit banned some "subreddits" for glorifying violence.

Microsoft proposed the establishment of industry-wide standards that would flag such content quickly, and a joint project to manage and control the spread of such information via social media.

Despite the networks' attempts to self-police, Australia introduced legislation that would punish content provider if that failed. The French Council of the Muslim Faith filed a lawsuit against Facebook and YouTube". Facebook has contested the French lawsuit.

On 15 May 2019, Jacinda Ardern and the French president, Emmanuel Macron, co-hosted a summit in Paris, calling for major technology companies to step up their efforts to combat violent extremism.

== Legal proceedings ==
=== Arraignment ===
Tarrant appeared in the Christchurch District Court on 16 March, where he was charged with one count of murder. The judge ordered the courtroom closed to the public except for accredited media and allowed the accused to be filmed and photographed on the condition that Tarrant's face be pixelated. In court, Tarrant smiled at reporters and made an inverted OK gesture below his waist, said to be a "white power" sign.

The case was transferred to the High Court, and Tarrant was remanded in custody as his lawyer did not seek bail. He was subsequently transferred to the country's only maximum-security unit at Auckland Prison. Tarrant lodged a formal complaint regarding his prison conditions, on the grounds that he had no access to newspapers, television, Internet, visitors, or phone calls. Corrections said Tarrant was being held in accordance with the law and Tarrant later dropped the complaint. On 4 April 2019, police announced they had increased the total number of charges to 89, 50 for murder and 39 for attempted murder, with other charges still under consideration. At the next hearing on 5 April 2019, Tarrant was ordered by the judge to undergo a psychiatric assessment of his mental fitness to stand trial.

On 20 May, a new charge of engaging in a terrorist act was laid against Tarrant under the Terrorism Suppression Act 2002. One murder charge and one attempted murder charge were also added, bringing the total to 51 and 40, respectively.

=== June 2019 not guilty plea and pre-trial detention ===
On 14 June 2019, Tarrant appeared at the Christchurch High Court via audio-visual link from Auckland Prison. Through his lawyer, he pleaded not guilty to one count of engaging in a terrorist act, 51 counts of murder, and 40 counts of attempted murder. Mental health assessments had indicated no issues regarding his fitness to plead or stand trial. The trial was set down for 2 June 2020.

During his time in prison awaiting trial, Tarrant sent seven letters, one of which was subsequently posted on the internet message boards 4chan and 8chan. The Department of Corrections and its minister were criticised for allowing this.

=== March 2020 guilty plea and sentencing arrangements ===
On 25 March 2020, Tarrant issued his lawyers with written instructions confirming he wanted to change his pleas to guilty. In response, court authorities began making arrangements for the case to be called as soon as possible, in the midst of the COVID-19 lockdown. On 26 March, Tarrant appeared at the Christchurch High Court via audio-visual link from Auckland Prison. He pleaded guilty to all 92 charges. Due to the lockdown, the general public was barred from the hearing, although reporters and representatives for the Al Noor and Linwood mosques were present in the courtroom. On 10 July, the government waivered visa requirements and helped finance overseas-based victims wanting to return for the sentencing. On 13 July, Tarrant dismissed his lawyers to represent himself during sentencing.

=== August 2020 sentencing and February 2026 appeal ===
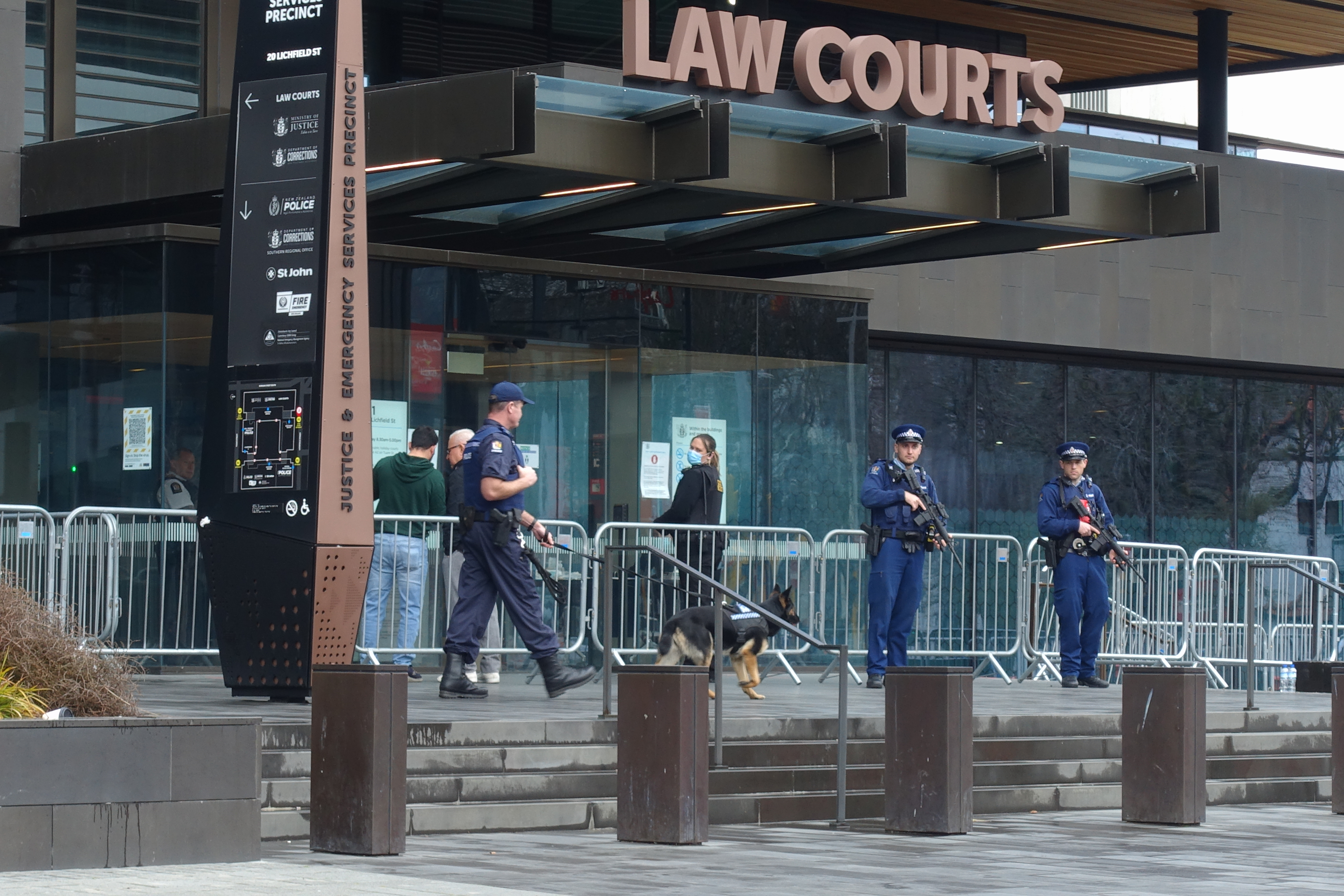
Armed police outside Christchurch courthouse during Tarrant's sentencing

The Crown prosecutors demonstrated how Tarrant had planned the two shootings in addition to further attacks, while survivors and relatives gave victim impact statements.

Televised sentencing began on 24 August 2020 by Justice Cameron Mander at the Christchurch High Court, Tarrant was sentenced to life imprisonment without parole on each of the 51 murders,, 12 years to run concurrently on each charge of attempted murder, and life imprisonment for engaging in a terrorist act and 40 attempted murders. The sentence is New Zealand's first for a terrorism conviction. It was also the first for life without parole. Justice Mander said Tarrant's crimes were "so wicked that even if you are detained until you die, it will not exhaust the requirements of punishment and denunciation." Tarrant did not oppose the sentence proposed and declined to address the court.

In February 2026, the Court of Appeal heard Tarrant say he had pleaded guilty under duress, a claim rejected as "utterly devoid of merit".

Following the 2020 sentencing, Deputy Prime Minister Winston Peters called for Tarrant to serve his sentence in Australia to avoid New Zealand having to pay the costs for his life imprisonment. The then cost of keeping Tarrant behind bars was over NZ$4,930 per day due to the extra security needed, and the total cost until his death would likely run into millions. This compared to an average prisoner cost of $338 per day. Jacinda Ardern said there was no legal basis for the proposal. Justice Minister Andrew Little said parliament would need to pass a law to deport Tarrant to Australia. On 28 August, Australian prime minister Scott Morrison and Australian home affairs minister Peter Dutton advised that, while no formal request had been made by the New Zealand Government to repatriate Tarrant to Australia and for him to serve his life sentence in an Australian correctional facility, the Australian Government was open to considering a request.

== Initial post-event reaction ==
=== World leaders and New Zealand government reaction ===
Elizabeth II, New Zealand's head of state, said she was "deeply saddened" by the attacks. Other politicians and world leaders also condemned the attacks. The prime minister of Pakistan, Imran Khan, announced that the Pakistani emigrant who charged at Tarrant before being murdered would be posthumously honoured with a national award for his courage. The president of Turkey, Recep Tayyip Erdoğan, showed footage taken by Tarrant to his supporters at campaign rallies for upcoming local elections. The New Zealand and Australian governments, as well as Turkey's main opposition party, criticised his actions. US president Donald Trump condemned the "horrible massacre". When asked after the attacks if he thought white nationalists were a growing threat around the world, Trump replied, "I don't really. I think it's a small group of people that have very, very serious problems. It's certainly a terrible thing." Malaysian prime minister Mahathir Mohamad expressed deep regret over the terrorist attack. He said he hoped the New Zealand government would bring the perpetrator to justice. The President of China, Xi Jinping, sent a message of condolence to Governor-General Patsy Reddy.

In response to this incident, the United Nations designated 15 March as the International Day to Combat Islamophobia.

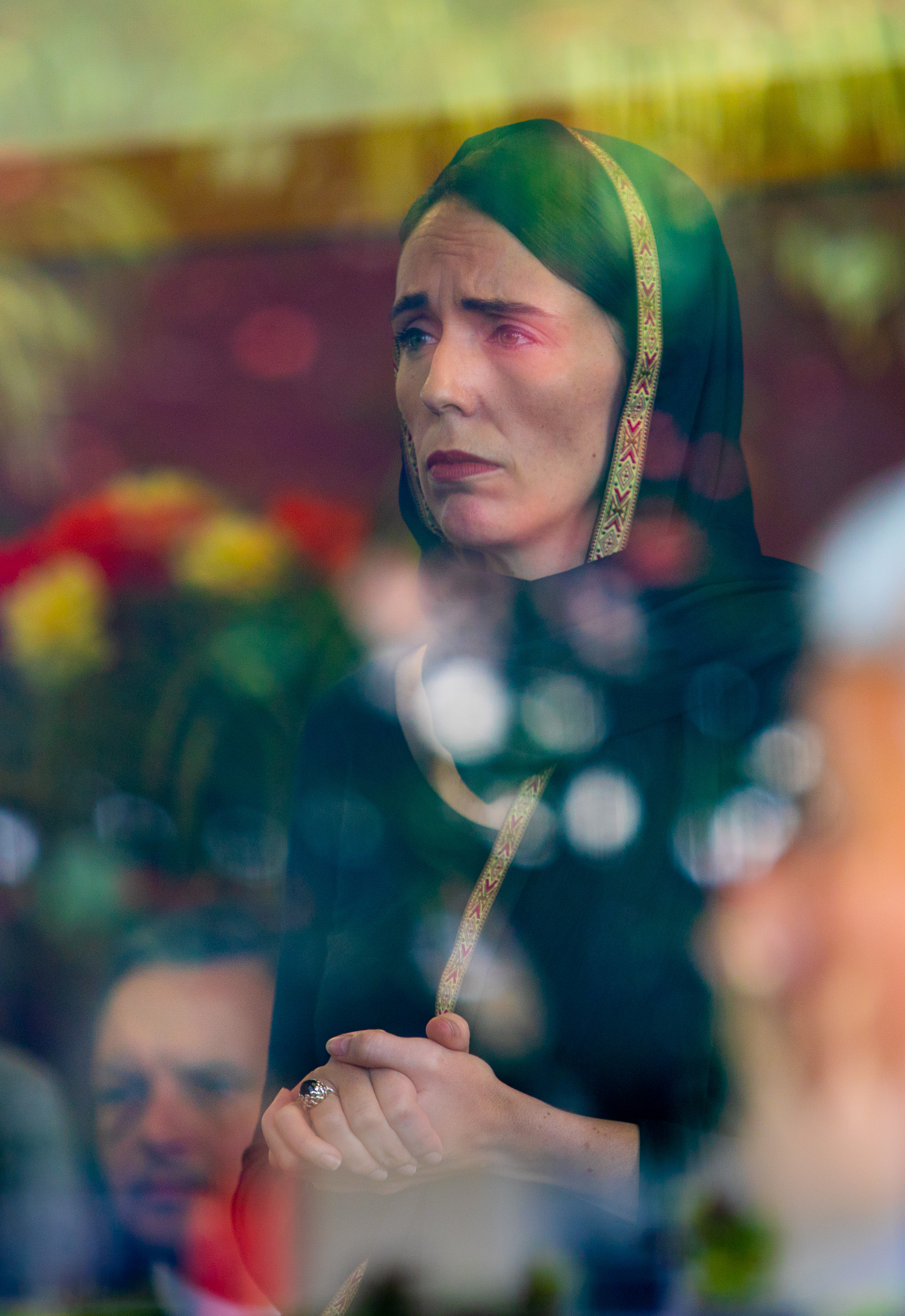
Prime Minister Jacinda Ardern visited members of the Muslim community at the Phillipstown Community Hub in Christchurch the day after the attack.

The prime minister, Jacinda Ardern, described it as "one of New Zealand's darkest days". The country's terrorism threat level was raised to high. Security was increased at parliament. Police advised mosques across the country to close. In Dunedin, the police searched a house rented by Tarrant, and cordoned off part of the surrounding street in Andersons Bay because Tarrant had indicated on social media that he had originally planned to target the Al Huda Mosque there.

Ardern described the event as a "well-planned" terrorist attack. and said she would render the person accused of the attacks "nameless" while urging the public to speak the victims' names instead. Flags on public buildings were directed to be flown at half-mast. In May 2019, the NZ Transport Agency offered to replace any vehicle number plates with the prefix "GUN" on request for free.

On 1 September 2020, Ardern used her personal power under section 22 of the Terrorism Suppression Act 2002 to designate Tarrant a "terrorist entity", thereby freezing his assets.

=== Resultant events within New Zealand society ===
==== Cross-section of reactions ====
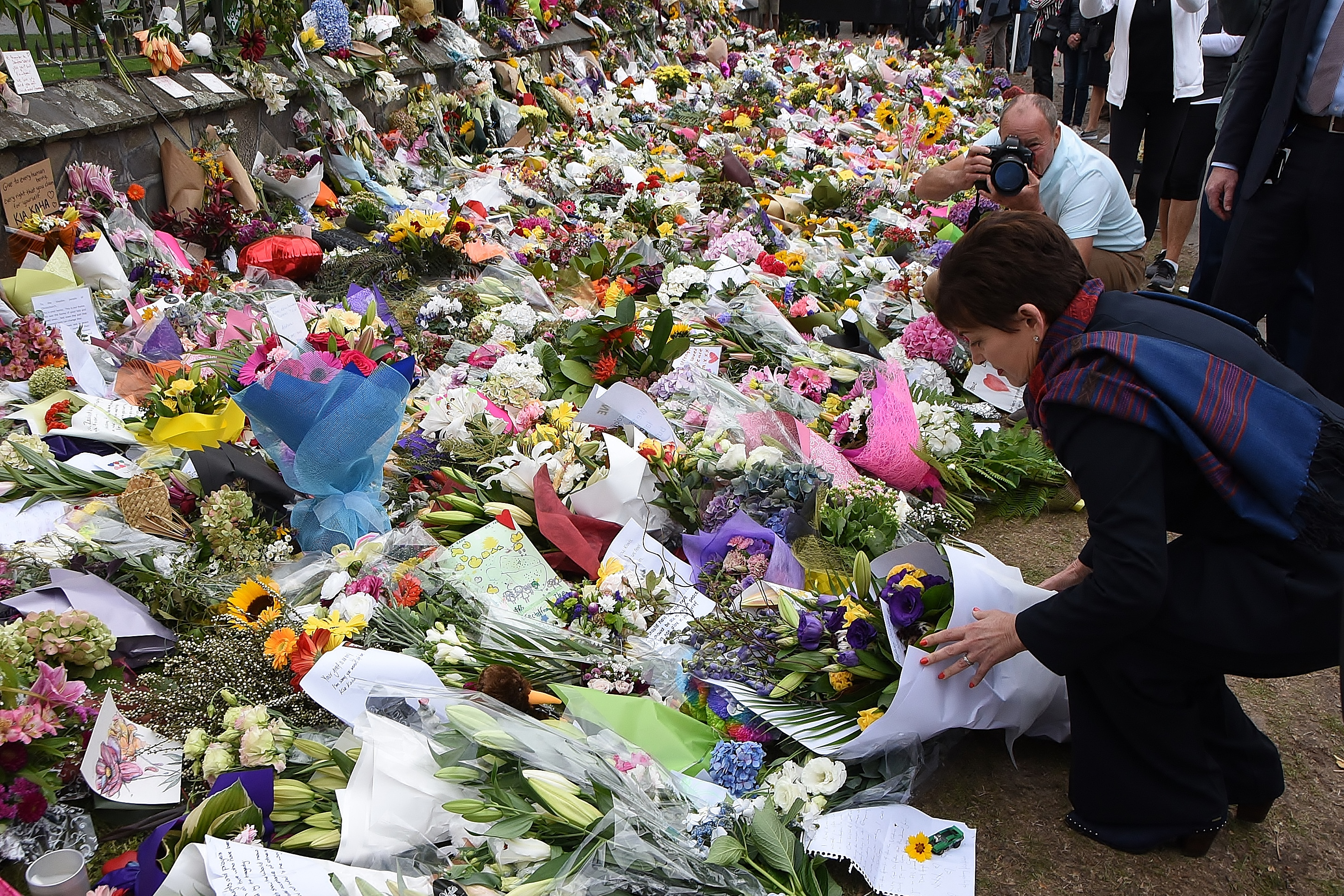
Patsy Reddy laying flowers at the Christchurch Botanic Gardens on 19 March

Within an hour of the attack, all schools in the city were placed in lockdown. This lasted for nearly three hours, until after school closure and some parents expressed frustration at not being allowed to collect their children.

In response to security concerns, the University of Otago postponed its sesquicentennial street parade which had been scheduled for 16 March.

The third test cricket match between New Zealand and Bangladesh, scheduled to commence at Hagley Oval in Hagley Park on 16 March, was likewise cancelled due to security concerns. The Bangladesh team were planning to attend Friday prayer at the Al Noor Mosque and were moments from entering the building when the incident began. The players then fled on foot to Hagley Oval. Two days later, Canterbury withdrew from their match against Wellington in the Plunket Shield cricket tournament. Likewise, the Super Rugby match between the Crusaders, based in Christchurch, and Highlanders, based in Dunedin, due to be played the next day, was cancelled as "a mark of respect for the events". After the attacks, there were renewed calls to rename the Crusaders team, since its name derives from the medieval Crusades against Muslims.

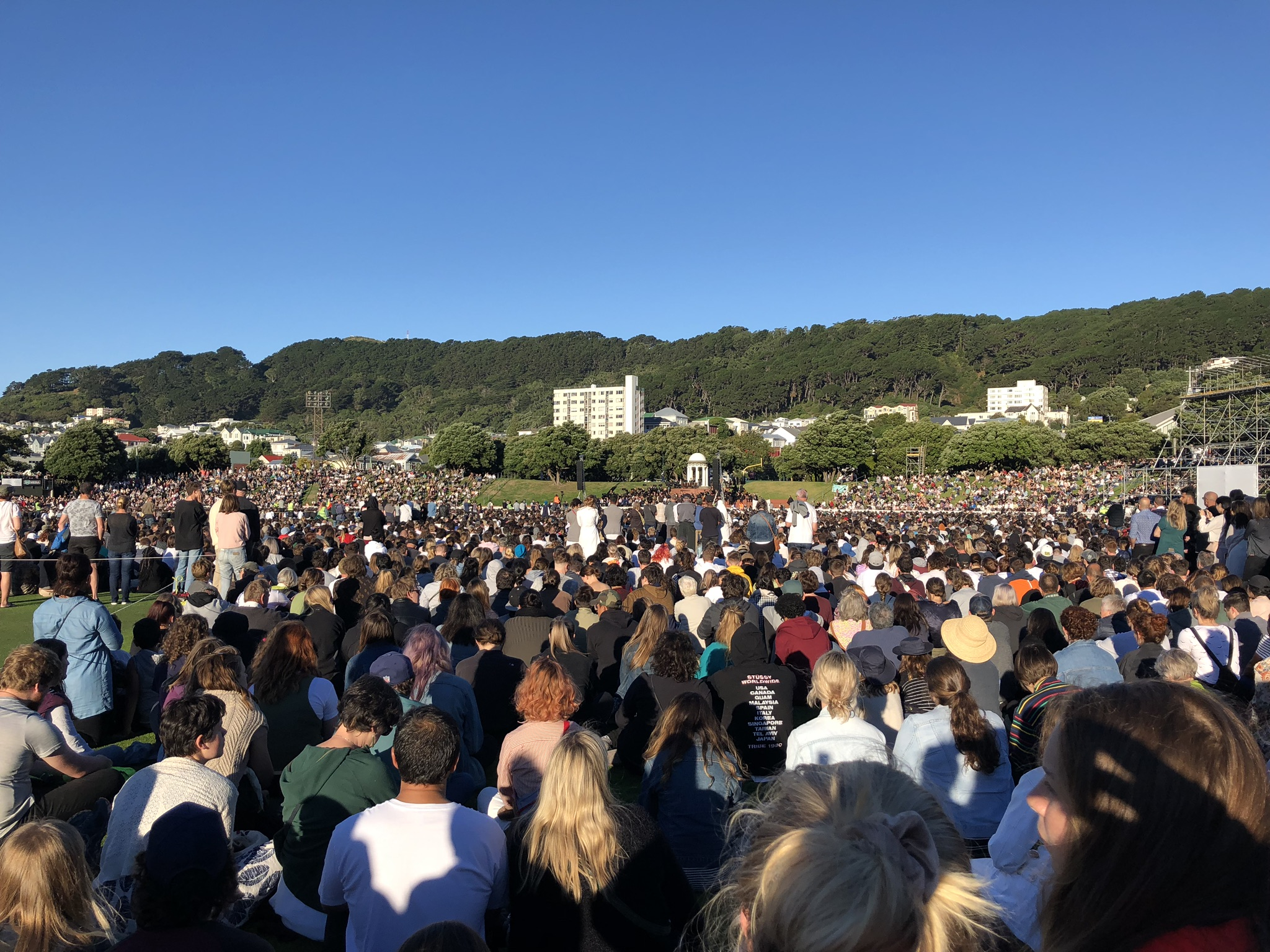
Vigil in Wellington for the victims of the attack

Some pre-arranged music and entertainment events were cancelled in the shooting's wake.

Mosques around the world became the focus of vigils, messages, and floral tributes.

As a mark of sympathy and solidarity, school pupils and other groups performed haka and waiata to honour those killed in the attacks.

One week after the attacks, an open-air Friday prayer service attended by 20,000 people was held in Hagley Park. who said, "New Zealand mourns with you. We are one." The imam of the Al Noor Mosque thanked New Zealanders for their support and added, "We are broken-hearted but we are not broken." A national remembrance service was held on 29 March, a fortnight after the attacks.

Operation Whakahaumanu was launched by police soon after the attacks to reassure the public by investigating people with a similar ideology to the gunman. They visited many schools, businesses, and religious places. In Canterbury, there were about 600 persons of interest and hundreds of properties were searched.

On 18 March 2019, the Australian Federal Police conducted raids on the homes of Tarrant's sister and mother near Coffs Harbour and Maclean in New South Wales. Police said the raids were carried out to assist New Zealand Police with their investigations into the shootings, adding that Tarrant's sister and mother were assisting the investigation.

A 30-year-old man said he was arrested when he arrived at Papanui High School to pick up his 13-year-old brother-in-law. He was in camouflage clothing, which he said he habitually wore. He claimed to be seeking compensation for a wrongful arrest, but no formal complaint was filed. The actions were defended by police, who mentioned the threat level after the massacre and that they had to deal with reports possibly related to the attacks. He was later jailed for an unrelated incident.

==== Media response ====
For the three months following the shooting, almost 1,000 reports were published in major news outlets in New Zealand. Less than 10% of news reports published by major media outlets mentioned Tarrant's name. Susanna Every-Palmer, an academic psychiatrist, suggested that the media made a moral choice to deny Tarrant exposure and not sensationalise his views, deviating from how similar events internationally were covered in the media. The court required the media to pixelate Tarrant's face when covering the legal proceedings, thus, within New Zealand, he remained largely faceless and nameless. Instead, media coverage focused largely on the victims and their families. In contrast, the media response in Australia focused on the attack's violence, the attacker, and the manifesto. The Herald Sun wrote dramatic descriptions of victims being shot and used poetic devices to create more vivid imagery. Coverage of the victims was largely focused on physical horrors such as bloodshed, injuries, and graves being dug.

==== Fundraisers ====
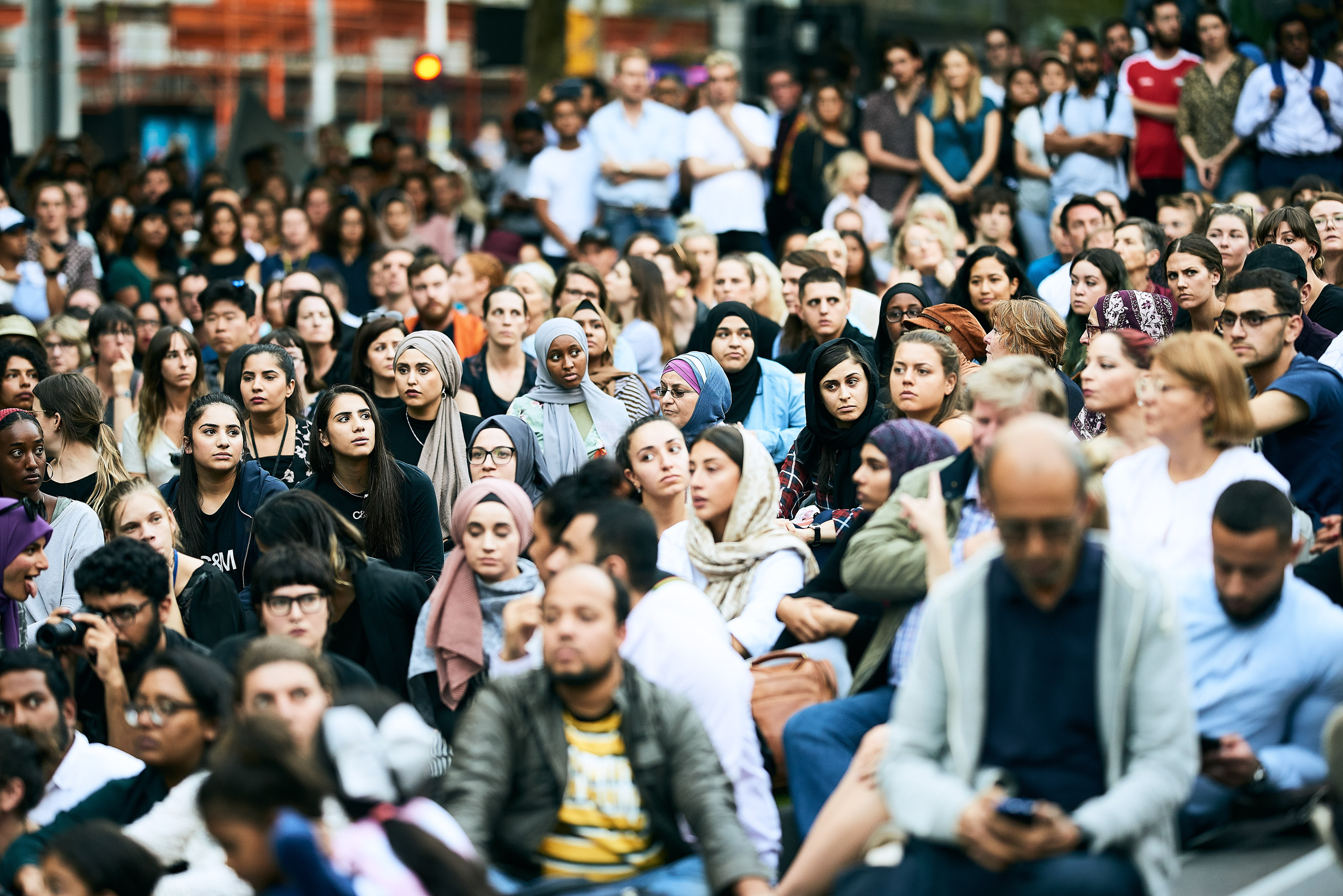
Vigil in Melbourne, Australia

Within days, separate fundraising pledges to support the victims' families had reached over $10 million and $8.4 million. In late June, it was reported that the Jewish Federation of Greater Pittsburgh had raised almost NZ$1 million for the victims of the shootings.

==== Islamic groups and far right groups reaction ====
Ahmed Bhamji, chair of the largest mosque in New Zealand, spoke at a rally on 23 March in front of one thousand people, claimed that Mossad was behind the attack. The chairman of the Federation of Islamic Associations of New Zealand said that Bhamji's statement did not represent other New Zealand Muslims. The attack was condemned by the Secretary General of the Muslim Council of Britain. The Council on American-Islamic Relations called on President Trump to condemn the shootings.

The attack was used by the Islamic State calling for attacks on the "nations of the Cross and the apostate" in retaliation. Two New Zealand-based anti-immigration groups, the Dominion Movement and the New Zealand National Front, condemned the attacks, distanced themselves from the perpetrator, and shut their websites down. Some in the broader far-right culture celebrated the attacks and "sanctified" Tarrant as a central figure. Tarrant's manifesto was translated and distributed in more than a dozen different languages with a number of supporters on 8chan making photo and video edits of the shooting. Some extremists were inspired by Tarrant, committing violent incidents and deadly attacks of their own, such as those in Poway, El Paso, and Bærum. The United Kingdom's domestic intelligence service, MI5, launched an inquiry into Tarrant's possible links to the British far-right.

==== Films ====
In May 2019, a proposed movie entitled Hello Brother, based on the shootings, was dropped. It had been criticised for failing to consult the local Muslim community. In August 2021, the film was put on hold.

Widows of Shuhada (widows of martyrs) was the name of a Radio New Zealand (RNZ) documentary series about the widows of four men who were killed in the attack.

In June 2021, funds for a film called They are Us began being sought. A spokesperson for the Prime Minister clarified that Ardern and the New Zealand government had no involvement with the film. It was also felt casting an Australian as Ardern was questionable; while this was not an emphasised issue it was seen as emblematic of the foreign, not local, desire to make the film. Several representatives of the New Zealand Muslim community also questioned the timing and appropriateness of the film. A draft script was then leaked in July 2021 and was criticised by politicians. Later that month the production had been put on hold until the producers had undertaken a full consultation with the country's Muslim community.

== Enduring formal steps taken in New Zealand ==
==== Gun laws ====
Gun laws in New Zealand came under scrutiny in the aftermath, specifically the legality of military-style semi-automatic rifles. In 2018, it was reported that of the estimated 1.5 million firearms in New Zealand, 15,000 were registered military style semi-automatic weapons as well as at least 50,000 unregistered A-Category semi-automatics. As Philip Alpers of GunPolicy.org noted, "New Zealand is almost alone with the United States in not registering 96 percent of its firearms ... one can assume that the ease of obtaining these firearms may have been a factor in his decision to commit the crime in Christchurch." Cabinet considered creating a firearms register.

On the day of the attack, Ardern announced that gun laws would change. On 21 March, Ardern announced a ban on semi-automatic weapons. As an interim measure, the government reclassified some semi-automatic rifles and shotguns, requiring police approval to buy them. The Arms (Prohibited Firearms, Magazines, and Parts) Amendment Act 2019 was introduced in the House of Representatives on 1 April 2019 and passed its final reading on 10 April, and became law shortly afterwards. All legally obtained semiautomatic and military-grade firearms and their relevant ammunition were able to be handed over to police in a buy-back scheme. The scheme was initiated in July 2019, and lasted six months. As at 21 December 2019, 33,619 hand-ins had been completed, 56,250 firearms had been collected, 2,717 firearms had been modified, and 194,245 parts had been collected. Police Minister Stuart Nash hailed the buy-back scheme as a success. In contrast, a spokeswoman for the Council of Licensed Firearms Owners, said the buyback had been a failure, claiming that there were 170,000 prohibited guns in New Zealand, so "50,000 was not a number to boast about".

==== Coroner's inquiry ====
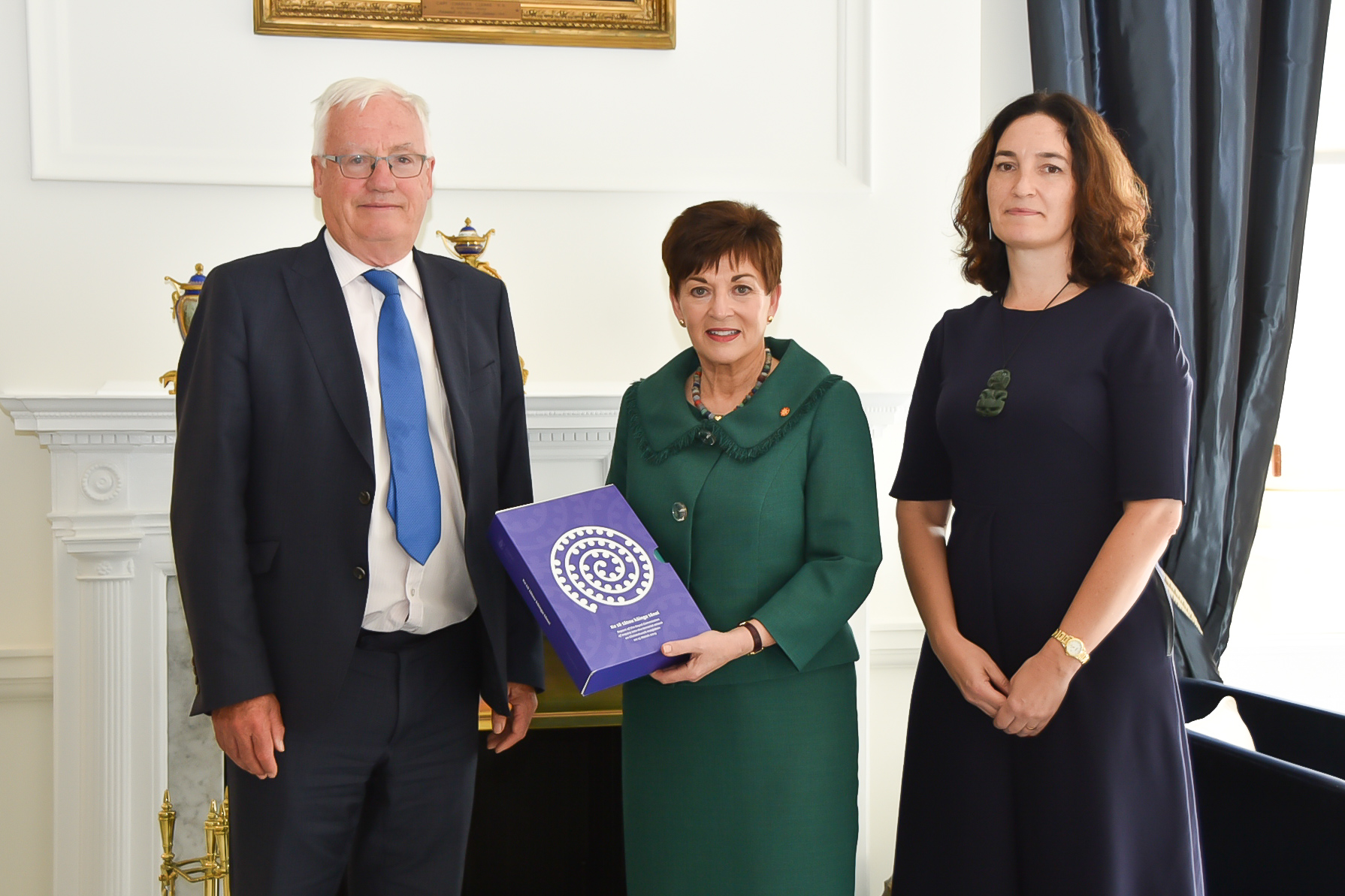
Governor-General Patsy Reddy (centre) receiving the report of the Royal Commission of Inquiry from Young and commissioner Jacqui Caine at Government House, Wellington, on 26 November 2020.

In October 2023, the Coroner's inquiry into the Christchurch mosque shootings began. It was a coronial inquiry into the mosque shootings. It followed criminal proceedings and the start of a Royal Commission of Inquiry. The coronial report identified 12 issues to be examined at the hearing. It covered many aspects of the shootings and the response given.

==== Royal commission of inquiry ====
On 24 May 2019, the cabinet announced it would take the form of a Royal Commission of Inquiry, which was stated soon after and chaired by justice Sir William Young of the Supreme Court. On 26 November 2020, the Royal Commission presented the report to the government, which was soon after made public. It made 44 recommendations, including the establishment of a new national intelligence agency specialising in counterterrorism strategies all of which the government agreed to implement. The inquiry was criticised by some Islamic community groups, such as the Islamic Women's Council, for not going far enough in its criticisms of government and police organisations. In August 2024, the government confirmed it would implement 36 of the 44 Royal Commission's recommendations. Following the recommendations of the Royal Commission of Inquiry into the 2019 terrorist attack, the New Zealand Government set up a research centre, called He Whenua Taurikura, in Wellington to look into violent extremism. From 2022, the centre had been run through a trust and was known as the "Centre of Research Excellence for Preventing and Countering Violent Extremism". Funding for the trust was withdrawn in stages in 2024, a step criticised by the trustees and by other interested parties. Prior to the final funding cut announcement in 2024, critics of the centre had disparaged its research, claiming it "lacked researchers experienced enough in the field."

=== Awards ===
On 6 July 2022, Governor-General Cindy Kiro presented the New Zealand Cross to Linwood Mosque survivor Abdul Aziz and the late Naeem Rashid for confronting Tarrant. In addition, Kiro presented the New Zealand Bravery Decoration to Senior Constables Scott Carmody and Jim Manning for apprehending the terrorist; and to Liam Beale and Wayne Maley for helping survivors of the Al Noor mosque. In addition, Lance Bradford, Mike Robinson and Mark Miller (the latter posthumously) received the New Zealand Bravery Medal for helping victims of the mosque shootings.

In mid-October 2019, the two police officers who apprehended Tarrant were awarded bravery awards. Due to the legal proceedings against Tarrant at the time, the two officers had interim name suppression, but in December 2019, this was lifted.

== Copycat shootings ==
The attack had a lasting worldwide legacy attributed to the perpetrator's thorough planning of the event and the livestreamed nature of the initial shooting which made it easy for graphic footage to be shared online. As such, many murderous incidents and plots have been inspired by the attack. In each of the first five years following the shootings, there was at least one copycat attack directly inspired by the events of Christchurch. Terrorgram, which is considered an online terrorist group in a handful of countries, formed in the late 2010s and early 2020s as an indirect consequence of the shooting. The group promotes Tarrant and his copycats as saints, urging other accelerationists to mimic Tarrant's crime.

== See also ==
- Cave of the Patriarchs massacre
- Far-right terrorism in Australia
- Halle synagogue shooting
- List of massacres in New Zealand
- List of rampage killers (religious, political, or ethnic crimes)
