= Linwood Islamic Centre =

Former mosque in Christchurch, New Zealand

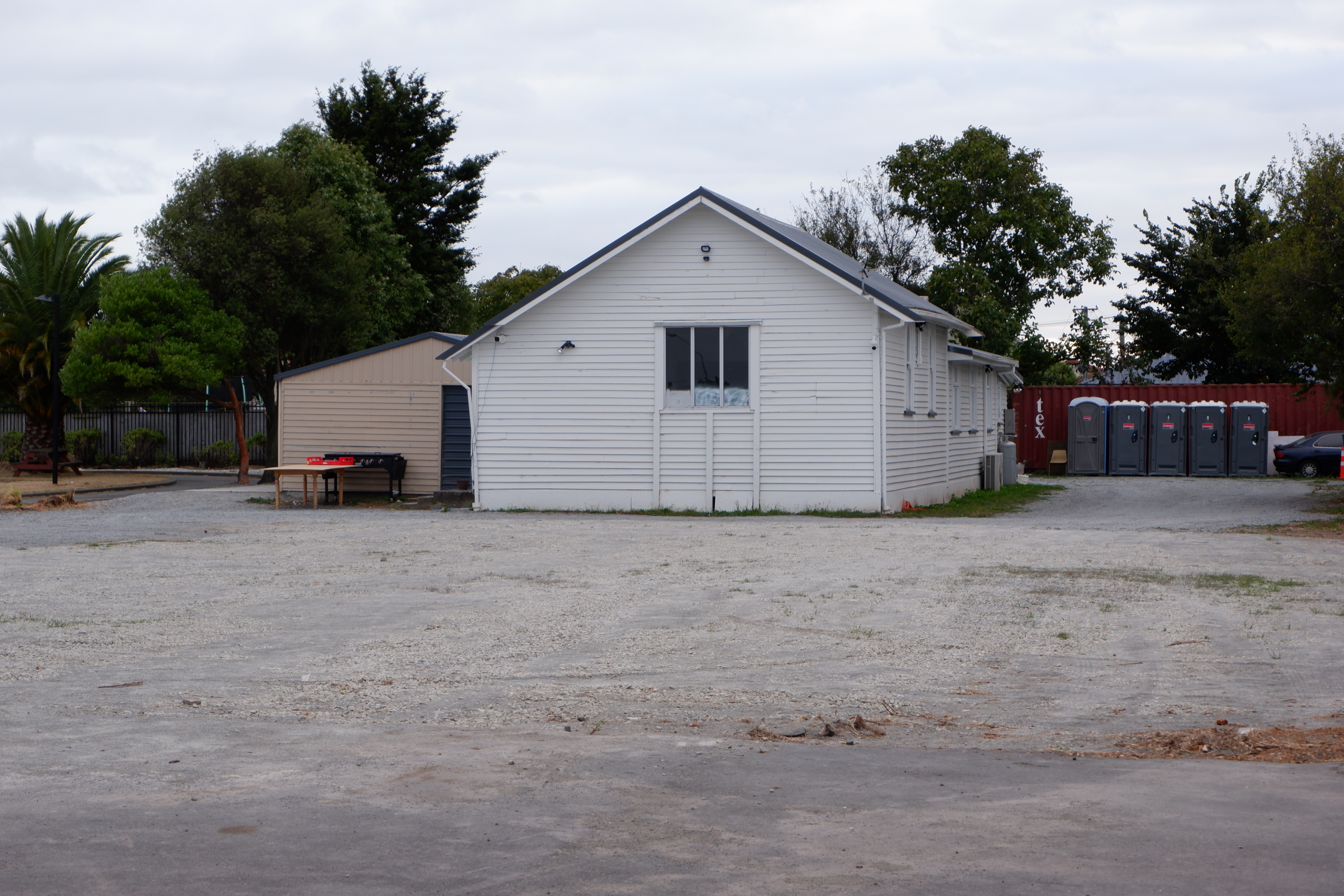
- Linwood Islamic Centre in 2020, prior to its demolition

- Location of the former mosque in Christchurch

Religion
- Affiliation: Sunni Islam (former)
- Ecclesiastical or organisational status: Mosque (2018–2023)
- Ownership: Linwood Islamic Charitable Trust
- Status: Demolished

Location
- Location: 223A Linwood Avenue, Linwood, Christchurch
- Country: New Zealand
- Coordinates: 43°31′57″S 172°40′21″E

Architecture
- Established: 2018
- Demolished: 2023

The Linwood Islamic Centre was a Sunni Islamic mosque in Linwood, Christchurch, New Zealand. Opened in 2018 and later targeted in the 2019 Christchurch mosque shootings, the mosque was demolished in 2023 with plans to establish a new mosque on the site.

== History ==
The mosque opened in early 2018 on the grounds of the former Christchurch Baháʼí Centre and the building had most recently been the Linwood Community Centre. The building was formerly a Sunday School Hall in Highstead Road and was moved to Linwood in the late 1980s. It was the second mosque to open in Christchurch. It is owned by the Linwood Islamic Charitable Trust, which was founded in 2017.

On 15 March 2019, the Linwood Islamic Centre and the Al Noor Mosque were targeted in the Christchurch mosque shootings. Of the 51 people killed and the 40 people injured in the attack, seven people were killed and five others injured here. It reopened on 23 March, the same day as Al Noor.

In November 2023, a company was engaged to demolish the building. With sponsorship from an Emirati fund, a NZ$20 million new mosque and multipurpose hall will be built, to accommodate approximately 650 worshippers.
