= Al Noor Mosque, Christchurch =

Mosque in Christchurch, New Zealand

Al Noor Mosque
- مسجد النور
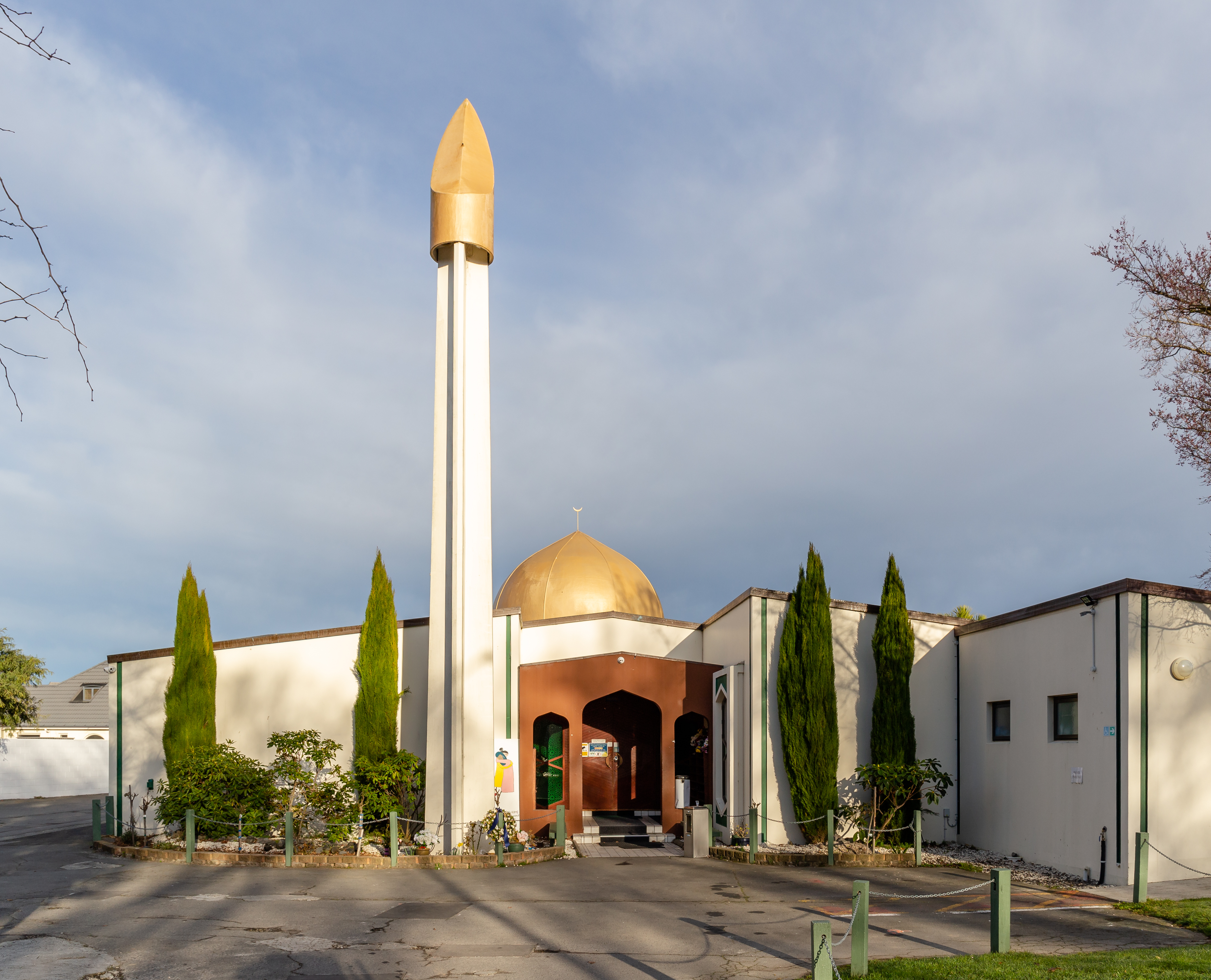
- Al Noor Mosque in August 2019

- Location in Christchurch

Religion
- Affiliation: Sunni Islam
- Ecclesiastical or organisational status: Mosque
- Status: Active

Location
- Location: Christchurch, Canterbury
- Country: New Zealand
- Coordinates: 43°31′58.6″S 172°36′42.2″E

Architecture
- Groundbreaking: 1983
- Completed: 1985

Specifications
- Dome: One
- Minaret: One

The Al Noor Mosque (Arabic: مسجد النور, Masjid al-Noor) is a Sunni mosque in the Christchurch suburb of Riccarton in New Zealand. It was built between 1983 and 1985 by the Muslim Association of Canterbury, an organisation founded in 1977 that also manages the mosque building. It was the primary target of the Christchurch mosque shootings of 15 March 2019.

== History ==
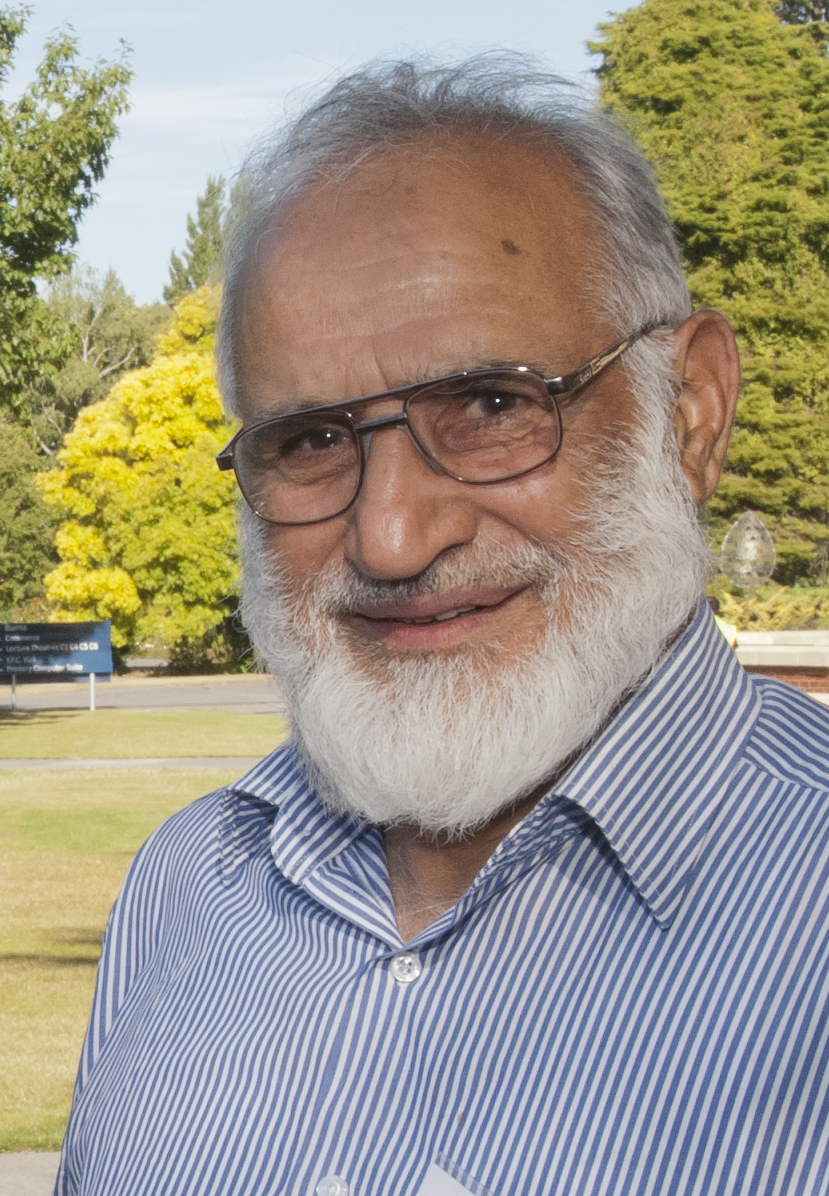
Quazi in 2013

Al Noor Mosque was founded by the Muslim Association of Canterbury. One prominent member was agricultural scientist Hanif Quazi, who at that time was working for the Department of Scientific and Industrial Research based in Lincoln. The mosque broke ground in June 1983. The main construction contract was let in July 1984 to M. L. Paynter Ltd for NZ$500,000. The government of Saudi Arabia donated $460,000 towards its construction. The first Friday prayer was held in the mosque on 21 June 1985, coinciding with Eid al-Fitr. It was the second mosque in New Zealand.

In 2003, the Christchurch Muslim community organised a "National Māori Muslim Day" at the mosque. By 2015, the mosque had 550 members.

=== Terror attack ===
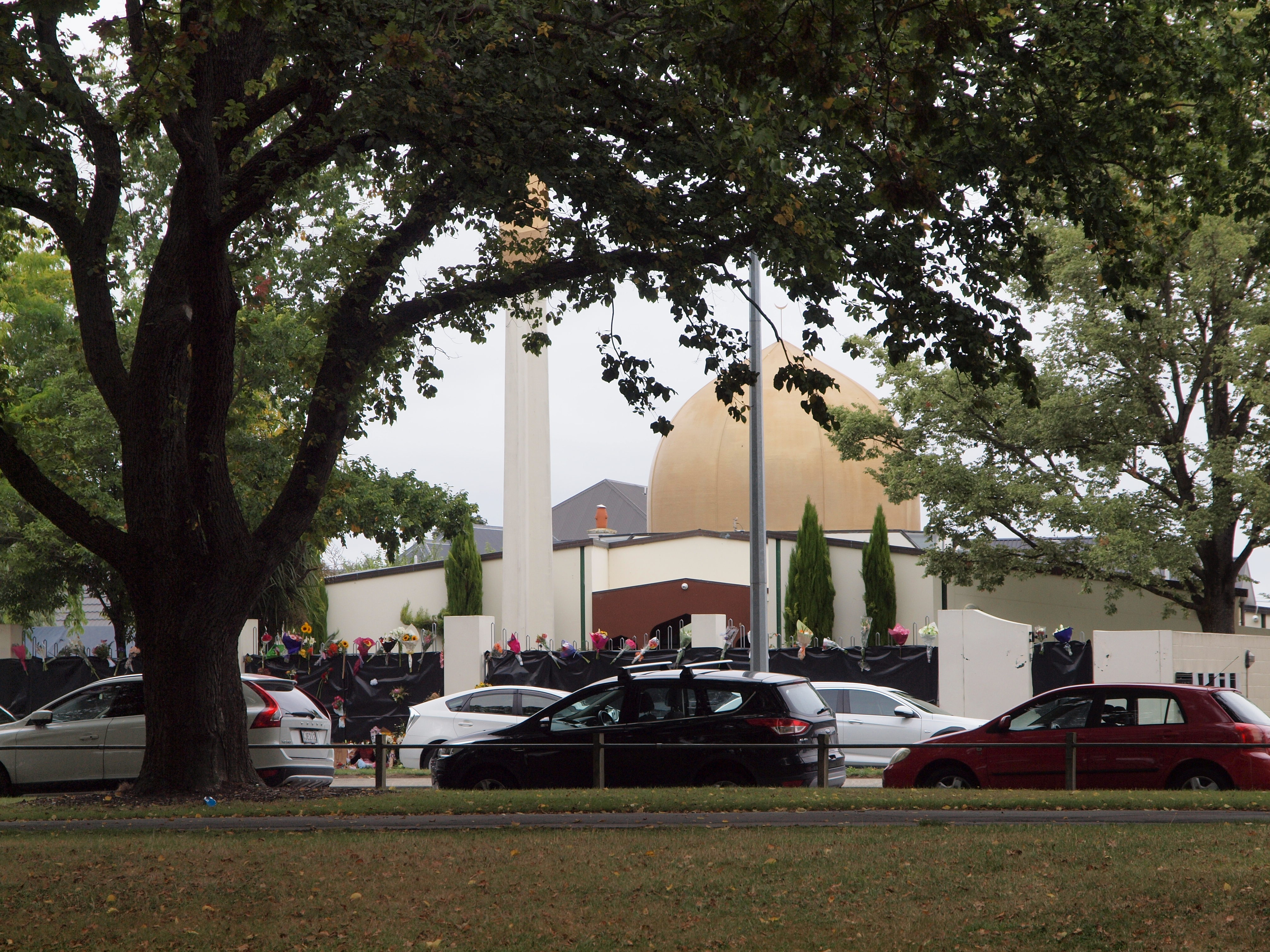
Al Noor Mosque after the terror attacks, with flowers placed along the top of the fence.

On 15 March 2019, the site was one of two targets in a terrorist attack at Christchurch. A majority of the victims were at Al Noor: of the 51 people fatally shot and the 40 people injured overall in the attack, 44 victims died and another 35 survived gunshot wounds in the mosque. The mosque reopened on 23 March. The lone attacker was convicted of multiple murder, attempted murder, and terrorism charges on 2 June 2020, and sentenced to life in prison without parole on 27 August the same year.

== Controversies ==
In 2003, controversy arose within the local Muslim community over the mosque's management. The arrival of new members of Arab and Somali origin sparked tension with the earlier members of South Asian origin, who have a different culture and have a different interpretation of Islam.

In 2014, an Australian convert was alleged by his mother and stepfather to have been introduced to radical Islam at Al Noor before going to Yemen to join al-Qaeda, an allegation denied by Hisham el-Zeiny, the mosque's imam. The president of the Federation of Islamic Associations of New Zealand, Anwar Ghani, said that mosque officials had told a Salafi follower not to promote his views there. El-Zeiny said that many Muslims were angry about US drone strikes in Yemen and that the mosque's leadership was "spending most of [its] time trying to lessen the effect."

== See also ==
- Islam in New Zealand
