= 1991 New Zealand bravery awards =

The 1991 New Zealand bravery awards were announced via a Special Honours List dated 19 December 1991. Twelve of the 33 recipients were recognised for acts of bravery during the Aramoana Massacre on 13 November 1990.

== In relation to the Aramoana Massacre ==
=== George Cross (GC) ===
- Stewart James Guthrie – sergeant, New Zealand Police. Posthumous

On 13 November 1990 at the seaside resort of Aramoana, located on the outskirts of Dunedin, a young man ran amok with a firearm and massacred twelve people before being fatally shot by Police the next day.

Sergeant Guthrie, the officer in charge of the Port Chalmers Police Station, was the sole duty officer at the time the incident was reported and was able to identify the gunman as a person he knew. Sergeant Guthrie went to the Aramoana township alone and armed. On arrival he was able to call on the services of another Constable. Sergeant Guthrie took immediate command of the situation, armed the Constable with a privately owned rifle and the pair reconnoitred the village. Their every movement was fraught with danger as they moved about the village being constantly reminded of their own danger by the extent of the visible carnage, the gunman having already killed twelve people. With limited resources available to him and impending darkness Sergeant Guthrie had the task of locating and containing the crazed gunman, dealing with the wounded and preventing further loss of life. On arrival near the gunman's house Sergeant Guthrie deployed the Constable to cover the front of the house while he located himself at the more dangerous position at the rear. A thin cordon of the gunman's house was later completed by the arrival of a Detective and two Constables. The gunman had been sighted within his house and it can only be presumed that Sergeant Guthrie chose the dangerous position based on his sense of responsibility and the fact that he knew the area and the gunman. The Sergeant had given clear and concise situation reports to Police control and clearly indicated his intention to contain the gunman. Sergeant Guthrie could see the gunman inside the house and became concerned that he might soon move as he had blackened his face and taken up a backpack. The Sergeant reported the gunman breaking windows and endeavouring to throw what appeared to be an incendiary device into the house. After spending some time moving about his property, the gunman moved towards a Constable's position. Sergeant Guthrie reported his concern that he had lost sight of the gunman and warned the Detective to advise staff to be on the alert. A Constable had now sighted the gunman approaching him and issued a challenge, the gunman retreated in haste passing to the rear of his property.

Due to lack of communication Sergeant Guthrie was unaware of this movement. Sergeant Guthrie had taken cover in sand dunes at the rear of a crib (seaside cottage) next to the gunman's house when suddenly out of the darkness he was confronted by the gunman. Sergeant Guthrie very courageously challenged him, saying Stop ... ...., stop or I shoot. The Sergeant then discharged a warning shot from his .38 calibre police revolver. The gunman then moved around and down upon the sergeant killing him instantly in a volley of shots. The gunman then took the Sergeant's revolver. Throughout this ordeal Sergeant Guthrie displayed conspicuous courage. His actions in placing himself in danger to protect his staff and members of the public at the cost of his own life were selfless acts of heroism. His bravery and courage were in the highest traditions of the New Zealand Police.

=== George Medal (GM) ===
- Eva Helen Dickson – of Aramoana.

Mrs Dickson was a resident at Aramoana when a man ran amok with a firearm on 13 November 1990. After hearing shots being fired, Mrs Dickson went to investigate and found smoke coming from a neighbour 's house . As Mrs Dickson endeavoured to prevent a man walking in the direction of the shooting, the gunman appeared and began firing shots. With two artificial hips and restricted arm movements through surgery Mrs Dickson, aged 72, was unable to run for cover and ushered the now wounded man to the roadside where they both fell to the ground. Mrs Dickson ascertained the man had been seriously wounded in the lower back and was unable to move. With a display of great courage and resource Mrs Dickson dragged herself to a nearby telephone booth where she urgently summoned an ambulance and Police. She then crawled approximately 100 metres back to the wounded man and comforted him. Concerned at the delay in medical aid Mrs Dickson then crawled to her home and made further emergency calls. The injured man was rescued by Police but later died of his wounds. Mrs Dickson continued a tense vigil communicating the gunman's nocturnal activities to Police by telephone throughout the night. Mrs Dickson's selfless and humane actions in staying with the wounded man in the face of grave danger and conveying situation reports to Police while alone at night with the constant fear of the gunman's appearance, are deserving of the highest praise.

=== Queen's Gallantry Medal (QGM) ===
- Victor James Crimp QSM – of Aramoana. Posthumous

Mr Crimp was a resident of the Aramoana village at the time a young man ran amok with a firearm on 13 November 1990. Attracted by a fire which the gunman had deliberately set alight, Mr Crimp with a friend went to alert Mr Magnus Jamieson of the danger. The gunman fired on both men as they attempted to gain entry to Mr Jamieson's house. The friend left, but Mr Crimp managed to gain entry to the house to warn Mr Jamieson. Mr Crimp was followed inside by the gunman who fatally shot both men in the living room. Mr Crimp's determined action in warning Mr Jamieson of the impending danger, at the cost of his own life, was an exemplary act of bravery.

- Don Nicholas Fraser Harvey – constable, New Zealand Police.
- Paul Alan Knox – detective, New Zealand Police.

Constable Harvey, was a member of the Dunedin Armed Offenders Squad deployed at Aramoana on 13–14 November 1990.

With another Constable he maintained a cordon at the front of the gunman's house. Sergeant Guthrie was positioned at the rear of the house in which it was believed the gunman was contained. On learning the gunman was not within the thin Police cordon, he and the other constable set out in search of the gunman. Constable Harvey heard a verbal challenge to the gunman and made toward the direction of the voice. They were without radio communication and their every movement was fraught with danger. Constable Harvey gained a fleeting view of the gunman as he walked over a higher piece of ground. The gunman fired a volley of shots at an unknown target. His possession of a .38 calibre police revolver indicated to Constable Harvey that a member of the Police had been incapacitated. Detective Knox was one of the initial group of Police to respond to the incident at Aramoana. Because of the lack of portable communication Sergeant Guthrie first deployed Detective Knox as a physical communicator between another Constable and himself. Detective Knox moved variously between the Constable and a Police vehicle relaying the sergeant's orders. Detective Knox was then deployed to a cordon position near the gunman's house. The Detective observed the gunman outside the house carrying a burning object in one hand. Detective Knox returned to the Police vehicle and relayed his observation to Sergeant Guthrie. During the sergeant's return radio transmission Detective Knox heard the sergeant call out a challenge. There was an immediate volley of shots. Detective Knox realised Sergeant Guthrie's perilous position, and without regard for his own personal safety, called out to the sergeant. As the sergeant did not reply Detective Knox bravely moved across open ground to his last known position.

After locating the slain Sergeant Guthrie and radioing the shooting of the sergeant to control, Detective Knox joined Constable Harvey. Believing the gunman might have further weapons in his house, and despite not knowing his exact whereabouts, the two policemen approached, entered and searched his premises. The gunman had decamped but the search revealed three high-powered firearms and a quantity of ammunition. Constable Harvey seized the weapons and removed them from the premises. Still without portable radio communication, Constable Harvey and Detective Knox decided to make for safer ground. During this movement the two policemen passed a parked utility vehicle where a number of bodies lay. Again, Constables Harvey and Knox exposed themselves to extreme danger while checking the vehicle and condition of the gunman's victims. Finding one of six people alive, the two policemen decided to instigate an evacuation. Constable Harvey exposed himself to further danger by returning to a Police vehicle to meet with the arriving Armed Offenders Squad and to arrange the evacuation. Detective Knox remained with a wounded girl for nearly 40 minutes before she was evacuated in a daring rescue. Constable Harvey and Detective Knox, in difficult and dangerous conditions, displayed exemplary acts of bravery in the highest traditions of the New Zealand Police.

- Terry Edward Van Turnhout – constable, New Zealand Police.
- David Thomas Weir – senior constable, New Zealand Police.

Constables Van Turnhout and Weir, members of the Dunedin Armed Offender Squad were deployed in the Aramoana village on the evening of 13 November 1990. Constables Van Turnhout and Weir volunteered to recover two victims although the whereabouts of the gunman was unknown. They proceeded in a Police dog van into an open intersection to effect the recovery of a wounded man, knowing that they had virtually no protection from gunfire. Constable Weir positioned the van to allow Constable Van Turnhout to drag the wounded man into the passenger's side of the vehicle. Constable Weir then reversed the vehicle at speed to a waiting ambulance. The victim later died. The second victim, a child, was being protected by Detective Knox near a utility van. This necessitated a further recovery attempt and again Constables Van Turnhout and Weir volunteered. They drove to the utility van and recovered two children, Detective Knox, Constable Harvey and two other persons. One of the children was dead and the other, although seriously wounded, survived the ordeal. Both recovery operations were exemplary acts of bravery in the highest traditions of the New Zealand Police.

=== Queen's Commendation for Brave Conduct ===
- Michael Arthur Kyne – sergeant, New Zealand Police
- Timothy Philip Ashton – constable, New Zealand Police
- Robert William Barlass – constable, New Zealand Police
- Peter Gerard McCarthy – constable, New Zealand Police

On 13 November 1990 at Aramoana, a young man ran amok with a firearm and massacred thirteen people before being fatally shot by Police the next day. Sergeant Kyne was the leader, and Constables Ashton, Barlass and McCarthy, members, of an Anti Terrorist Squad deployed in the Aramoana village.

Sergeant Kyne led his team on a painstaking and methodical search of the nine houses in the village, in an endeavour to apprehend the gunman. In the course of the operation the gunman fired indiscriminate semi-automatic gunfire at Sergeant Kyne and his team. Constables Barlass and McCarthy attempted to lob tear gas grenades into the house amid heavy fire from the gunman. Without warning the gunman burst from the residence firing indiscriminately from the hip at Constables Ashton and McCarthy and others, calling for the Police to shoot him. Constable McCarthy appealed in vain for the gunman to drop his weapon, and simultaneously the gunman was hit and felled by return Police fire.

Sergeant Kyne and his team placed themselves in a situation of extreme danger in order to apprehend the gunman. Their conduct was in the best traditions of the New Zealand Police.

- Chiquita Danielle Holden.

Miss Chiquita Holden, aged 9, resided with her father at Aramoana. At the time the gunman started firing shots, on 13 November 1990, Chiquita was visiting friends. She heard shouting and saw her father go to a neighbour's house. A further argument was followed by shooting and Chiquita learned her father had been shot. Almost immediately the gunman, a neighbour, entered the house she was in and shot her with a rifle. After receiving a gunshot wound to her stomach and leg, and on her own initiative, she then ran from the house to obtain help and warn the neighbours, at the same time warning two young boys of the situation. Chiquita was driven back to the address where she found the house on fire, and was again shot at. Chiquita showed remarkable presence of mind, stamina and determined courage.

== In relation to other events ==
=== George Medal (GM) ===
- Royd Philip Kennedy – senior fire fighter, No. 1A01 District (Auckland), New Zealand Fire Service.

On the evening of Thursday 9 August 1990 a petrol tanker towing a trailer unit collided with a motor vehicle adjacent to a shopping centre at Wiri Station Road, Manukau City. On impact, the trailer unit overturned and a rapidly increasing and intense fire occurred from the large amount of blazing petrol that was escaping. There was a risk of a major conflagration and explosion.

Senior Fire Fighter Kennedy was with the first fire appliance crew to arrive at the scene and while carrying out initial duties he heard a scream and saw a hand moving from under the overturned trailer. He realised that a person was trapped under the trailer. He immediately went to the assistance of the trapped person, a young girl, and crawled under the trailer to be next to her. Although there was little he personally could do on his own to extricate the girl, he remained with her while other personnel provided protective water sprays onto him and the girl and positioned the necessary equipment to raise the overturned trailer to free the seriously injured girl.

Throughout the ordeal, Senior Fire Fighter Kennedy was himself in an extremely dangerous position, and the risking of his own life to preserve other life reflects the highest ideals and traditions of the New Zealand Fire Service. His presence played a large part in maintaining the confidence of the seriously injured girl, and in her being rescued alive, which from the outset was not a foregone conclusion.

- Peter Morris Umbers – senior constable, New Zealand Police. Posthumous

In the early hours of Sunday 27 May 1990 there was an armed robbery at the Poolburn Hotel, Central Otago . As a result police throughout Central Otago were called out. Senior Constable Umbers, stationed at Ranfurly, was directed to go to the intersection of State Highway 85 and the Ida Valley Road. On route to this point and about five kilometres out of Ranfurly, he sighted a vehicle coming from the direction of Poolburn. Constable Umbers was alone and he took the decision that he should stop and check the motor vehicle. He was aware that the offender was armed and that any vehicle he stopped could well be that of the offender. The first vehicle he stopped contained innocent people. Almost immediately after allowing this vehicle to proceed, he stopped a second vehicle which contained the offender. By radio he informed his superiors and other police of the action he was taking. He also advised details of the vehicle, its registration number and the number of occupants. He then failed to respond to any further calls. It was subsequently established that the offender, who was known to Constable Umbers, on alighting from the vehicle was requested to place his hands on the bonnet of the Police car. Constable Umbers then proceeded to search the offender's car and it was while he was doing this that the offender started to argue and then attacked Constable Umbers, kicking him in the head. During the ensuing struggle the Constable's baton was wrestled off him and then used to violently beat him about the head, causing injuries that proved fatal. Constable Umbers acted in the highest traditions of the New Zealand Police.

=== Queen's Gallantry Medal (QGM) ===
- Sergeant John Akurangi – Royal New Zealand Infantry Regiment.

On 2 August 1988 Sergeant Akurangi was supervising a live grenade throwing practice for Territorial Force Recruits at Waiouru.

A recruit and Sergeant Akurangi were standing side by side in a grenade throwing bay preparing to throw the first of two M67 high explosive fragmentation grenades. The recruit, in the process of removing the safety bail from the grenade, accidentally loosened his grip which allowed the safety lever to be released thereby arming the grenade. This type of grenade has a lethal radius of eight metres and remains extremely dangerous out to 15 metres. Once armed it explodes in approximately four seconds. The recruit froze, holding the armed grenade. Sergeant Akurangi, immediately realizing the danger, calmly asked for the grenade. When the recruit failed to respond, Sergeant Akurangi forcibly removed the grenade from the recruit's hand and threw it out of the bay. He pushed the recruit to the ground and by calling "grenade" ensured that personnel in the adjourning bay were able to react appropriately.

The grenade exploded in the air at very close range to Sergeant Akurangi's throwing bay and within a second of being thrown. His alertness, speed of reaction and presence of mind certainly saved both the recruit's and his own life. His professional sense of responsibility to the recruit testifies to his selfless bravery.

- Warrant Officer Class Two Kevin Charles Friis – Royal New Zealand Infantry Regiment (Regular Force) (Retired).

On 13 February 1987, Warrant Officer Friis was conducting a live grenade throwing exercise for Territorial Force soldiers at W aiouru.

A Territorial Force soldier with Warrant Officer Friis, his instructor, were side by side when an armed M67 high explosive fragmentation grenade thrown by the soldier accidentally landed inside the safe throwing bay within three metres of their position. The grenade, which has a lethal radius of eight metres and remains extremely dangerous out to 15 metres, was set to explode four seconds after leaving the soldier's hand. Warrant Officer Friis without hesitation lifted the soldier from the ground and attempted to drag him to safety. The soldier, now incoherent, slipped from Warrant Officer Friis' grasp after three metres and did not act further to save himself. Warrant Officer Friis again picked up the soldier and carried him to partial cover nine metres from the grenade where, throwing the soldier to the ground, he covered him with his own still partly exposed body as the grenade exploded.

Warrant Officer Friis' professional sense of responsibility and brave actions undoubtedly saved the life of the soldier.

- Peter Wallace Sutton.

On the afternoon of 23 August 1988, Mr Sutton and his family were travelling south on State Highway 4. At Owhango they came upon a Traffic Officer who was lying on the ground near his patrol vehicle, being severely assaulted by a man.

Mr Sutton stopped his vehicle and went to the Traffic Officer's assistance only to be confronted by a second man pointing a pistol at him and the Traffic Officer. The gunman fired two shots at them, the second striking Mr Sutton in the leg. A third shot lodged in the side of Mr Sutton's vehicle containing his family. The gunman and his companion then promptly left the scene in their vehicle.

Mr Sutton, without thought for himself, displayed exemplary courage in going to the assistance of the Traffic Officer and almost certainly helped save his life.

- James Lindsay Thomas – traffic officer, Traffic Safety Service, Ministry of Transport.

On the evening of 7 January 1990 Traffic Officer Thomas, accompanied by a Senior Traffic Sergeant, was on duty in a patrol vehicle at Kimbell, South Canterbury. Traffic Officer Thomas had reason to stop the driver of a motor vehicle, which unknown to both officers had recently been stolen and the driver armed. It was only after Traffic Officer Thomas had left the patrol vehicle that he became aware of the other driver aiming a .303 rifle at him. From where he was standing Traffic Officer Thomas could see that the rifle bolt was not quite pushed home and he took the opportunity to try and reason with the driver and perhaps disarm him. The armed man however, became agitated and moved out of range of the headlights into the darkness making further approaches to him difficult.

At this point Traffic Officer Thomas and the Senior Traffic Sergeant decided to get away from the area. As the patrol car was moving away a shot was fired by the offender, which narrowly missed Traffic Officer Thomas and hit the other officer. A second shot through the rear window again hit the Senior Sergeant in the head. Traffic Officer Thomas travelled a short distance whereupon he stopped to assess his colleague's needs, and radio for medical assistance. He then proceeded to Fairlie where an ambulance and medical help was waiting to assist the Senior Sergeant who suffered horrific facial injuries. The offender was later apprehended by the New Zealand Police.

Traffic Officer Thomas, in dealing with a dangerous situation, displayed exemplary courage and his prompt actions saved the life of his fellow officer.

=== Queen's Commendation for Brave Conduct ===
- James Rangi Samuel Toheroa Robinson – custody manager, New Zealand Prison Service, Department of Justice, Christchurch.

For services on 1 May 1987, when at the Christchurch Women's Prison, he apprehended and disarmed an intruder who was inside the perimeter boundary fence area. The intruder had previously fired shots at lights around the institution. His prompt action in a dangerous situation enabled the security to be maintained and the safety of inmates and other staff.

- Squadron Leader Stephen Geoffrey Bone – Royal New Zealand Air Force.
- Flight Sergeant Ross Stephen Paterson – Royal New Zealand Air Force.

On 11 June 1987 during a military exercise between New Zealand and the Malaysian forces, a fuel pump on the deck of a Malaysian Army truck caught fire. A Malaysian Army driver drove the burning vehicle away from several helicopters about to be refuelled. The furiously blazing fuel pump and its petrol tank still intact fell from the truck and landed between two RNZAF Iroquois helicopters. Realising the imminent danger to onlookers (mainly children) and aircraft, Squadron Leader Bone assisted by Flight Sergeant Paterson, took extinguishers from their aircraft and ran to the fuel pump and extinguished the fire. Their prompt action in a most dangerous situation undoubtedly prevented loss of life and probable damage to two aircraft.

- Lee Frances Vogel.

On the morning of 17 July 1987, Mrs Vogel was acting as a parent volunteer supervisor of a school patrol crossing in Blighs Road, Christchurch City, for the Waimairi Primary School. The patrol was operating, with signs extended requiring drivers to stop, and four children were crossing the road, when it became clear to Mrs Vogel that an approaching car was unlikely to stop. She went onto the crossing in an attempt to wave down the car and/or pull the children from the path of the approaching vehicle. Despite her efforts the vehicle did not stop. It struck three of the children and Mrs Vogel. All four were seriously injured. Mrs Vogel in particular suffered head and leg injuries and a crushed vertebra. Of the children injured, one suffered a dislocated hip and another a cut to the forehead requiring stitches.

- Alan Brian Lawry – corporal, Royal New Zealand Corps of Transport (Retired).

On 27 November 1987, Corporal Lawry went to the assistance of 10 people involved in an accident between a motorcycle and a van on State Highway 1, north of Taihape. As the first person to arrive at the scene, he found the motorcycle's petrol tank had, on impact separated, and was on fire near the van's petrol tank. On finding the motorcycle pillion passenger under the van with her clothes on fire, he beat out the flames with his gloved hands and removed her to safety. He then went to the rear of the van and removed eight passengers, including six children, to safety. One woman was in shock and remained trapped in the van. Corporal Lawry sat with her inside the van, now burning, until firemen arrived and removed the seat to permit the woman's escape.

- Paul David Garrett – traffic sergeant, Traffic Safety Service, Ministry of Transport

For services in the early hours of the morning of 11 January 1988 when, at considerable risk to his own safety, he was instrumental in preventing a woman from jumping off the Auckland Harbour Bridge. He leant over the safety rail, and gripping it with his knees, grabbed the woman under her arms and then, assisted by Police, pulled her to safety.

- Kevin Barry Reid.

On 6 July 1988, Mr Reid, a sharemilker, went to the assistance of a man trapped in his motor vehicle and suffering from concussion and cuts to his head and unable to free himself from the seatbelt. The vehicle's engine was on fire and flames had begun to pierce through the dashboard. Mr Reid cut the seatbelt with his bloat knife and dragged the injured driver through the broken windscreen just before the vehicle was engulfed in flames.

- Ian David Harrison – traffic officer, Traffic Safety Service, Ministry of Transport

On the afternoon of 23 August 1988, Traffic Officer Ian Harrison stopped the driver of a motor vehicle for speeding on State Highway 4 at Owhango. He asked the driver back to his patrol vehicle in order to issue a Traffic Offence Notice. He also suspected the driver to be under the influence of alcohol so he carried out a breath screening test. At this point a passenger of the offender's vehicle approached the patrol car in what appeared to be a menacing manner. Realising that the situation was becoming ominous, Traffic Officer Harrison radioed for help. At this stage the person he was processing assaulted him. The passenger then became involved by restraining Traffic Officer Harrison around the neck with the radio telephone cord which had been torn from its mounting. Following several further blows to Traffic Officer Harrison the two men decided that the passenger would take Traffic Officer Harrison hostage in the patrol car and travel south with Traffic Officer Harrison driving, while the other man would lead in his vehicle. Traffic Officer Harrison while still restrained tightly around the neck by the radio cord, began a U-turn in order to follow the other vehicle. He had already unlocked his car door and while executing the U-turn he opened the door and rolled out of the car onto the road. Traffic Officer Harrison's captor jumped out of the car after him and severely assaulted him. At this point Mr Peter Sutton, who was travelling south with his family, came upon the scene. He stopped and went to Traffic Officer Harrison's assistance only to be confronted by the original offender pointing a pistol at both of them. The gunman fired two shots, the second hitting Mr Sutton in the leg. A third shot lodged in the side of Mr Sutton's vehicle containing his family. The gunman and his companion promptly left the scene in their vehicle.

- Peter Bruce Waring-Taylor Clarke – sergeant, New Zealand Police.

For services at Murupara on 10 May 1989 when, faced by an armed and dangerous offender, who was being sought by the Police, he displayed courage and initiative in managing to overpower and finally arrest the man, in the course of which both barrels of a sawn-off shotgun were discharged very close to him.

- Scott Allan Barclay – gunner, Royal Regiment of New Zealand Artillery.

On 8 February 1990 a group of nine soldiers were caught in a rip while swimming at Karioitahi Beach, Auckland. Gunner Barclay managed to rescue one soldier and although close to exhaustion, commandeered a surf board and re-entered the surf and rescued a second soldier. His total disregard for his own safety almost certainly saved the two soldiers from drowning.

- Murray John Whitmore – sergeant, New Zealand Police.

On 7 May 1990 a 16 year old youth appeared before Judge Augusta Wallace in the Otahuhu Youth Court on four various charges. The Judge remanded the accused into Social Welfare custody and then addressed some comments to him. The youth took exception to these comments and then without warning produced a machete, moved towards the Judge, raised it above his head and brought it down on the right-hand side of the Judge's head, inflicting horrific injuries. Sergeant Whitmore, the Police prosecutor, was seated at the back of the court room and upon seeing what was taking place moved forward to restrain the youth. He could not prevent the first blow being struck but managed, with assistance, to prevent a further attack. Sergeant Whitmore then took control of the situation and rendered first aid to the Judge. His prompt and brave actions almost certainly saved the Judge's life.

- Owen Haslam Woods – assistant commander, No 1AO1 District (Auckland), New Zealand Fire Service.
- Raymond Warby – divisional officer, No 1AO1 District (Auckland), New Zealand Fire Service.

On the evening of Thursday 9 August 1990 a petrol tanker towing a trailer unit collided with a motor vehicle adjacent to a shopping centre at Wiri Station Road, Manukau City. On impact, the trailer unit overturned and a rapidly increasing and intense fire occurred from the large amount of blazing petrol that was escaping. There was a risk of a major conflagration and explosion. A young girl was discovered trapped under the overturned trailer.

Divisional Officer Warby arranged for protective sprays to be directed on the area in which the girl was trapped and being comforted by a fellow fire Fighter. He crawled in under the trailer to ascertain what additional assistance he could provide. He then proceeded to move round under the tanker and trailer for periods over an hour coordinating the work of raising the vehicle to allow rescue. Assistant Commander Woods was also involved in the efforts to extricate the girl. He not only had to control the New Zealand Fire Service resources in protecting the casualty and a fellow Fire Fighter comforting the girl but also had to organise the personnel and materials to effect a rapid and safe rescue.

The skill and devotion to duty of both officers in placing themselves in positions of great danger reflects the highest ideals and traditions of the New Zealand Fire Service.

- Kevin Bruce Anderson – traffic officer, Traffic Safety Service, Ministry of Transport

On 12 August 1990 Traffic Officer Anderson, disregarding his own safety and in bitterly cold, wet and dangerous conditions, clambered down with the aid of a rope, the slippery face of the Forest View Waterfalls in the Mangamuku Gorge to rescue an English tourist. He found the man in a deep pool, about 30 feet below, but the man had apparently died from his injuries. He then assisted with the recovery of the body. The tourist had fallen over the edge of the waterfalls while filming.

- Brent Thorpe.

On the afternoon of 27 October 1990, Mr Thorpe was an eyewitness at the scene of a collision between three vehicles on State Highway 2. One of the vehicles exploded into flames after being hit from behind and was forced into the path of another vehicle. Disregarding his personal safety he rushed to the burning vehicle and pulled the unconscious driver to safety, then returned and assisted another occupant to escape the wreckage. His prompt actions without doubt saved the life of the driver of the vehicle.
