= William Kircher =

New Zealand actor

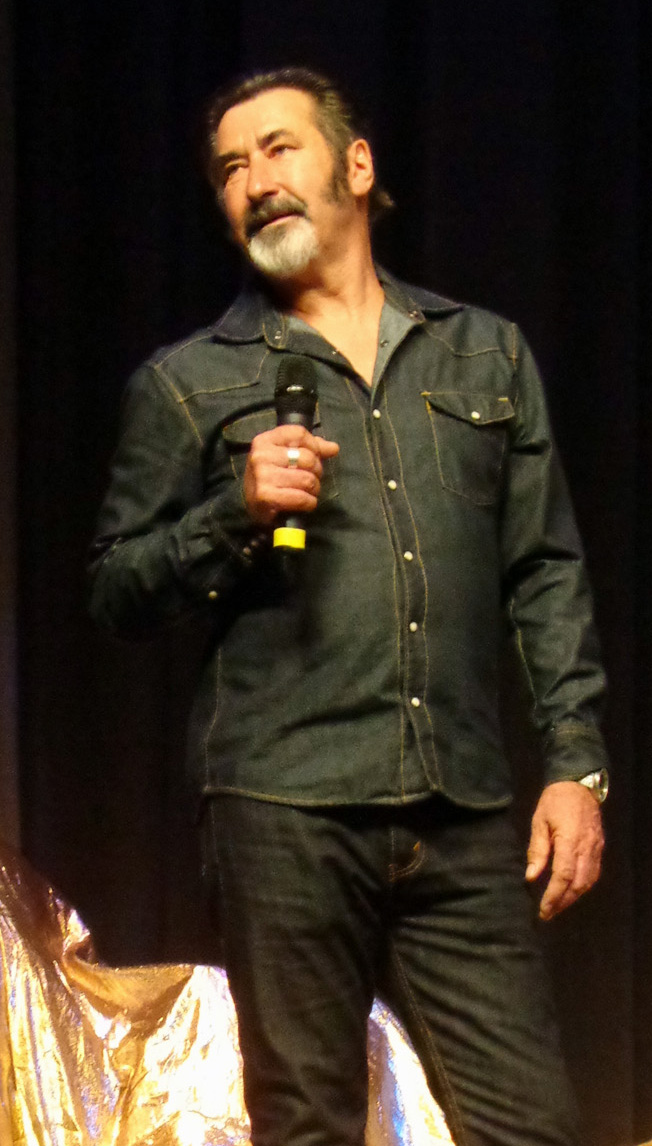
- Kircher on 5 April 2015 at the Hobbitcon III convention in Bonn, Germany
- Born: 23 May 1958 (age 67); New Zealand
- Years active: 1983–present

William Kircher (born 23 May 1958) is a New Zealand actor. William Kircher first came to prominence in New Zealand television in the police drama series Shark in the Park.

== Life and career ==
Kircher is married to Nicole Chesterman Kircher and they have four daughters.

Kircher lied about his age when applying to Toi Whakaari, the New Zealand Drama School, so he was only 18 when he graduated two years later. He graduated with a Diploma in Acting in 1976.

In the late 1990s, Kircher shifted his focus away from acting toward production, singing, and executive management. In 2003, he went into partnership to form ScreenAdventures, a movie company. He returned to acting in 2006 in the film Out of the Blue which was based on the true story of the Aramoana massacre. Kircher appeared in the film adaptations of The Hobbit as the dwarf Bifur.

In 2018 he directed Steven Dietz's play Trust in North Hollywood with Zachary Cowan, Caroline Henry, Elizabeth Izzo, Paul McGee, Caroline Simone O’Brien and Heidi Rhodes.

== Filmography ==
=== Television ===
Years	Television series	Role	Notes
1983	The Kids from OWL	Kane	
1984	Heroes	Diner	Episode: 1.01
1986	Cuckoo Land	Crocodile Crosby / Trev / Cyril Rancid / Police Officer	4 episodes
1987, 1989	Worzel Gummidge Down Under	Stallholder; Farmer; Scarecrow	3 episodes
1989	The Ray Bradbury Theater	Ned Bantlin	Episode: "A Miracle of Rare Device"
1989–1991	Shark in the Park	BP	28 episodes
1995	Fallout	Richard Harman	TV miniseries
1995	Plainclothes	Gary Halloway	Episode: 1.16
1996	The Enid Blyton Adventure Series	Tel	Episode: "Valley of Adventure"
1996	Oscar and Friends	Referee	
1998	The Enid Blyton Secret Series	Uncle Joe	Episode: "The Secret of Moon Castle"
1998	City Life	Ross Palmer	8 episodes
1998	The Legend of William Tell	Quint	Episode: "Master of Doubt"
1998	Xena: Warrior Princess	Captain	Episode: "Locked Up and Tied Down"
1999	A Twist in the Tale	Mr. Anton	Episode: "Bertie"
2006	Legend of the Seeker	The Merchant	Episode: "Broken"

=== Films ===
Year	Film	Role	Notes
1984	Trespasses	Constable	
1984	Constance	Police officer	
1985	Hot Target	Pearson	
1988	Send a Gorilla	Ned	
1991	Gold: A Fistful of Gold	Pyke	TV movie
1992	Absent Without Leave	Sergeant Major	
1994	The Last Tattoo	Gibbon	
1994	Bread & Roses	Sid Holland	
1996	Return to Treasure Island	Pearce	TV movie
2006	Out of the Blue	Sergeant Stu Guthrie	
2008	Wildfire / Hold-Up	Construction worker	
2008	Aftershock	Rupert Stalker	TV movie
2012	The Hobbit: An Unexpected Journey	Bifur; Tom	
2013	The Hobbit: The Desolation of Smaug	Bifur	
2014	The Hobbit: The Battle of the Five Armies	Bifur	
