= Out of the Blue (2006 film) =

- New Zealand theatrical release poster
- Directed by: Robert Sarkies
- Written by: Graeme Tetley; Robert Sarkies; Bill O'Brien
- Produced by: Steven O'Meagher; Timothy White
- Starring: Karl Urban; Matthew Sunderland; Lois Lawn; Simon Ferry; Tandi Wright; Paul Glover; William Kircher; Georgia Fabish; Fayth Rasmussen
- Cinematography: Greig Fraser
- Edited by: Annie Collins
- Music by: Victoria Kelly
- Production companies: Desert Road Films; Southern Light Films
- Distributed by: Dendy Films
- Release dates: 11 September 2006 (Toronto); 12 October 2006 (New Zealand)
- Running time: 103 minutes
- Country: New Zealand
- Language: English
- Budget: NZ$6 million
- Box office: US$728 (US) NZ$1,135,700 (NZ)

Out of the Blue is a 2006 New Zealand crime drama film directed by Robert Sarkies and starring Karl Urban, based on the 1990 Aramoana massacre, that occurred over a period of two days in the small coastal community of Aramoana in Otago, New Zealand. This was the deadliest mass shooting in New Zealand at the time, prior to the Christchurch mosque shootings in 2019.

The film premiered at the Toronto International Film Festival on 11 September 2006 in Canada and was released in New Zealand on 12 October 2006. It grossed over $1 million at the New Zealand box-office, taking it into the top ten highest grossing local films.

== Plot ==
On 13 November 1990, David Gray, an unemployed man in his 30s lives in his parents' small holiday home in Aramoana. He cycles into town where he has an argument with staff at a bank over a minor issue. Unstable and angry, he returns home where he has a cache of fire-arms. Late in the afternoon, he notices children from a neighbouring house have wandered onto his yard and he angrily abuses them, sparking a heated verbal exchange with their father, Garry Holden. Gray goes inside his house and then quickly re-emerges armed with the rifle, shooting Holden dead. Holden's two young daughters, Chiquita and Jasmine, and his girlfriend Julie-Anne's adopted daughter Rewa, witness the murder and flee inside Holden's house, attempting to hide. Gray enters and soon locates them.

Chiquita is then seen fleeing, having been wounded, trying to get help for Jasmine and Rewa (whose deaths occur off-screen). She reaches Julie-Anne and they both get into her van and drive towards the scene, trying to rescue the other girls, only to find Holden's house has been set on fire. Julie-Anne is then forced to drive to safety as Gray fires at her vehicle.

Nearby residents hear the shooting and see the smoke, not yet comprehending what is happening. Gray enters a nearby house and shoots dead both male occupants. Elderly widow Eva Dickson, who recently has had hip surgery, ventures out with her walking frame to see what is happening and she is joined by a neighbour Chris Cole. Earlier, Dickson's middle-aged son James had left the house, looking for his dog. An unseen Gray opens fire, hitting Cole and narrowly missing Dickson. Having collapsed and unable to stand up again, Dickson crawls inside her house to ring the police and then goes back to Cole, lying badly wounded but still conscious, to tell him that help is coming (Cole later succumbs to his injuries). A utility with six people on board, including three children, drives up from the nearby beach, stopping near the burning house. Gray emerges and opens fire. The subsequent shootings are not shown, only the noise and the look of horror on the face of a nearby witness.

The first police to arrive are Sgt Stewart Guthrie, Constable Nick Harvey, Detective Paul Knox and Constable Russell Anderson who had arrived with the fire brigade and borrows a rifle from a nearby resident. They arrive at Gray's and Holden's houses, seeing bodies in and around the utility, including a woman on the ground who is badly wounded and calling for help. The police attempt to surround Gray's house but the gunman surprises Guthrie from behind, shooting him dead. Harvey, armed with a rifle, briefly has Gray in his sights but hesitates, missing his chance.

Harvey reaches the utility, discovering the woman is now dead but one of the vehicle's other occupants still alive- 3-year-old Stacey Percy, who has been wounded in the abdomen but is still conscious. Knox and Harvey enter Gray's house but find it empty. They get into a car, Harvey nursing Stacey, trying to keep her conscious and Knox holding the bodies of the other two children from the utility, and drive to where a police cordon is being established, handing Stacey over to paramedics. Harvey is physically ill as he reacts to the fear and trauma.

Eva Dickson stays in her kitchen, keeping in touch with police by phone. Her dog comes back, stained with the blood of her son James (whose death has occurred off-screen). The police seal off the town, residents spending a fearful night in their homes with the gunman still at large. Gray enters a crib and, finding it deserted, spends the night there.

The next day, police have arrived en masse and are combing the town, searching for Gray. Armed Offenders Squad (AOS) officers locate the crib and surround the small house. After a brief exchange of gunfire, the officers throw tear-gas canisters into the house. Gray abruptly emerges, screaming obscenities and firing wildly from the hip. The waiting officers open fire and hit Gray several times, the gunman collapsing. With difficulty, the AOS men restrain him and then wait nearby as Gray dies of his wounds.

A postscript follows, consisting of a montage of scenes, including the full squad of AOS officers escorting Eva Dickson from her home as a mark of respect for her bravery, Chiquita Holden and Stacey Percy in hospital, both recovering from their wounds, the deliberate torching of Gray's house that occurred several days after the massacre, a list of names of the 13 people who died on 13 November and Harvey is on the roof of his house doing some repair work and stares towards Aramoana, reflecting.

== Cast ==
- Karl Urban as Nick Harvey
- Matthew Sunderland as David Gray
- Lois Lawn as Eva Helen Dickson
- Timothy Bartlett as James 'Jimmy' Dickson
- Simon Ferry as Garry Holden
- Tandi Wright as Julie-Anne Bryson
- Paul Glover as Paul Knox
- William Kircher as Sergeant Stu Guthrie
- Georgia Fabish as Chiquita Holden
- Fayth Rasmussen as Stacey Percy

== Production ==
Out of the Blue was written by Robert Sarkies and Graeme Tetley, and co-produced by Steven O'Meagher and Timothy White. The production companies were Desert Road Films and Southern Light Films.

It was edited by Annie Collins. The film score was composed by New Zealand composer Victoria Kelly, and cinematography was by Greig Fraser.

Production of the film faced a lot of opposition from the town, and as a result no filming was done in Aramoana. Some members of the community were against the movie being filmed, but they would get to see the movie first before it was released to the public, and it would not be called Aramoana. Most of the filming was shot in Long Beach, a settlement six kilometres from Aramoana.

== Release ==
The film had its world premiere at the Toronto International Film Festival on 11 September 2006 in Canada, and was released in New Zealand on 12 October 2006.

== Reception ==
The film received generally positive reviews. On the review aggregator website Rotten Tomatoes, 84% of 25 critics' reviews are positive, with an average rating of 7/10. The website's consensus reads: "A dramatization of real-life terror that's rendered all the more powerful through its sensitivity, Out of the Blue succeeds as a gripping drama as well as a moving commemoration." Metacritic, which uses a weighted average, assigned the film a score of 70 out of 100, based on 7 critics, indicating "generally favorable" reviews.

The film grossed over $1 million at the New Zealand box-office, taking it into the top ten highest grossing local films. It grossed US$728 in the US and NZ$1,135,700 in New Zealand.

The Office of Film and Literature Classification classified the film as R15 (restricted to viewers under 15 years of age) with the descriptive note "violence and content that may disturb". The film was restricted because the murders it depicts are likely to cause younger viewers distress and threaten their sense of personal safety. "Out of the Blue deals with recent events involving real people. For that reason we consulted with the families of victims and the Aramoana community. We were impressed by the articulate and heartfelt comments they made at our meetings" said Chief Censor Bill Hastings.

One of the AOS officers who located and shot Gray, Mike Kyne, took exception to the way they were portrayed in the film as standing to one side and smoking cigarettes whilst a hand-cuffed Gray lay on the ground, dying of his injuries. In reality, none of the AOS officers had smoked at the scene; Kyne pointed out that to have done so would have been highly unprofessional. After restraining Gray, they had called an ambulance. (Unlike the scene in the film, Gray did not die outside the crib but later in the ambulance en route to hospital.) Also, in the exchange of gunfire prior to Gray's capture, one of the AOS members was shot in the buttocks, which is not seen in the film.
