= List of New Zealand police officers killed in the line of duty =

This is a list of New Zealand Police officers and non-sworn staff killed in the line of duty. As of 2025, 34 police officers have been killed by criminal act, and about 17 have died from accidental causes, during the execution of duty. There has been one instance of multiple police deaths, when Stanley Graham gunned down four officers (and two wartime home guardsmen) attempting to apprehend him in 1941, and four double fatalities. Most of the homicides have been a result of gunshot wounds, the accidents mainly due to either drowning or vehicle (car/aircraft) accidents.

A slain officer may receive a police funeral, including an honour guard and flag-draped casket, and be officially mourned in the New Zealand House of Representatives. At least four officers have received posthumous honours—Sergeant Stewart Guthrie received the highest Commonwealth civilian decoration, the George Cross. The Lou Grant Award, created in the memory of the police sergeant who died in the 1993 Eagle helicopter mid-air collision, is awarded every second year for excellence and contributions to search and rescue.

The Memorial Wall at the Royal New Zealand Police College lists the names of fallen colleagues, whom the service commemorates annually on Police Remembrance Day. The Police Association together with the New Zealand Police introduced a Police Remembrance Day Pin in 2007, for officers to wear to honour the memory of those slain during the course of duty. The pin combines a Huia tail feather with a police chevron; the Huia bird was sacred in Māori culture, wearing of its feathers restricted to people of high status.

In addition to the human officers, 24 police dogs have died in the line of duty; notably the drowning of Enzo in 2007, Gage, a six-year-old German Shepherd, in 2010. In 2014, 4-year-old German Shepherd Gazza was shot and killed in Porirua.

== Officers ==
shaded rows denotes when officers were killed in the same incident.

=== Killed by criminal act ===
Since 1 September 1886.

QID (Query identity)	Rank	Name	Age	Honours	Date	Circumstance	Location	Notes
91	Constable	Neil McLeod	44		30 July 1890	Gumdigger Henry Funcke was removed from a steamer and had his rifle confiscated. He became angry and drew a concealed pistol, firing several shots at the departing ship, one of which struck McLeod in the chest.	Dargaville (Mangawhare Wharf)	
674	Sergeant	John Patrick Hackett McGuire	42		14 April 1910	Shot in the stomach during a manhunt, and died four days later. John Joseph Powelka was acquitted of murder but received 21 cumulative years for seven charges of burglary.	Palmerston North	
963	Constable	John Doyle	35		5 February 1913	Died in Palmerston North hospital four days after being assaulted by two men he was escorting out of the Albion Hotel. Peter MacDonald was charged with grievous bodily harm and sentenced to 18 months' imprisonment.	Shannon	
2030	Constable	Vivian Dudding	32		6 October 1919	Shot in the head while attending a domestic dispute where the divorced husband Alexander Aspin broke into his ex-wives house.	Thorndon, Wellington	
1764	Constable	James Dorgan	37		27 August 1921	Shot at point blank range while investigating a break-in at T & J Thomson’s Department Store, the killer was never found.	Timaru	
1582	Constable	Thomas Heeps	50		21 October 1934	Shot twice while attempting to apprehend Henare Hona, the subject of a manhunt after the brutal mass murder of the Davenport family. Heeps died in Waikato Hospital the next day.	Morrinsville (nearby)	
2209	Sergeant	William Cooper	43		8 October 1941	Shot by farmer Stanley Graham, who they were attempting to apprehend after he refused to surrender his firearm for the war effort. Grahman further shot dead two home guardsmen Richard Coulson and Gregory Hutchison. Graham was shot dead by police following at 12 day manhunt.	Hokitika (nearby)	
3526	Constable	Frederick William Jordan	26		8 October 1941	Shot by farmer Stanley Graham, who they were attempting to apprehend after he refused to surrender his firearm for the war effort. Grahman further shot dead two home guardsmen Richard Coulson and Gregory Hutchison. Graham was shot dead by police following at 12 day manhunt.	Hokitika (nearby)	
3039	Constable	Percy Campbell Tulloch	35		8 October 1941	Shot by farmer Stanley Graham, who they were attempting to apprehend after he refused to surrender his firearm for the war effort. Grahman further shot dead two home guardsmen Richard Coulson and Gregory Hutchison. Graham was shot dead by police following at 12 day manhunt.	Hokitika (nearby)	
2364	Constable	Edward Mark Best	42		8 October 1941	Shot by farmer Stanley Graham, who they were attempting to apprehend after he refused to surrender his firearm for the war effort. Grahman further shot dead two home guardsmen Richard Coulson and Gregory Hutchison. Graham was shot dead by police following at 12 day manhunt.	Hokitika (nearby)	
36	Traffic Officer	John Kehoe	24		31 January 1949	Shot several times by Richard Angus McGill, who he had stopped for speeding with his motorcycle. A farmer was also shot, but survived. John Kehoe was the first Traffic Officer to be killed in the line of duty.	Whakatāne	
2691	Sergeant	William Shore Hughes	48	Gold Merit Award	27 May 1951	Shot while investigating a call for help after Noema Raana Rika armed with a shotgun threatened a family firing multiple shots. Despite being shot in the arm Hughes wrestled for the shotgun, but another shot was fired and Hughes was killed. Mary Wehipeihana Te Hiwi and her daughters, Pearl and Victoria were also killed. Noema Raana Rika shot himself in the chest.	Ōtaki	
	Detective Inspector	Wallace Chalmers	46	QPM	6 January 1963	Shot dead by Victor George Wasmuth while attending a shooting. Wasmuth had already killed a neighbour and injured another man before police arrived. He was later declared insane.	Waitākere Ranges	
2839	Detective Sergeant	Neville Wilson Power	25	QPM	6 January 1963	Shot dead by Victor George Wasmuth while attending a shooting. Wasmuth had already killed a neighbour and injured another man before police arrived. He was later declared insane.	Waitākere Ranges	
4321	Constable	James Thomas Richardson	24		3 February 1963	Shot dead by Bruce Douglas McPhee who had been drinking and taking tranquillisers. The pair were sitting in their police car outside McPhee's address, after responding to investigate a domestic dispute.	Lower Hutt	
3809	Constable	Brian Leslie Schultz	21		3 February 1963	Shot dead by Bruce Douglas McPhee who had been drinking and taking tranquillisers. The pair were sitting in their police car outside McPhee's address, after responding to investigate a domestic dispute.	Lower Hutt	
4699	Constable	Donald Richard Stokes	23		15 August 1966	Set upon and beaten with a broom handle by escaping prisoners at Dunedin police station, Stokes died later in hospital. Both prisoners were sentenced to life imprisonment.	Dunedin	
2950	Sergeant	Gilbert Peter Arcus	44		4 February 1970	Assaulted by a mentally disturbed woman he was trying to placate, Arcus was pushed to the floor and struck his head on the ground, dying from the fatal skull fracture an hour later.	Tauranga	
5052	Constable	Peter William Murphy	21		25 September 1976	Shot by a teenage burglar while attending a break-in at sports retailer Smith & Rainsford Ltd. Around six shots were fired with one hitting Murphy in the head.	Invercargill	
1395	Traffic Officer	Barry Yorston Gibson	32		13 June 1977	Assaulted after stopping a car, Gibson's jaw was broken in two places and he was severely concussed, Gibson never regained consciousness and a week later he died in hospital.	New Plymouth	
1351	Traffic Officer	Robin Jamieson Dudding	44	GM	7 April 1986	Taken hostage after the driver of a truck he had waved down stepped out with a shotgun. Dudding was forced to drive to Rotorua, however Dudding instead drove to Lake Rotorua in what was likely an attempt to gain time. Dudding was shot after attempting to disarm the offender.	Lake Rotoiti, Bay of Plenty	
4601	Senior Constable	Peter Morris Umbers	35	GM	27 May 1990	Beaten to death with his own baton by Richard Thomas Lakich, who he had stopped after Lakich had fled a hotel bar robbery. Umbers' injuries were so severe it was first believed he had been shot.	Ranfurly (nearby)	
5024	Sergeant	Stewart Guthrie	41	GC	13 November 1990	Shot in the head after encountering David Gray at his house during the Aramoana massacre. Gurthrie challenged Gray and fired a warning shot as he left the house. Gray fired several times, striking Guthrie killing him instantly. Guthrie was the 13th and last person killed in the Aramoana massacre.	Aramoana	
D717	Constable	Glenn Arthur McKibben	25		21 April 1996	Shot while talking to a motorist and standing beside his police car in a random shooting by former soldier Terence Thompson. Thompson was shot dead by the Armed Offenders Squad following a 9 week manhunt.	Flaxmere, Hastings	
G083	Constable	Lester Murray Stretch	38		27 May 1999	Beaten to death by Carlos Namana who Stretch has chased following a theft at a local dairy. Outside the local hospital Namana resisted arrest and Stretch died at the scene from severe head injuries.	Mangakino	
F272	Detective Constable	Duncan Taylor	39	NZBM	5 July 2002	Shot by a teenager Daniel Luff after stopping him for violating a protection order. Luff exited his vehicle with a stolen high-powered rifle, he shot Taylor without warning. Taylor's partner, Detective Sergeant Jeanette Park was shot in the leg, but escaped. Park was awarded the New Zealand Bravery Star.	Rongotea, Manawatū	
G092	Sergeant	Derek Wootton	52		11 July 2008	Struck by a carjacked vehicle driven by Mongrel Mob member Andrew Popo who was wanted for serious assault and was actively fleeing police. Wootton was struck by the vehicle while laying road spikes on Dimock St.	Titahi Bay	
I417	Sergeant	Don Wilkinson	47		11 September 2008	Shot by a .22 air rifle while attempting to secretly fix a tracking device to a car. Wilkinson and his unnamed partner fled after being confronted by Iain Clegg and John Skinner, the two officers were chased and Wilkinson was cornered and at close range received several shots from a .22 air rifle, one fatally through the chest. Wilkinson's partner was shot multiple times but survived.	Māngere	
5766	Senior Constable	Leonard Snee	53		7 May 2009	Shot while leaving a cannabis search warrant by former territorial soldier Jan Molenaar. Senior Constables Bruce Miller, Grant Diver and a member of the public Lenny Holmwood were also shot. A 51 hour standoff ensued during which the offender shot an array of primarily high-powered rifles and shotguns at police and the public.14 people including 10 police officer, 1 paramedic and 3 member of the public received bravery awards following the shooting.	Napier	
MHIH84	Constable	Matthew Dennis Hunt	28	NZBD	19 June 2020	Shot dead after exiting his patrol car to help his partner Constable Dave Goldfinch who had been shot 4 four times by Eli Epiha while providing first aid to a member of the public who was struck when a vehicle driven by Epiha crashed. Hunt was shot four times including once in the back. When delivering the sentence the High Court said that Epiha had continued shooting even after Hunt had fallen to the ground. Epiha pleaded guilty to Hunt's murder.	Massey	
LFE773	Senior Sergeant	Lyn Fleming	62		1 January 2025	Struck by a vehicle driving at speed while conducting a foot patrol in the Nelson City Centre. The incident was described as unprovoked and senseless. Another officer was seriously injured and a further officer and two members of the public were injured, but are stable. Hayden Donald Jason Tasker has been found guilty of Flemings murder.	Nelson	

=== Killed by accident ===
Badge	Rank	Name	Age	Honours	Date	Circumstance	Location	Notes
	Constable	Fitzgerald			26 September 1851	Drowned when a boat making for the Lady Nugent capsized.	Lyttelton Harbour	
	Sergeant-Major	Edward John Garvey	30	Légion d'honneur	25 September 1863	Died in a snowstorm on his way to inspect mine diggings near Naseby.	Kakanui Range	
	Constable	John Duncan			28 May 1865	Drowned travelling in a punt to investigate a burglary.	Kaniere (nearby)	
	Constable	James Robinson			13 November 1891	Fell and struck head on iron bar at police station.	Westport	
	Constable	Denis Mahoney	c. 38		28 March 1914	Killed by an explosion, together with 7 other volunteers, while fighting a fire at the Benge and Pratt store.	Upper Hutt	
	Constable	A J Dillon	c. 32		18 January 1916	Drowned with nurse Regan who he was attempting to save.	West Coast	
	Constable	Adam George Begg	26		24 February 1926	Killed by a passing train while searching the Parnell Tunnel for an escaped prisoner.	Parnell, Auckland	
	Constable	James Shields			October 1933	Car was hit by the Rotorua Express at a railway crossing.	Huntly (nearby)	
	Constable	Charles Williams			August 1935	Drowned attempting to save a woman who fell from the Hamilton Railway Bridge.	Waikato River	
	Constable	W J Watt			10 August 1939	Car went off Elephant Hill bridge, returning to a shooting investigation, Constable Black seriously injured.	Waimate (nearby)	
191	Constable	Cecil Edgar Orr	38		24 February 1942	Struck and killed by a train while searching for property along the railway tracks.	Parnell	
	Constable	Alan Robert Liddell	22		26 February 1976	Drowned while conducting an investigation with two colleagues, into a drowning on the river 17 days earlier.	Grey River	
	Constable	Greg Rowe	23		1 April 1978	Drowned after leg became entangled in a rope and fell overboard from Lady Elizabeth II.	Palliser Bay (nearby)	
	Senior Sergeant	Phillip William "Phil" Ward	39		2 July 1986	Drowned when police launch Lady Elizabeth II capsized during a storm, two other officers rescued by Peter Button.	Wellington Harbour	
	Constable	Glenn Andrews Hughes	28		2 July 1986	Drowned when police launch Lady Elizabeth II capsized during a storm, two other officers rescued by Peter Button.	Wellington Harbour	
	Detective	Anthony Raymond "Tony" Harrod	43		17 December 1990	Fell from helicopter sling during cannabis recovery operation.	Waitotara Valley, Taranaki	
	Sergeant	Lindsay Eion "Lou" Grant	39		26 November 1993	Police helicopter Eagle collided mid-air with a Piper Archer traffic spotting aircraft. Two civilians also died.	Auckland CBD	
	Constable	Alastair Alan Sampson	27		26 November 1993	Police helicopter Eagle collided mid-air with a Piper Archer traffic spotting aircraft. Two civilians also died.	Auckland CBD	
	Senior Constable	Phillip Anthony "Piripi" Wipatene	55		15 July 2004	Patrol car collided with another car on the Oakura Bridge.	New Plymouth (14 km southwest)	
	Detective	Travis Hughes	37		29 January 2005	Cessna 172 aircraft crashed while on cannabis reconnaissance, civilian pilot also died.	Gibbston Valley, Central Otago	
	Police Employee	Pamela (Pam) Brien	54		22 February 2011	Killed in the February 2011 Christchurch earthquake. Pamela Brien was at a work-related meeting related to her job in the child protection unit of the Christchurch detachment when the earthquake hit, resulting in the CTV Building she was in collapsing.	Christchurch	

== See also ==
- List of British police officers killed in the line of duty
- List of Gardaí killed in the line of duty
- List of Malaysian police officers killed in the line of duty
- List of Singapore police officers killed in the line of duty
- List of law enforcement officers killed in the line of duty in the United States
- List of People's Armed Police personnel killed in the line of duty
- Additionally, Category:Police officers killed in the line of duty lists individual articles.
