= Neil McLeod =

Neil McLeod or Neil Macleod may refer to:

- Neil McLeod (politician) (1842–1915), Prince Edward Island lawyer, judge and politician
- Neil McLeod (field hockey) (born 1952), New Zealand Olympic field hockey player
- Neil McLeod (police officer) (c.1846–1890), New Zealand police constable killed in the line of duty
- Neil MacLeod (footballer) (born 1960), former Australian rules footballer
