= Napier shootings =

2009 shootings in New Zealand

Coordinates: 39.4908°S 176.9028°E

- Location: Napier, New Zealand
- Date: 7–9 May 2009; 9.30 a.m. – 12.00 p.m. (UTC+12)
- Attack type: Murder-suicide, shootout, siege
- Weapon: firearms
- Deaths: 2 (including the perpetrator)
- Injuries: 3
- Perpetrator: Jan Molenaar
- Defenders: Armed Offenders Squad, Special Tactics Group

The Napier shootings (also called the Napier siege by the New Zealand media) took place on 7 May 2009 in Napier, New Zealand. At around 9.30 am, Jan Molenaar fired on police officers executing a cannabis search warrant at his house at 41 Chaucer Road, killing Senior Constable Len Snee and seriously injuring Senior Constables Bruce Miller and Grant Diver. A neighbour attempting to assist the police was also shot.

Over 100 police officers, including Armed Offenders Squad and Special Tactics Group members, were brought in to contain the gunman, who was identified as a former territorial soldier. A siege lasting over 40 hours developed, during which officers made repeated attempts under fire to retrieve the body of the slain officer. With the assistance of two Army NZLAVs, they were successful at about 5 p.m. on 8 May.

At around midday on 9 May, police found the gunman dead inside the master bedroom of the house. An inquest later determined he died from a self-inflicted gunshot to the head.

== Jan Molenaar ==
Jan Molenaar, 51, was of Ngāti Kahungunu descent and grew up in Napier, where he went to Nelson Park Primary School, Napier Intermediate School and William Colenso College. In the 1980s, he spent six years in the territorial armoured corps of the Hawke's Bay and Wellington Regiment. Molenaar is said to have been a loner, and to have missed his brother, who had killed himself after experimenting with methamphetamine.

== Timeline ==
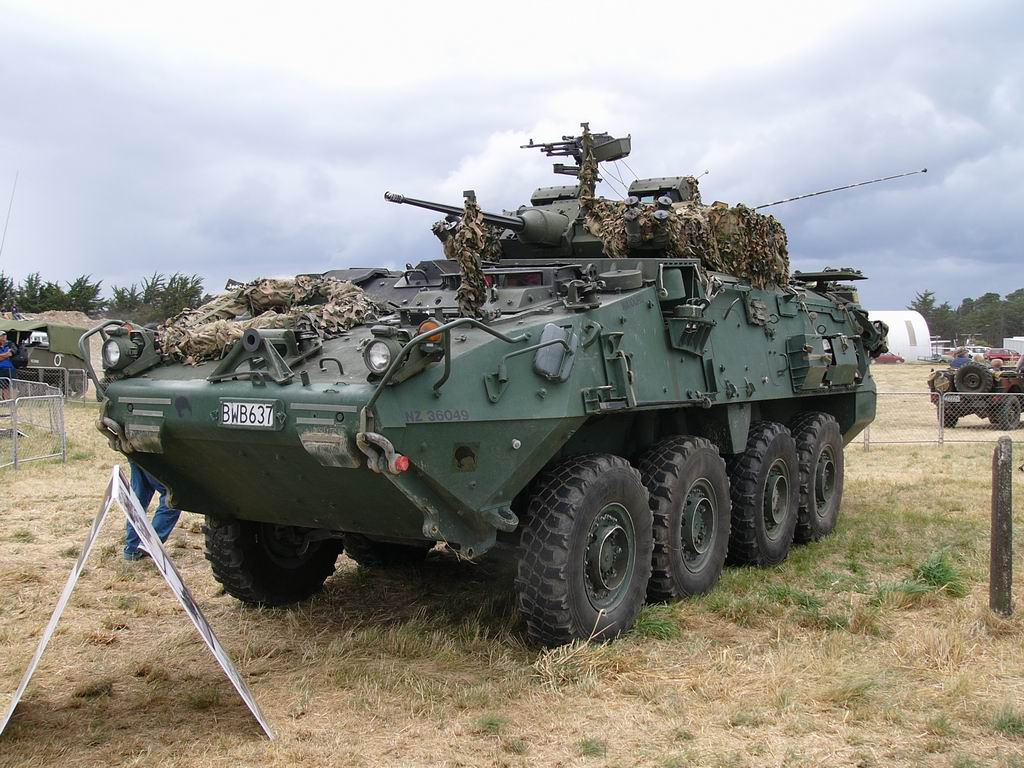
Two NZLAVs were used in the incident

The incident began when Senior Constables Snee, Miller, and Diver went to visit Molenaar's home in Napier regarding a cannabis investigation. Upon their arrival, Molenaar fired shots at the policemen, killing Snee and wounding Miller and Diver. Molenaar's neighbour Leonard Holmwood tried to assist the policemen by wrestling the firearm from him, but was shot in the leg and buttocks.

Diver sheltered behind a neighbouring house where he was able to phone for back up. The Armed Offenders Squad responded quickly, and with the aid of two members of the public they pulled Miller and Holmwood to safety.

=== 7 May ===
- 9.30 am: Senior constables Len Snee, Bruce Miller and Grant Diver arrive at the home of Jan Molenaar, to serve a cannabis search warrant. Snee is shot dead, and the two other officers and neighbour Leonard Holmwood are shot and wounded.
- 9.40 am: Police cordon off the surrounding area and evacuate local residents.
- 10.00 am: Miller and Diver are taken to hospital. Police fail to recover Snee's body after being shot at by the gunman.
- 11.03 am: Police announced that "three police officers have been involved in a shooting incident in Napier this morning. Two police officers have been injured and are in hospital. A third officer is unaccounted for at this stage."
- 12.25 pm: More shots are fired, police talk to Molenaar through a loud hailer after which more shots are fired.
- 7.15 pm: A police website media release announced "Police have been unable at this point to extricate Senior Constable Snee."
- 8.05 pm: The Special Tactics Group arrives aboard a Unimog.

=== 8 May ===
- 4.35 pm: Two of the army's light armoured vehicles, followed by a police car with officers and a police dog inside, enter the cordoned area.
- 5.00 pm: The body of Len Snee is retrieved by Police.

=== 9 May ===
- 3:30 am: A volley of shots and a large explosion are heard. Police did not confirm where the shots came from. It was speculated that police detonated an explosive device against the house's garage door.
- 12:00 pm: Police discover the body of shooter Jan Molenaar in the first floor master bedroom.

== Len Snee ==
Leonard "Len" Snee (11 March 1956 – 7 May 2009) was the 29th member of the New Zealand Police killed in the line of duty. A long-serving officer who was well known to the local community, Snee was a member of the Armed Offenders Squad and worked on drugs cases. In 1996, he was involved in the manhunt for Constable Glenn McKibbin's murderer, Terence Thompson, in Flaxmere. As with Molenaar, he was of Ngāti Kahungunu descent.

== Reactions ==
Prime Minister John Key commended the officers for their bravery.

Sacred Heart school, Nelson Park School, Napier Central School, Napier Intermediate and Napier Girls' High School were all put on lockdown for Thursday, and Nelson Park School, Napier Central School and Napier Intermediate were shut on Friday.

== Aftermath ==
An inquest determined the cause of Molenaar's death was a single self-inflicted gunshot to the head.

Molenaar had admirers in Napier, partly because of his anti-gang stance. His tangi at Ruahapia marae and funeral were well attended. Snee's tangi was at Takapau marae and his funeral in Napier's Municipal Theatre.

Molenaar's partner Delwyn Ismalia Keefe, a convicted drug dealer, received $10,000 of Accident Compensation Corporation compensation for Molenaar's suicide. A restraining order was issued against Keefe over the house the two lived in, and more than $90,000 in cash and bank accounts, so the assets could be forfeited to the Crown on her sentencing on the drug charges. In May 2011 the court ordered the forfeiture of the house and nearly $20,000.

The New Zealand Herald named Holmwood as its 2009 New Zealander of the Year for his heroism in saving Miller and Diver.

In the 2011 New Zealand bravery awards, Holmwood, two other civilians, 10 police officers and a paramedic received bravery medals for their actions during the shootings.
