= The Kids from O.W.L. =

- Written by: Grant Morris
- Directed by: Kim Gabara
- Starring: Lisa Bridger-Walker; Warrick McNeil; Ann Simpson; William Kircher; Stewart Ross; Robert Colhoun; Alasdair Kincaid; Shane Brookfield
- Composer: Tony Baker
- Country of origin: New Zealand
- Original language: English
- No. of series: 2
- No. of episodes: 26

Production
- Producer: Kim Gabara
- Editor: Bodo Hartmann
- Production company: TVNZ

Original release
- Network: TVNZ
- Release: July 1984 – 30 September 1985

The Kids from O.W.L. is a children's television series made in New Zealand and aired in 1984 and 1985. O.W.L. (The Organisation for World Liberty) was a secret government organisation whose agents were young people with physical disabilities. Using devices like laser-beam-firing crutches and computerized wheelchairs, the kids from O.W.L. always overcame the bumbling plots of operatives from S.L.I.M.E. (the Southern Latitude's International Movement for Evil).

The Kids from O.W.L. pioneered the use of electronic graphics from Apple II and Apple III computers in New Zealand. It was created and produced by Kim Gabara.

Grant Morris wrote the television series. The show collaborated with the New Zealand Crippled Children Society to make the series, whose has two main characters are disabled. Shane Brookfield and Lisa Bridger-Walker played the main characters. The second series had 13 episodes and began airing on 8 July 1985.
