= Robert Sarkies =

New Zealand film director and screenwriter

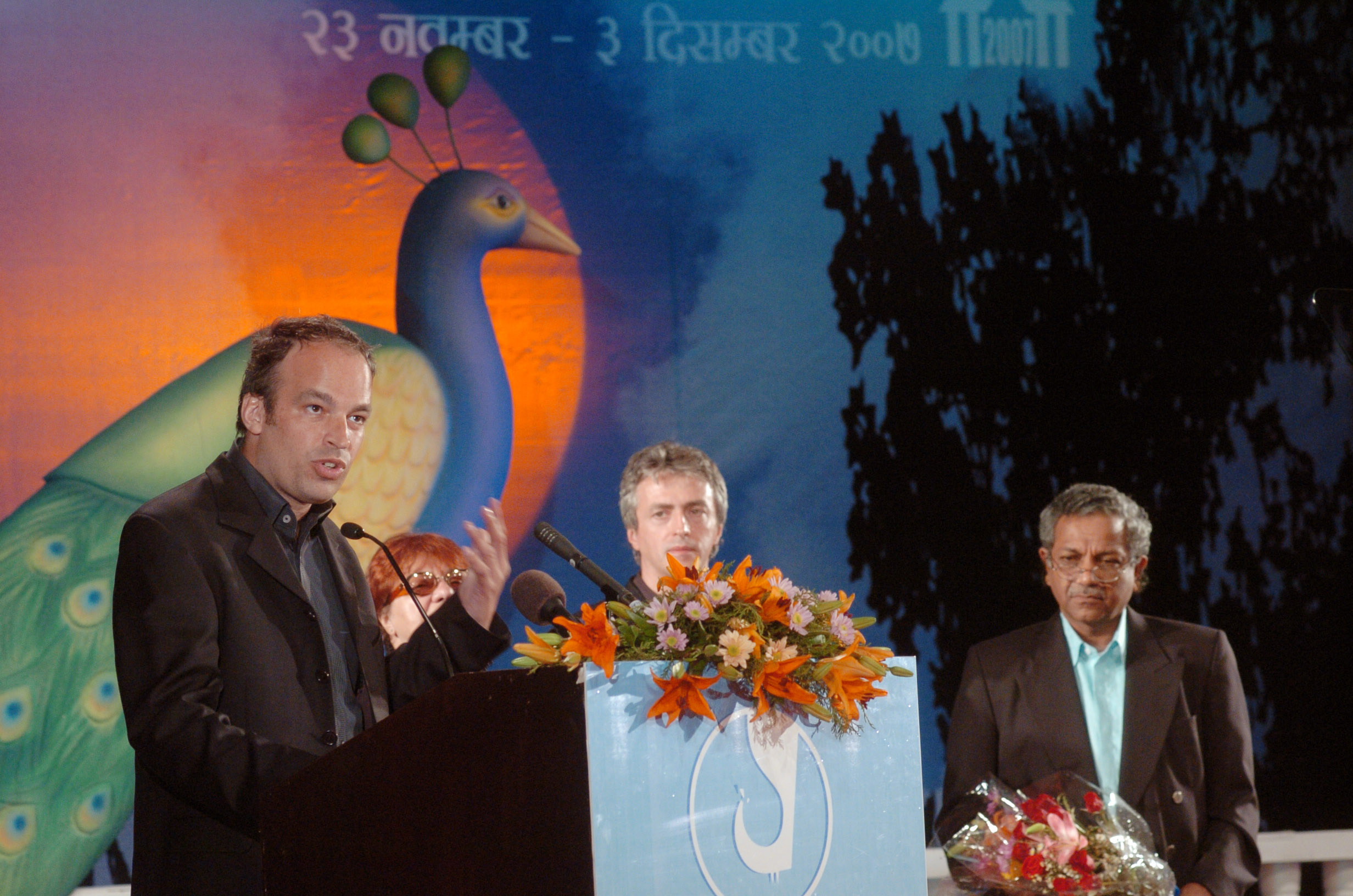
- Sarkies (left) at IFFI 2007
- Born: Dunedin, New Zealand
- Occupations: Film director, screenwriter
- Years active: 1996–present
- Father: Douglas Sarkies

Robert Sarkies is a New Zealand film director and screenwriter. He is best known for his 2006 drama film Out of the Blue and the 2014 TV movie Consent: The Louise Nicholas Story.

== Early life and education ==
Robert Sarkies grew up in the South Island city of Dunedin. He attended Kaikorai Valley College, and the University of Otago.

== Career ==
Sarkies began making short films as a teenager with fellow filmmaker Simon Perkins and Lindsay Chalmers. In 1991 he directed series 2 of Bidi Bidi To The Rescue. After winning an international award for his short Dream-makers, Sarkies began work on his most ambitious short to date: adventure comedy Signing Off (1996), which won four international awards and helped attract funding for Scarfies (1999), his feature debut. Signing Off was produced by film and television producer Lisa Chatfield.

Sarkies co-wrote the Scarfies script with his younger brother, playwright and performer Duncan, and producer Lisa Chatfield. Winner of seven awards including Best Picture and Best Director at the NZ Film Awards, and a local hit, the film is part comedy, part thriller, and partly a celebration of being a university student in Dunedin. Scarfies was later released on video in the United States under the title Crime 101.

Sarkies followed Scarfies in 2006 with the drama film Out of the Blue, produced by New Zealand producer Tim White. The film was based on the 1990 Aramoana Massacre, in which a gunman killed thirteen people in a seaside town close to Dunedin. The film emphasizes realism over melodrama, partly through handheld camerawork and a naturalistic acting style. Some of those living in Aramoana expressed opposition to the film being made; others who lost people in the tragedy agreed to do interviews with scriptwriters Sarkies and Graeme Tetley. In New Zealand, Out of the Blue became the tenth most successful local film yet released theatrically (not accounting for inflation). It also won six Qantas Film and Television Awards in September 2008, including "Best Picture - budget over $1 million".

Sarkies' third feature was 2012 black comedy Two Little Boys, starring Bret McKenzie and Australian actor and comedian Hamish Blake. The film is based on a book by Duncan Sarkies, about two sometime friends trying to hide the body of a tourist whom one of them has accidentally killed.

In 2010, dystopian TV series This Is Not My Life debuted on New Zealand television. The series centres around a man (played by Charles Mesure) who wakes up with no knowledge of the woman he appears to be married to, his children or job. Directed by Sarkies and Peter Salmon, it won a 2011 New Zealand television award for best drama series.

Sarkies first telemovie, Consent: The Louise Nicholas Story, which he also co-wrote, was again produced by Tim White. The award-winning film, which went to air in 2014, is based on the true story of Louise Nicholas, who was raped by a group of police officers as a teenager and took them to court as an adult.

In 2016 Sarkies directed another TV movie, Jean, and as of January 2025 his film Pike River is in production.

=== Unproduced scripts ===
Before making Out of the Blue, the Sarkies brothers collaborated on the script for a proposed fantasy film called The Magnificent Magic Fingers. The budget for Magic Fingers was estimated to be at least NZ$20 million.

== Filmography ==
Directed Features
Year	Title	Distribution	Notes
1999	Scarfies	Becker Entertainment	
2006	Out of the Blue	Condor Films, Dendy Films	
2012	Two Little Boys	eOne (formerly Hopscotch)	
2014	Consent: The Louise Nicholas Story		TV movie
2016	Jean		TV Movie
2025	Pike River	Madman Entertainment	
