= Aramoana =

Coastal settlement in Otago, New Zealand

- Rural settlement
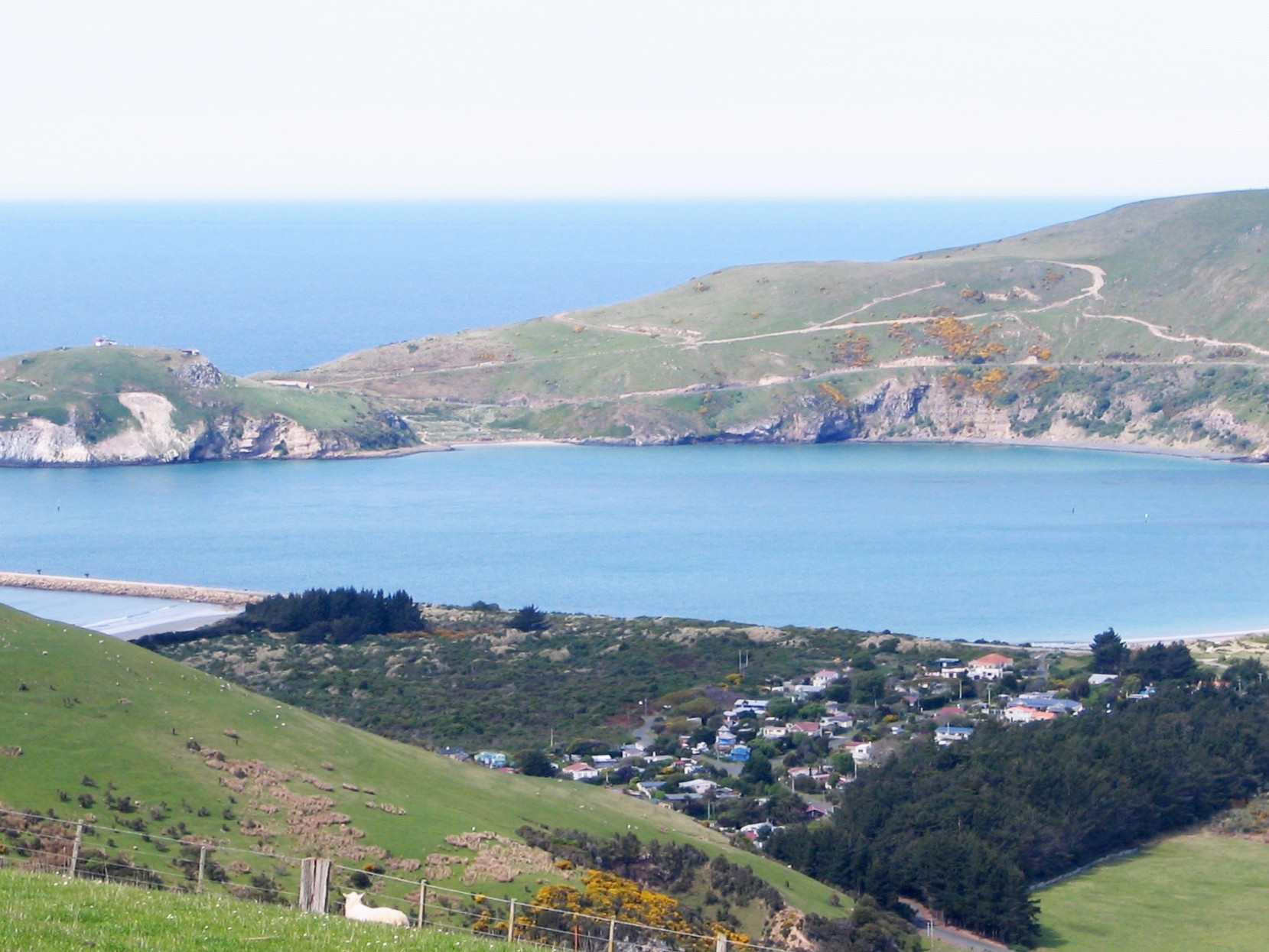
- Looking east across the mouth of Otago Harbour; Aramoana settlement to the lower right
- Interactive map of Aramoana
- Coordinates: 45°47′S 170°42′E
- Country: New Zealand
- Island: South Island
- Region: Otago
- City: Dunedin
- Community board: West Harbour Community Board
- Electorates: Dunedin; Te Tai Tonga (Māori)

Government
  - Territorial authority: Dunedin City Council
  - Regional council: Otago Regional Council
  - Mayor of Dunedin: Sophie Barker
  - Dunedin MP: Rachel Brooking
  - Te Tai Tonga MP: Tākuta Ferris

Area
  - Total: 0.49 km^{2} (0.19 sq mi)

Population (June 2025)
  - Total: 130
  - Density: 270/km^{2} (690/sq mi)
- Time zone: UTC+12 (NZST)
  - Summer (DST): UTC+13 (NZDT)
- Area code: 03
- Local iwi: Ngāi Tahu

Aramoana is a small coastal settlement 27 kilometres (17 mi) north of Dunedin on the South Island of New Zealand. The settlement's permanent population in the 2001 Census was 261. Supplementing this are seasonal visitors from the city who occupy cribs. The name Aramoana is Māori for "pathway of the sea".

It was founded by the Otago Harbour Board and established in the 1880s as a pilot station for navigation around the mouth of the Otago Harbour. This area grew into a small farming village. In the 1950s, the town became popular as a beach resort and a rural life village due to the construction of a mole to inhibit the spread of tidal sands into the mouth of Otago Harbour and was surveyed and amalgamated as a suburb of Port Chalmers borough.

It is the site of the Aramoana massacre, New Zealand's second deadliest criminal shooting, on 13 and 14 November 1990.

== Location and natural environment ==
The settlement is located on a sand dune spit at the mouth of the Otago Harbour, opposite the end of the Otago Peninsula. The main channel of the harbour is kept clear by the Aramoana mole, an artificial breakwater which extends for 1200 metres from Aramoana. The mole was originally intended to extend another 600 metres into the ocean, however due to tidal patterns and the instability of the construction, no attempt to extend beyond the current length was thought to be possible. The mole was begun in 1884 using prison labour, which the Otago Harbour Board replaced with unemployed workers in 1886.

To the southwestern side of the township extend expansive salty mudflats from the head of the Aramoana Spit around the harbourside to the township of Te Ngaru. This area is a protected Wildlife Sanctuary, which hosts a range of plant and animal life, both native and exotic.

On the other side of the Spit is an expanse of beach, truncated by the Aramoana Mole. The beach and sand dunes to the east are known as Shelly Beach. The beach to the west is known as Big Beach and extends for over two kilometres. At points along this beach, steep rockfaces come down to the waterline. These are well used for practical training by local rock-climbers. Seals can be found sun bathing on the rocks of the spit. Enthusiastic Land yachters use this beach, especially in the favourable Nor’Easter winds.

== Demographics ==
Aramoana is described by Statistics New Zealand as a rural settlement. It covers 0.49 km^{2} (0.19 sq mi), and had an estimated population of 130 as of June 2025, with a population density of 265 people per km^{2}. It is part of the much larger Mount Cargill statistical area.

Historical population
Year	Pop.	±% p.a.
2006	78	—
2013	87	+1.57%
2018	111	+4.99%

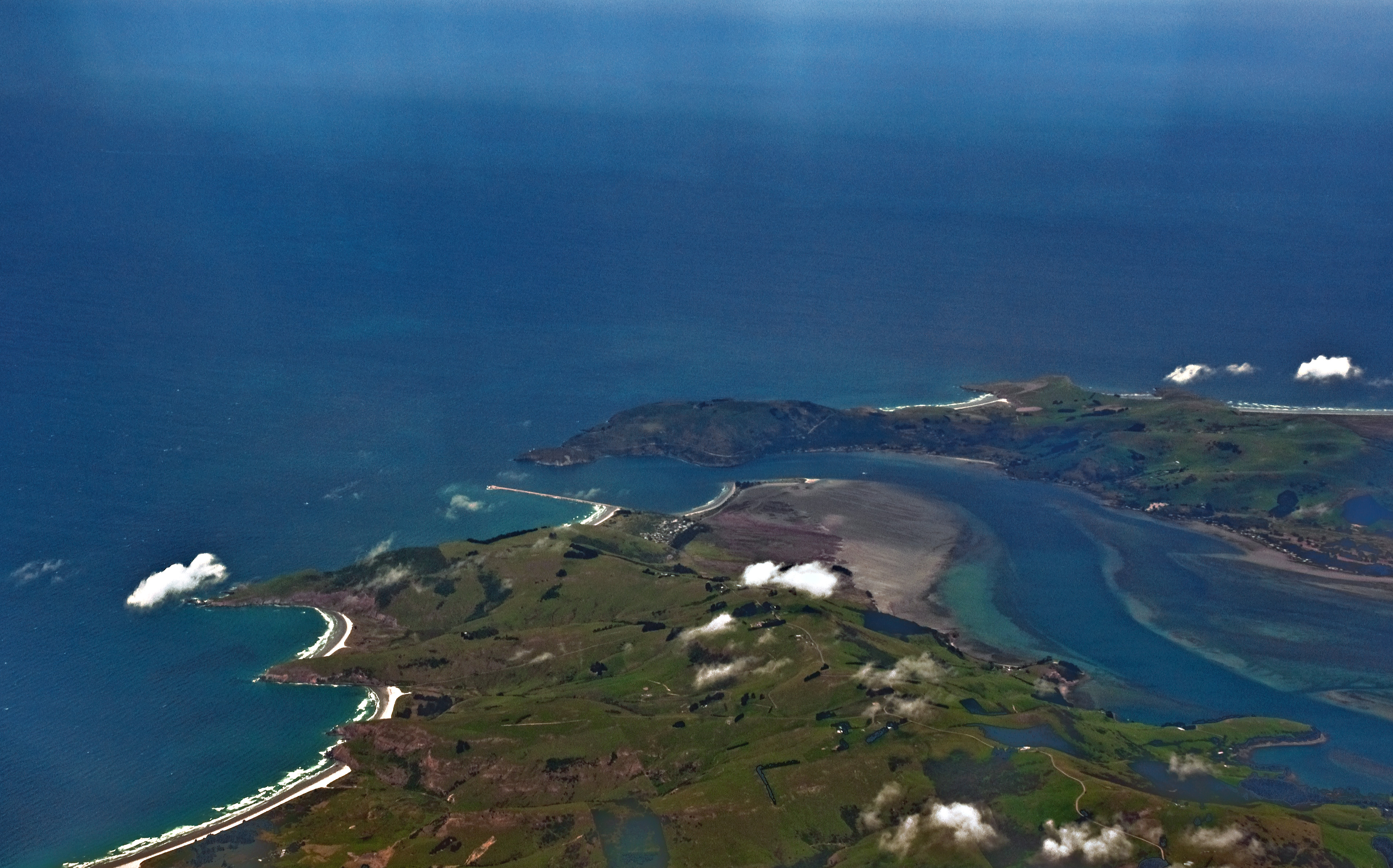
Aerial view to the east across the entrance to Otago Harbour, Aramoana is just below the centre of the picture, with the mudflats and mole clearly visible.

Aramoana had a population of 111 at the 2018 New Zealand census, an increase of 24 people (27.6%) since the 2013 census, and an increase of 33 people (42.3%) since the 2006 census. There were 54 households, comprising 69 males and 42 females, giving a sex ratio of 1.64 males per female. The median age was 52.2 years (compared with 37.4 years nationally), with 15 people (13.5%) aged under 15 years, 9 (8.1%) aged 15 to 29, 72 (64.9%) aged 30 to 64, and 18 (16.2%) aged 65 or older.

Ethnicities were 97.3% European/Pākehā, 2.7% Māori, and 2.7% other ethnicities. People may identify with more than one ethnicity.

Although some people chose not to answer the census's question about religious affiliation, 59.5% had no religion, 21.6% were Christian and 8.1% had other religions.

Of those at least 15 years old, 21 (21.9%) people had a bachelor's or higher degree, and 12 (12.5%) people had no formal qualifications. The median income was $29,500, compared with $31,800 nationally. 18 people (18.8%) earned over $70,000 compared to 17.2% nationally. The employment status of those at least 15 was that 51 (53.1%) people were employed full-time, 12 (12.5%) were part-time, and 3 (3.1%) were unemployed.

== Save Aramoana Campaign ==
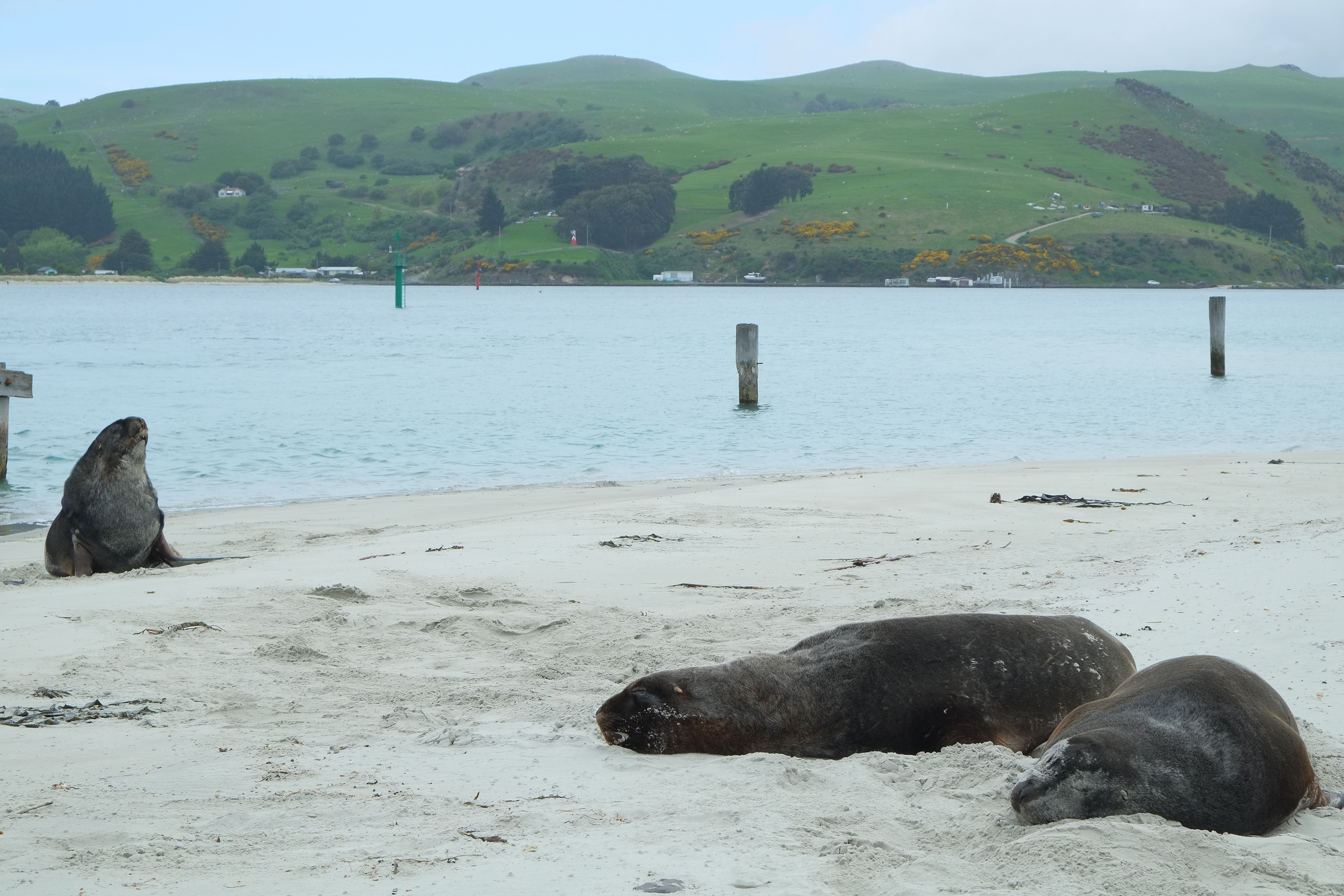
Endangered New Zealand sea lions resting at the end of Aramoana spit, the site of the Aramoana Pilot's Wharf.

In the late 1970s Aramoana was proposed as the site of a major aluminium smelter by a consortium of New Zealand-based Fletcher Challenge, Australia's CSR Limited and Swiss firm Alusuisse. An aluminium smelter was already operating at Tiwai Point when the smelter at Aramoana was proposed.

The Save Aramoana Campaign was formed in 1974 to oppose the smelter. Among the leaders were three Otago psychologists: Peter Bradshaw, Jules Older and Richard Thomson. A large number of Otago artists and performers also contributed to the successful drive to save Aramoana.

== Aramoana massacre ==
Aramoana gained notoriety as the site of a mass murder that occurred on 13 and 14 November 1990. Resident David Gray, an unemployed gun collector, went on a rampage in which 13 people were shot dead, before Gray was shot by police.

A monument to the 13 victims stands on the dunes near to the Aramoana Mole.

In 2006, New Zealand director Robert Sarkies released a film based on the events, Out of the Blue.
