= Neil McLeod (police officer) =

NZ Police constable killed by criminal act

- Born: 1846; Rona, Inverness-shire, Scotland
- Died: 30 July 1890 (aged 44); Dargaville, New Zealand
- Known for: First New Zealand police officer killed by a criminal act
- Relatives: Widow and 6 children
- Police career
- Country: New Zealand Police
- Service years: 1871–1890
- Rank: First-class Constable
- Badge no.: 91

Neil McLeod (1846 – 30 July 1890) was a Constable of the New Zealand Police. He was shot and killed while aboard the steamer Minnie Casey at Mangawhare Wharf (near Dargaville) by gum-digger Henry Funcke.

== Early life ==
Neil McLeod was born on Rona, Inverness-shire, in 1846. Together with his family he emigrated to New Zealand aboard the ship Viscount Canning, arriving in 1865. The family initially settled in the Thames goldfields where they were involved in gold mining.

== Police career ==
When he was 25, in 1871, he moved to the Waikato where he joined the Constabulary Field Force and was initially stationed to Alexandra (now known as Pirongia). In 1880 he was transferred to the Auckland police force, where he was placed in charge of the Warkworth and Matakana police districts. In 1887, he was transferred to Dargaville.

== Death ==
McLeod, his wife and family were travelling to Auckland, having boarded the steamer at Dargaville. Funcke also came aboard at Dargaville, with a gun, a concealed revolver and a knife. Funcke was very noisy during the trip, and the captain of the Minnie Casey took away his gun. Just after the steamer left Mangawhare Wharf, he threatened to shoot some of the passengers if he did not get his gun back. The steamer put back to Mangawhare Wharf, and Constables McLeod and Scott took Funcke ashore. From the shore Funcke once more demanded his gun as the Minnie Casey left again, and fired five shots at the departing steamer. Standing at the railing, McLeod was hit in the heart by the third shot. He exclaimed "My God" and died.

The steamer returned to Dargaville, where McLeod's body was taken off. A group of settlers armed themselves with rifles and, led by Constables Scott and Carr, walked back to Mangawhare Wharf in pursuit. The group found Funcke still at the wharf, demanded he surrender, and fired a blank shot. Funcke lifted up his hands as if to fire and was shot twice, in the groin and chest. He fell, and was arrested. He was reportedly a 'maniac' and had been drinking before the incident.

McLeod's body was taken to Auckland for burial.

== Henry Funcke ==
Henry Funcke was born about 1843. The newspapers of the time reported little about Funcke's origins other than he had no relatives in New Zealand. He was described as a watchmender and gumdigger and was known to police and reporters, having previously been before the courts. He was charged with Constable McLeod's murder and tried in September 1890. He was found not guilty by reason of insanity and confined. He died, at the age of 54, on 9 August 1897, at the Avondale Asylum. His death was widely reported in New Zealand newspapers.

== See also ==
- List of New Zealand police officers killed in the line of duty
