= Aramoana massacre =

1990 mass shooting in Aramoana, New Zealand

Coordinates: 45°46′39″S 170°42′12″E

- Anti-Terrorist Squad officers crouch on Muri Street (right), before storming Gray's beach house (left)
- Location: Aramoana, Otago Harbour, New Zealand
- Date: 13–14 November 1990; 7:30 – 5:50 p.m.
- Attack type: Mass shooting, siege, shootout, arson
- Weapons: .223-calibre Norinco Type 84s sporting rifle; 7.62x39mm Norinco SKS semi-automatic rifle; .22-calibre Squires and Bingham Model 16 semi-automatic sporting rifle; .22-calibre Winchester Model 750 rifle with suppressor; .22-calibre Vickers-Martini MK II single-shot rifle; .22-calibre Remington Nylon 66 semi-automatic rifle; Air rifle; Fire
- Deaths: 14 (including the perpetrator)
- Injuries: 3
- Perpetrator: David Malcolm Gray

The Aramoana massacre was a mass shooting that occurred on 13 November 1990 in the small seaside township of Aramoana, northeast of Dunedin, New Zealand. Resident David Gray killed 13 people, including local police Sergeant Stewart Guthrie, one of the first responders to the reports of a shooting, after a verbal dispute between Gray and his next-door neighbour. After a careful house-to-house search the next day, police officers led by the Anti-Terrorist Squad (now known as the Special Tactics Group) located Gray, and shot and injured him as he came out of a house firing from the hip. He died in an ambulance while being transported to hospital.

At the time, the incident was the deadliest mass shooting in New Zealand's history; it was surpassed 28 years later by the Christchurch mosque shootings. After the shootings, sweeping changes were made to New Zealand's firearms legislation in 1992, including 10-year photographic licences and tight restrictions on military style semi-automatic firearms.

== Details ==
=== Initial incident ===
The massacre began on 13 November at 7:30 p.m. when Gray confronted neighbour Garry Holden about one of Holden's daughters wandering onto his property. After the confrontation, Gray went into his house, retrieved a Norinco 84S semi-automatic rifle, walked outside and shot Holden multiple times in his chest, before walking over to him and shooting him fatally through the head.

Nearby were three young girls: Holden's two daughters, Chiquita and Jasmine, and his girlfriend Julie Ann Bryson's daughter, Rewa. The girls ran into Holden's house to hide as Gray walked onto Holden's property. He quickly found Chiquita and shot her in the chest and arm with a Squires and Bingham Model 16 .22-calibre semi-automatic sporting rifle, with one of the bullets lodging in her abdomen. Shortly after shooting her, Gray found the other two girls and killed them.

Chiquita, who managed to escape by running out of the back door, fled past her father's body to Bryson's nearby house, while Gray set the Holden house on fire. Bryson, realising that Rewa and Jasmine were still in the Holden house, drove her van there with Chiquita in an attempt to save the girls. Gray shot at the van as it passed the house, which was by then ablaze.

Gray started shooting indiscriminately, targeting a utility vehicle full of locals who had seen the Holden house burning and stopped to help. He first shot Vanessa Percy several times in the back as she ran down the street in terror; she died a few hours later at the scene. He then turned towards three children. He killed the two boys, Leo Wilson and Dion Percy. The boys' sister, Stacey, was critically injured by a bullet to her abdomen, but survived. Ross Percy, the children's father, who had been driving them home after a day fishing when they saw the fire, was fatally shot in the head. Next, Aleki Tali was killed. Gray then entered the home of Tim Jamieson, killing him and another elderly local, former Green Island mayor Vic Crimp. The next victim was James Dickson, who was looking for his dog. Eva Helen Dickson, James' mother, and neighbour Chris Cole went into the road to see what the noise was. Gray shot at both of them, wounding Cole who was in a phone booth calling the police and forcing Dickson to dive for cover. Dickson, who had recently had a hip replacement and was unable to walk without assistance, pulled herself along on her stomach using her arms and feet in a ditch to get inside and called 111 (the emergency telephone number). She then crawled back to Cole to tell him help was coming. By this stage, it was getting dark and the dispatcher advised her to stay inside. Dickson later received the George Medal for bravery. Help arrived too late for Cole, who died in the hospital.

=== First responders ===
The first armed police officer to arrive was Sergeant Stewart Guthrie, officer in charge of Port Chalmers police station and an NCO in the Armed Offenders Squad (AOS). He came armed with a Smith & Wesson Model 10 police revolver (front-line police in New Zealand do not routinely carry firearms). Guthrie enlisted the help of Constable Russell Anderson, who had arrived a short time earlier with the fire service. He armed Anderson with a rifle belonging to a resident. With darkness approaching, the pair moved through the township to Gray's house, where Guthrie deployed the constable to cover the front while he moved to cover the more dangerous rear of the house. Detective Paul Alan Knox and two constables arrived, starting the first step of the "cordon, contain, appeal" standard police strategy for armed offenders.

Guthrie observed Gray and relayed his movements inside the house to the police communications centre. After some time he lost sight of the gunman, and advised the detective to warn everyone to be alert. Anderson spotted Gray coming out the front of his property and issued a challenge, at which the gunman retreated quickly, passing through the rear of his property. Taking cover in the sand dunes of a neighbouring crib, Guthrie encountered Gray coming out of the darkness. Yelling at the gunman to surrender, he fired a warning shot. Gray shouted, "Don't shoot!", leading Guthrie to believe he was surrendering. However, Gray suddenly fired several times, one shot striking Guthrie in the head, killing him instantly.

Minutes later the Dunedin branch of the AOS began to arrive and sealed off the township with a roadblock about 250 metres along the only road out of Aramoana, securing it with an armoured car. AOS units from Christchurch, Timaru, and Invercargill were called in for support. The situation was considered dangerous as Gray had a scoped rifle, making him potentially accurate at long range. By this point, the police had ordered that Gray was to be shot on sight – without a warning shot.

=== Anti-Terrorist Squad ===
Armed police search cribs in Aramoana for David Gray, 14 November

Commissioner of Police John Jamieson authorised the Anti-Terrorist Squad (ATS) (now known as the Special Tactics Group (STG)), the specialist counter terrorist unit, to travel to Dunedin and locate Gray; group members were in Christchurch, Wellington and Auckland. Unable to get transport with the Air Force, the group caught the early morning business flight on the 14th.

They took Heckler & Koch MP5 submachine guns, encountering some problems taking firearms on a commercial aircraft. Also on the flight were Minister of Police John Banks, the Commissioner, and Julie Holden, who described Aramoana to the ATS. A large number of reporters met the flight on arrival at Dunedin. A bus took the ATS to Port Chalmers, which was choked with vehicles, where residents from Aramoana briefed the group about the township and Gray. ATS members took a reconnaissance flight over the township in an RNZAF UH-1H Iroquois helicopter. The helicopter initially flew high as it had no armour protection from small arms fire; Gray had shot at a private news helicopter earlier that morning.

The crew of the Air Force Iroquois then carried out low, slow passes over areas of bush where Gray was believed to be hiding, carrying armed police and dropping tear gas grenades as it did so, in an attempt to "flush him out". The Iroquois crew flew for over eight hours in support of the operation during the day, including positioning police snipers in the surrounding hills. After the initial reconnaissance flight, the ATS moved out as two squads and met up with the Timaru AOS, who were holding positions. The group received fire orders: "if he has a firearm, he is to be shot". Meanwhile, Gray had entered a crib, eaten a small meal and gone to sleep.

=== Manhunt and shootout ===
Some Christchurch members of the ATS moved into Aramoana at about 6:00 a.m. on 14 November. The ATS went first to Gray's house, passing bodies on the street. After clearing neighbouring houses, they put a stun grenade into Gray's, blowing out the windows, followed by tear gas. Kicking down the door, they discovered it was empty. The group then worked down the road, checking each house, a squad on either side of the street. The ATS called up the AOS, with members from Wanganui, Palmerston North, Napier, and New Plymouth, to their backs. The group discovered Sergeant Guthrie's revolver in a garden, and a woman who had been hiding under a table for more than twenty hours.

The house in Aramoana where David Gray was killed on 14 November 1990.

After a long day searching from house to house, the ATS checked a crib with a broken window on the north-eastern side of the township. The crib had large hedges on both sides, and a fibrolite shed at the rear. The group spotted Gray briefly at a window, and a battle ensued. Police put a stun grenade through a window, but it bounced off a mattress that Gray had placed as a barricade and landed back near police. Police fired teargas into the crib. Gray began shooting not at police but through the fibrolite shed.

The ATS opened fire, both sides shooting for two minutes, Gray walking around inside firing randomly. A stray bullet that passed through the crib struck an ATS officer in the ankle. As soon as the shooting erupted, the Air Force Iroquois took up position overhead to help ensure Gray could not escape into nearby bushes in the fading light of the approaching second night.

=== Gray's death ===
At around 5:50 p.m., Gray ran out of the house, shooting from the hip and shouting, "Kill me! Fucking kill me, you bastards!" He took several steps before being hit and knocked down by ATS gunfire. Gray was hit five times: in the eye, neck, chest and twice in the groin. Even with these injuries, he struggled fiercely against police, breaking free of plastic handcuffs before being re-handcuffed, while berating police for not having killed him. Ambulance officers treated him at the scene and on the way to Dunedin hospital by providing him oxygen, but the ambulance did not get very far out of Aramoana, and at 6:10 p.m., Gray died from his wounds.

Inside the crib police found a .22-calibre Vickers-Martini MK II single-shot rifle, a .22-calibre Winchester Model 750 rifle fitted with a suppressor, a Norinco SKS semi-automatic rifle, a .22-calibre Squires and Bingham Model 16, an air rifle, hundreds of rounds of .22 ammunition, and approximately 100 rounds of .223 ammunition. Gray was carrying a .22-calibre Remington Nylon 66 as well as the .223 Norinco 84 when he was shot. Police had fired between 50 and 60 shots, and at least 150 police officers were involved in the operation.

Rewa Bryson and Jasmine Holden's charred bodies were found in what remained of the Holden family home. Fourteen people, including Gray, were left dead by the end of the incident.

== Perpetrator ==
David Malcolm Gray

David Malcolm Gray (20 November 1956 – 14 November 1990), aged 33, an unemployed resident of Aramoana, was born in Dunedin, and raised in Port Chalmers. His father, David Francis Gray, worked in a manufacturing company and his mother, Mary Elizabeth Gray, was a machinist. He had two siblings, sister Joan and brother Barry.

Gray attended Port Chalmers Primary School, and later enrolled at Otago Boys' High School from 1971 to 1973, where he was a mid-stream student. A former classmate stated Gray was quiet and unassuming, and that "there was nothing frightening about him then". Those who knew Gray remembered him as having been a loner since primary school. He had worked occasionally as a farmhand but had been unemployed for a few years before 1990.

Both Gray's parents predeceased him, his father on 30 November 1978 and his mother on 22 January 1985. His sister said the death of their mother deeply affected him, and prompted him to move from Port Chalmers to the Gray family holiday home in Aramoana.

Gray was a regular customer at Galaxy Books and Records in Lower Stuart Street, Dunedin. Bill Brosnan, the owner, knew him for seven years and said he was a fan of military books and Soldier of Fortune magazine. Books by American survivalist Kurt Saxon were found among Gray's collection, as well as written correspondence between the two. In January 1990, he threatened an assistant of the bookshop with what appeared to be a shotgun in a cardboard box, and Brosnan served him with a trespass notice in February. His sister said he was an animal lover. Locals said this was a source of conflict with his next-door neighbour Garry Holden, whose pets kept dying.

== Casualties ==
=== Killed ===
- Rewa Ariki Bryson, 11, Julie Bryson's adopted daughter;
- Simon Christopher "Chris" Cole, 62;
- Victor James "Vic" Crimp, 71;
- James Alexander "Jim" Dickson, 45;
- Sergeant Stewart Graeme "Stu" Guthrie, 41, Port Chalmers police officer;
- Garry John Holden, 38;
- Jasmine Amber Holden, 11, daughter of Garry Holden;
- Magnus "Tim" Jamieson, 69;
- Ross James Percy, 42;
- Vanessa Grace Percy, 26, wife of Ross Percy;
- Dion Raymond Jack Percy, 6, son of Ross and Vanessa Percy;
- Aleki Tali, 41;
- Leo Wilson, 6.

=== Wounded ===
- Stacey Percy, 3, daughter of Ross and Vanessa Percy;
- Chiquita Holden, 9, daughter of Garry Holden;
- Detective Stephen Vaughan, Wellington police officer (referred to as "Gamma" in Bill O'Brien's account).

== Causes ==
Gray's mental and physical state worsened in the months leading up to the attack. There was some evidence of a progressive decline in his mental state before the shootings, as he alienated the few friends he had. On the morning of 13 November, he travelled into Dunedin, and visited a bank where he objected angrily to a NZ$2.00 (equivalent to $5 in 2026) bank fee for a cheque.

He then went to Elio's Gun Shop in King Edward Street, South Dunedin, placing a $100 deposit on a gun he intended to collect the next week. At the Continental Coffee Bar, he was served a cold pie, and became confrontational. After being asked to leave, he threatened the owners saying: "I'll be back, I'm going to get you. I'll blow you away."

== Aftermath ==
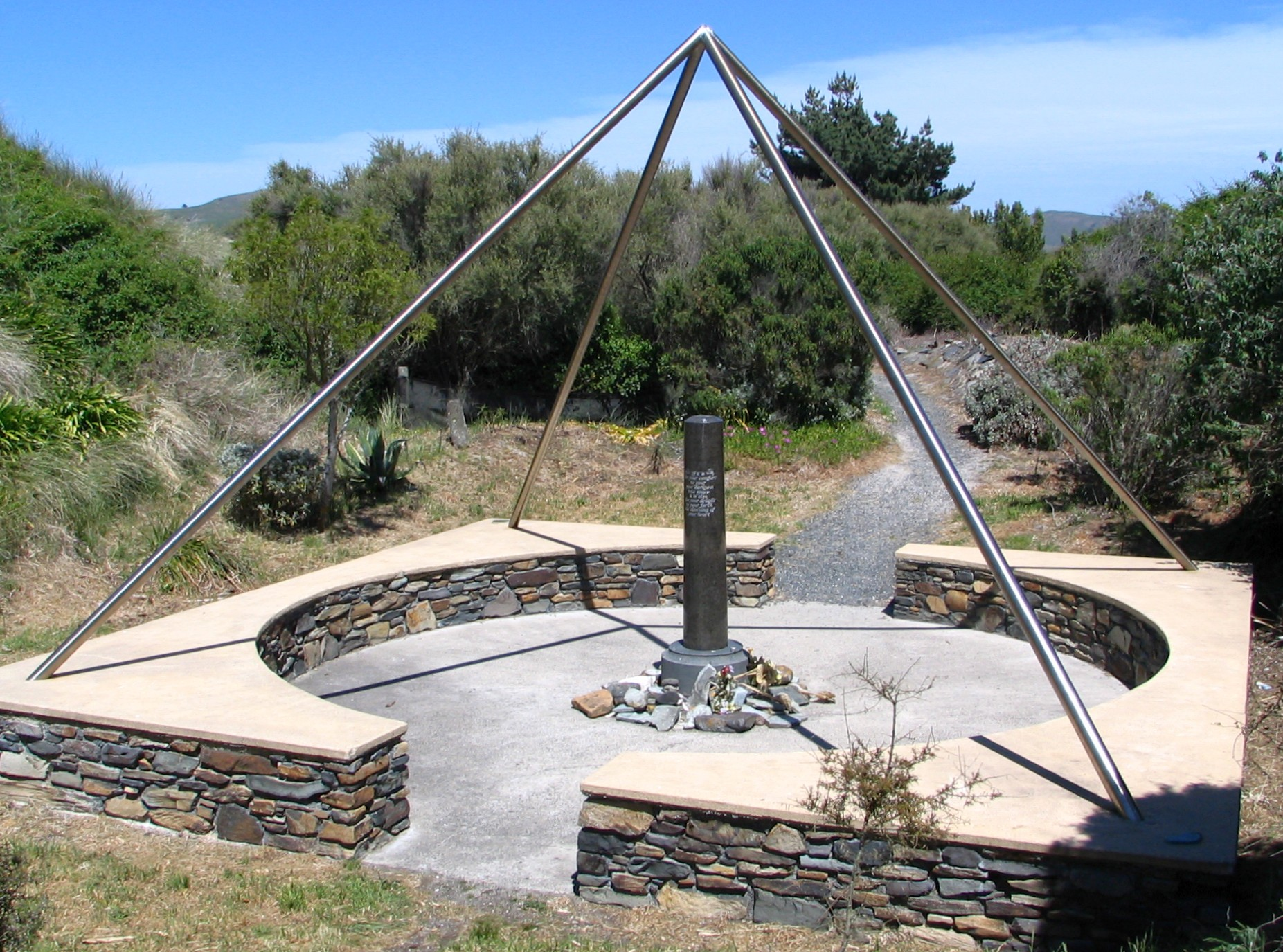
The memorial at Aramoana, listing those killed

Three days after the incident, Gray's house at 27 Muri Street in Aramoana was deliberately set on fire and burnt to the ground. The Port Chalmers Fire Brigade attended and doused surrounding vegetation to prevent the fire spreading; around fifty residents watched it burn and reportedly laughed mockingly as it did so. Gray's relatives asked that any investigation of arson be stopped, when contacted by police.

The massacre was the deadliest mass shooting in New Zealand's history until the Christchurch mosque massacre at Al Noor Mosque and Linwood Islamic Centre in Christchurch on 15 March 2019.

It sparked lengthy debate about gun control, as Gray's primary weapon was a Norinco 84S 5.56mm semi-automatic rifle which had a similar appearance to and internal mechanism based on the Russian AK-47 assault rifle, and he owned three other semi-automatic firearms. Four of the dead victims and one of the injured were proven forensically to have been shot with the Norinco rifle, and another of the injured had been shot with Gray's .22 cal Squires Bingham rifle. Fragments recovered from other victims did not lead to an identification of the weapon.

The incident directly resulted in an amendment to New Zealand's firearms legislation in 1992, tightening gun control and the creation of the military-style semi-automatic category of firearms.

=== Bravery awards ===
A number of those involved received bravery awards:

- George Cross – Sergeant Stewart Guthrie (posthumous);
- George Medal – Mrs Eva Helen Dickson;
- Queen's Gallantry Medal – Victor James Crimp QSM (posthumous), Constable Don Nicholas Fraser Harvey, Detective Paul Alan Knox, Constable Terry Edward Van Turnhout, Senior Constable David Thomas Weir;
- Queen's Commendation for Brave Conduct – Sergeant Michael Arthur Kyne, Constable Timothy Philip Ashton, Constable Robert William Barlass, Constable Peter Gerard McCarthy, Chiquita Danielle Holden.

=== Police commendations ===
In addition, a number of police officers who were involved in the incident received internal police merit awards.

- Gold Merit Award – Inspector Murray James Forbes (forward commander of the two anti-terrorist squads), Detective Stephen Patrick Vaughan;
- Certificate of Appreciation – Detective Sergeant Brian Keith Woodcock (squad leader), Constable Gregory James Cummings, Constable Michael Lyn Rusbatch (squad members).

=== Memorials ===
- A memorial to the victims was erected in the township.
- A memorial to Sergeant Stewart Guthrie was erected at Dunedin Police Station. His name was also added to the memorial wall at the Royal New Zealand Police College and a memorial tribute published on the police website. Police and the Police Museum also mourn Sergeant Guthrie's death by issuing statements upon its anniversary.

=== Subsequent events ===
In 2009, Mrs Dickson's George Medal was thought to have been stolen from a museum, as it could not be found. After the theft began circulating on the news and social media, it was found the following year in a cupboard in the museum where it had been stored and poorly catalogued.

In February 2018, relatives sold the George Cross awarded to Sergeant Stewart Guthrie to Lord Ashcroft. The Ministry of Culture and Heritage was criticised for approving the sale.

In 2018 (27 years later), survivors Chiquita Holden (aged 37) and Detective Stephen Vaughan (aged 55) married in a low-key, surprise wedding. Both were wounded during the incident but survived. They had first met in Dunedin Hospital, whilst recovering from their injuries, where they had compared scars and signed each other's casts. Vaughan had retired from the police in 2012, after a 30-year career, and been awarded an ONZM in 2016 for his services to police and the community. Holden had become a homicide specialist for Victim Support.

== Cultural influence ==
=== Books ===
At least two non-fiction books have been written about the shootings: Tragedy at Aramoana by journalist Paul Bensemann; and Aramoana: Twenty-two hours of terror by police officer Bill O'Brien. There are chapters devoted to the shootings in Gordon Johnston's history of the settlement, Journey to Aramoana – His Story, and Confessions from the Front Line by STG leader Murray Forbes.

=== Film and television ===
A feature film based on the massacre, Out of the Blue, directed by Robert Sarkies and starring Karl Urban, premiered at the Toronto International Film Festival on 12 September 2006. The production faced opposition from some citizens in Aramoana, which resulted in the majority of the movie having to be filmed in another nearby township. However, eventually the community did allow a small number of scenes to be filmed in Aramoana. They agreed to the making of the movie only if the title was not "Aramoana" and if they were to see the movie beforehand.

Bryan Bruce's 1997 documentary, In Cold Blood, investigates David Gray and the events leading up to the killings at Aramoana in 1990, examines psychological similarities between Gray and other mass murderers, and probes into New Zealand legislation around gun laws.

=== Music ===
The massacre was an inspiration for the Mutton Birds' song "A Thing Well Made" on their self-titled debut album. The song is narrated by a man who owns a sporting goods store in Christchurch. As the song closes, he describes his work for the day, which involves sending "one of those AK-47s for some collector down the line". Dunedin band the Chills more directly address the Aramoana incident in the song "Strange Case" from the 1992 album Soft Bomb. Members of the newly formed Wellington band Goatrider were inspired to write the song "David Gray", which subsequently appeared on their 1992 limited edition cassette release FTS.

== See also ==
- Gun law in New Zealand
- List of massacres in New Zealand
