= Stewart Guthrie =

New Zealand police sergeant (1948–1990)

Stewart Graeme Guthrie GC
- Born: 22 November 1948; Dunedin, New Zealand
- Died: 13 November 1990 (aged 41); Aramoana, New Zealand
- Cause of death: Murdered
- Other name: Stu
- Education: Otago Boys' High School
- Known for: Heroic acts during the Aramoana massacre
- Partner: Sandra Guthrie
- Children: 3
- Awards: George Cross
- Police career
- Allegiance: New Zealand
- Department: New Zealand Police
- Service years: 1975–1990
- Rank: Sergeant
- Badge no.: 5024

Stewart Graeme Guthrie, GC (22 November 1948 – 13 November 1990) was a New Zealand Police sergeant and a recipient of the George Cross, then the highest award in the British Commonwealth for conspicuous gallantry not in the face of an enemy. He received the award for his role in the police response to the Aramoana massacre, during which he lost his life.

== Aramoana massacre ==
Guthrie, a New Zealand Police sergeant in the Armed Offenders Squad, was sole duty officer at Port Chalmers police station on 13 November 1990 when he received a report that a man was firing a weapon indiscriminately at Aramoana, a small seaside township 8 km north-east of Port Chalmers.

Guthrie immediately went to the town and liaised with Police Constable Russell Anderson, who had arrived separately with the fire brigade. New Zealand police are generally unarmed, but because of the serious nature Guthrie had brought a police Smith & Wesson Model 10 revolver and armed Anderson with a rifle belonging to a local resident, before trying to apprehend the gunman. By this time, Guthrie had learned the gunman had killed several people.

Guthrie knew the gunman, David Gray, and located him inside his house. Guthrie instructed the constable to cover the front of the house, while he took the more dangerous position at the rear of the property.

Gray left his house by the front entrance and went towards Anderson, but retreated through his house when challenged. Guthrie meanwhile had taken cover behind a sand dune, at the rear of a crib next-door to Gray's. He was lying with revolver in one hand and police radio in the other, and transmitted when he encountered Gray coming out of the rear of his house. Guthrie challenged the gunman, "Stop, David, or I shoot", and fired a warning shot into the air. The gunman responded by firing a series of shots, one of which struck Guthrie in the head, killing him. In all, the gunman killed thirteen people and seriously wounded two, before Special Tactics Group police shot him dead the next day.

== Funeral ==
The funeral for Guthrie was held at St. Paul's Cathedral on 19 November 1990, with full police honours. Around 2,000 people, including 700 police officers, attended. The service and final blessing were given by the Anglican Bishop of Dunedin, the Rt Rev Dr Penny Jamieson, and he received the naval honour of the piping the side, followed by a private cremation.

== Citation ==
The citation for Guthrie's George Cross was published in a supplement to the London Gazette on 18 February 1992, reading:

On 13th November 1990 at the seaside resort of Aramoana, located on the outskirts of Dunedin, a young man ran amok with a firearm and massacred twelve people before being fatally shot by Police the next day.

Sergeant Guthrie, the officer in charge of the Port Chalmers Police Station, was the sole duty officer at the time the incident was reported and was able to identify the gunman as a person he knew. Sergeant Guthrie went to the Aramoana township alone and armed. On arrival he was able to call on the services of another Constable. Sergeant Guthrie took immediate command of the situation, armed the Constable with a privately owned rifle and the pair reconnoitred the village. Their every movement was fraught with danger as they moved about the village being constantly reminded of their own danger by the extent of the visible carnage, the gunman having already killed twelve people.

With limited resources available to him and impending darkness Sergeant Guthrie had the task of locating and containing the crazed gunman, dealing with the wounded and preventing further loss of life. On arrival near the gunman's house Sergeant Guthrie deployed the Constable to cover the front of the house while he located himself at the more dangerous position at the rear. A thin cordon of the gunman's house was later completed by the arrival of a Detective and two Constables.

The gunman had been sighted within his house and it can only be presumed that Sergeant Guthrie chose the dangerous position based on his sense of responsibility and the fact that he knew the area and the gunman. The Sergeant had given clear and concise situation reports to Police control and clearly indicated his intention to contain the gunman. Sergeant Guthrie could see the gunman inside the house and became concerned that he might soon move as he had blackened his face and taken up a backpack. The Sergeant reported the gunman breaking windows and endeavouring to throw what appeared to be an incendiary device into the house. After spending some time moving about his property, the gunman moved towards a Constable's position. Sergeant Guthrie reported his concern that he had lost sight of the gunman and warned the Detective to advise staff to be on the alert. A Constable had now sighted the gunman approaching him and issued a challenge, the gunman retreated in haste passing to the rear of his property.

Due to lack of communication Sergeant Guthrie was unaware of this movement. Sergeant Guthrie had taken cover in sand dunes at the rear of a crib (seaside cottage) next to the gunman's house when suddenly out of the darkness he was confronted by the gunman.

Sergeant Guthrie very courageously challenged him, saying "Stop ..., stop or I shoot". The Sergeant then discharged a warning shot from his .38 calibre police revolver. The gunman then moved around and down upon the sergeant killing him instantly in a volley of shots. The gunman then took the Sergeant's revolver. Throughout this ordeal Sergeant Guthrie displayed conspicuous courage. His actions in placing himself in danger to protect his staff and members of the public at the cost of his own life were selfless acts of heroism. His bravery and courage were in the highest traditions of the New Zealand Police.
