= Bach (house) =

Small holiday home located near beaches

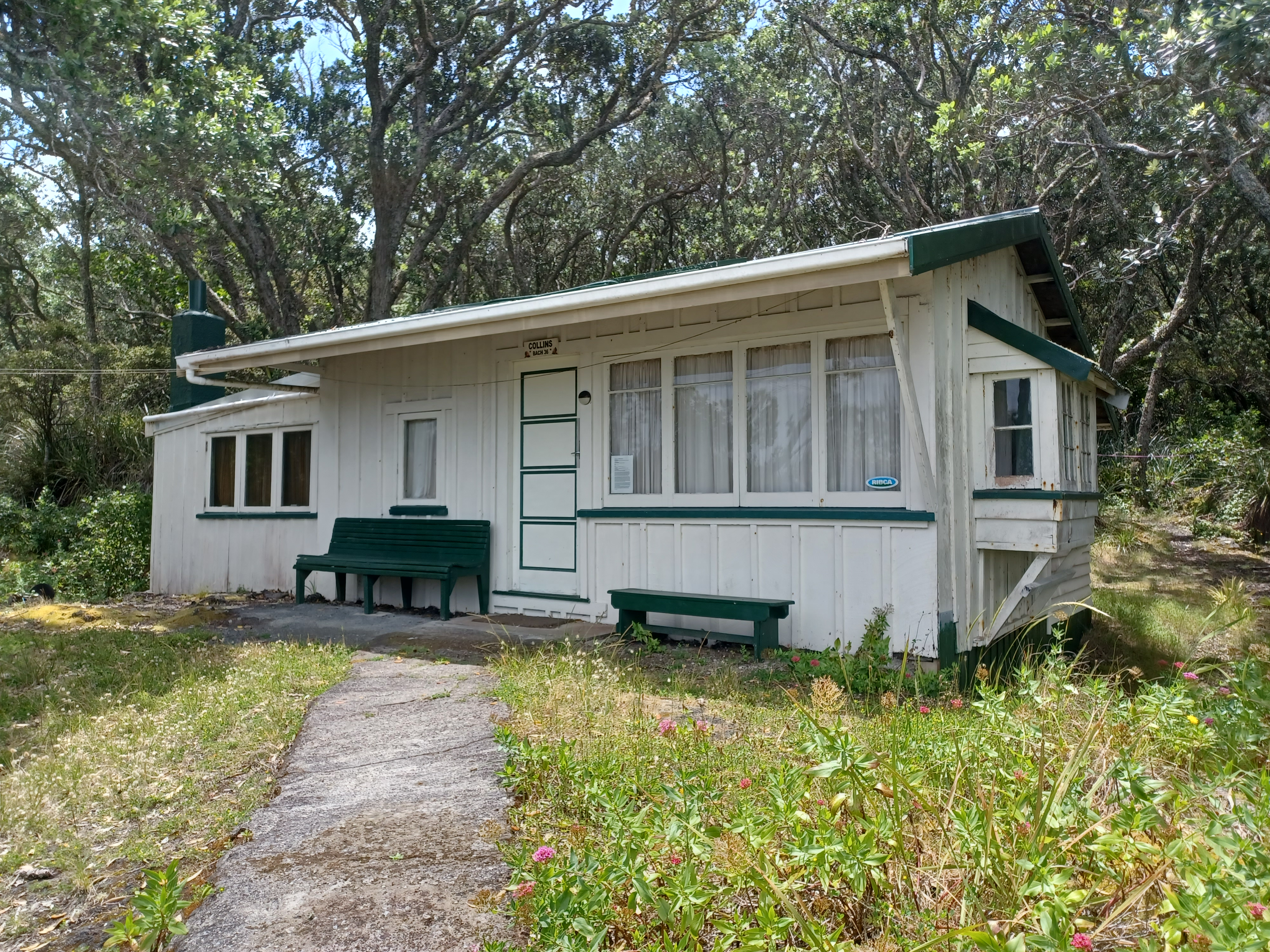
A historic bach on Rangitoto Island

A bach (pronounced /ˈbætʃ/), also called a crib in the southern half of the South Island, is a small, often modest holiday home or beach house in New Zealand. Baches are an iconic part of the country's history and culture. In the middle of the 20th century, they symbolised the beach holiday lifestyle that was becoming more accessible to the middle class.

Baches began to gain popularity in the 1950s as roads improved and the increasing availability of cars allowed for middle-class beach holidays, often to the same beach every year. With yearly return trips being made, baches began to spring up in many family vacation spots.

== Etymology ==
Bach was for some time thought to be short for bachelor pad, but they tended to be family holiday homes. An alternative theory for the origin of the word is that bach is the Welsh word for 'small' and 'little'. The phrase Tŷ Bach (outhouse; literally 'small house') is used for outbuildings. Sizeable populations of Welsh miners relocated to New Zealand during mining booms.

== Construction ==
=== Post-World War II ===
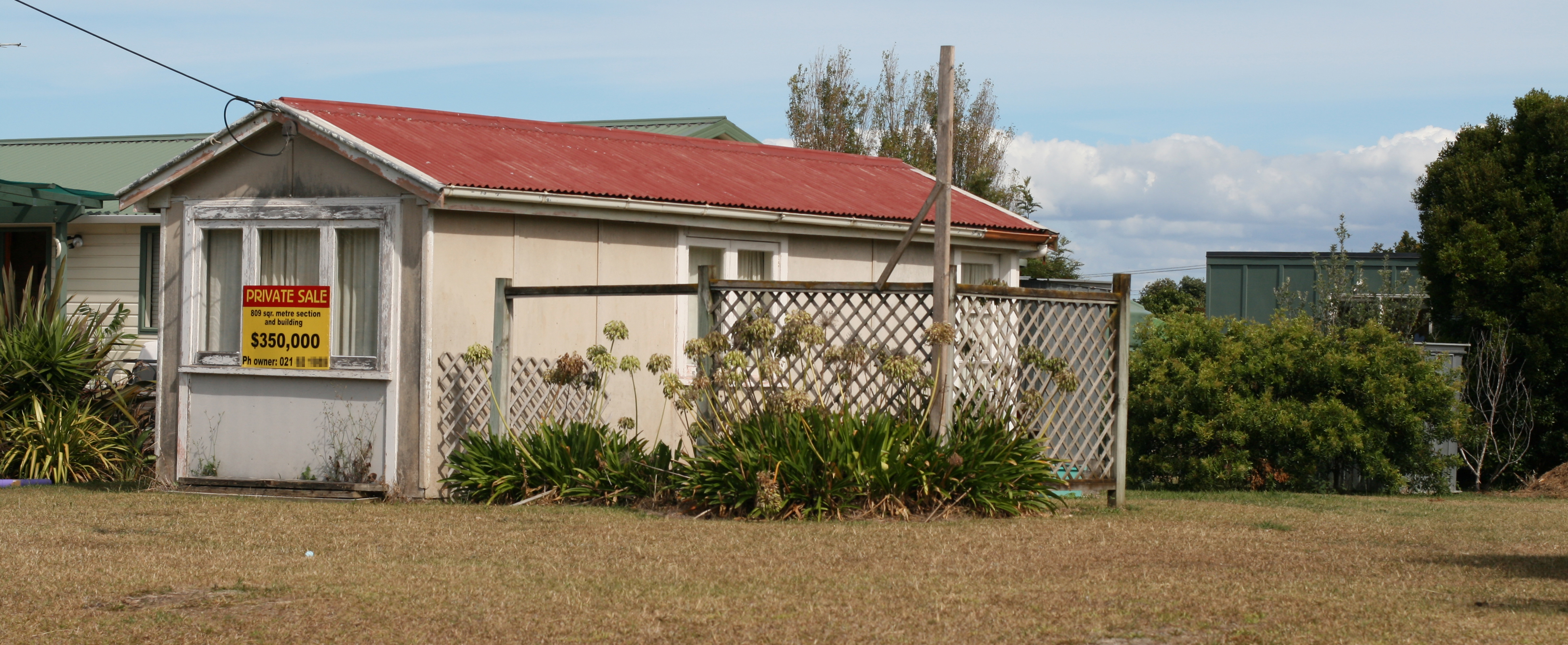
Waiheke Island bach destined to be replaced with a 21st-century holiday home, March 2007

They are almost always small structures, usually made of cheap or recycled material like fibrolite (asbestos cement sheet), corrugated iron, or used timber. They were influenced by the backwoods cabins and sheds of the early settlers and farmers. Other baches used a caravan as the core of the structure and built extensions onto it. Many cities were dismantling tram systems in the 1950s, and old trams were sometimes used as baches, most noticeably on the coast of the Coromandel Peninsula on the Firth of Thames, to which more than 100 trams were relocated.

A reconstructed example of a typical bach from the 1950s can be found in the New Zealand Maritime Museum on Princes Wharf in central Auckland. The period-furnished bach is complemented with an adjacent beach shop with original products from that time.

While older baches tend to be fibrolite lean-to structures, modern kit-set buildings are becoming popular among bach owners. Some figures estimate that more than 50,000 baches exist around New Zealand (population 5.3 million people).

=== Recent times ===
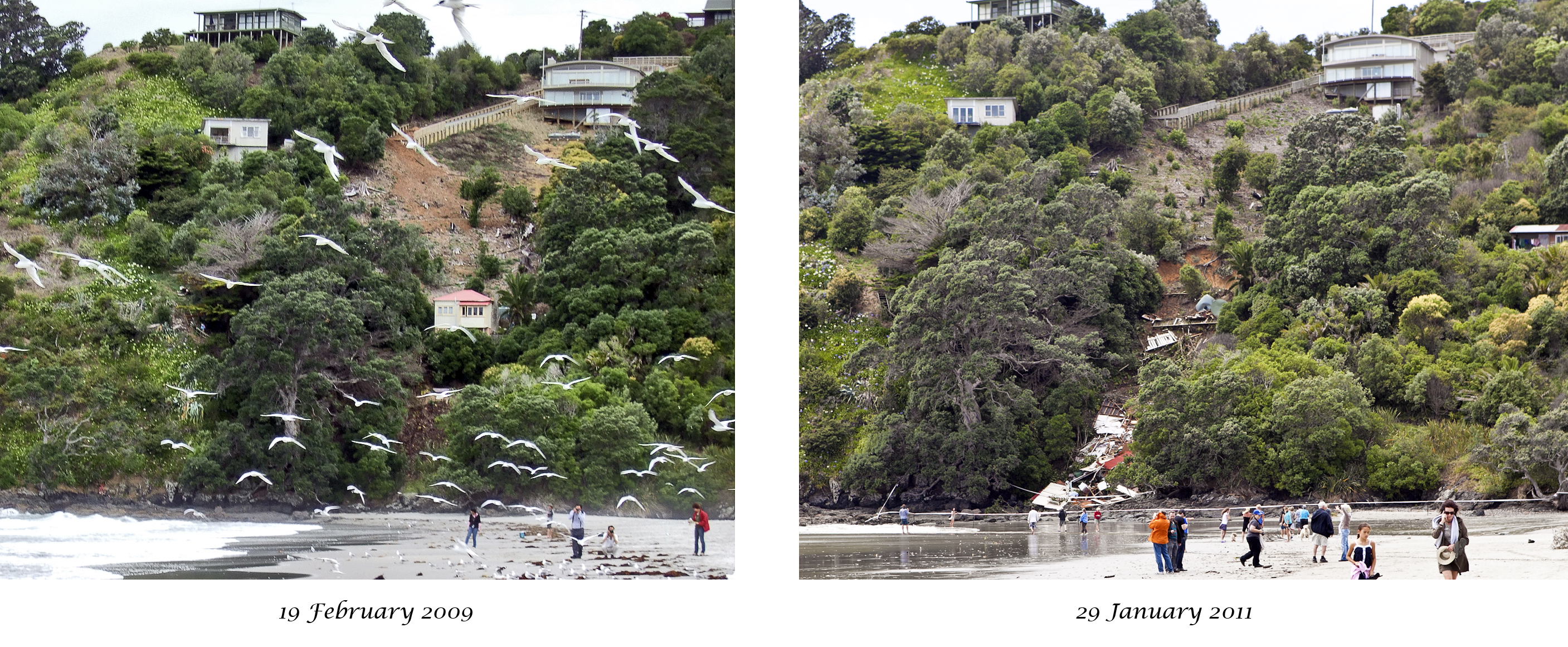
Bach above Onetangi Beach, Waiheke Isaland, stood for decades, destroyed in seconds when saturated land gave way (11 January 2011)

Early baches rarely enjoyed amenities like connections to the water and electricity grid or indoor toilets. They were simply furnished, often with secondhand furniture.

In more recent times the basic bach has been replaced by the modern "holiday house", which is more substantial, more expensive (reflecting increases in affluence, and vastly increased coastal land values) and usually professionally built (due to stricter building codes). Another important change has been the subdivision of coastal land, bringing increasing numbers of residents and visitors, along with traffic, cafes, mobile phone coverage, craft shops, and other conveniences, to what were originally empty beaches and bush-filled gullies. Some bach-dotted beaches of the 1950s have today become suburban areas flourishing with life and new culture.

=== Comparison with cabins ===
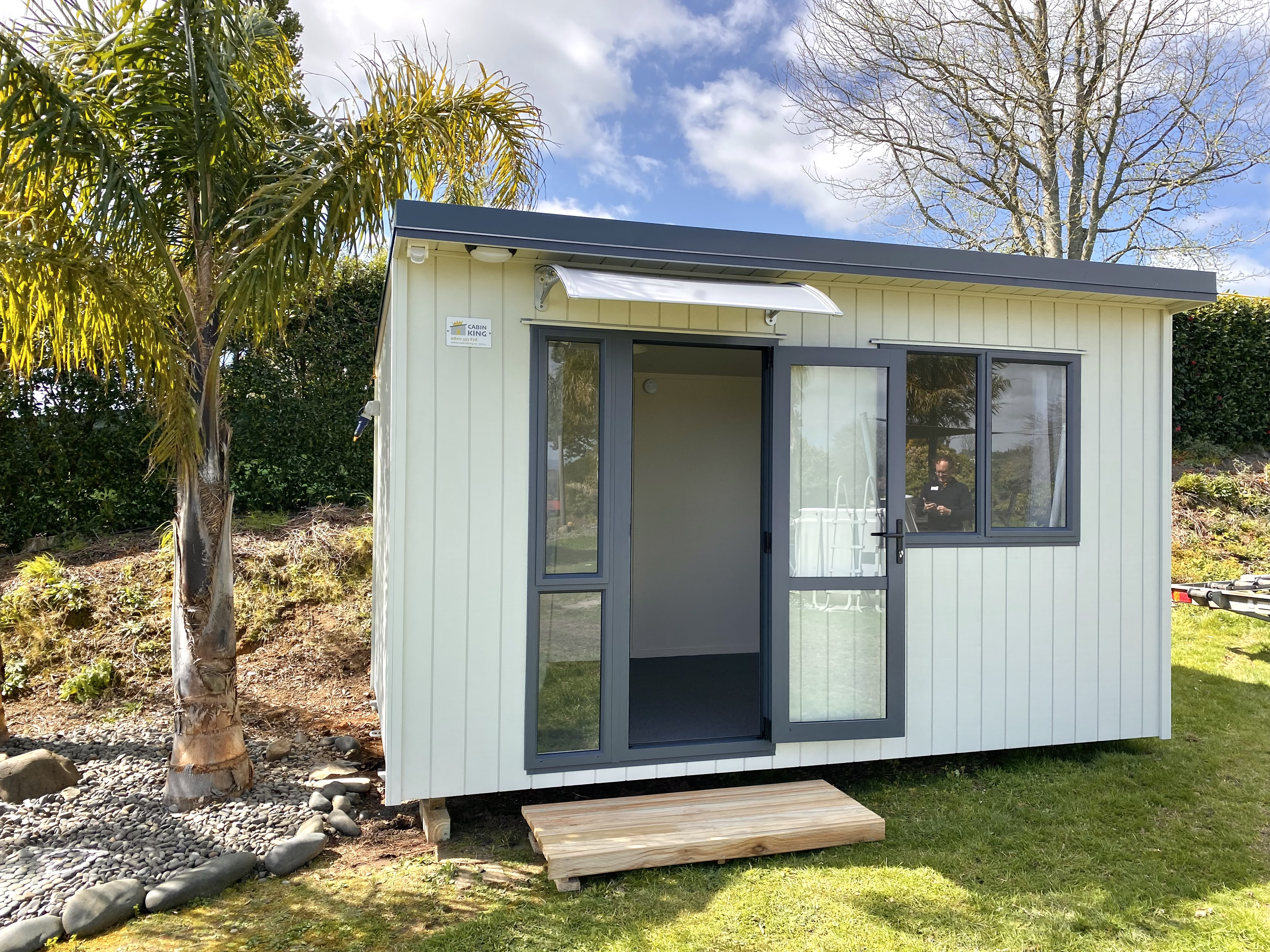
A Cabin in New Zealand

In New Zealand, a cabin refers to a specific category of small, prefabricated, transportable single-room buildings. The New Zealand cabin is characterised by its use as supplementary residential housing (a "sleepout") or work-from-home office space. A cabin will not be plumbed but will have electricity and be subjected to local building regulations.

== Legal status ==
Old baches often have "existing use" rights under the 1991 Resource Management Act in areas where newer planning regulations would not allow even such modest residential or part-time residential buildings. As such they are quite prized, even though authorities typically look unfavourably on proposals to convert them into full residential buildings.

== See also ==
- Dacha
