= Omar Nabhan =

Member of al-Shabaab (1998–2013)

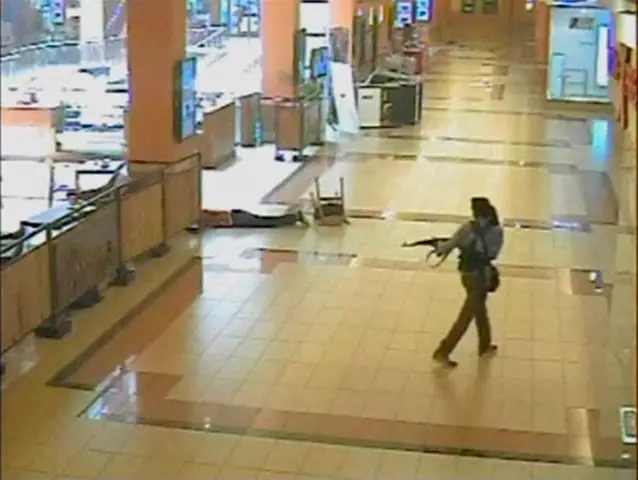
- Nabhan, as seen inside of the mall during the shooting. A victim can be seen laying on the floor to his left
- Born: 1998
- Died: 21 September 2013 (aged 14–15); Westgate shopping mall, Nairobi, Kenya
- Body discovered: 24 September 2013
- Organization: Al-Shabaab
- Known for: Westgate shopping mall attack
- Motive: Islamic terrorism

Details
- Locations: Westgate shopping mall, Nairobi, Kenya
- Killed: 62 direct; 1 indirect
- Injured: 161 direct; 2 indirect
- Weapons: AK-47 rifle, grenades, suicide belt

Yahya Ahmed Osman (1998–21 September 2013), also known by his nom de guerre Omar Nabhan, was a Somali mass murderer and al-Shabaab militant who was one of four perpetrators of the 2013 Westgate shopping mall attack that killed 67 people and injured a further 173. He was killed during the attack.

== Life ==
He was born in 1998. Another militant stated that Nabhan trained and graduated from an Al-Shabaab training camp in the town of Balad in 2009.

== Attack ==
On 21 September 2013, Nabhan and three other heavily armed men drove to the front entrance of the Westgate shopping mall in Nairobi, Kenya. The four men split into pairs, and Nabhan went with Hassan Abdi Dhuhulow into the mall, where they immediately began to shoot at shoppers in their vicinity. Dhuhulow entered a restaurant where three died, while Nabhan entered a children's shoe store adjacent to it. He fired six bullets into a man, killing him. He fired at victims near Barclays Bank before joining Dhuhulow in the Nakumatt supermarket, where Nabhan and others were captured on CCTV shooting at civilians. The men, including Nabhan, stayed in the supermarket for the rest of the shooting. All four men were later killed.

== See also ==
- Omar Mateen, an American mass murderer
