= Afetsi Awoonor =

Ghanaian politician and oil and gas executive

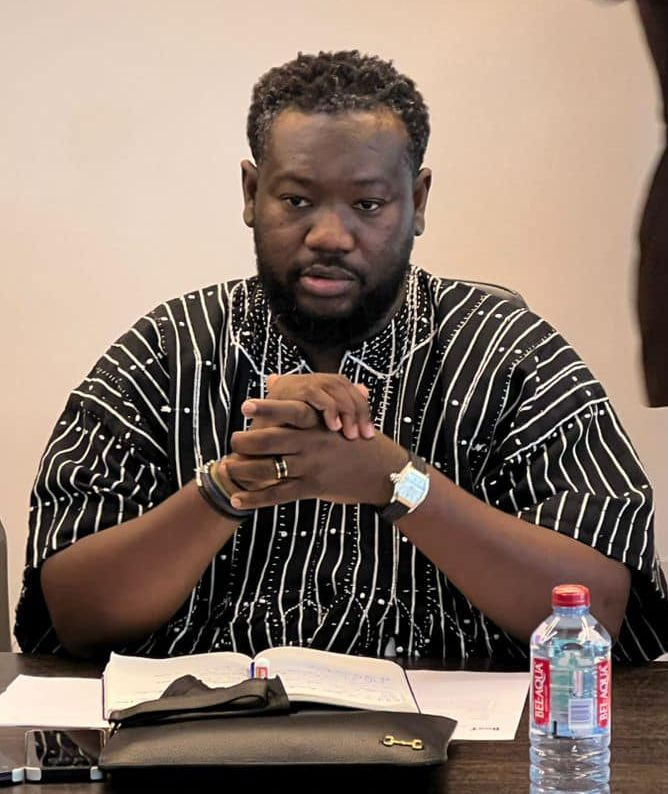
- Born: August 31, 1982 (age 44); Accra
- Education: Central University (Ghana) (BSc., Business Administration), Geneva Graduate Institute (Executive masters, International Oil & Gas Leadership, Energy Management and Systems), IFP School (Masters, Oil and Gas management)
- Occupations: Oil & Gas executive, politician
- Known for: Managing director, BOST Energies
- Political party: National Democratic Congress (Ghana)
- Board member of: Ghana Oil Company
- Spouse: Adaku Ufere-Awoonor
- Father: Kofi Awoonor

Afetsi Awoonor (born 31 August 1982) is a Ghanaian oil and gas leader, business executive and politician who serves as the managing director of the state-owned Bost Energies since January 2025.

== Early life and education ==
Afetsi Awoonor was born on 31 August 1982 in Accra, Ghana. He is a son of the late Prof. Kofi Awoonor, the Ghanaian poet and former diplomat. His mother is Margaret Oduro. As his father was a diplomat, Afetsi spent his formative years in the United States, Brazil, Cuba and Ghana.

He graduated with his first degree in Business Administration from Central University in 2010. In 2015, he graduated with a master's degree from the IFP School in France. He also earned an Executive master's degree in International Oil and Gas Leadership from the Geneva Graduate Institute.

== Career and politics ==
Afetsi Awoonor is a member of the National Democratic Congress (NDC).

In January 2025, President John Mahama appointed Afetsi Awoonor as the managing director of Ghana's BOST Energies. He was also appointed to the governing board of Ghana Oil in March 2025.

From April 2017 to January 2024, Afetsi worked as the Regional Head of Sales and Marketing at Convenio Energy.

== Westgate Mall Attack ==
On 21 September 2013, Afetsi Awoonor and his father, Kofi Awoonor, became victims of the Westgate shopping mall attack carried out by Al-Shabaab, Kenya. His father died in the attack while he survived despite two gunshots to the back.

They were in the country for the Storymoja Hay Festival, a literary event where his father was scheduled to perform.

== Personal life ==
Afetsi Awoonor is married to Adaku Ufere-Awoonor, a Nigerian energy expert and attorney. The couple is blessed with two children.

== Philanthropy ==
Afetsi Awoonor founded the Afetsi Awoonor Foundation which supports development and social-impact projects in his native Volta Region and beyond.
