= Kofi Anyidoho =

Ghanaian poet and academic (born 1947)

- Born: 25 July 1947 (age 79); Wheta, Volta Region, Ghana
- Education: University of Ghana; Indiana University Bloomington; University of Texas
- Occupations: Poet and academic
- Organisation: University of Ghana

Kofi Anyidoho (born 25 July 1947) is a Ghanaian poet and academic who comes from a family tradition of Ewe poets and oral artists. He is currently a Professor of Literature at the University of Ghana.

He has received numerous awards for his poetry, including the Valco Fund Literary Award, the Langston Hughes Prize, the BBC Arts and Africa Poetry Award, the Fania Kruger Fellowship for Poetry of Social Vision, Poet of the Year (Ghana), and the Ghana Book Award.

== Biography ==
Born in Wheta, in Ghana's Volta Region, Anyidoho was educated in Ghana and the USA, and holds a B.A. Honours degree in English & Linguistics from the University of Ghana, Legon, an M.A. in Folklore from Indiana University Bloomington and gained his PhD in Comparative Literature at the University of Texas at Austin.

Having trained as a teacher at Accra Training College and at the Advanced Teacher Training College-Winneba, he taught primary, middle and secondary school, before joining the University of Ghana-Legon. Currently the Professor of Literature in the English Department, he has also been Director of the CODESRIA African Humanities Institute Program, acting Director of the School of Performing Arts and Head of the English Department. He was installed as the first occupant of the Kwame Nkrumah Chair in African Studies at the University of Ghana on 18 March 2010.

== Poetry ==
Kofi Anyidoho's poetry is noted for its distinctive approach of blending modern themes with traditional elements. It draws upon the three-chord structure of Ewe oral tradition to inspire hope. He not only writes with the background of Ewe oral tradition experiences but also enacts the very performance and oration of his poems in griotic style.

- Elegy for the Revolution (1978)
- A Harvest of Our Dreams (1985), Heinemann (paperback 1998), ISBN 0-435-90261-X
- Earthchild (1985), Woeli Publishing, ISBN 9964-970-72-2
- Ancestral Logic and Caribbean Blues (1992), Africa World Press, ISBN 0-86543-265-1
- Praise Song for the Land: Poems of Hope & Love & Care (2002). Foreword by Kofi Awoonor
- The Place We Call Home and Other Poems (2011)

== Writing ==
Anyidoho's academic writing includes:

- The Pan African Ideal in Literatures of the Black World, Accra: Ghana Universities Press, 1989
- Transcending Boundaries: the diaspora experience in African heritage literatures, Evanston: Northwestern University, 1995
- The Word Behind Bars and the Paradox of Exile, Northwestern University Press (1997), ISBN 0-8101-1393-7
- Kofi Anyidoho and James Gibbs (eds), Fontomfrom. Contemporary Ghanaian Literature, Theatre and Film, Editions Rodopi B.V. (2000), ISBN 90-420-1273-0
- Poetry as Dramatic Performance in Tejumola Olaniyan and Ato Quayson's African Literature: An Anthology of Criticism and Theory
