= Weta (disambiguation) =

Wētā is a common name for a group of about 70 species of insects endemic to New Zealand, mostly in the family Anostostomatidae.

Weta, Wetas, wētā or WETA may also refer to:

== Places ==
- Weta, Ghana, a village in Volta Region, Ghana, also known as Wheta
- Weta, South Dakota, an unincorporated community in Jackson County, South Dakota, United States

== Media ==
- WETA (FM), a radio station licensed to Washington, D.C., United States
- WETA-TV, a television station licensed to Washington, D.C., United States
- Wētā FX, a digital visual effects company (formerly known as Weta Digital)
- Wētā Workshop, a special effects and prop company

== Transportation and vehicles ==
- Wētā Trimaran, a dinghy
- Weta ferry, San Francisco Bay, California, USA
- San Francisco Bay Area Water Emergency Transportation Authority

== Other uses ==
- Weta (genus), in the family Rhaphidophoridae; an obsolete name for the genus Pleioplectron
- Weta (band) (1995–2001), a New Zealand rock band
