= Nathan Amanquah =

Ghanaian engineer

Nathan Amanquah (born 1973) is an engineer, a software developer and educator who is currently dean of engineering and the inaugural Patrick Awuah Professorial Chair at Ashesi University. He was the acting dean of academic affairs at Ashesi University in 2010 when he filled in for Nana Araba Apt in her absence. Before he joined Ashesi University as an assistant professor in 2004, he worked as a systems analyst at The Bulk Oil Storage and Transportation Company Limited (BOST) Ghana, a communications engineer at SSB Bank, Ghana, and electronics instructor at Accra Polytechnic. Amanquah has contributed massively to the design and development of the computer science and engineering programs at Ashesi University. Amanquah together with G. Ayorkor Mills-Tettey and two others in collaboration with a visiting professor from Carnegie Mellon University, Institute of Robotics, designed and taught the first introductory robotics course in Ghana at Ashesi University during summer 2006. He holds membership with Institution of Electronic & Electrical Engineers (IEEE), Ghana Institution of Engineers (GhIE) and a current Ghana board member for Worldreader Organization. Amanquah and Selasi Agbemenu organized the first-ever African Workshop on Emerging Trends in Circuits and Systems (WETCaS) IEEE at Kwame Nkrumah University of Science and Technology, Ghana in November 2017.
