= Lars Akerhaug =

Norwegian journalist and non-fiction author (1981–2025)

Lars Akerhaug, image

Lars Akerhaug (24 October 1981 – 22 July 2025) was a Norwegian journalist and non-fiction author. He was previously a journalist for Verdens Gang, Aftenposten, and Dagen, and wrote for the periodical Minerva with a focus on Islam and as a freelancer.

Akerhaug authored the investigative journalism books Norsk jihad (Norwegian jihad; 2013) about Norwegian Islamists, and En norsk terrorist (A Norwegian terrorist; 2015) about Hassan Abdi Dhuhulow, the Norwegian perpetrator of the 2013 Westgate shopping mall attack in Kenya. Both books received good reviews in Dagbladet. He was granted kr 100.000 from Fritt Ord for development of the book Siste jul i Kairo (Last Christmas in Cairo; 2016), about the persecution of Christians in the Middle East. Akerhaug was considered an expert on Islamic extremism.

Having publicly confronted his own past as a radical leftist and former member of the Workers' Communist Party (AKP) who once represented the Red Electoral Alliance (RV) in the Bærum municipal council, Akerhaug also produced criticism of contemporary leftism.

He became editorial chief of the far-right online newspaper Resett from 2019 to 2021, but after departing strongly distanced himself from the website.

After departing Resett, he became a journalist for the local newspaper Raumnes, and also wrote for the multicultural newspaper Utrop.

Akerhaug died on 22 July 2025, at the age of 44.

== Published books ==
- 2013: Norsk jihad: muslimske ekstremister blant oss. Kagge. ISBN 9788248914457
- 2015: En norsk terrorist: portrett av den nye ekstremismen. Kagge. ISBN 9788248916666
- 2016: Siste jul i Kairo: fortellingen om Midtøstens siste kristne. Dreyer. ISBN 9788282651615
