= Dominic Troulan =

British former military officer (born 1962)

- Born: 12 December 1962 (age 63); Banbury, Oxfordshire
- Military career
- Allegiance: United Kingdom
- Branch: Royal Marines; British Army
- Service years: 1979–2009
- Rank: Major
- Units: 42 Commando; Parachute Regiment
- Conflicts: Falklands War; The Troubles; Iraq War
- Awards: George Cross; Queen's Gallantry Medal; Queen's Commendation for Valuable Service
- Other work: Security consultant

Dominic Charles Rupert Troulan, GC, QGM (born 12 December 1962) is a British security consultant and former military officer. Serving in the Royal Marines and British Army for three decades, he retired from the British military in 2009 at the rank of major. Troulan was awarded the George Cross on 16 June 2017 for his actions during the 2013 Westgate shopping mall attack in Kenya, becoming was the first civilian recipient of the award in 25 years.

== Early life ==
Dominic Charles Rupert Troulan was born in Oxfordshire market town of Banbury on 12 December 1962.

== Military career ==
Troulan enlisted in the Royal Marines in June 1979 and fought in the 1982 Falklands War in 42 Commando. He subsequently served in Northern Ireland during the Troubles and was decorated on two separate tours of service. As a Royal Marine sergeant Troulan was awarded the Queen's Gallantry Medal for his "gallant and distinguished services in Northern Ireland" in 1993. He transferred to the British Army's Parachute Regiment in 1998 and received a temporary commission as captain on 15 April 2002. Troulan was awarded a Queen's Commendation for Valuable Service on 29 April 2003 for a 2002 tour of service in Northern Ireland, by which time Troulan held the substantive rank of warrant officer class one. He was granted an intermediate regular commission as captain on 1 January 2005 and was promoted to major on 31 July 2008. He retired from the military on 31 August 2009 and entered the reserve of officers on the same day.

== Westgate shopping mall attack ==
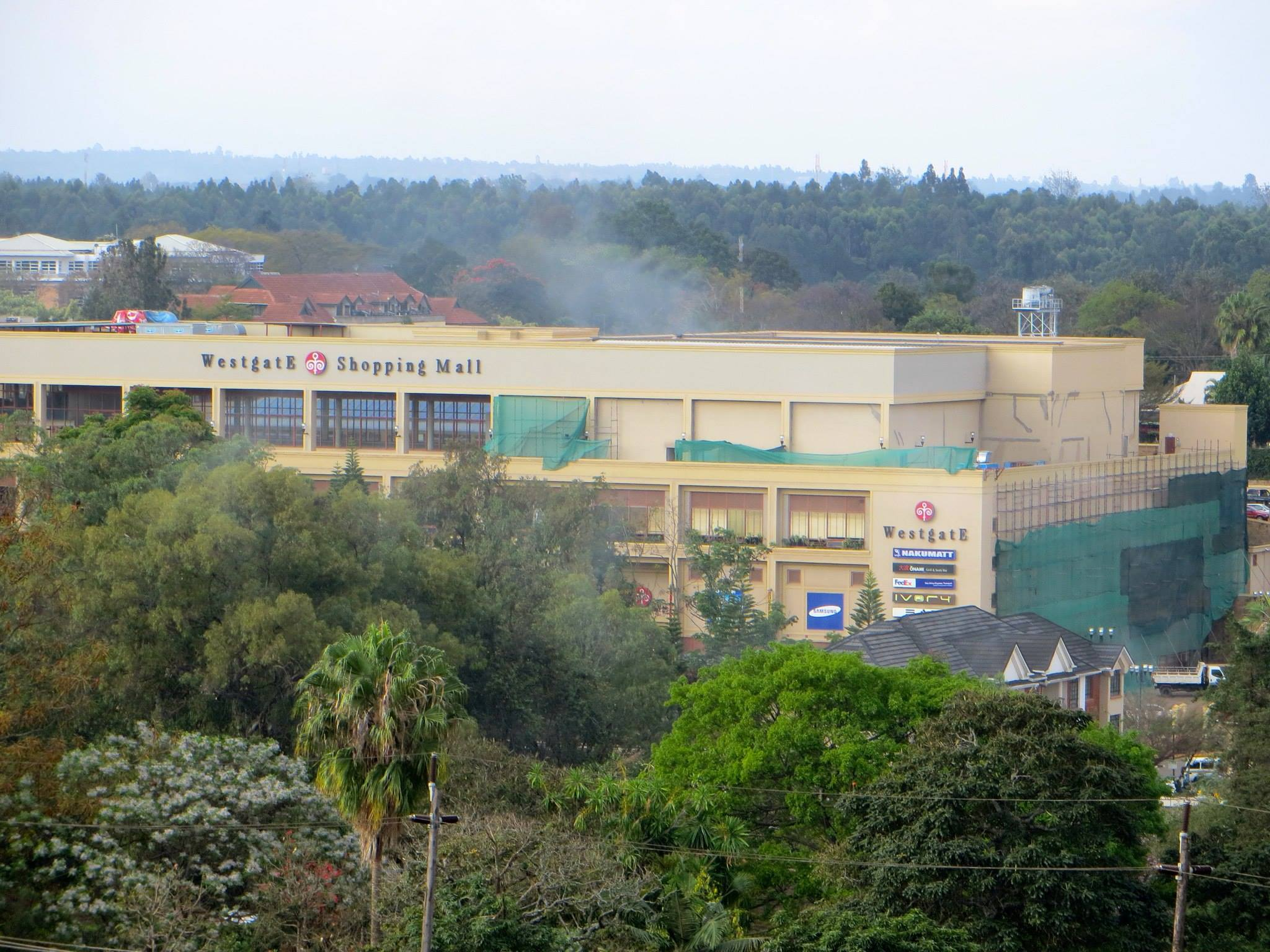
Smoke rising above the Westgate Shopping Mall during the 2013 attack; Troulan helped lead civilians to safety during the incident.

On 21 September 2013 four al-Shabaab militants attacked the Westgate Shopping Mall in Nairobi, Kenya. Troulan was present in the area and helped lead civilians to safety; realising that militants could be posing as civilians, he enlisted help in searching those he escorted to determine their true identity. For Troulan's actions he was awarded the George Cross, the first time in 25 years the award was given to a civilian after the New Zealand Police sergeant Stewart Guthrie was posthumously awarded the George Cross in 1992. Troulan represented the George Cross' recipients at the coronation of Charles III and Camilla on 6 May 2023. Troulan is a trustee of the Victoria Cross and George Cross Association and currently works as a security consultant.
