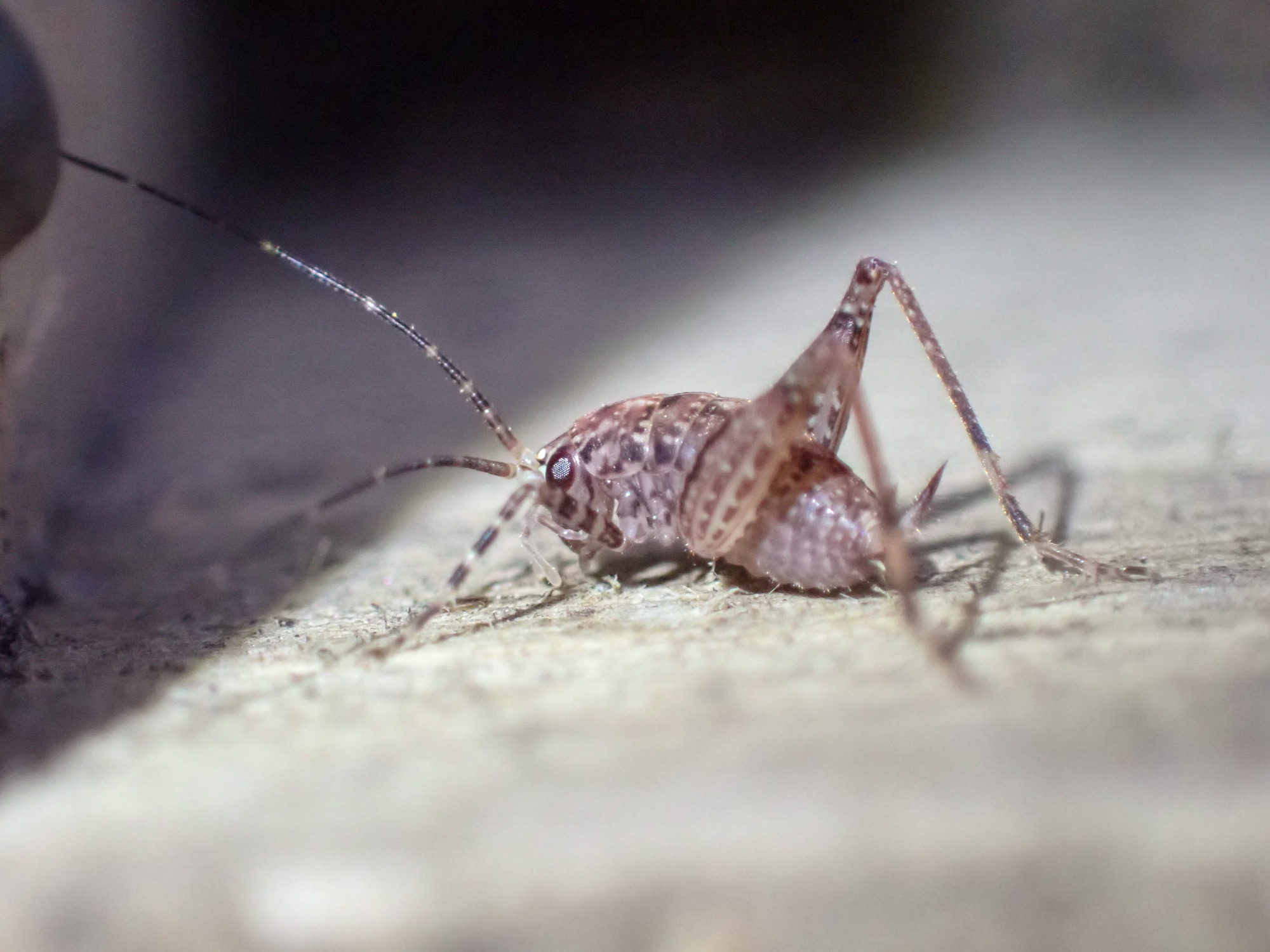
- Pleioplectron auratum in Kaipūpū Sanctuary

Scientific classification
- Kingdom: Animalia
- Phylum: Arthropoda
- Class: Insecta
- Order: Orthoptera
- Suborder: Ensifera
- Family: Rhaphidophoridae
- Genus: Pleioplectron
- Species: P. auratum

Binomial name
- Pleioplectron auratum Hegg, Morgan-Richards, and Trewick, 2019

= Pleioplectron auratum =

Species of orthopteran

Pleioplectron auratum is a species of cave wētā, endemic to New Zealand. It is exclusively found in the South Island.

== Description ==
Pleioplectron auratum can be told from other cave wētā from it slightly checkered colour, the dorsal line down the back, and longer spins a third of the way up the back tibia. Close views of the terminalia are useful for identifying the species further.

== Distribution and habitat ==
Pleioplectron auratum is known from the northeastern part of the South Island of New Zealand. It can be found near firewood stacks in near rivers, as well as in natural hollows.

== Etymology ==
Auratum means 'golden', and refers to "the fine golden hair that adorns the posterior margins of the insect’s tergites."
