= George Cross =

Award for bravery in the British honours system

- Obverse of the cross. Ribbon: 1½", dark blue
- Type: Civil And Military Decoration
- Awarded for: "... acts of the greatest heroism or of the most conspicuous courage in circumstances of extreme danger."
- Description: Height 48 mm, max. width 45 mm; (Obverse) plain silver cross with circular medallion in the centre depicting the effigy of St George and the Dragon, surrounded by the words "FOR GALLANTRY". In the angle of each limb is the Royal Cypher GVI; (Reverse) plain, centre engraved with name of recipient and date of award. Cross attached by ring to bar ornamented with laurel leaves, through which the ribbon passes.
- Presented by: Monarch of the United Kingdom
- Eligibility: Commonwealth subjects
- Post-nominals: GC
- Status: Currently awarded
- Established: 24 September 1940

Highlights
- Total: 416 (including 3 collective awards)
- Total awarded posthumously: 90 (including 5 former EGM recipients)
- Total recipients: 416 (including 3 collective awards)
- GC ribbon bar

Order of Wear
- Next (higher): Victoria Cross (Equal in stature)
- Next (lower): Order of the Garter
- Related: George Medal and King's Gallantry Medal

The George Cross (GC) is the highest British award for non-operational gallantry or gallantry not in the presence of an enemy. In the British honours system, the GC, since its introduction in 1940, has been equal in stature to the Victoria Cross, the highest military award for valour. It is awarded for "acts of the greatest heroism or of the most conspicuous courage in circumstances of extreme danger", not in the presence of the enemy, to members of the British Armed Forces and to British civilians. Posthumous awards have been allowed since it was instituted.

Since the Second World War, most Commonwealth countries have created their own honours systems and no longer recommend British honours. The last GC recommended by a Commonwealth country was by New Zealand for the 1990 posthumous award to Stewart Guthrie for gallantry during the Aramoana massacre. That award was gazetted in 1992.

Although civilians may be awarded the GC, there has been just one civilian recipient since Guthrie: Dominic Troulan, for his actions in the Westgate shopping mall attack in 2013 (gazetted in 2017). There have been eight GC awards to the Royal Marines and British Army since 2000. Many of the awards have been personally presented by the British monarch to recipients or, in the case of posthumous awards, to next of kin. The investitures are usually held at Buckingham Palace.

== Creation ==
The George Cross was announced on 23 September 1940 by King George VI. At this time, days after the climax of the Battle of Britain and during the third week of the Blitz, there was a strong desire to reward the many acts of civilian courage. The existing awards open to civilians were not judged suitable to meet the new situation, therefore it was decided to institute the GC and the George Medal (GM) to recognise civilian gallantry in the face of enemy action, and brave deeds more generally.

Announcing the new award, the King said:

In order that they should be worthily and promptly recognised, I have decided to create, at once, a new mark of honour for men and women in all walks of civilian life. I propose to give my name to this new distinction, which will consist of the George Cross, which will rank next to the Victoria Cross, and the George Medal for wider distribution.

The medal was designed by Percy Metcalfe. The warrants for the GC and for the GM were backdated to 24 September 1940, and published in The London Gazette on 31 January 1941.

The King in his speech announcing the new award, stated that it would rank next to the Victoria Cross. This was second on the Order of Wear, much higher than the then existing awards for bravery not in the presence of the enemy, the highest being the two-class Albert Medal (AM); and the lowest being the single class Empire Gallantry Medal (EGM). In a substitution of awards unprecedented in the history of British decorations, holders of the EGM were required to exchange their insignia for the GC, most receiving their replacement GC at a formal investiture. The four honorary EGM awards to foreigners were not exchanged and could therefore continue to be worn. In 1971, surviving recipients of the Albert Medal and the Edward Medal (EM) became George Cross recipients, but unlike the EGM exchange of insignia, they had the option of retaining their original insignia. Of the 69 holders of the Albert Medal and 70 holders of the Edward Medal eligible to exchange, 49 and 59 respectively took up the option.

== Award ==
The GC, which may be awarded posthumously, is granted in recognition of:

acts of the greatest heroism or of the most conspicuous courage in circumstances of extreme danger.

The award is for civilians but also for military personnel whose actions would not normally be eligible to receive military awards, such as gallantry not in the face of the enemy. The Warrant states:

The Cross is intended primarily for civilians and award in Our military services is to be confined to actions for which purely military Honours are not normally granted.

The Cross shall be worn by recipients on the left breast suspended from a ribbon one and a quarter inches in width, of dark blue, that it shall be worn immediately after the Victoria Cross and in front of the Insignia of all British Orders of Chivalry.

When the Cross is worn by a woman, it may be worn on the left shoulder, suspended from a ribbon fashioned into a bow.

In June 1941 the specification of the ribbon width was amended to one and a half inches.

Bars can be awarded for further acts of bravery meriting the GC, although none have yet been awarded. In common with the Victoria Cross, in undress uniform or on occasions when the medal ribbon alone is worn, a miniature replica of the cross is affixed to the centre of the ribbon, a distinction peculiar to these two premier awards for bravery. In the event of a second award, a second replica would be worn on the ribbon.

Recipients are entitled to the postnominal letters GC.

All original individual GC awards and the latest collective award to the National Health Service have been published in The London Gazette.

== George Cross Committee ==
The George Cross Committee of the Cabinet Office considers cases of military and civilian gallantry. The committee has no formal terms of reference.

== Recipients ==
Since its inception in 1940, the GC has been awarded 416 times: 401 to men, 12 to women, and three times collectively. There have been 165 original awards including the three collective awards, including 106 made before 1947. About 30% of the 162 original awards to individuals have been to civilians. There have been 251 exchange awards, 112 to Empire Gallantry Medal recipients, 69 to Albert Medal recipients and 70 to Edward Medal recipients. Of the 162 individuals who received original awards, 86 have been posthumous. In addition, there were five posthumous recipients of the Empire Gallantry Medal whose awards in four cases were gazetted after the start of the Second World War and whose awards were also exchanged for the GC. All the other exchange recipients were living as of the date of the decisions for the exchanges. Dominic Troulan represented recipients at the 2023 Coronation.

=== Collective awards ===
The flag of Malta displays its George Cross.

The three collective awards have been to the Island of Malta, the Royal Ulster Constabulary (RUC) and the National Health Service of the United Kingdom (NHS).

==== Malta ====
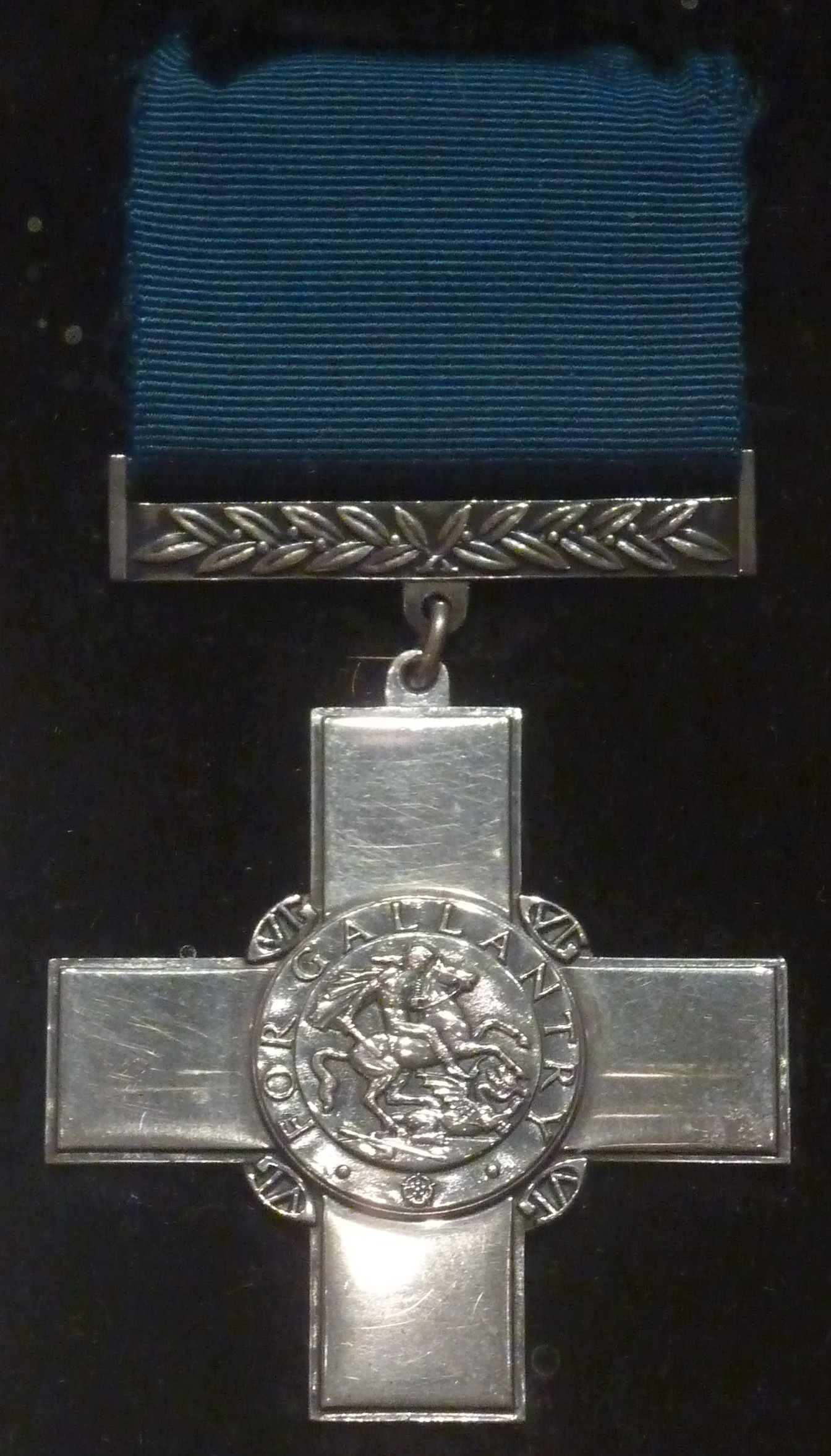
The George Cross awarded to Malta (National War Museum, Malta)

The GC was awarded to the island of Malta in a letter dated 15 April 1942 from King George VI to the island's Governor Lieutenant-General Sir William Dobbie:

To honour her brave people, I award the George Cross to the Island Fortress of Malta to bear witness to a heroism and devotion that will long be famous in history.

The Governor answered:

By God's help Malta will not weaken but will endure until victory is won.

The cross and the messages are today in the War Museum in Fort Saint Elmo, Valletta. The fortitude of the population under sustained enemy air raids, and a naval blockade which almost saw them starved into submission, won widespread admiration in Britain and other Allied nations. Eric Grove argued on the BBC in 2017 that the George Cross was awarded as a propaganda gesture and consequently 'the island of Malta could not be allowed to fall as Singapore had done. Indeed, the North African campaign was being fought in 1942 as much to sustain Malta as vice versa.'

The George Cross was incorporated into the Flag of Malta in 1943 and, since independence in 1964, remains on the flag.

==== Royal Ulster Constabulary ====
The GC was awarded to the RUC in 1999 by Queen Elizabeth II following the advice of the first Blair ministry. The citation published by Buckingham Palace on 23 November 1999 stated:

For the past 30 years, the Royal Ulster Constabulary has been the bulwark against, and the main target of, a sustained and brutal terrorism campaign. The Force has suffered heavily in protecting both sides of the community from danger—302 officers have been killed in the line of duty and thousands more injured, many seriously. Many officers have been ostracised by their own community and others have been forced to leave their homes in the face of threats to them and their families. As Northern Ireland reaches a turning point in its political development this award is made to recognise the collective courage and dedication to duty of all of those who have served in the Royal Ulster Constabulary and who have accepted the danger and stress this has brought to them and to their families.

The Queen presented the George Cross on 12 April 2000 in a ceremony at Hillsborough Castle, County Down, attended by the senior RUC officers; the cross was accepted by Constable Paul Slaine, who had lost both legs in a 1992 IRA attack.

The Police (Northern Ireland) Act 2000 gave effect to much of the Patten Report, with "the Police Service of Northern Ireland (incorporating the Royal Ulster Constabulary)" established on 4 November 2001. The RUC is often referred to as "RUC GC"; the 2000 act established a registered charity "to be known as 'The Royal Ulster Constabulary GC Foundation' for the purpose of marking the sacrifices and honouring the achievements of the Royal Ulster Constabulary"; other instances include the names of the RUC GC Widows' Association, RUC GC Historical Society, and RUCGC–PSNI Benevolent Fund.

==== National Health Service ====
On 5 July 2021, on the 73rd anniversary of the founding of the NHS of the UK, Queen Elizabeth II announced in a personal handwritten message that the four NHS organisations of the United Kingdom would be awarded the George Cross. It was reported that the award was recommended by the Prime Minister, Boris Johnson. The conferral of the award followed an 18-month period in which the health service had been at the forefront of the fight against the coronavirus pandemic in the UK.

The message read:

It is with great pleasure, on behalf of a grateful nation, that I award the George Cross to the National Health Services of the United Kingdom. This award recognises all NHS staff, past and present, across all disciplines and all four nations. Over more than seven decades, and especially in recent times, you have supported the people of our country with courage, compassion and dedication, demonstrating the highest standards of public service. You have our enduring thanks and heartfelt appreciation. Elizabeth R.

=== Awards to the Commonwealth ===
==== Canada ====
There have been 10 GCs awarded to Canadians including those by substitution for awards superseded by the GC. The recipients comprised nine men and one woman. The GC is no longer awarded to Canadians by the King of Canada, who awards the Canadian Cross of Valour instead.

==== Australia ====
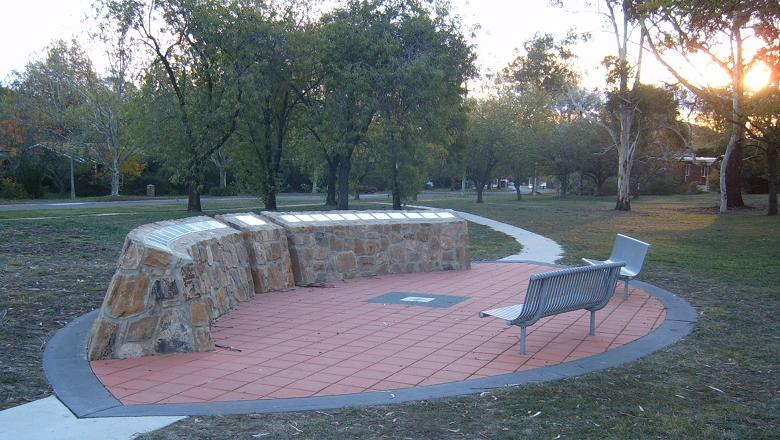
Memorial to Australian recipients, George Cross Park, Canberra

The George Cross was awarded to 23 Australians, 11 to the Australian forces and 12 to civilians. It is the highest decoration of the Australian honours system after the British Victoria Cross and the Victoria Cross for Australia. Although Australia established the Cross of Valour within the Australian honours system in 1975 'for acts of the most conspicuous courage in circumstances of extreme peril' it was not until 1992 that Australia officially ceased recommending British honours. During the period 1975 to 1992, the last George Cross to an Australian was awarded in 1978.

Of the 23 awards, 14 were direct awards and nine were Empire Gallantry Medal (two), Albert Medal (six) and Edward Medal (one) exchange awards. Four awards were to officers of the Royal Australian Naval Volunteer Reserve who served in the extremely dangerous role of mine disposal during the Second World War. Privates Benjamin Gower Hardy and Ralph Jones were posthumously awarded the George Cross for manning a Vickers machine gun during the Cowra breakout, a mass escape by Japanese prisoners of war in central New South Wales on 5 August 1944. Hardy and Jones disabled the weapon and denied its use to the escaping prisoners before they were overwhelmed and killed by the escapees. Courage of a different sort was displayed by two prisoners of war who endured terrible suffering. Captain Lionel Colin Matthews was eventually executed by his captors for building a resistance network in British North Borneo in the Second World War, while Private Horace William Madden, captured in Korea in 1951, died of privations while assisting fellow prisoners and openly resisting enemy efforts to force him to collaborate. The last Australian to be awarded the GC (in 1978) was Constable Michael Kenneth Pratt of the Victoria Police, Melbourne, for arresting two armed bank robbers in June 1976. For 39 years until the award to Dominic Troulon in 2017, Pratt was the most recent living civilian George Cross recipient.

A memorial to Australian recipients, George Cross Park, was opened in Canberra, the Australian capital, on 4 April 2001 by the Governor General of Australia, Sir William Deane.

==== New Zealand ====
In 1999, the New Zealand Cross replaced the role of the George Cross. Up until then, the last George Cross awarded to a New Zealander, was posthumously awarded to Sgt Stewart Guthrie of the New Zealand Police for his actions and bravery during the Aramoana massacre.

== Annuity ==
Holders of the Victoria Cross or the George Cross are entitled to an annuity, the amount of which is determined by the awarding government. As of 2015, the annuity paid by the British government was £10,000. In Canada under the Gallantry Awards Order, members of the Canadian Forces, or people who joined the British forces before 31 March 1949 while domiciled in Canada or Newfoundland, receive $3,000 per year. Australia has been responsible for the payment of both the Victoria Cross Allowance and the George Cross annuity since the 1940s. The Victoria Cross Allowance which includes both the Victoria Cross for Australia and the British Victoria Cross is included in s.103 of the Veterans' Entitlement Act and is presently $A4,447 per year. Although there is not a statutory instrument for the payment of the George Cross annuity, both annuities for the Australian Cross of Valour and George Cross match the Victoria Cross Allowance payment.

== Restriction of use ==
Since 1943, in accordance with the George Cross (Restriction of Use) Ordinance, it is unlawful in Malta to use the George Cross, an imitation of it or the words George Cross for the purposes of trade or business without the prime minister's authorisation.

== See also ==
- British and Commonwealth orders and decorations
- Recipients of the George Cross
- List of George Cross recipients
- George Medal
- Cross of St. George, a Russian award
- Saint George's Cross, the flag of England
- Flag of Malta, a flag bearing the cross
- Soham rail disaster – 2 June 1944
- The Victoria Cross and George Cross Association
- Elizabeth Cross
- PDSA Gold Medal – seen as the animal equivalent of the GC

== Bibliography ==
- Abbott, P. E.; Tamplin, J.M.A. (1981). British Gallantry Awards. London: Nimrod Dix. ISBN 9780902633742.
- Bisset, I. (1961). The George Cross. MacGibbon & Kee.
- Blanch, Craig (2020). For Gallantry: Australians awarded the George Cross & the Cross of Valour. NewSouth Books. ISBN 978-1-74223-682-7.
- Duckers, Peter (2001). British Gallantry Awards: 1855–2000. Princes Risborough, UK: Shire Publications. ISBN 978-0747805168.
- Hebblethwaite, Marion (2021). George Cross Encyclopedia: Illustrated biographies of all George Cross recipients. Cirencester. ISBN 978-1-9997057-3-2.
- Hissey, Terry (2008). Come if Ye Dare: The Civil Defence George Crosses. Matlock: Civil Defence Association. ISBN 978-0-9550153-2-8.
- Mussell, John (2017). Medal yearbook 2018. Devon: Token Publishing. ISBN 978-1908828385.
- Smyth, John (1968). The Story of the George Cross. London: Barker. ISBN 0-213-76307-9.
- Stanistreet, Allan (1986). 'Gainst All Disaster Gallant Deeds Above and Beyond the Call of Duty. Chippenham: Picton Publishing. ISBN 9780948251160.
- Wright, Christopher J.; Anderson, Glenda M., eds. (2013). The Victoria Cross and the George Cross: the complete history (3 vols). York: Methuen & Co. ISBN 978-0-413-77752-2.
- The Register of the George Cross (2nd ed.). Cheltenham: This England Books. 1990. ISBN 9780906324172.
