= Hassan Abdi Dhuhulow =

Member of al-Shabaab (1990–2013)

- Dhuhulow, as seen inside of a supermarket during the attack.
- Born: 1990; Mogadishu, Somalia
- Died: 22 September 2013 (aged 23); Westgate, Nairobi, Kenya
- Cause of death: Gunshot wounds
- Known for: Westgate shopping mall attack
- Allegiance: Al-Shabaab

Hassan Abdi Dhuhulow (1990 – 22 September 2013) was a Norwegian-Somalian Islamist terrorist and Al-Shabaab-member who was one of four perpetrators of the 2013 Westgate shopping mall attack in Nairobi, Kenya that killed 71 people.

== Early life ==
Dhuhulow came to Norway from Mogadishu, Somalia as a refugee in 1999, settling with what were claimed to be relatives in Larvik. Later, several of the claimed family relations have been exposed as false, including an alleged sister who has been prosecuted for false testimony in connection with the Westgate attack. Dhuhulow and the alleged sister were granted Norwegian citizenship in 2003 on grounds of their family relations. His parents and several other relatives allegedly died or were killed in Somalia.

While described as hot-headed and as having anger issues during his first school years, he had reportedly become a kind and hard-working model student by tenth grade. Although well-liked, he was described by himself and by others as being lonely, and he became very religious as a practicing Muslim who prayed five times a day and started bringing a prayer rug with him during upper secondary school. He regularly attended the Larvik Mosque, where he became acquainted with Mohyeldeen Mohammad.

He was a prolific user on web forums, at times displaying clear jihadist sympathies, including on a site hosted by the Islamic Association with 2,500 comments from 2006 to 2008. His activities, including contacts with central members of Profetens Ummah led him to be brought in for talks with the Norwegian Police Security Service (PST).

== Westgate shopping mall attack ==
Dhuhulow returned to Somalia in 2009, where he got married, staying there except for a brief trip back to Norway in 2010. In 2012 he was arrested, suspected of the murder of radio journalist Hassan Yusuf Absuge in Mogadishu. He was eventually acquitted from the charges, while another member of Al-Shabaab was sentenced to death. Dhuhulow reportedly attended an Al-Shabaab training camp in El Buur, and was involved in operations in Mogadishu and Kismayo, eventually becoming part of a 'martyrdom brigade'.

After the Westgate shopping mall attack in September 2013, it was reported that what appeared to be Dhuhulow was seen firing an AK-47 in CCTV footage, as one of four terrorists affiliated with Al-Shabaab who took part in the attack in which 71 people were killed (including all four terrorists), and almost 200 wounded. Dhuhulow's cell phone traffic suggests he may have been the leader of the terror cell during the attack. His presence at the scene was later confirmed by the Norwegian Police Security Service (PST) following forensic dentistry by the Federal Bureau of Investigation (FBI).

An estimated 20 to 30 Norwegians have reportedly travelled to fight for Al-Shabaab. Al-Shabaab commander Ikrima lived for several years as an asylum seeker in Norway, and is believed by Kenyan intelligence to have masterminded the Westgate attack. The perpetrators of the attack were publicly hailed by Ubaydullah Hussain, spokesperson of the Norwegian Islamist group Profetens Ummah.

Dhuhulow is the subject of the 2015 book En norsk terrorist. Portrett av den nye ekstremismen (A Norwegian terrorist. Portrait of the new extremism) by journalist Lars Akerhaug, who has directed strong criticism towards Norwegian authorities for their failed handling of Dhuhulow and "cowardice" prior to the attack, requesting a fact-finding commission similar to the one after the 2011 Norway attacks, believing that the victims of the Westgate attack deserve an explanation from Norwegian authorities. Researcher Stig Jarle Hansen has voiced similar concerns, holding that the issue of Norwegian Al-Shabaab-fighters is taken too lightly in Norway (the number of fighters is the same as the United Kingdom despite many more Somalis living there). Dhuhulow was the subject of a BBC Newsnight report that aired on 17 October 2013, and of the NRK Brennpunkt documentary Terroristen fra Larvik (The terrorist from Larvik) aired on 21 October 2014. He is considered Norway's worst terrorist after Anders Behring Breivik.

== See also ==
- 2014 Hotel Amalo attack, suicide car bombing by Norway-resident Burhan Ahmed Abdule
