= This Earth, My Brother =

1971 novel by Kofi Awoonor

This Earth, My Brother is a 1971 novel by Ghanaian novelist Kofi Awoonor published. It was later republished by Heinemann as part of the influential African Writers Series.

== Development and context ==
Awoonor started writing the novel in 1963—and it was a "straightforward narrative" which Awoonor compared to works by Conrad and Joyce. Subsequently, Awoonor wrote other sections: original

printing of the novel included two types of printed material: the narrative section, and other sections written after the initial draft. The intermixed narrative strategies radically changed assumptions about what African novels should include.

This earth my brother
- Author: Kofi Awoonor
- Language: English
- Genre: Poetry
- Publisher: Heinemann; First Edition (January 1, 1972)
- Publication date: January 1, 1972
- Publication place: Ghana
- Pages: 183
- ISBN: 978-0435901080

l

In Ghana, this novel echoes many of the obsessive qualities of the author's poems. The story describes the pain of Awoonor's voluntary exile and his spiritual return to his native land.

Academic Kwame Ayivor describes the novel as a fictional representation of the mythology and worldview of the Ewe people. Ayivor describes the style of using this material, as very similar to Ayi Kwei Armah's The Healers (1979).

== Critical reception ==
In an obituary for Awoonor, Ghanaian-British writer Nii Ayikwei Parkes called the novel "wonderfully musical prose, its immersion in Accra's history, its obvious confidence in its place in the world, made me go to my father and ask about the other uncle."
