= Kofi Awoonor =

Ghanaian poet and author (1935–2013)

8th Ghana Permanent Representative to the United Nations
- In office 1990–1994
- President: Jerry Rawlings
- Preceded by: James Victor Gbeho
- Succeeded by: George Lamptey

Personal details
- Born: George Kofi Nyidevu Awoonor-Williams; 13 March 1935 Wheta, Gold Coast, Ghana
- Died: 21 September 2013 (aged 78) Nairobi, Kenya
- Relations: Nii Parkes (nephew)
- Education: University of Ghana; University of London; State University of New York
- Occupation: Poet, author, academic and diplomat

Kofi Awoonor (born George Kofi Nyidevu Awoonor-Williams; 13 March 1935 – 21 September 2013) was a Ghanaian poet, author and diplomat. His work combined the poetic traditions of his native Ewe people with contemporary and religious symbolism to depict Africa during decolonization. He started writing under the name George Awoonor-Williams, and was also published as Kofi Nyidevu Awoonor. He taught African literature at the University of Ghana. Professor Awoonor was among those who were killed in the September 2013 attack at Westgate shopping mall in Nairobi, Kenya, where he was a participant at the Storymoja Hay Festival.

== Early life ==
George Kofi Nyidevu Awoonor-Williams was born in Wheta, in the Volta region of what was then the Gold Coast, present-day Ghana. He was the eldest of 10 children in the family. He was a paternal descendant of the Awoonor-Williams family of Sierra Leone Creole descent. His grandmother was an Ewe dirge singer.

== Education ==
He attended Achimota School and then proceeded to the University of Ghana, graduating in 1960. While at university he wrote his first poetry book, Rediscovery, published in 1964. Like the rest of his work, Rediscovery is rooted in African oral poetry. His early works were inspired by the singing and verse of his native Ewe people, and he later published translations of the work of three Ewe dirge singers (Guardians of the Sacred Word: Ewe Poetry, 1973).

He studied literature at University College London, earning a Master's Degree in 1970. He got his Ph.D. at SUNY at Stony Brook, in New York in 1972.

== Career ==
After graduating in 1960, Awoonor worked as a researcher for the Institute for African Studies and began participating in the pan-African campaigns of Kwame Nkrumah. He was appointed to the Ghana Film Corporation. He helped to found the Ghana Playhouse, where he played the lead role in Wole Soyinka's The Lion and the Jewel. In the 1960s, he edited the literary journal Okyeame and was an associate editor of Transition Magazine.

While in England, he wrote several radio plays for the BBC, and began using the name Kofi Awoonor.

He spent the early 1970s in the United States, studying and teaching at Stony Brook University (then called SUNY at Stony Brook) where he obtained his Ph.D. in 1972. While in the United States he wrote This Earth, My Brother and Night of My Blood, both books published in 1971.

Awoonor returned to Ghana in 1975 as head of the English department at the University of Cape Coast. Within months he was arrested for helping a soldier accused of trying to overthrow the military government and was imprisoned without trial. His sentence was remitted in October 1976. The House by the Sea (1978) is about his time in jail.

Awoonor was Ghana's ambassador to Brazil from 1984 to 1988, before serving as ambassador to Cuba. From 1990 to 1994, Awoonor was Ghana's Permanent Representative to the United Nations, where he headed the committee against apartheid. He was also a former Chairman of the Council of State, the main advisory body to the president of Ghana, serving in that position from 2009 to January 2013.

== Poetry ==
The early poetry of Awoonor borrows from the Ewe oral tradition. Awoonor's poetry is widely recognized for drawing on Ewe oral traditions, which he integrated into modern literary forms. In his critical book Guardians of the Sacred Word and Ewe Poetry, he rendered Ewe poetry in translation (1974). The Breast of the Earth: A Study of the History, Culture, and Literature of Africa South of the Sahara is another work of literary criticism (1975).

== Death ==
On 21 September 2013, Awoonor was among those killed in an attack at the Westgate shopping mall in Nairobi. He was in Kenya as a participant in the Storymoja Hay Festival, a four-day celebration of writing, thinking and storytelling, at which he was due to perform on the evening of his death. His nephew Nii Parkes, who was attending the same literary festival, has written about meeting him for the first time that day. The Ghanaian government confirmed Awoonor's death the next day. His son Afetsi Awoonor, who had accompanied him, was also shot, but was later discharged from hospital.

Awoonor's remains were flown from Nairobi to Accra, Ghana, on 25 September 2013.

His body was cremated and buried at a particular spot in his hometown at Wheta in the Volta Region. Also there was no crying or mourning at his funeral all according to his will before death.

== Works ==
=== Poetry ===
- Rediscovery and Other Poems (Mbari Publications, 1964)
- Night of My Blood (Doubleday, 1971) – poems that explore Awoonor's roots, and the impact of foreign rule in Africa
- Ride Me, Memory (1973)
- The House by the Sea (Greenfield Review Press, 1978)
- Until the Morning After: Selected Poems, 1963–85 (Greenfield Review Press, 1987)
- The Promise of Hope: New and Selected Poems, 1964–2013 (Amalion / University of Nebraska Press, 2014)

=== Novels ===
- This Earth, My Brother (Doubleday, 1971) – a cross between a novel and a poem
- Comes the Voyager at Last: A Tale of Return to Africa (Africa World Press, 1992)

=== Non-fiction ===
- The Breast of the Earth: A Survey of the History, Culture, and Literature of Africa South of the Sahara (Anchor Press, 1975; ISBN 0-385-07053-5)
- The Ghana Revolution: Background Account from a Personal Perspective (1984)
- Ghana: A Political History from Pre-European to Modern Times (Sedco, 1990)
- Africa: The Marginalized Continent (1994)
- The African Predicament: Collected Essays (Sub-Saharan Publishers, 2006; ISBN 9789988550820)

=== As editor or translator ===
- Messages: Poems From Ghana (1971). Eds. Kofi Awoonor & G. Adali-Mortty.
- Guardians of the Sacred Word: Ewe Poetry (1974). Trans. Kofi Awoonor.

=== Poems ===
- The Cathedral
- The Weaver Bird
- Across a New Dawn
- A Call
- On the Gallows Once
- Lament of the Silent Sister
- Had Death Not Had Me in Tears
- Songs of Sorrow
- First Circle
- A Death Foretold

== Understanding and interpreting his works ==
It is said that Awoonor wrote many of his poems as if he were envisioning his own demise. He is a peculiar writer, who strives, almost too hard, to bring his ancestry and culture into his poems, sometimes even borrowing words from the local Ewe dialect. Being such a strong practitioner of the traditional religion meant that he was of a relict species. Especially for one so highly educated, it was an even rarer phenomenon. That awareness, not only that he was a relict specimen as an individual, but that the entire culture was suffering entropy, may have come through his poems in a manner that would suggest at first that he was writing about his mortal end. Besides the personal and cultural lament, Awoonor also shrewdly decried what he would have considered the decadent spectre of Western influences (religions, social organisation and economic philosophy) on the history and fortunes of African people in general. He would lambast the thoughtless exuberance with which Africans themselves embraced such things, and gradually engineered what he would have considered a self-degradation that went far beyond a loss of cultural identity. He would often construct his writings to look at these things through the lens of his own Ewe culture.

Diplomatic posts
Preceded by James Victor Gbeho	Permanent Representative to the United Nations; 1990–1994	Succeeded by George Lamptey
