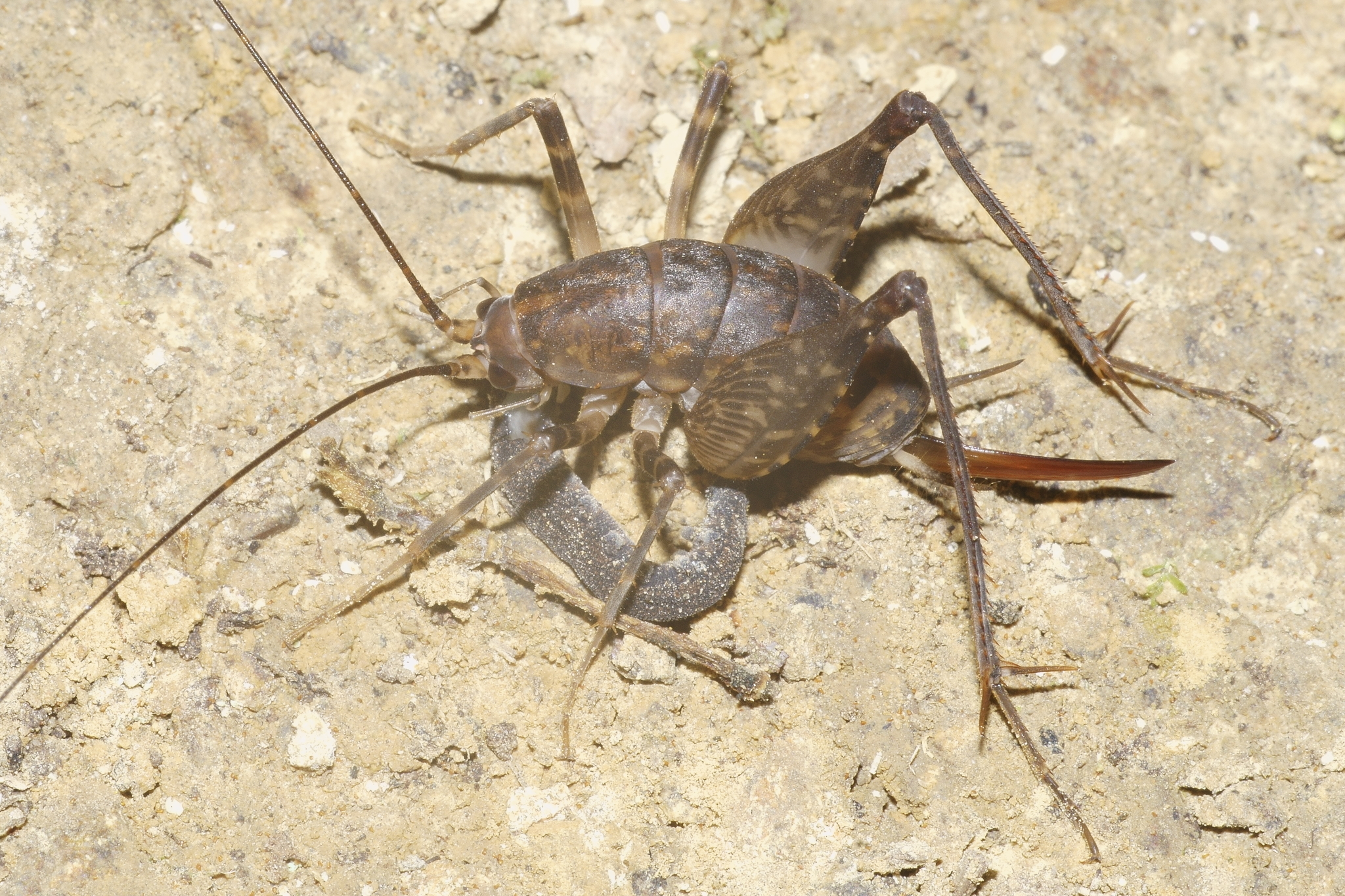
- Miotopus diversus

Scientific classification
- Kingdom: Animalia
- Phylum: Arthropoda
- Clade: Pancrustacea
- Class: Insecta
- Order: Orthoptera
- Suborder: Ensifera
- Family: Rhaphidophoridae
- Subfamily: Macropathinae
- Genus: Miotopus; Hutton, 1898

Species
- Miotopus diversus (Hutton, 1897); Miotopus richardsae Fitness, Morgan-Richards, Hegg & Trewick, 2018

= Miotopus =

Genus of insect

Miotopus is a genus of cave wētā in the family Rhaphidophoridae, endemic to New Zealand. The genus was first proposed by Frederick Wollaston Hutton in 1898, later synonymised under Pleioplectron, and reinstated in 2018. It currently comprises two described species: Miotopus diversus and Miotopus richardsae.

== Morphology ==
Species of Miotopus are medium-sized cave wētā, with body lengths ranging from 11 to 17 mm (0.43 to 0.67 in). The overall colouration is brown, with a distincitve and consistent dorsal pattern of alternating reddish-brown and black patches. The head is elongated, more so than in the related genus Pleioplectron. The body surface is covered in short, fine hairs. The legs of Miotopus are relatively long, particularly in M. richardsi. For both of the species, the fore and mid tibia have two pairs of apical spines, while the hind tibia have four pairs.

== Taxonomy ==
The taxon now recognised as Miotopus was first described by Frederick Wollaston Hutton in 1897 as a species of Pleioplectron, which he named Pleioplectron diversum. In 1898, Hutton elevated it to genus rank, creating Miotopus for this single species, Miotopus diversus.

In 1959, entomologist Aola Richards re-examined the group and disagreed with Hutton's assessment.

Until 2018 a research recovered Miotopus as a distinct, monophyletic lineage with significant genetic divergence from its closest relatives, along with consistent morphological differences.

== Sexual dimorphism ==
Males and females of Miotopus shows sexual dimorphism, they can be distinguished by several features. One of the most noticeable differences is in their antenna; the first main segment at the base of the antenna (the scape) is very broad and thick in males, but much thinner in females. The male antenna are also covered in dense hairs and taper abruptly towards the tip, while female antenna are more uniformly thin. Both sexes have long, slender tail-like appendages called cerci, though these are especially long in males. The male and female reproductive structures are distinct to each species. The female has ovipositor, with 7 to 8 small teeth near the tip. In the species Miotopus richardsae, the ovipositor is notably long, being as long as or even longer than the body.

== Diet ==
The diet of Miotopus has been documented through direct observations in the wild, though such records remain sporadic. In Miotopus richardsae, researchers have observed the species feeding on a variety of plant and fungal matter.
