= Weta, Ghana =

Weta (Ʋeta)
- Location of Wheta in Volta Region, Ghana
- Coordinates: 6°5′0″N 0°58′0″E
- Country: Ghana
- Region: Volta Region
- District: Ketu North Municipal

Weta (or Ʋeta) is a town in Ghana in the Volta Region. Weta (Ʋeta) is the place of birth of the Ghanaian poet Kofi Awoonor, who died in the Westgate shopping mall shooting in Nairobi on 21 September 2013.
