= Adaku Ufere-Awoonor =

Nigerian energy professional and lawyer (born 1985)

Adaku Ufere
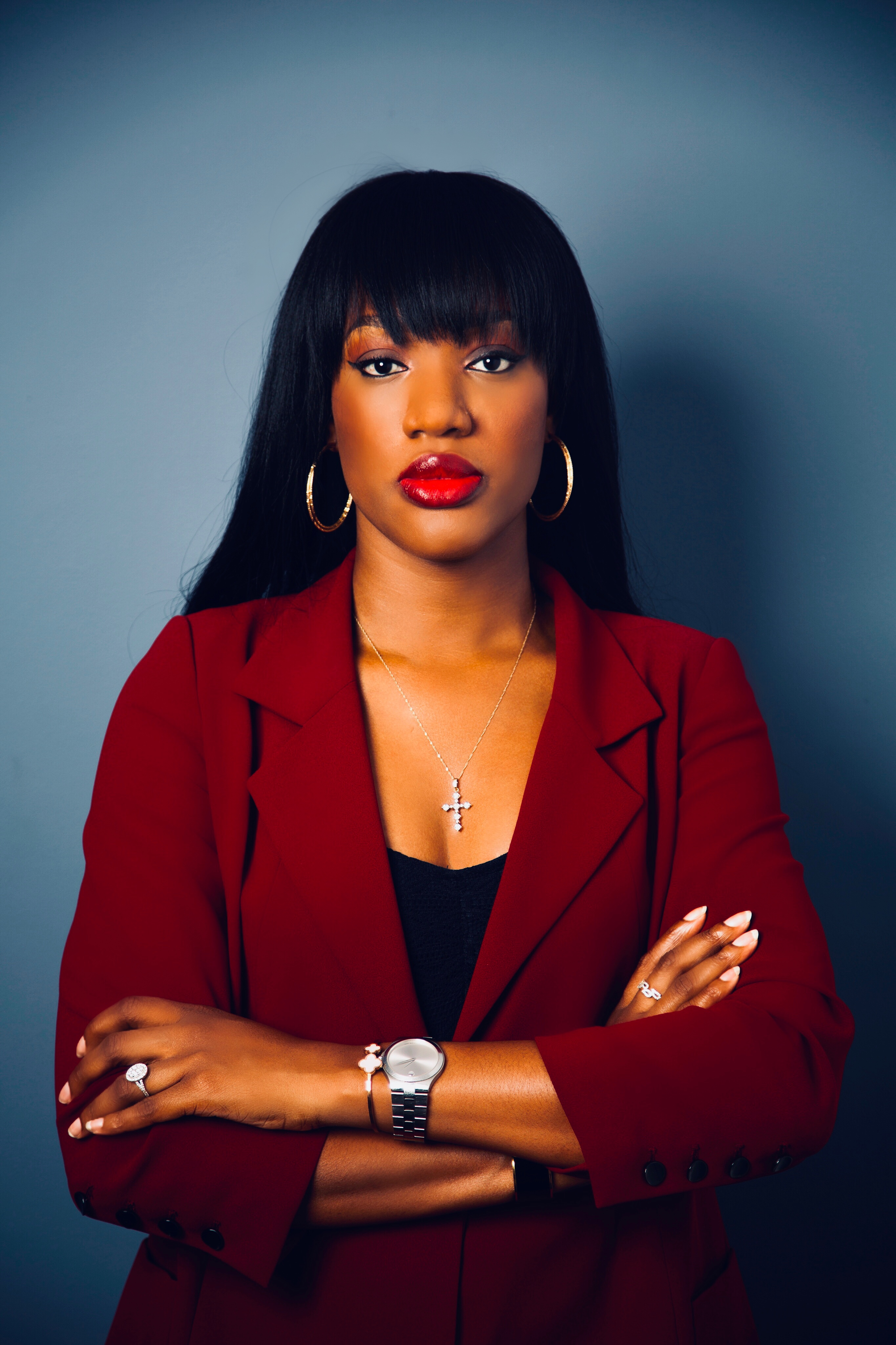

Chief of Party, USAID-funded Power Africa West Africa Energy Program

Founder DAX Consult

Personal details
- Born: Adaku Ufere; 7 July 1985 (age 41) Lagos, Nigeria
- Children: 2
- Education: University of Nigeria; Nigerian Law School; University of Aberdeen; University of California
- Occupation: Energy, gender & development lawyer

Adaku Ufere (born July 7, 1985) is a Nigerian energy professional and an international oil and gas, gender and development lawyer. She is the current Chief of Party of the USAID-funded Power Africa West Africa Energy Program in Accra, Ghana. She also founded Energy & Gender consulting firm DAX Consult.

== Education ==
Adaku attended Corona School Apapa and Grange School Ikeja, both in Lagos for her primary education. She proceeded first to Vivian Fowler Memorial College for Girls and then to Queen's College for her secondary school education. She is a graduate of the University of Nigeria, Nsukka; where she obtained a Bachelor of Laws degree (LL.B) in 2007. Adaku then attended to the Nigerian Law School, Abuja Campus in 2008 to complete her Bachelor of Laws (B.L) programme. After completing her National Youth Service, she obtained a Master of Laws degree in Oil and Gas from the University of Aberdeen. Adaku has attended several executive education programs and obtained a Certification in Gender & Sexuality: Applications in Society, from the University of British Columbia, Canada, a Certification in Public Management from the University of California, Davis as a Mandela Washington Fellow, and a Certification Energy Leadership from the University of South Africa (Unisa) after completing the Young Women in African Power programme presented by the Young African Leaders Initiative (YALI) Regional Leadership Centre for Southern Africa (RLC-SA).

== Career ==
Adaku's decision to go into the oil and gas industry was inspired by the appointment of Diezani Alison-Madueke as the first Nigerian female minister of Petroleum Resources in 2010. As an oil and gas lawyer and energy professional, Adaku has held several international positions, such as the Head of the Energy Practice of Centurion Law Group in Equatorial Guinea, and with General Electric as Legal Counsel GE Oil & Gas in Nigeria. She has recorded a number of landmark achievements, in South Sudan she led the team who negotiated the country's first ever Production Sharing Contract and set up the first indigenous African exploration company to operate in South Sudan. In Equatorial Guinea she led teams that negotiated billion dollar investments into the country as well as drafting and implementing landmark statutes in Equatorial Guinea.

As an expert in international contracts, contractual management clauses and international corporate framework, Adaku has worked with several governments, as well as international and national oil companies. Her experience in energy and oil and gas spans countries such as Equatorial Guinea, Ghana, Cameroon, Mauritius, South Sudan, and South Africa.

Adaku offers legal services to fight against sexual and gender-based violence, providing prevention mechanisms and supporting survivors with psychosocial services. She previously held the position of the Head of Legal at STER Initiative, a Not-for-Profit organization. In 2019, STER collaborated with Nigeria's National Agency for the Prohibition of Trafficking in Persons, along with 15 non-governmental organisations, supported by the British Council, to set up Nigeria's first Sex Offenders Registry.

Adaku was appointed the Deputy Chief of Party, USAID-funded Power Africa West Africa Energy Program in 2019. A USAID and Power Africa coordinated initiative helping West Africa expand supply of and access to affordable and grid-connected electricity services; through technical assistance, capacity building and transaction support.

She was named Chief of Party of the Program in 2021 and is the first African to be named Chief of Party of a USAID and Power Africa Program, overseeing 23 countries in the West and Central African region.

== Professional membership and association ==
Adaku is a member of several professional bodies and associations, in addition to being a certified Chartered Arbitrator and a Member of the Chartered Institute of Arbitrators. She is also a member of the Association of International Petroleum Negotiators, Nigerian Bar Association, the Women in African Power, the International Bar Association, the Institute for Energy Security and the Young Women in Energy Association.

== Awards and recognition ==
Adaku has won numerous awards and recognition both locally and internationally.

2016 40 under 40 Leading Lawyers in Nigeria - Nigerian Legal Awards

2017 Attorney of the Year award - African Legal Awards Till date she is the youngest recipient of that award in Africa, as well as the first Nigerian and non-South African to win Attorney of the Year.

2018 Named a Mandela Washington Fellow, an initiative of the United States State Department. That same year, she was named the Young African Professional of the Year by the Independent Pan-African Youth Parliament in South Africa. She was also recognized as a Fellow of the Institute of Energy Security, Ghana.

2019 Named one of the 100 Most Inspiring Women in Nigeria and an Obama Foundation Leader for Africa.

2020 Recognized as an Energy Expert by the University of Aberdeen and was a part of the University's Exception Alumni Poster Campaign to inspire current students of the school.

2021 Named one of the top 100 Female Executives in the Oil & Gas Industry in Africa by African Shapers. She also received the African Legal Achievers Award from the Federation of African Law Students.
