= BOST Energies =

Ghanaian energy parastatal

Agency overview
- Formed: 1993
- Jurisdiction: Government of Ghana
- Headquarters: Nii Nortei Nyanchi Street, Accra
- Agency executive: Afetsi Awoonor, Managing Director
- Parent agency: Ministry of Energy and Petroleum
- Website: BOST

BOST Energies is a Ghanaian state agency under the Ministry of Energy and Petroleum responsible for the development of a network of storage tanks, pipelines and other bulk transportation infrastructure throughout the country and also to keep strategic reserve stocks of petroleum for Ghana. The company is now tasked with an additional responsibility as the Natural Gas Transmission Utility (NGTU) to develop the Natural Gas infrastructure throughout the country.

== History ==
BOST Energies, formerly Bulk Oil Storage and Transportation Company Limited (BOST), was established in December 1993 as a private liability company with the sole shareholder being the Government of Ghana. BOST Energies is the distributor of refined petroleum products from its strategic depots located throughout the country. On 9 December 2012 the company was granted Natural Gas Transmission Utility License (NGTU) by the Energy Commission (EC). The NGTU according to EC Act 541, 1997, provides transmission and interconnection services for natural gas throughout the country without discrimination.

== Functions ==
BOST Energies is responsible for developing pipelines and storage containers for the transportation of petroleum products and the storage of reserves. The company is also responsible for the transportation, distribution and storage of petroleum products in Ghana.

== See also ==
- Ministry of Energy and Petroleum
