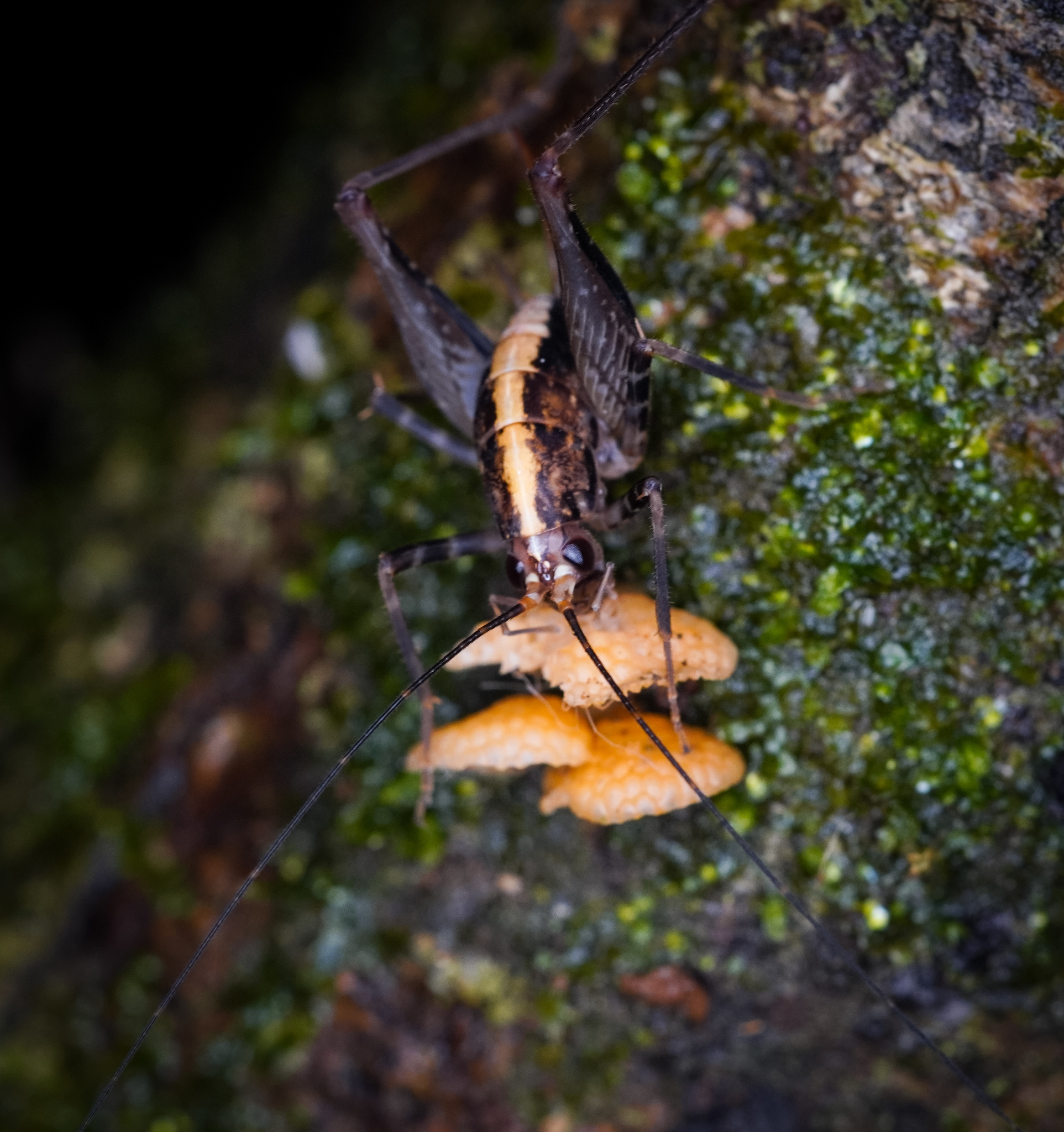
- Pleioplectron hudsoni

Scientific classification
- Kingdom: Animalia
- Phylum: Arthropoda
- Clade: Pancrustacea
- Class: Insecta
- Order: Orthoptera
- Suborder: Ensifera
- Family: Rhaphidophoridae
- Subfamily: Macropathinae
- Genus: Pleioplectron; Hutton 1896

Species
- See text

Synonyms
- Weta Chopard, 1923

= Pleioplectron =

Genus of orthopteran insects

Pleioplectron is a genus of cave wētā in the family Rhaphidophoridae, endemic to New Zealand. These wētā are fairly common at night among the leaf litter in native forest in the South Island of New Zealand. The species look very similar to species of Miotopus, another New Zealand endemic genus, recently resurrected.

There are currently ten recognised species of Pleioplectron. The genus was described by Hutton in 1896, with six species, three of which have since been moved (to Miotopus, Novoplectron, and Pachyrhamma), and two synonymised. The genus Weta, erected by Chopard in 1923, is now considered a synonym of Pleioplectron. Seven additional species of Pleioplectron were named in 2019.

All but one Pleioplectron species live in the South Island. The North Island species, Pleioplectron hudsoni, is widespread in forests, and females lay eggs into the soil or soft wood. In the South Island, P. simplex is sometimes found in woodpiles around houses and in cool basements between Christchurch and Invercargill. This species can be infected with parasites (a nematode) that cause the wētā host to drown itself. An alpine species of Pleioplectron was discovered in 1993 by wildlife photographer Rod Morris in the Seaward Kaikōura Ranges and described in 2019 as Pleioplectron rodmorrisi.

== Species ==
- Pleioplectron hudsoni Hutton, 1897
- Pleioplectron simplex Hutton, 1897
- Pleioplectron thomsoni (Chopard 1923)
- Pleioplectron auratum Hegg et al. 2019
- Pleioplectron caudatum Hegg et al. 2019
- Pleioplectron crystallae Hegg et al. 2019
- Pleioplectron flavicorne Hegg et al. 2019
- Pleioplectron gubernator Hegg et al. 2019
- Pleioplectron rodmorrisi Hegg et al. 2019
- Pleioplectron triquetrum Hegg et al. 2019
