= Kaipūpū Sanctuary =

Sanctuary in Picton, New Zealand

Kaipūpū Sanctuary is a predator-free sanctuary in Picton, New Zealand.

It is found in Shakespeare Bay in the Marlborough Sounds. There is a predator-free fence built around the peninsula, and traps throughout it. Access is available through water taxi from Picton. There is a 2.7 km (1.7 mi) walking track through the bush.
