= Westgate shopping mall attack =

2013 terrorist attack in Nairobi, Kenya

- Part of the War in Somalia and Terrorism in Kenya
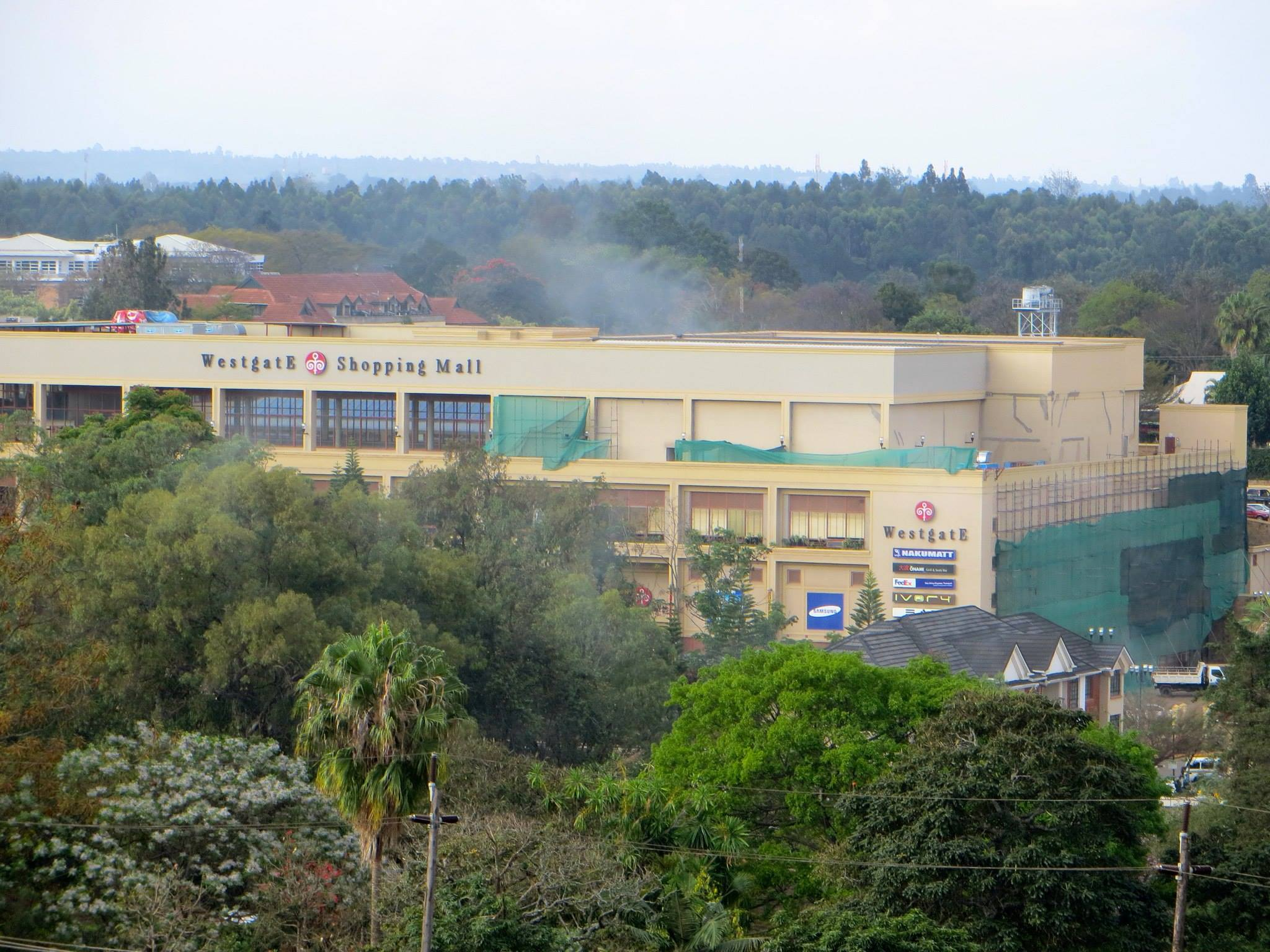
- Smoke over Westgate shopping mall on 23 September 2013
| Date | 21–24 September 2013 |
| Location | Westlands, Nairobi, Kenya 1°15′25″S 36°48′12″E |
| Result | Crisis ended: 71 killed; Friendly fire incident kills a police unit commander and injures two more; Partial collapse of the Westgate Mall |

Belligerents
| Al-Shabaab | Kenya: Kenya Defence Forces; Kenya Police Service; Administration Police; National Intelligence Service (Kenya); General Service Unit (Kenya); Supported by: United States; United Kingdom; Israel |

Commanders and leaders
| Ahmed Godane; Adan Garaar; Abu Baara al Sudani †; Omar Nabhan †; Umayr al-Mogadish †; Khattab al-Kene † | (Kenya) Uhuru Kenyatta (Kenya) Joseph Ole Lenku (Kenya) William Saiya Aswenje; Julius Waweru Karangi; Grace Kaindi; Martin Munene † |

Units involved
| Unknown | Kenya Army Infantry; Recce Squad |

Strength
| 4 fighters | (Kenya) Unknown |

Casualties and losses
| 4 killed | (Kenya) : 5 killed, 12 wounded |
- 62 civilians killed, 163 wounded
- ^{*} Al Shabaab leaders subsequently killed in retaliatory air-strikes (per Kenya's military).

On 21 September 2013, four gunmen attacked the Westgate shopping mall, an upmarket mall in Nairobi, Kenya. There are conflicting reports about the number killed in the attack, since part of the mall collapsed due to a fire that started during the siege. The attack resulted in 71 total deaths, including 62 civilians, five Kenyan soldiers, and all four gunmen. Approximately 200 people were wounded in the attack.

The militant Islamist group al-Shabaab claimed responsibility for the incident, which it characterised as retribution for the Kenyan military's deployment in the group's home country of Somalia following Operation Linda Nchi from 2011 to 2012.

Kenyan authorities arrested dozens of people in the aftermath of the attack, but had not announced any suspects directly related to the siege. On 4 November 2013, a Kenyan court charged four Somali nationals with harbouring the gunmen in their homes, with each pleading not guilty.

On 20 September 2015, Foreign Policy magazine reported the Westgate attack lasted several hours, with the last victim killed before special Kenyan security forces entered the mall. The mall was officially declared secured on 24 September.

== Background ==
The incident followed threats from Al-Shabaab in late 2011 of attacks in Kenya in retaliation for Operation Linda Nchi, a coordinated military operation in southern Somalia that was launched against the group by the Somali Armed Forces and Kenya Defence Forces. One week before the incident and a month after United Nations warnings of possible attacks, Kenyan police claimed to have disrupted a major attack in its final stages of planning after arresting two people with grenades, AK-47 assault rifles, and suicide vests packed with ball bearings. The two suspects were from a Nairobi neighbourhood where Somali immigrants live. A manhunt was also launched for eight more suspects. The Sunday Telegraph claimed that it had seen United Nations documents that warned that in the previous month the threat of an "attempted large-scale attack" in Kenya was "elevated." After the incident, Nairobi senator Mike Sonko claimed that he had warned the security services of a possible attack three months previously. The country was celebrating the International Day of Peace when the incident took place.

== Preparation ==
An Al-Shabaab team, led by the Somali national Adan Garaar, conducted extensive reconnaissance of the building, noting entrances, exits, security systems, and other details. The mall’s unarmed security guards and casual checks for metal objects made it an attractive target for the group. Garaar, who was the head of Al-Shabaab’s external operations unit, took advantage of Kenya’s relaxed security measures and relocated to the town of Garissa in 2011 and began to plan the Westgate attack, securing support from Al-Shabaab’s leadership. The team visited Nairobi several times to inspect the mall and built a network to covertly obtain weapons, ammunition, SIM cards and a Mitsubishi Lancer. He reported his findings through Al-Shabaab’s chain of command who then submitted plans to Al-Shabaab’s senior operations commander, Abdirahman Sandhere and was approved by the emir of Al-Shabaab, Ahmed Godane shortly after. All four attackers arrived around three months before the siege. Adan Garaar was killed after a drone strike on 12 March 2015. Garaar was in a vehicle hit by a missile near the town of Dinsoor in southern Somalia.

On 17 June 2013, one of the attackers, Mohamed Abdinur Said, known by his nom de guerre as Umayr al-Mogadish, boarded East African Express flight 803 from Mogadishu's Aden Adde International Airport to Nairobi via Wajir and Entebbe, Uganda. Abdinur, who presented himself as a student with no travel history, passed through security without arousing suspicion. Call log data later revealed that he made several phone calls to known Al-Shabaab members in Somalia while waiting for the flight to be cleared at Wajir International Airport.

Two other attackers, including Ahmed Hassan Abukar and Hassan Abdi Dhuhulow, used Uganda’s Entebbe International Airport as a point of entry into Kenya to avoid the heightened security measures at Nairobi's Jomo Kenyatta International Airport (JKIA). Abukar and Abdinur had known each other from their time in Kakuma Refugee Camp, and over the years had been radicalised by Al Shabaab, while Dhuhulow was radicalised online in Norway. By 26 July 2013, Mohamed Abdinur boarded a bus from Kampala to Nairobi, joining Ahmed Abukar, who was already in Kenya. The attackers communicated extensively via phone, coordinating their movements across Uganda and Kenya. Abdinur, believed to be the group’s leader, made frequent calls to Mohamed Abdi, who was later convicted for his role in planning the attack.

== Shootings and initial siege ==
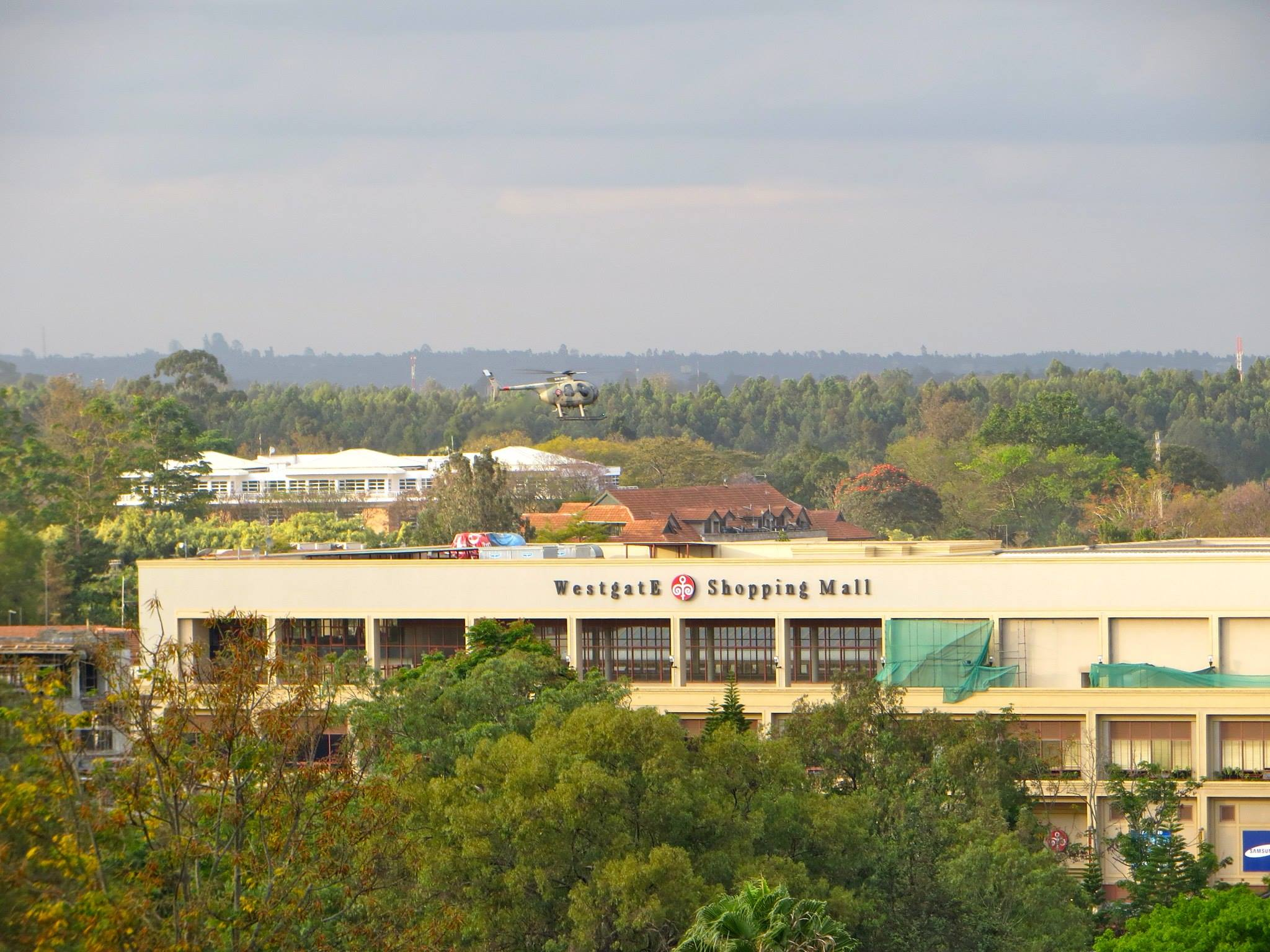
A Kenyan military MD 500 Defender helicopter hovering over the mall on 23 September

Hassan Abdi Dhuhulow on CCTV footage in a shop during the shooting

On Saturday 21 September 2013, at about 12:25 p.m., at least four masked assailants (initially claimed by the government to be between 10 and 15) jumped out of a silver Mitsubishi Lancer on Mwanzi Road, near the front entrance of the Westgate shopping mall, the most upscale mall in Nairobi, in its Westlands district. They threw three grenades; one hit a nearby coffee shop, while two hit a security booth nearby. The four militants split into pairs. One pair made for the main pedestrian entrance, while the other continued along the front of the building toward the vehicle entrance. Two of the gunman made it up to the upstairs parking lot, where a children’s cooking competition was being held. They approached and threw grenades and opened fire indiscriminately. One of the militants said in English: “In the name of Allah, the Most Gracious, the Most Merciful. We’ve come to kill you Christians and Kenyans for what you are doing in Somalia." One of the attackers yelled "we are al-Shabab".

The two other gunmen had been shooting at shoppers from the main entrance. One of the gunmen, Abu Baara al-Sudani (later identified as Hassan Abdi Dhuhulow), entered the Urban Burgers restaurant and fired at the patrons, mostly foreign tourists and expats, killing three and injuring numerous others. Dhuhulow had made a phone call to his uncle in Egypt, Abdi Mohammed Dhuhulow, where he claimed responsibility for the ongoing assault. Dhuhulow reportedly told his uncle to watch BBC and Al Jazeera, stating, "I am responsible for that. Say bye to the family." Earlier in the attack, Dhuhulow had been shot in the leg by Constable Ali Miraji, who had initially mistaken the attackers for General Service Unit (GSU) officers. CCTV footage from inside the mall showed Dhuhulow limping with a blood-soaked bandage around his left knee. The attackers had discarded their cell phones two days prior to the siege, but two of their new numbers were traced to a location in Eastleigh and later to Westgate, where they arrived shortly before the attack began. By 1:15 p.m, all four gunmen regrouped together in a supermarket. The militants let an expatriate woman and her two children leave the store, along with an injured Kenyan teenage girl. Shortly after, the militants got into their first major confrontation with armed police, which would continue on throughout the day. Police surrounded the area and urged residents to stay away. A report indicated that about 80 people were trapped in the basement, but police said that they had escorted some shoppers to safety and were trying to capture the gunmen.

All four gunmen ended up inside a storeroom at the Nakumatt supermarket, where they would remain for the rest of the siege. Kenyan security forces began their operation at 4:00 p.m., almost four hours after the beginning of the attack. Most of the victims were killed in the first hour. Gunmen were seen on CCTV talking on mobile phones and bowing down in Islamic prayer between their attacks.

Rob Van Dijk, an employee of the Dutch embassy, said that while he was eating at a restaurant the attack started with grenades and was followed by gunfire as patrons screamed and dropped to the ground. Other witnesses said the attack began at the outdoor seating area of Artcaffe at the front of the mall. An Artcaffe employee, Patrick Kuria, said: "We started by hearing gunshots downstairs and outside. Later we heard them come inside. We took cover. Then we saw two gunmen wearing black turbans. I saw them shoot." Some of the casualties were at the entrance to the mall after the assailants moved outside and a stand-off then commenced with police. Ambulances were present at the mall as rescuers started moving emerging victims. Reports indicated children were among the victims, and patrons that were carrying small children were among those trapped. Mall security guards used shopping carts to ferry out wounded children.

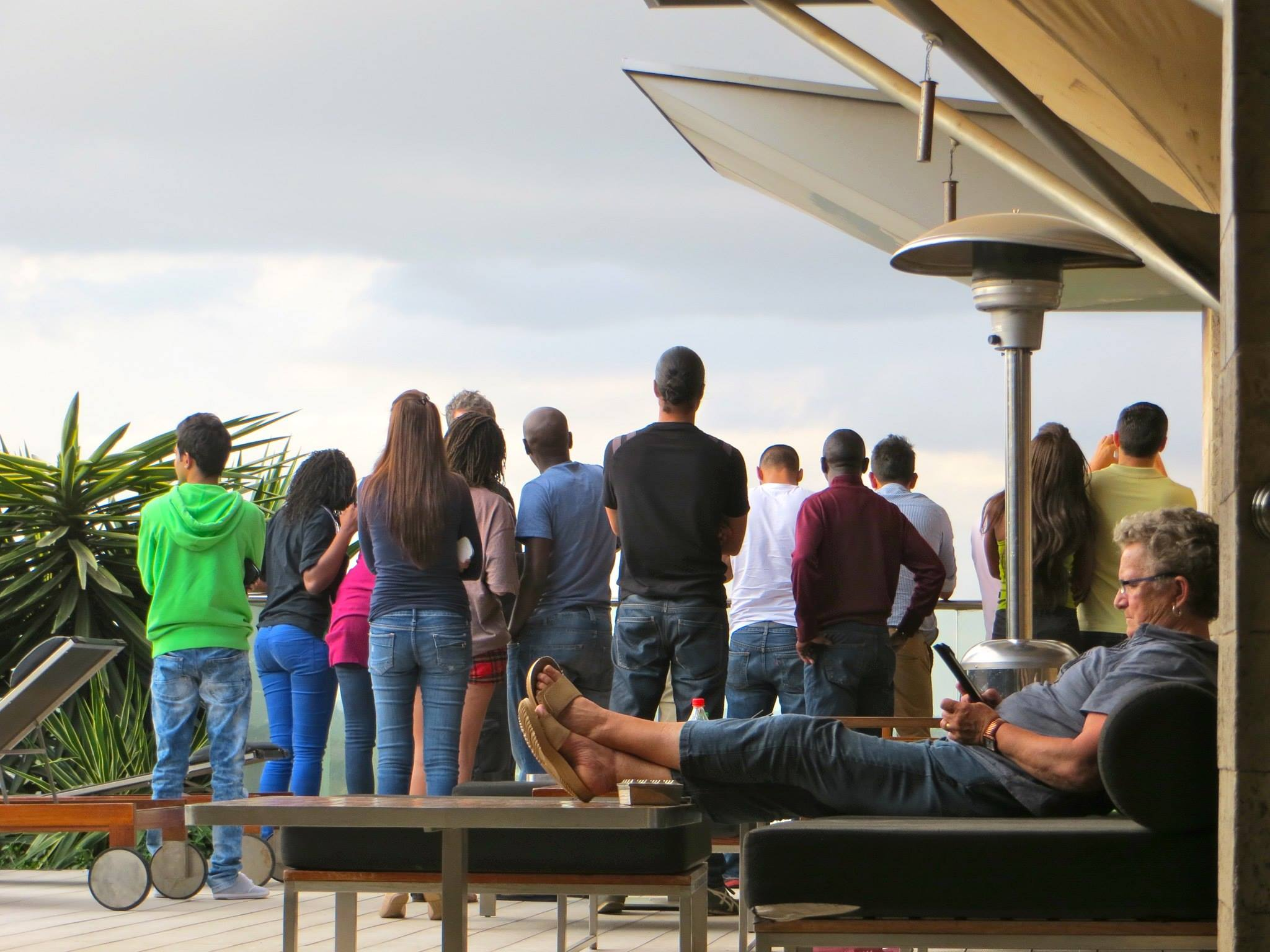
Onlookers on a hotel roof

Nation TV footage showed dozens of people escaping from a back entrance. Twenty people were rescued from a toy shop on the upper floor. As the Kenyan army troops arrived, they used tear gas to try to smoke out the attackers from the cinema complex. Vehicles riddled with bullet holes were left abandoned in front of the mall. Kimaiyo said: "Our officers are on the ground carrying out an evacuation of those inside as they search for the attackers who are said to be inside." A police officer indicated that there were three bodies there while he pointed to a pool of blood by a children's shoe shop. He then pointed to a hamburger bar where music still played and indicated more bodies were found there.

The attackers had told Muslims to leave and that non-Muslims would be targeted. Others were asked to name the mother of the Islamic prophet Muhammad to distinguish Muslims from non-Muslims. They also distinguished Muslims from non-Muslims by asking others to recite the shahadah. To Associated Press, al-Shabaab called it "a meticulous vetting process ... to separate the Muslims from the Kuffar". At least two people were killed for incorrectly stating the Shahadah.

=== Friendly fire incident ===
The Recce Company, a specialised unit of Kenya’s General Service Unit (GSU), arrived at around 4:00 PM. They entered the mall through the rooftop car park, while Kenya Defense Force soldiers simultaneously entered from the ground floor. The two groups were not in communication with each other, which led to them mistakenly engaging in a shoot-out with each other on the first floor of the mall. The commander of the Recce Squad, Martin Munene, was killed, and two officers were injured. In the aftermath, the Recce Squad members withdrew from the operation, followed by the withdrawal of the army, leaving no Kenyan military presence in the mall for several hours.

== Rescue efforts ==
Goran Tomašević, Reuters chief photographer for East Africa, recorded the first few hours of the attacks in which he described extremely distressed people including children, women and men bleeding from the impact of shrapnel and gunshots. Abdul Yusuf Haji, son of former Defence Minister of Kenya Mohamed Yusuf Haji, on receiving text messages from his brother Noordin Yusuf Haji, an undercover anti-terrorism agent who was stuck inside the shopping center, travelled to the mall with his handgun and entered with other civilian rescuers. He helped rescue a mother and her three daughters, providing cover with other armed rescuers. Tomasevic's photos of the rescue efforts by civilians were beamed all around the world.

Several other armed and unarmed civilians also participated in various rescues. The British military veterans, Taff Groves (22 SAS) and Dominic Troulan, the Irish Army veteran Lorcan Byrne and the off-duty member of the Diplomatic Protective Services Tactical Response Unit Peter Bach helped to save lives in the immediate aftermath of the attack. All four men were working as security consultants and rushed to the mall after the militants began their attack. Under fire, they organised the rescue of terrified shoppers. There are several similarities between this rescue by civilians and members of elite forces and the rescue at Nairobi DusitD2 complex attack. Troulan was subsequently awarded the George Cross, Britain's highest award for civilian gallantry.

By nightfall, the mall remained sealed off to the public while security services searched floor by floor for the gunmen, believed to still be inside with the hostages. People continued to trickle out from hiding places. The Kenyan Red Cross said on 24 September that 63 people were still missing. In Nairobi, daily business returned to normal; appeals replenished blood banks, and over US$650,000 was raised to support the affected families.

=== Israeli involvement ===
At the time of the attacks, the mall was owned by Israelis, and at least four restaurants in the mall were owned/operated by Israelis, according to Israeli sources. The International Business Times stated that Kenya and Israel had a secret security pact. Israeli military advisers were reported to have participated in the counter-offensive against the hostage takers and to have joined in the fighting, although the Israeli Foreign Ministry refused to confirm or deny the involvement of its forces in the incident. An al-Shabaab spokesman claimed that the attackers inside Westgate had killed four "Jewish" soldiers.

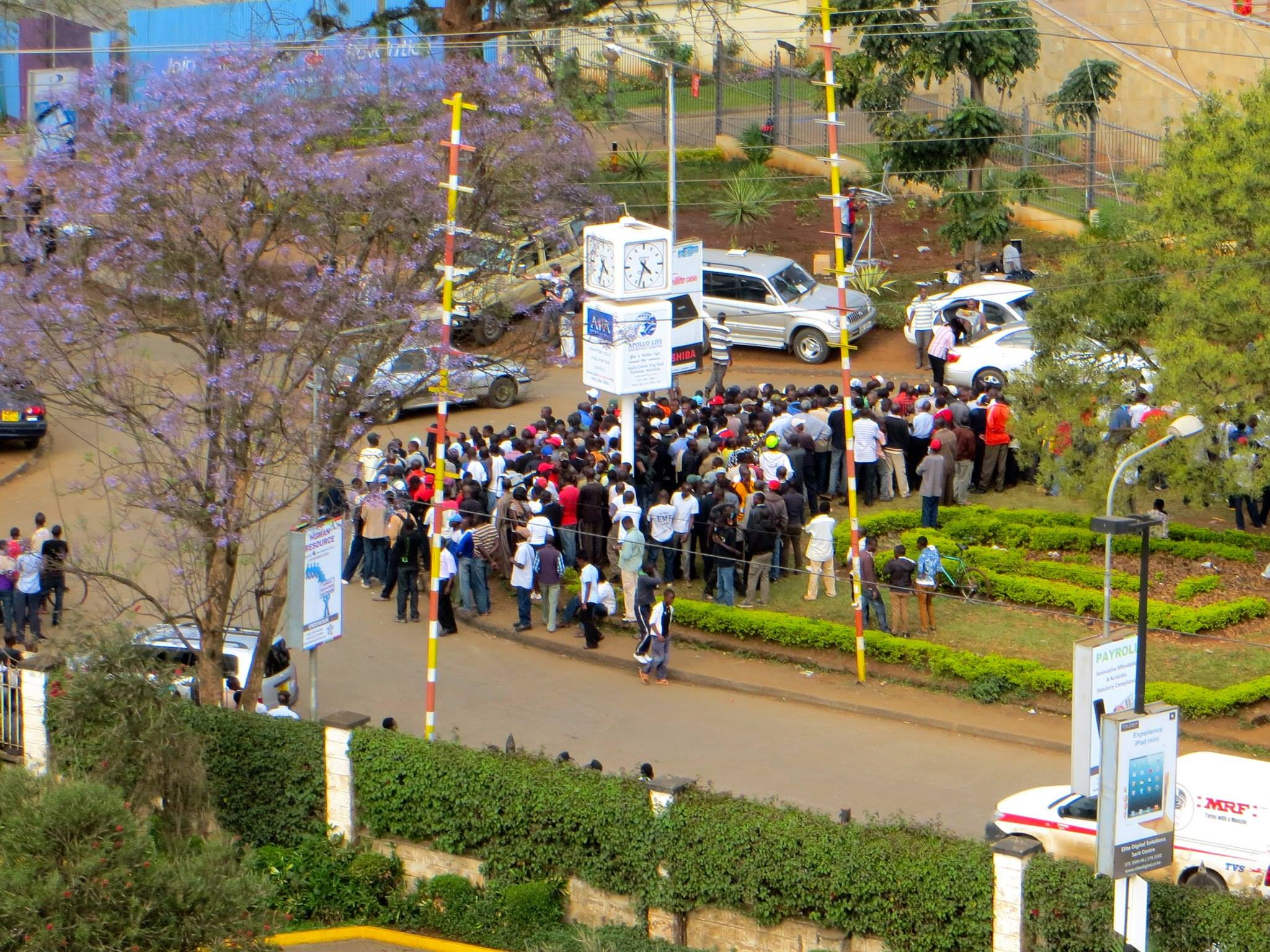
Onlookers near the mall during the attack

=== Looting ===
In the days following the initial attack, Kenyan soldiers arrived at the scene to rescue people inside, and find the gunmen. Shortly after entering, however, soldiers were seen on camera looting almost every store in the mall while still under besiegement. Two soldiers were arrested and jailed for looting mobile phones and several others were questioned.

== Casualties ==
| Nationality | Deaths |
|---|---|
| Kenya | 48 |
| United Kingdom | 4 |
| India | 3 |
| Canada | 2 |
| France | 2 |
| Australia | 1 |
| China | 1 |
| Ghana | 1 |
| Netherlands | 1 |
| Peru | 1 |
| South Africa | 1 |
| South Korea | 1 |
| Trinidad and Tobago | 1 |

During the siege and for days afterwards, the toll of casualties remained unclear. Eyewitnesses were reported to have seen 50 bodies in the mall. In addition, at first there were reported hostages taken by attackers, but later it became apparent no hostages were ever held, other eyewitnesses also said that they had seen dozens wounded. An unnamed local hospital reported that it was overwhelmed with the number of wounded being brought in and that it had consequently diverted victims to a second facility. At least 71 people were killed, including four terrorists. In addition to numerous Kenyans who were killed, at least 19 foreigners of different nationalities also died. The National Disaster Operation Centre said that the wounded ranged in age from 2 to 78. Sources said 175 people were wounded, including 11 soldiers. There are also claims of torture carried out by the terrorists. Notable victims included Kenyan journalist Ruhila Adatia-Sood, President Uhuru Kenyatta's nephew Mbugua Mwangi and his fiancée Rosemary Wahito, Ghanaian poet and diplomat Kofi Awoonor and Canadian diplomat Annemarie Desloges. Kenyan interior minister Joseph Ole Lenku said Israelis were not targeted. "This time, the story is not about Israel. The minister is saying that this is an internal Kenyan issue. His security forces tell him that this terror organisation was not targeting Israelis."

Most of the victims were from Kenya’s business and political elite, as well as expatriates and the diplomatic community.

== Investigation ==
British police officers based in Kenya arrived on the scene to help Kenyan counter-terrorism officials, and Kenyan officials began an investigation. Security was also tightened in public places across Kenya. Ten arrests were reported on 24 September. In announcing the end of operations, Kenyatta said "forensic investigations are underway to establish the nationalities of all those involved" and suggested that a British woman and two or three Americans "may have been involved in the attack" but that could not be confirmed at the time. Kenyan Defence Chief, General Julius Karangi, said the attackers were from "different countries."

The National Intelligence Service (NIS) was strongly criticised for failing to warn of the attack after The Star reported that two unnamed NIS officers had told it that the NIS had passed warnings about an attack to the police, and that a pregnant woman had been warned by her brother, an NIS officer, not to visit the Westgate mall that Saturday "because she would not be able to run with her bulging tummy". The Observer reported that Kenya had prior intelligence of an attack in Nairobi, and that there were reports of NIS agents being at Westgate a few hours before the attack. From its start, the investigation was hampered by a wide range of conflicting eyewitness testimony about the number of attackers, the gunmen's true identities, and even their ultimate fates. Over sixty persons were listed by the Red Cross as missing, though police asserted that they were all among the dead; in news reports, some have been described as additional terrorists who escaped alive, though the Kenyan government firmly denies this.

It was reported on 10 October that the police, army, and intelligence services had been engaging in "blame games" after the attack. Some international forensic teams had reportedly returned home, frustrated that they were not allowed full access to the mall.

A separate investigation of the attack was conducted by the New York Police Department (NYPD). The report's findings, released in December 2013, suggested that the attack had been carried out by only four Al-Shabaab terrorists, all of whom most likely escaped the mall alive. However, an investigation conducted between Kenyan and US State Department officials suggested that while there were only four gunmen who carried out the attack, they were all likely killed during the standoff. Lt. Kevin Yorke of the NYPD's Intelligence Division also acknowledged that the NYPD investigation, which did not have representatives among the group of western investigators assisting Kenya with the probe, was "based solely on open-source information we gathered and is unclassified."

== Perpetrators ==
On 5 October 2015, the Kenyan government released the noms de guerre believed to have been used by the four attackers. The shooters were named as Abu Baara al-Sudani, Omar Abdul Rahim Nabhan, Khattab al-Kene, and Umayr al-Mogadish. The youngest attacker was reportedly 19 and the oldest was 23. Police recovered the attacker's bodies under rubble and performed DNA analysis to identify the assailants, who died of smoke inhalation according to autopsy results.

Norway's intelligence agency, the PST, later announced in early October that it had sent officers to Kenya to investigate reports alleging that a Norwegian citizen of Somali origin, named as Hassan Abdi Dhuhulow, was also involved in the planning and execution of the attack. Dhuhulow, who was 23 during the attack, was confirmed to have been the perpetrator and died in the attack in 2015. Having migrated to Norway in 1999, Dhuhulow had previously been under surveillance by PST.

In September 2013, the attackers were publicly identified as Hassan Abdi Mohamed alias Dhuhulow (Abu Baara al-Sudani), Ahmed Hassan Abukar (Khattab al-Kene), Mohammed Abdinur Said (Umayr al-Mogadish), and Yahye Osman Ahmed alias Arab (Omar Nabhan; aka Yahya Golis). Al-Shabaab denied that any of the names attributed to any of the attackers are genuine.

The investigation led by the Directorate of Criminal Investigations (DCI) concluded that Mohammed Abdinur Said was the commander of the attack and had been planning since June 2013. Before the attack began, the attackers shred their belongings and documents inside of a Mitsubishi Lancer they purchased in September 2013. They attempted to light the car on fire inside of the mall's parking lot but the fire extinguished itself shortly after, failing to destroy the attackers belongings.

Insurance registration found inside of the attackers car led the DCI to two co-conspirators, Abdikadir Mohamed and Abdullahi Dugon Subow, who fled Kenya for Somalia. One of the reconstructed documents was a receipt to one of the gunmen, Mohammed Abdinur Said. Data obtained for the five SIM cards found inside of the car led investigators to Entebbe Airport in Uganda which allowed the DCI to identify the gunmen and two co-conspirators, Hussein Hassan Mustafa and Mohammed Ahmed Abdi.

Kenyan authorities arrested dozens of people in the aftermath of the attack, but had not announced any suspects directly related to the siege. On 4 November 2013, four individuals reported to be Somali nationals were charged by a Kenyan court in relation to the attack. Identified as Mohammed Ahmed Abdi, Liban Abdullah, Adnan Ibrahim and Hussein Hassan, they were accused of supporting terrorist elements in Kenya, harboring the gunmen in their homes, illicitly registering as a Kenyan citizen, and obtaining false identification documents. However, none of the men were accused of being the shooters involved in the siege, the latter of whom Kenyan military officials asserted had all died. All four of the accused men pleaded not guilty to the allegations, with no attorney representing them. The court ordered the men to be detained until a hearing in a week's time.

On 7 October 2020, a Kenyan court sentenced three defendants accused of helping Islamic militants in 2013 in preparation for an attack on Nairobi’s shopping mall. More than 140 witnesses were heard in the case before the verdict was handed down. In the verdict, Nairobi Chief Magistrate Francis Andayi ruled that Hussein Hassan Mustafa and Mohammed Ahmed Abdi found guilty of conspiracy to commit a terrorist act. In the case of the third defendant, there was not enough evidence to prove the conspiracy charge, so he was acquitted. Earlier, in January 2019, an accused had also been acquitted in the same case for lack of evidence. However, after proving the prosecution's charge, Otsieno Namwaya, a senior Africa researcher at Human Rights Watch, claimed that neither the attackers nor the masterminds had been brought to justice now, the convicts were only bystanders in the case.

== Responsibility ==
Al Shabaab claimed responsibility shortly after the attack began. Before it was banned, a Twitter account claiming to represent al-Shabaab posted a series of messages alleging that the attacks were "just retribution" for crimes committed by Kenya's military. "For long we have waged war against the Kenyans in our land, now it's time to shift the battleground and take the war to their land", said one post. "The attack at #WestgateMall is just a very tiny fraction of what Muslims in Somalia experience at the hands of Kenyan invaders," said another. They warned the Kenyan government that any attempt by Kenyan forces to attempt a roof landing would jeopardise the lives of hostages. Twitter suspended the account before the attack had ended.

The group official spokesman, Sheikh Ali Mohamud Rage, said: "If you want Kenya in peace, it will not happen as long as your boys are in Somalia." Another Al-Shabaab spokesman, Sheikh Abdul-Aziz Abu Musab, the official military spokesperson for Al-Shabaab, told Al Jazeera that the attack was in retaliation for Kenyan troops entering Somalia and that the timing was deliberately chosen to be a surprise attack. al-Shabaab repeated their demands for Kenya's withdrawal from Somalia. On the day the operation ended, Rage threatened further "black days" unless Kenya withdrew its troops from Somalia and said that the siege was just "a taste of what we will do."

Foreign Minister Amina Mohamed said that Al-Shabaab was not acting alone and the assault was part of an international campaign of terror; and that "two or three" US citizens and a Briton were among the attackers. "Al-Shabab [sic] are looking for relevance on an international scale – especially after a change of leadership – and is looking to send the message that they are still a force to be reckoned with." The suggestion that there had been a British perpetrator in their ranks was strongly rejected by Al-Shabaab. Kenyan officials later lowered the estimated number of gunmen to four to six militants, when it was previously estimated as ten.

== Reactions ==
=== Domestic ===
The attack has been described as one of the worst acts of terrorism in Kenya since the bombing of the U.S. embassy in 1998. President Uhuru Kenyatta said on national television that Kenya had "overcome terrorist attacks before" and vowed to "hunt down the perpetrators wherever they run".

On 10 October 2013, it was reported that President Kenyatta had admitted that the Westgate operation was "bungled", and undertook to carry out a complete investigation. The Kenyan Cabinet was expected to establish a formal commission of inquiry.

=== International bodies ===
The African Union's Chairperson of the African Union Commission Nkosazana Dlamini-Zuma condemned the attacks and reiterated that the AU would continue in its fight against al-Shabaab. She also expressed the AU's solidarity with the government and people of Kenya. The European Union offered its support. UN Secretary-General Ban Ki-moon expressed "alarm" and offered Kenyatta solidarity. The United Nations Security Council condemned the attack and called on Kenya to note that any response must comply with international human rights law.

Interpol Secretary-General Ronald Noble condemned the assault and pledged full support to Kenyan authorities in their investigation, offering to deploy an Incident Response Team consisting of specialised forensic officers, counter-terrorism experts, operational assistants and analysts. Noble, in an interview with ABC, indicated that in the face of large 'soft' targets, governments have a choice: security clearances at entrances or allow the citizenry to carry guns for self-defence.

=== States ===
Many countries expressed their condemnation of the attacks and sympathy for those affected, including Argentina, Canada, Chile, China, Colombia, Eritrea, Hungary, India, Iran, Israel, Italy, Serbia, Somalia, Tanzania, the United States, Venezuela, and Trinidad and Tobago. Some restated their condemnation during the General debate of the sixty-eighth session of the United Nations General Assembly.

Somali President Hassan Sheikh Mohamud condemned the "heartless acts against defenceless civilians" and pledged to "stand shoulder to shoulder with Kenya." He also cautioned against prejudgement, saying that "we don't have any proof that the people who did this are Somali."

King Mohammed VI of Morocco expressed "profound emotion and indignation"; Tanzanian President Jakaya Kikwete and South African President Jacob Zuma also expressed condolences and reiterated support for Kenyan and international efforts "aimed at peacekeeping, stability, democracy and nation-building in Somalia." Sahrawi Arab Democratic Republic President and Secretary-General of the Polisario Front, Mohamed Abdelaziz expressed "sadness and dismay about the shocking and cowardly massacre" and offered his country's "deepest condolences" and "heartfelt sympathy".

== See also ==
- 1998 United States embassy bombings
- 2002 Mombasa attacks
- 2011–2014 terrorist attacks in Kenya
- 2013 Nairobi bus attack
- 2019 Nairobi hotel attack
- Robert Alai
- Garissa University College attack
- List of Islamist terrorist attacks
- List of filmed mass shootings
- Terrorism in Kenya
