= Westgate, Nairobi =

Shopping mall located at Westlands in Nairobi, Kenya

Westgate Shopping Mall
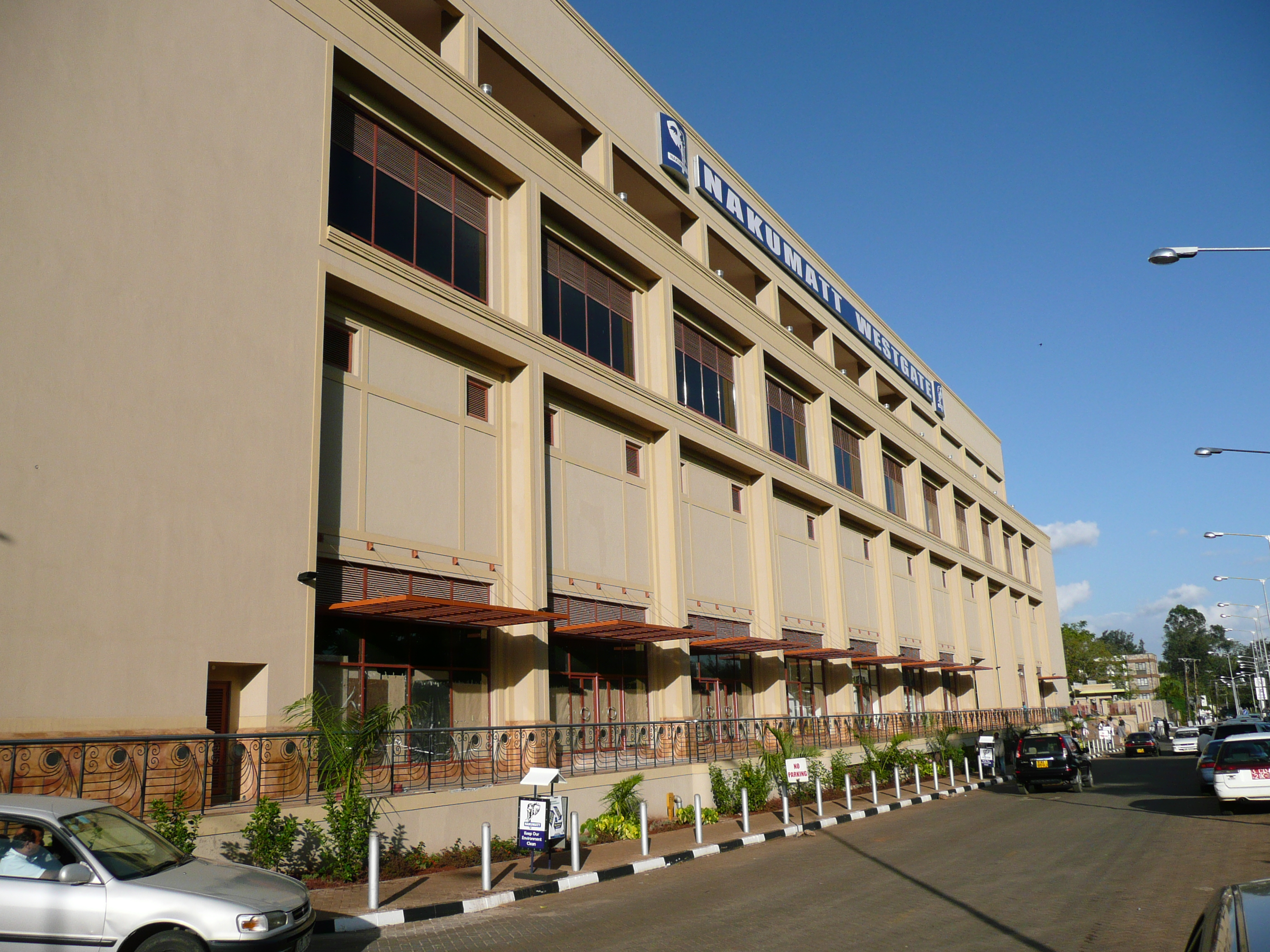
- Westgate Shopping Mall in July 2007
- Location: Nairobi, Kenya
- Coordinates: 1°15′25″S 36°48′12″E
- Address: Mwanzi Road, Westlands
- Opened: 2007; 18 July 2015 (reopening)
- Owner: Sony Holdings
- Num. of stores: 80+
- Floor area: 350,000 square feet (33,000 m^{2})
- Floors: 5
- Website: www.westgate.co.ke

Westgate Shopping Mall (also known as Westgate) is an upscale shopping mall located in the Westlands division of Nairobi, Kenya. It was first opened in 2007.

== Overview ==
The five-story mall opened in 2007 and included 350,000 square feet (33,000 m^{2}) of retail space and housed more than 90 stores. Nakumatt and Planet Media Cinemas anchored the mall. Other large units included Identity, Mr. Price Home, Artcaffe, and Barclays Bank on the ground floor, and Millionaires Casino on the second floor. Smaller units included outlets for international brands Adidas, Bata Shoes, CFC Stanbic Bank, Converse, FedEx, and Samsung Mobile.

The luxury shopping center was popular with Kenya's new consumer class, as well as foreign officials and expatriates.The mall is owned by an Israeli-Kenyan holding company called Sony Holdings headquartered in Tel Aviv.

== 2013 massacre ==
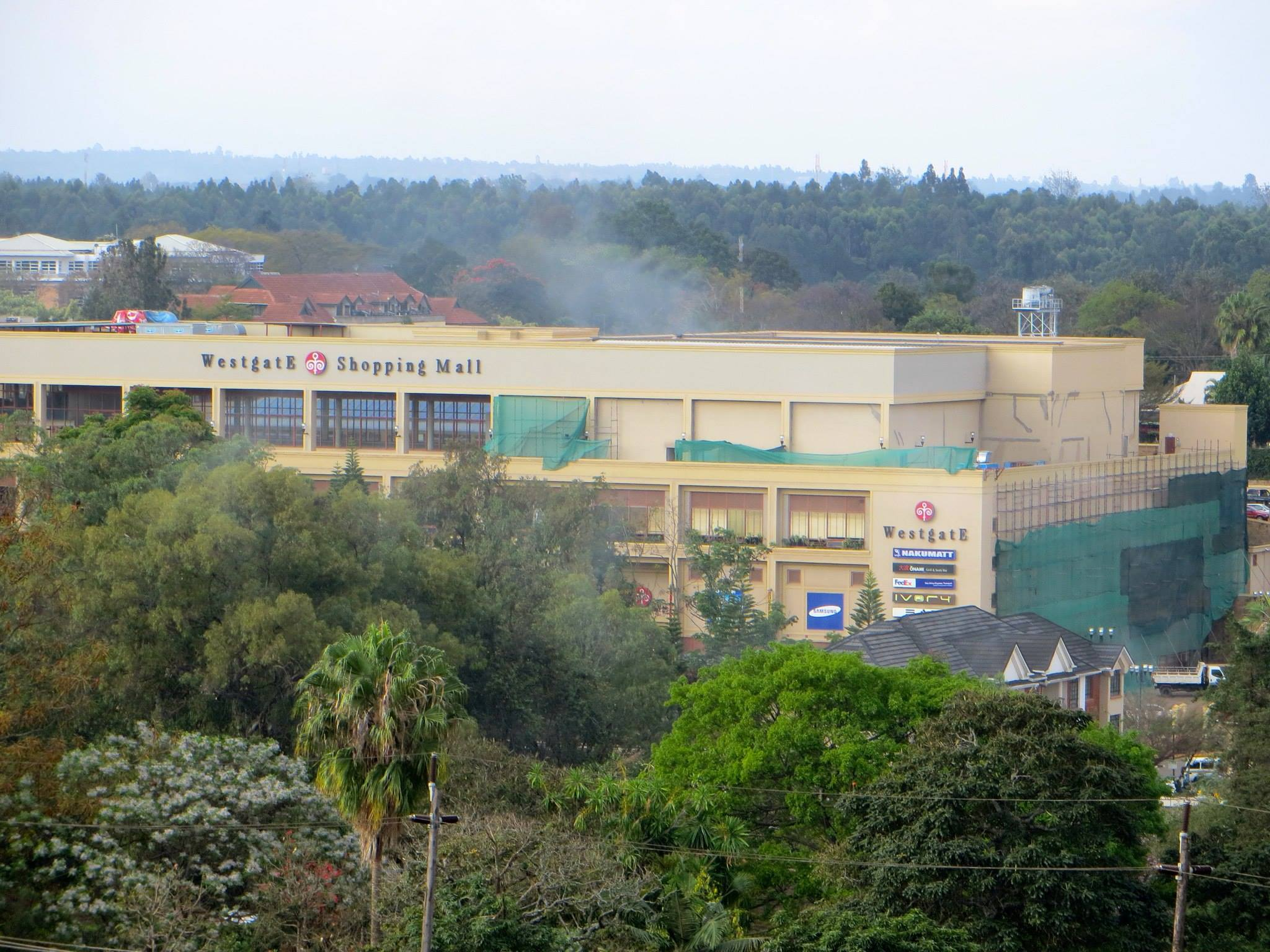
The mall on 23 September 2013

On 21 September 2013, a group of 4 terrorists associated with the al-Shabaab militant group wounded and killed customers, employees and visitors at the Westgate mall in an extended attack, using firearms and hand grenades. At least 68 people were reportedly killed, with over 200 injured. The terrorists held many customers hostage and it took four days to end the attack. By 25 September, three floors of the mall had collapsed because of it.

== Reopening ==
The mall reopened on 18 July 2015. Parts of the mall which were badly damaged in the terrorist attack underwent further reconstruction and remained closed until 2018. Legal proceedings with the insurer delayed reconstruction. About 90% of previous tenants of Westgate retained their leases, and IRG, an Israeli security company, was hired to train the mall's new security staff.

The mall's reopening was met with mixed reactions. Some hailed it as a demonstration of Nairobi's resilience in the face of terrorism, while others criticised it as disrespectful to the victims, suggesting that it should be converted to a memorial site or a place of worship instead.

== See also ==
- List of shopping malls in Kenya
- Islamic terrorism
