= List of New Zealand Police controversies =

New Zealand Police controversies

The following is a list of controversies involving the New Zealand Police. The New Zealand Police is perceived to have a minimal level of institutional corruption. However, throughout its history, the New Zealand Police has been the subject of a number of controversies. Some have been investigated by the Independent Police Conduct Authority; others have received significant publicity.

== Wrongful convictions Arthur Allan Thomas ==
Arthur Allan Thomas (born 2 January 1938) is a New Zealand man who was wrongfully convicted twice of the murders of Harvey and Jeannette Crewe in June 1971. Following revelations that crucial evidence against him had been faked by the police, in 1979 Thomas was granted a Royal Pardon.

In 1980, the Government ordered a Royal Commission of Inquiry into his convictions which concluded that Detective Inspector Bruce Hutton and Detective Len Johnston were responsible for planting the cartridge in the garden to incriminate Thomas. Thomas was subsequently awarded NZ$950,000 in compensation for his 9 years in prison and loss of earnings.

Mike Bush, then deputy Police Commissioner, described Hutton as having "integrity beyond reproach" at his funeral in 2013.

== The dawn raids ==
The dawn raids were crackdowns in New Zealand from 1973 to 1979 and then sporadically afterward on alleged illegal overstayers from the Pacific Islands. The raids were first introduced in 1973 by Prime Minister Norman Kirk's Labour government, who discontinued them in April 1974. However, they were later reintroduced and intensified by Rob Muldoon's Third National government. These operations involved special police squads conducting often aggressive raids on the homes and workplaces of overstayers throughout New Zealand, usually at dawn and almost exclusively directed at Pasifika New Zealanders, regardless of their citizenship status. Overstayers and their families were often prosecuted and then deported back to their countries.

== 1981 Springbok Tour ==
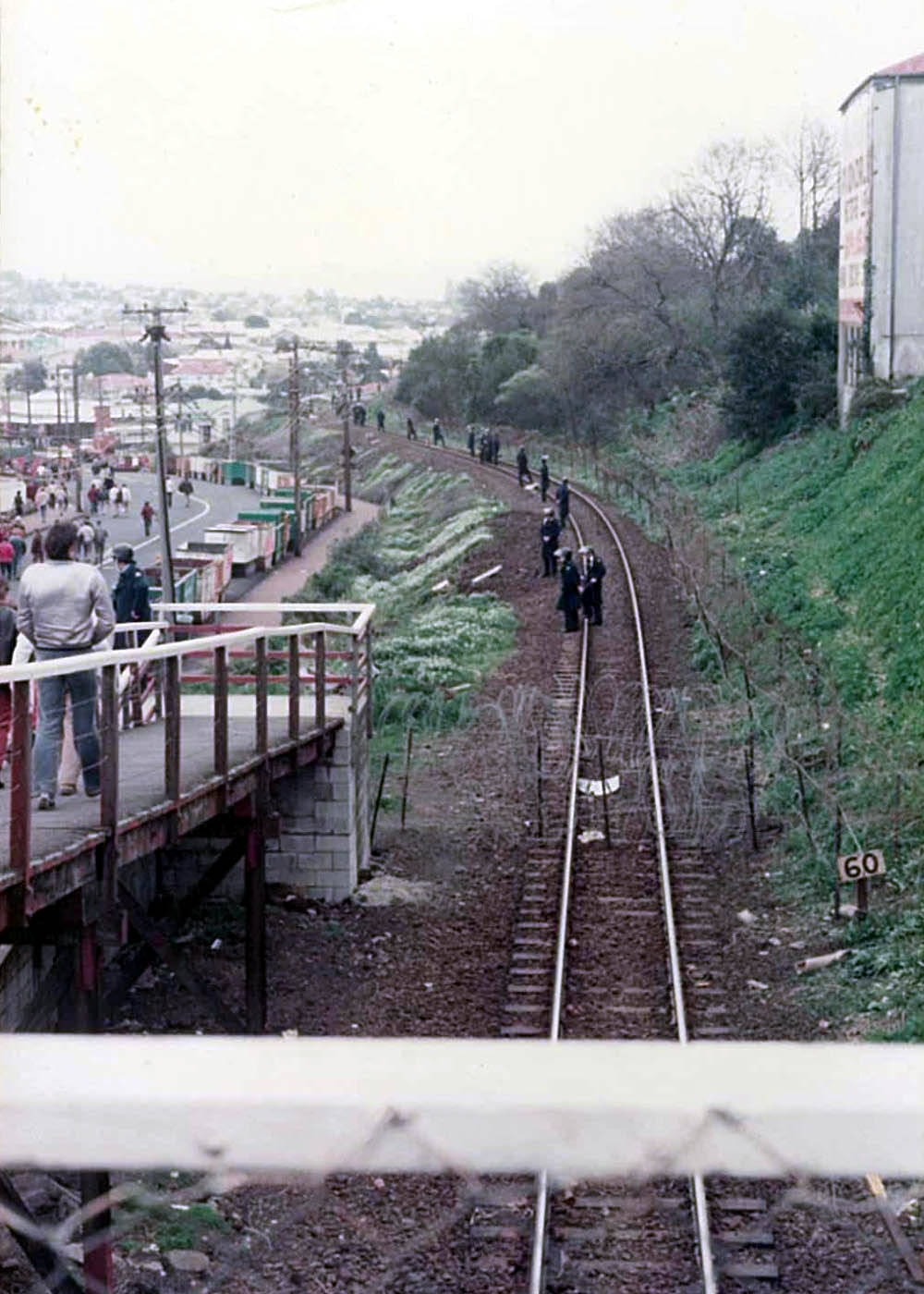
Police officers guarding a barbed wire perimeter around Eden Park near Kingsland railway station

The 1981 South Africa rugby union tour of New Zealand and the United States|1981 South African rugby tour, known in New Zealand as the 1981 Springbok Tour, and in South Africa as the Rebel Tour, polarised opinions and inspired widespread protests across New Zealand. The allegedly excessive police response to the protests also became a focus of controversy. Although the protests were among the most intense in New Zealand's recent history, no deaths or serious injuries resulted.

As protection for the Springboks, the police created two special riot squads, the Red and Blue Squads. These police were, controversially, the first in New Zealand to be issued with visored riot helmets and long batons (more commonly the side-handle baton). Some protesters were intimidated and interpreted this initial police response as overkill and heavy-handed tactics. After early disruptions, police began to require that all spectators assemble in sports grounds at least an hour before kick-off. While the protests were meant to be largely peaceful resistance to the Springbok tour, quite often there were "violent confrontations with rugby supporters and specially trained riot police."

Following several years of debate about police accountability in New Zealand, sparked in part by the role of Police during the 1981 Springbok Tour, the Police Complaints Authority was established on 1 April 1989 to act as an independent oversight body for police.

== Alan Hall ==
Alan Hall was convicted for the murder of Arthur Easton in 1985. His conviction, which was later overturned, has been described as one of New Zealand's worst miscarriages of justice. In August 2023, the Government agreed to pay him $5 million in compensation, the largest nominal payout for wrongful conviction in New Zealand history.

When Hall was arrested, police subjected him to lengthy interrogations, on one occasion for eight hours, and another for 15 hours, without a lawyer or support person present. It was later revealed that police and Crown prosecutors colluded in falsifying evidence and withholding mitigating evidence from the judge and the jury in order to secure a conviction.

In 2024, two police officers and a prosecutor were charged with perverting the course of justice, and a reward of $100,000 was offered for information leading to the conviction of the real murderer.

== 1989 Murder of Deane Fuller-Sandys and Leah Stephens ==
Deane Fuller-Sandys and Leah Stephens disappeared in Auckland, New Zealand, five days apart in August 1989. Stephens' remains were discovered in a forest three years later. Fuller-Sandys' body has never been found. In 1999, Gail Maney, Colin Maney, Stephen Stone, and Mark Henriksen were convicted in relation to the murders. The convictions of all four were overturned in October 2024 due to a miscarriage of justice caused by police misconduct including falsified evidence and police blackmailing key witnesses. Maney spent a total of 16 years in prison; Stone spent 26 years behind bars and was released on bail a few days after the convictions were overturned.

== Integrated National Crime Information System (INCIS) ==
The Integrated National Crime Information System (INCIS) was a computer software package developed by IBM in the early 1990s to provide improved information, investigation and analysis capabilities to the police. Deputy Police Commissioner, Barry Matthews, was responsible for its implementation and acknowledged that police requested 'hundreds and hundreds of changes' to the system as the programme was being developed. It never worked as required and ended up costing $130 million before it was finally abandoned in 2000.

The wasted resources and on-going problems surrounding the failure of the project were a huge distraction for the police. When it was about to be scrapped, Police Association president Greg O'Connor said "The reality of it is that the sooner ... the huge distraction that is Incis is gone, the better." Funding wasted on INCIS subsequently led to budget cuts in other areas so that infrastructure such as cars and communications centres were poorly resourced.

== Inadequate communications centre response ==
In 2004 and 2005, the police were criticised over several incidents in which callers to the Police Communications Centres, particularly those using the 111 emergency telephone number, received inadequate responses. In October 2004, the Commissioner of Police ordered an independent review into the communications centres under sustained political scrutiny after the Iraena Asher incident received a lot of publicity and a whistle-blowing employee resigned. On 11 May 2005, the Review Panel released its report which criticised the service for systemic failures and inadequate management. The report expressed ongoing concerns for public safety.

Police acted on the recommendations of the review with a number of initiatives, including increasing communications centre staff numbers and then initiating a demonstration project for a single non-emergency number centre, to reduce the load on the 111 service. The single non-emergency number 105 was launched on 10 May 2019.

== Historical sexual misconduct by police ==
In 2004, a number of historical sexual misconduct allegations dating from the 1980s were made against both serving and former police officers. In March 2006 assistant police commissioner Clinton Rickards and former police officers Brad Shipton and Bob Schollum were charged with raping and sexually abusing Louise Nicholas in Rotorua during the 1980s. The defendants claimed all sex was consensual and were found not guilty on 31 March 2006. In February 2007 the same three men faced historical charges of kidnapping and indecent assault for the pack rape of a 16-year-old girl with a whisky bottle that took place in the early 1980s, and again they were acquitted. Throughout both trials, the jury were unaware that Brad Shipton and Bob Schollum had been convicted of a previous pack rape in 2005 and were already serving prison sentences for this crime.

Rickards was forced to resign from the police but was paid $300,000 as part of his termination package. Complaints about inappropriate sexual behaviour by police officers led to a three-year inquiry conducted by Dame Margaret Bazley. Her highly critical report was released in 2007.

== Failures to investigate Wairarapa sexual abuse cases in 2008 ==
In 2008 there was a public scandal regarding the failure of police to investigate a backlog of sexual abuse cases in the Wairarapa. The head of the Masterton Criminal Investigation Bureau (CIB), Detective Senior Sergeant Mark McHattie, received an unspecified disciplinary outcome and has since been promoted to head of the Auckland CIB's serious crime unit.

== Covert spying on the public and activist groups ==
In 2008, the police's Special Investigation Group came under considerable media scrutiny after it was revealed Christchurch man Rob Gilchrist had been hired by officers to spy on individuals and organisations including Greenpeace, Iraq war protestors, student associations, unions, animal rights and climate change campaigners.

== David Lyttle framed for the murder of Brett Hall ==
David Lyttle was wrongfully convicted of murdering his friend of 30 years, Brett Hall, a convicted drug dealer who had spent time in prison. Hall went missing from his property north of Whanganui in May 2011, but his body has never been found.

Despite having no forensic evidence linking Lyttle to Hall's disappearance after four years of investigating, police initiated an undercover operation targeting Lyttle. The operation resulted in a false confession and no further forensic evidence to prove Lyttle's involvement in Hall's disappearance. Police further ignored a lead from an informant who claimed Hall was murdered during a drug deal, withheld evidence from Lyttle's defence team, and improperly delayed the disclosure process.

== 2012 Raid on Kim Dotcom ==
Acting upon a US Federal prosecutor's request, police arrested Kim Dotcom and three other Megaupload executives in a leased $30 million mansion at Coatesville near Auckland on Friday, 20 January 2012 (NZDT, UTC+13). This was pursuant to a request from the U.S. Federal Bureau of Investigation that the four be extradited for racketeering and money laundering.

To secure Dotcom's arrest, police executed an early morning raid that coincided with Dotcom's birthday celebration. The police armed, anti-terrorism Special Tactics Group was placed in charge of executing the raid, with police conducting warrantless surveillance of Dotcom's home including the unlawful placement and use of Covert listening devices. Between 40 and 80 police officers and support staff were involved in the raid, which was criticised for the excessive and overwhelming use of force involved. Dotcom later won an undisclosed settlement in a lawsuit against police for the tactics used in the raid in 2017.

== Inhumane treatment of youths held in police detention ==
The Independent Police Conduct Authority (IPCA) launched an investigation into the treatment of young people in police detention and in October 2012 issued a report which found that the number of young people being held has more than doubled since 2009. It said that "youths in crisis are being locked up in police cells and denied their human rights." Practices that "are, or risk being, inconsistent with accepted human rights" include: being held in solitary confinement; having cell lights on 24 hours a day; family members being prevented access; and not being allowed to see the doctor when they have medical or mental health problems. The IPCA made 24 recommendations into how police can improve the detention and treatment of young people in custody.

== The 2014 raid on Nicky Hager ==
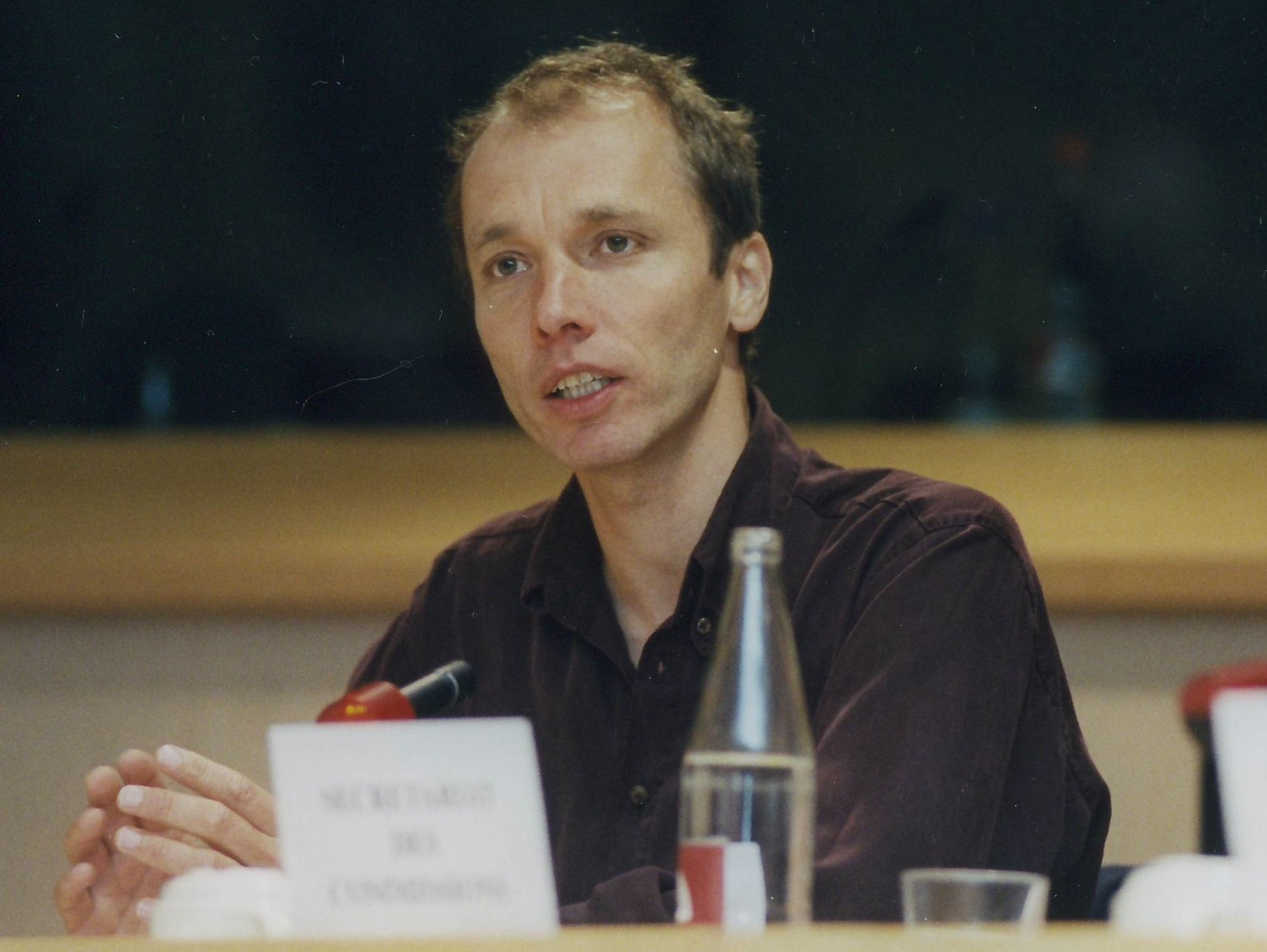
Investigative journalist Nicky Hager, whose books – most notably The Hollow Men and Dirty Politics – have explored several political scandals since the 1990s

In August 2014, investigative journalist and author Nicky Hager released a book titled Dirty Politics, which exposed inappropriate, aggressive, and borderline illegal conduct of a variety of senior New Zealand Government ministers and officials. The book included copies of private emails hacked from Cameron Slater, the son of former National Party president John Slater, who ran a blog called Whale Oil Beef Hooked (generally referred to as WhaleOil). Slater then complained to Police that he had been hacked.

On 2 October 2014, Police executed a 'general search warrant' (Note: A general warrant allows law enforcement officers to search and seize things without specifying exactly what they are looking for. General warrants were used in the past to arrest people for saying things the government did not like, but they have been outlawed in all common law jurisdictions as a result Semayne's case (1604) and later in Entick v Carrington.) on Hager's home in Wellington, seizing a number of personal items belonging to Hager and his family members, including USB storage devices, documents, CDs, phones and computers. The search lasted for over 10 hours. Police claimed to be looking for evidence proving the identity of a hacker known as Rawshark who had confidentially provided Hager with information for his book.

The search of Hager's home received widespread international criticism and were seen as a state-sponsored attack on press freedom. Hager filed a judicial review lawsuit in the High Court of the police search warrant. On 17 December 2015, the High Court in Wellington issued a judgment declaring the search warrant and search to be unlawful. An Independent Police Conduct Authority investigation was launched and concluded that the search warrant application practices used by police were also inadequate. In 2023, Hager was inducted an Officer of the New Zealand Order of Merit (ONZM) for his investigative journalism in connection with Dirty Politics.

== Constable Vili Taukolo convicted of corruption ==
Between February 2018 and March 2019, Auckland constable Vili Taukolo acted as a paid informant for organised crime groups, reportedly passing on police intelligence and other information in exchange for payments of up to $10,000 each. Taukolo also sold classified intelligence to offenders and their associates involved in the $50 million Mexican drug cartel methamphetamine bust in 2017 known as Operation Grandeur. Vili Taukolo was convicted of corruption and sentenced to 2.5 years in prison.

=== Establishment of the Police National Integrity Unit ===
In response to the Vili Taukolo case, Police Commissioner Mike Bush established the 'National Integrity Unit (NIU) in 2020 to investigate corruption within New Zealand Police. The NIU was initially comprised 12 staff, led by a detective inspector and is based in Wellington.

== Use of excessive force against, and the wrongful detention of, Daniel Bond ==
On 2 May 2019, Daniel Bond was having alcoholic drinks with a friend in a parked Campervan that he was living in. Police officers stopped, suspecting Bond was about to drive while intoxicated. The officer improperly demanded Bond's personal details, to which Bond refused and began recording the confrontation on his phone. The officer aggressively took the phone out of Bond's hand, and proceeded to lunge at him in a takedown effort as Bond yelled demanding the officer's badge number. The situation quickly devolved, and Bond was pepper sprayed, badly beaten while on the ground, strip-searched, and wrongfully detained by 9 other officers who were called to the scene. Officers also executed an unlawful warrantless search of Bond's vehicle. Bond was charged with assault on a police officer but the charges were subsequently withdrawn.

Bond filed a complaint with the Independent Police Conduct Authority (IPCA), who found multiple deficiencies in the police investigation against Bond. Judge Colin Doherty, Chair of the IPCA deemed Bond's arrest, detainment, and the excessive use of force by police to be unlawful. Bond filed 23 criminal charges in a private prosecution (Note: Unlike most common law jurisdictions, prosecutors in New Zealand are not independent from police nor are they elected, but are instead employees of Police and answerable to police officers. A lack of prosecutorial independence creates a prosecuting environment which creates the opportunity for widespread abuse of power and malicious prosecution.) against the officers involved. Bond's case was dismissed by an Auckland District Court Judge after several prosecution deficiencies with his case.

== The 2019 death of Allen Ball while in custody ==
On 31 May 2019, police officers were called to a domestic violence incident at a home in the Taranaki region. Sergeant Sandra Ilene Shaw, Probationary Constable Corey Steven Waite and Constable Craig Michael Longworth, of the Hāwera police station responded. Upon arrival, officers encounted 55-year-old Australian-born Allen Ball, who reportedly consumed 1 liter of bourbon whiskey, allegedly assaulted his partner and threatened to harm himself before leaving the house. Police found him a short time later after arriving on the scene. When asked by the officers, Ball denied that he consumed anything other than alcohol.

Ball was arrested and taken to Hāwera Police Station. During the journey, Ball became unresponsive while being spoken to by police. He remained unresponsive on arrival to the police station and needed six people to carry him into the station where he was left on a cell floor at around midnight. Officers at the police station repeatedly ignored automated computer messages reminding them to check in on Ball. Ball was left unattended for over two hours before officers returned to discover that Ball's health had deteriorated. Officers performed CPR and called an ambulance, however, Ball was pronounced dead a short time later. A later investigation revealed that Ball was already dead when officers started CPR.

In June 2020, after a police investigation of Ball's death, the three arresting officers were placed on leave and charged with manslaughter on the grounds that the officers were derelict in their duty of care. It was revealed at trial that Ball's cause of death was the result of extremely high levels of codeine and tramadol, in addition to alcohol toxicity. The matter was also investigated by the Independent Police Conduct Authority. Ball's siblings, who lived in Australia, flew to New Zealand for a three-week trial in the High Court of New Zealand in New Plymouth where the officers were acquitted on 3 June 2021.

In December 2021, the Independent Police Conduct Authority released a report finding that the arresting officers had objectively failed in their duty of care to Ball, and recommended changes to police practices when dealing with persons in custody who appear to be in medical distress, however the report's release was intentionally delayed until after trial. In 2023, the coroner's office decided to decline investigating Ball's death. Police closed their employment investigation in 2023, following the coroner's decision, and likewise declined to take any further action.

== Racially targeted warrantless photos of minors ==
In 2021, police were accused of racially profiling Māori, particularly minors, by taking photos of any youth apprehended during the course of patrols or who police arbitrarily considered "suspicious" using a police mobile app called "OnDuty" which was connected to the National Intelligence Application (NIA) system. Police claimed the photos were a necessary part of combatting crime through more effective intelligence sharing.

Public complaints and media coverage of the ongoing issue led to a joint inquiry of the Independent Police Conduct Authority and the Office of the Privacy Commissioner (OPC) in 2022. The report found the police's unlawful surveillance photos and biometric data collection tactics were widespread, included warrantless photos and videos, fingerprinting minors who had not been charged with a crime, and that police officers had threatened minors with arrest for not complying. The report also revealed serious issues relating to the storage, retention, and disposal of the unlawfully collected material and a lack of any police policy around safeguarding the data.

The OPC issued a Compliance Notice to Police, ordering them to stop the unlawful collection of personal data and to delete all unlawfully collected data stored in police systems, and providing a deadline of July 2024 to comply. Police failed to meet this deadline, citing poor data management practices (first outlined in the OPC report as being problematic and unlawful) as the reason for the delay. Police were given an extension until mid-2025 to comply, however Police have missed this deadline as well citing a lack of funding for technologies that would allow them to delete unlawfully obtained evidence.

== Use of controversial CIPEM interview technique ==
Following the dismissal of a number of homicide cases at trial, it was revealed that police had coaxed wrongful confessions from suspects using a controversial and secret interview technique known as Complex Investigation Phased Engagement Model (CIPEM). CIPEM was developed by Detective Superintendent Tom Fitzgerald, head of the Criminal Investigation Branch, and has been in use since 2019 but was kept secret from the public until 2022. Similar to the PEACE method of interrogation, CIPEM involves creating a more relaxed than normal interviewing style in order to build rapport with suspects. However, the technique also involves misleading and manipulative practices which have been ruled unlawful by the High Court of New Zealand.

CIPEM was attributed to a false confession by a suspect in relation to the unsolved murder of Lois Tolley. High Court Justice Simon France ruled the confession to be inadmissible in court due to being improperly obtained. France determined the interviews to be "a sustained pursuit of a particular truth" and described the use of the CIPEM technique as "manipulation" and "nonsense." Detective Superintendent Tom Fitzgerald's dismissive public reaction to the High Court ruling as "mere opinion" triggered an in-depth investigation by journalists from Stuff.

The investigative reporting that followed led to extensive media coverage and public scrutiny of the CIPEM technique. In October 2022, Tom Fitzgerald retired from police amid the controversy, and police had renamed the CIPEM technique as PEACE Plus. Following a number of public complaints about CIPEM, and after repeated interview requests by Stuff journalists to Police Commissioner Andrew Coster, the Independent Police Conduct Authority (IPCA) launched an investigation into police use of CIPEM.

It was later revealed that police attempted to conceal internal emails related to CIPEM from Official Information Act requests in order to hide Tom Fitzgerald's involvement in CIPEM interviews or other officer's doubts about the technique's efficacy. As of May 2024, the IPCA investigation is still ongoing.

== 2022 Wellington protest and occupation of Parliament ==
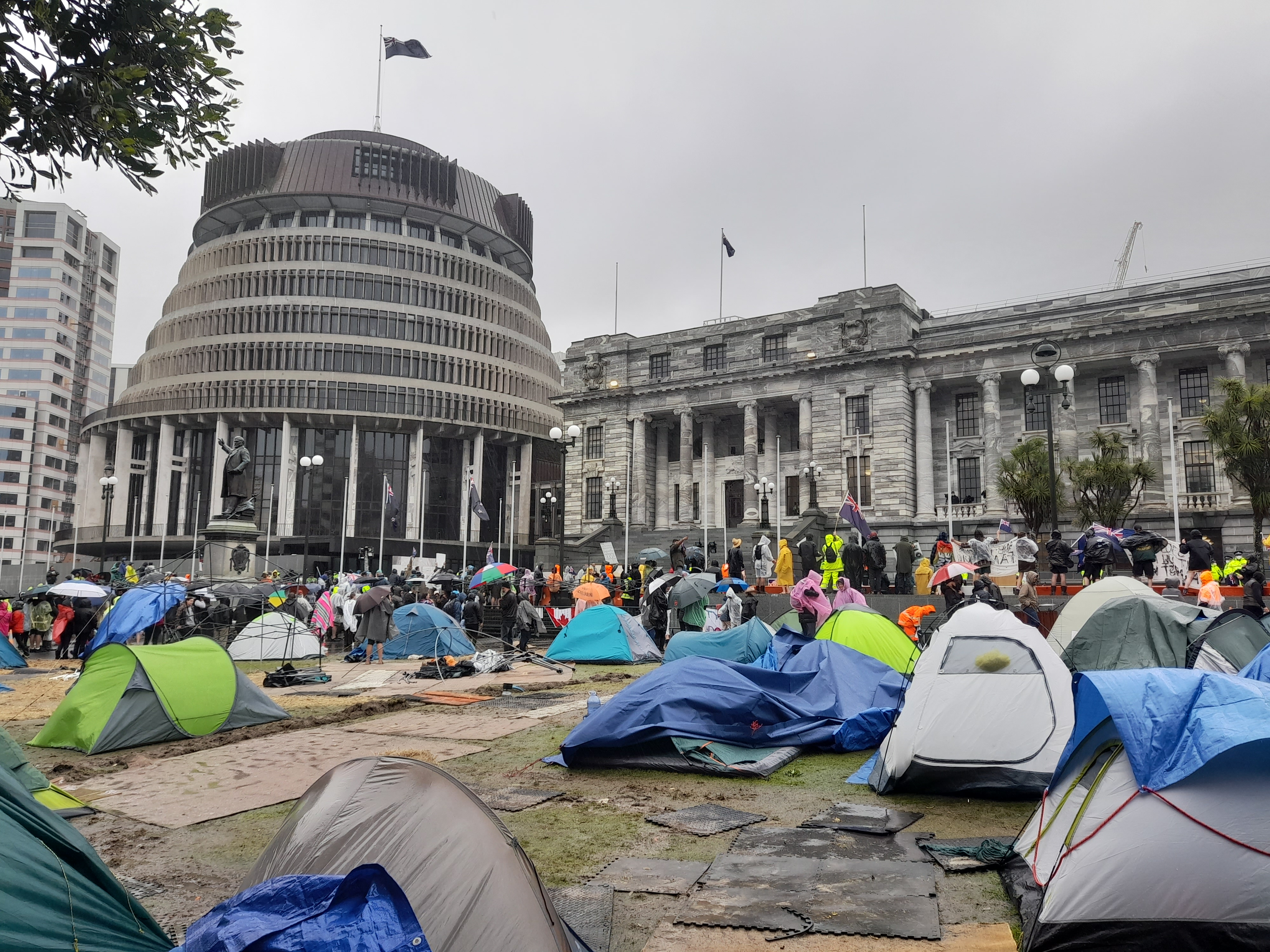
Protesters and their tents in front of Parliament in Wellington on 13 February 2022

The 2022 Wellington protest and occupation of Parliament was an anti-mandate and anti-lockdown occupation of the grounds of Parliament House and Molesworth Street in Central Wellington during the peak of the COVID-19 pandemic. For 24 days spanning 6 February 2022 - 2 March 2022, an estimated 1,000 people occupied parliamentary grounds, blockaded surrounding roads, and established a makeshift tent camp on the parliamentary grounds until Police forcibly dispersed the protestors. On the final day of the occupation, protesters set fire to tents and other camping gear as police moved to disperse the remaining protesters.

Many within New Zealand expressed anger with the long time it took the police to restore order and end the harassment of the public by the protesters. Others criticised the police commissioner Andrew Coster for his lengthy focus on de-escalation, despite the protesters being highly decentralised and overwhelmingly unwilling to negotiate. On 24 March 2022, the Independent Police Conduct Authority (IPCA) announced it had received nearly 1,900 complaints about the way the police handled the protest and that it would undertake an investigation. Many of the complaints came from people who were not present at the protests.

On 29 June 2022, documents released under the Official Information Act 1982 showed that the Police had deployed two long-range acoustic devices (LRADs) during the forced removal of the protesters on the last day of their occupation of Parliament's grounds. LRADs are controversial since they can emit a sound level of 140 decibels, causing permanent hearing damage.

In total, 40 Police officers were injured during the protests and a total of 220 people were arrested in relation to the protest. Over one-third of the 2,309 Police personnel deployed to deal with the protest and occupation have sought mental health support services to deal with emotional trauma encountered during the protest.

On 14 December 2023, the IPCA released its report into the 1,905 complaints related to the Parliament protest and occupation. The report confirmed six incidents of excessive force by Police; with three cases being justified and two being deemed excessive.

== Murder of Farzana Yaqubi ==
In December 2022, 21 year old AUT law student and New Zealand-born daughter of Afghan refugees, Farzana Yaqubi, was fatally stabbed in Auckland by Kanwarpal Singh. For two months prior to her murder, Yaquibi made multiple reports to police expressing an extreme fear for her safety regarding a man who was sending her threatening messages, including threats of violence, harassing her, and stalking her outside her home and place of work. However, police failed to investigate or action her complaints, with Yaqubi receiving a letter from police stating that her matter is undergoing "further assessment" two days after she was murdered.

An IPCA investigation published in 2024 highlighted a variety of mis-steps taken by police with regards to Yaqubi's complaints, as well as systemic shortcomings within police for handling complaints of stalking and harassment.

A 2024 short docudrama film titled The Man Outside was released, depicting events similar to those experienced by Farzana Yaqubi. The film's director, Liv McClymont, said the film was inspired in part by the events surrounding Yaqubi's murder and the police's failure to act.

=== Stalking and Harassment Amendment Bill ===
At the time of Yaqubi's murder, stalking was not a criminal offense in New Zealand and the aftermath of her murder and the IPCA's 2024 report led to widespread calls in New Zealand for amending the Crimes Act 1961 to include stalking. In May 2024, the Auckland Women's Centre sent an open letter to Justice Minister Paul Goldsmith with over 7,000 public signatures petitioning for the law change. As a result, in November 2025, the New Zealand Parliament passed the Crimes Legislation (Stalking and Harassment) Amendment Act into law.

== Violations of the UN Convention Against Torture ==
As part of a periodic review in 2023, the United Nations Committee Against Torture published findings that suggested New Zealand's justice system is failing to meet human rights standards as set out in the United Nations Convention Against Torture, including the low age of criminal liability, high number of instances of children as young as 14 being remanded to detention, the use of spit hoods against children under the age of 18, continued excessive use of isolation in places of detention, and the disproportionate harm to Māori in places of detention. Despite calls from government watchdogs and media coverage surrounding these issues, none have been substantially addressed by police or through legislation.

=== Alo Ngata's death ===
On 27 August 2020, the Independent Police Conduct Authority criticised the Police's handling of the detention of Alo Ngata, who died in police custody in July 2018 after he had been incorrectly fitted with a spit hood. Ngata had been arrested for assaulting an elderly pensioner named Mike Reilly in Auckland's Freemans Bay and had violently resisted arrest. While the IPCA considered the Police's use of force to be reasonable, they found that the police had failed to assess his well-being while in custody. Both Ngata and Reilly's family have asked the police to release footage from the Police helicopter showing Ngata assaulting Reilly.

== Officer's indecent exposure at train station ==
In September 2024, an off-duty police officer was caught engaging in "consensual sexual activity" inside a parked car at Paremata train station. The sexual activity was plainly visible to members of the public, including children, from a footbridge which crossed the parking lot to the train platform. Police received complaints about the incident, and a criminal investigation commenced alongside an Independent Police Conduct Authority (IPCA) investigation. Both investigating officer and the IPCA found enough evidence of wrongdoing to commence a prosecution of the officer, however police declined to prosecute and the officer was never named or held accountable.

== Alleged sexual misconduct by Deputy Commissioner Jevon McSkimming ==
In November 2024, New Zealand's second-highest-ranking officer, Deputy commissioner Jevon McSkimming, was suspended with full pay pending a criminal investigation led by the Independent Police Conduct Authority (IPCA) regarding allegations of sexual misconduct with a junior female non-sworn member of police staff, who was 20 years younger, with whom he was having a sexual relationship. The relationship lasted two years, and 'ended badly' in 2018. Over the next five years, the woman (subsequently identified by the IPCA as Ms Z) sent over 300 emails to McSkimming making numerous allegations of sexual misconduct.

An internal police report from February 2024 recommended referring emails sent by Ms Z to the National Integrity Unit and to the IPCA as they allegedly contained potential criminal and Police Code of Conduct concerns relating to McSkimming. However no referrals were made and instead Ms Z was charged by police under the Harmful Digital Communications Act 2015.

In 2024, before these allegations came to light, McSkimming was shortlisted for the role of Police Commissioner weeks before being suspended, ultimately losing to Richard Chambers, who was appointed on 25 November 2024.

=== IPCA report ===
The IPCA report into the allegations of sexual misconduct was released on 11 November 2025. According to the IPCA it took four months for the correct officer known as Officer D to be assigned to the investigation and before Officer D was assigned, no one read Ms Z's emails and she was not even interviewed.

The initial investigation was closed by the Assistant Commissioner of Investigations in September 2024, and only in October 2024 after a request from the chair of the IPCA following concerns about the initial investigation did police refer Ms Z's complaint and launch Operation Jefferson: A criminal investigation into her complaints of multiple sexual offence allegations, including sexual violation by rape, sexual violation by unlawful sexual connection, and indecent assault. Even though not enough evidence was found to prosecute, the IPCA revealed a number of other allegations, including misuse of a police credit card, inappropriate use of police property for sexual gain and threatening to release an intimate video of Ms Z if she made any complaints.

Officer D said the handling of the investigation prior to her involvement had been "appalling." The IPCA described the investigation as a "subset of [Ms Z's] prosecution" instead of an independent investigation to determine whether there was any truth to her allegations.

The IPCA concluded that senior police officers interfered with the investigation in a way, so as to not jeopardize McSkimming's potential appointment as the next Commissioner of Police. It went on to say there was serious misconduct by police leadership, including from former Commissioner of Police Andrew Coster who failed to disclose to the Public Service Commission his knowledge of McSkimming's relationship and alleged misconduct with the woman known as Ms Z.

=== Senior officers implicated ===
On 12 November 2025, RNZ identified five senior Police executives who were implicated in the IPCA's investigation into the cover-up of the sexual misconduct allegations against McSkimming. These figures included former Deputy Commissioner Tania Kura, former Assistant Commissioner Paul Basham (referred to in the IPCA report as ("Assistant Commissioner A"), Detective Superintendent Chris Page ("Officer B"), Firearms Safety Authority executive director Angela Brazier ("Ms G"), and former Deputy Commissioner People, Leadership and Culture Chris de Wattignar ("Deputy Commissioner PLC").

- Kura had failed to "make robust enquiries" into Ms Z's allegations and relied too heavily on McSkimming's account.
- Basham had failed to follow police policy and procedures when investigating Ms Z's allegations against McSkimming.
- Page had led the Police prosecution against Ms Z for harassment against McSkimming but had failed to ensure a separate parallel investigation into Ms Z's complaints against McSkimming.
- During McSkimming's appointment process for the position of Assistant Commissioner in October 2025, Brazier had failed to disclose to the Public Service Commissioner that he was involved in an extramarital affair, that he was allegedly being harassed by Ms Z and that Kura had investigated McSkimming as part of the Police response.
- The IPCA also found that de Wattignar had failed to exercise independent judgment and take disciplinary action against McSkimming, relying too much on Coster and Kura's assurances despite concerns about McSkimming's behaviour from "Officer M."

=== Official responses ===
In a press conference after the IPCA report was released Police Commissioner, Richard Chambers, said he accepted all of the IPCA reports recommendations and later confirmed he had appointed an independent King's Counsel to conduct employment investigations and that he was conducting a refresh of the police executive. Chambers stated that a revision of the police code of conduct aimed at strengthening accountability, strengthening the role of the Integrity and Conduct Unit and an uplift of six investigators for the National Integrity Unit are a part of that refresh. he also apologised to Ms Z "for the repeated early failures in following the proper processes for investigating this matter by those at such a senior level of Police. You asked for help. You were badly let down."

Richard Chambers and Minister of Police, Mark Mitchell, also thanked officers who, "did stand up and challenge what was happening here. I thank them for their courage, for the leadership and the integrity they showed in doing so”.

Attorney General Judith Collins announced that the Public Service Commission (PSC) had commissioned an independent review into its appointment process. She said the government would implement, "the strongest statutory oversight mechanism available to it, an Inspector General of Police".

== Possession of objectionable material by Deputy Commissioner Jevon McSkimming ==
When the Police finally investigated Ms Z's complaints against McSkimming, they found pornographic images on his phone and work laptop. He resigned in May 2025. He was arrested on 27 June 2025, and charged with possession of objectionable material, including child sexual abuse material and bestiality, a charge which can carry a maximum sentence of 10 years. His name suppression lapsed on 4 August 2025.

On 6 November 2025, McSkimming pleaded guilty to three charges of possessing objectionable publications. The first charge was related to 812 images involving adult bestiality material, the second charge was related to 68 images involving child sexual exploitation material and the third charge was related to 2,065 images with a 37% child sexual exploitation and 63% bestiality split average. McSkimming used Google searches over 5,000 times since the earliest retrievable record in July 2020, where he would often look for artificially-generated material which referenced underage girls, incest, animals with keywords such as "slave" and "abuse". He accessed the objectionable material during work hours. From July 2024, 7% of all searches on McSkimming's devices were intended or highly likely to return objectionable material.

=== Official response ===
In a statement after McSkimming's court appearance, Police Commissioner Richard Chambers said "The prosecution of Mr Jevon McSkimming shows no member of the Police is above the law, no matter how senior".

After McSkimming's resignation, concerns on how McSkimming was able to access the alleged child exploitation and bestiality material, prompted Chambers to order an independent "rapid review" into police information security (INFOSEC). Chambers wanted to ensure police had appropriate controls to prevent and detect misuse of police devices to stop staff from being able to "exploit vulnerabilities to access inappropriate content". The report found that police's current systems were "inconsistent", "inadequate," and "insufficient". In response, Chambers announced police would bring back six-monthly audits of data and internet usage on devices.

On 19 November police announced that 20 staff members had been placed under investigation as part of the review of police-issued devices. Within a week, three were cleared as work-related searches. By late November 2025, six individuals had been stood down, including a senior detective who was reported to be facing a criminal investigation. By 23 February 2026, Deputy Commissioner Jill Rogers confirmed that Police had investigated a total of 18 cases, with five staff being stood down and three other staffers leaving the Police.

== Falsification of 42,000 breath tests ==
In October 2025 it was revealed that around 120 police officers were being investigating after 30,961 alcohol breath tests were "falsely or erroneously recorded". On 22 May 2026 a WSP report found 12,000 additional "irregular" alcohol breath tests totalling 42,678 "falsely or erroneously recorded" alcohol breath tests. According to a memo sent to police staff, in August 2025 the Intelligence and Performance team within the National Road Policing Centre identified "an anomaly in data relating to breath testing activity" during routine audit of 4.6 million alcohol breath tests, between July 2024 and 30 September 2025. The audit indicated some police staff were recording breath screening tests that hadn't occurred. Acting deputy commissioner Michael Johnson has said that around 120 police officers are now facing "further scrutiny under a disciplinary process which is underway" and that the incident is "incredibly disappointing and concerning". In November 2025 all police officers were required to undergo additional online training on alcohol breath testing. Following the initial report the NZ Transport Agency Waka Kotahi temporarily withheld NZ$12 million in funding, however this was later resorted after the agency was satisfied police had meet their testing targets.

== Political candidacy of Superintendent Rakesh Naidoo ==
In the lead-up to the 2026 New Zealand general election, Superintendent Rakesh Naidoo announced that he was standing as a candidate for the New Zealand Labour Party. Police Minister Mark Mitchell expressed disappointment that Naidoo had not notified his supervisors earlier, and voiced unfounded concerns, providing no evidence to support them, as to whether Naidoo had shared "sensitive information" on government policy with the Labour Party. Commissioner Richard Chambers stated that Naidoo would be investigated by police and required to take leave rather than conduct his usual duties. Former race relations commissioner Joris de Bres questioned whether the decision to stand down and investigate Naidoo was politically motivated. Fleur Fitzsimmons of the Public Service Association described the move to investigate Naidoo as an overreaction and that he had the right to be politically active outside of work.

== See also ==
- Police misconduct
- List of political scandals in New Zealand
- List of miscarriage of justice cases § New Zealand
