= Richard Chambers (police officer) =

New Zealand police officer (born 1972)

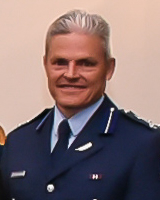
- Chambers in 2019

35th Commissioner of Police
- Incumbent
- Assumed office 25 November 2024
- Preceded by: Andrew Coster; Tania Kura (interim)

Personal details
- Born: Richard Preston Chambers; 1972 (age 53–54) Auckland, New Zealand
- Spouse: Kim
- Children: 2
- Parent: Roger Chambers (father)
- Education: University of Auckland (BCom)

Richard Preston Chambers (born 1972) is a New Zealand police officer who has been the Commissioner of Police having succeeded Andrew Coster on 25 November 2024.

== Early life ==
As a child, Chambers had ambitions of joining the police and owned an imitation police helmet at the age of five. He father was Auckland barrister Roger Chambers.

== Career ==
=== Police career ===
Chambers joined the New Zealand Police in 1996 working as a constable based at Avondale Police station. He was quickly promoted through various ranks including that of detective and inspector. In 1998, Chambers joined the Criminal Investigation Branch and later became a detective.

In 2005, Chambers was promoted to Inspector at the National Police Headquarters in Wellington. In 2007, he was appointed to a senior role as Area Commander for Lower Hutt and continued with other top roles in the Tasman and Southern districts before a stint in Auckland City.

In 2016, Chambers was promoted to the position of Assistant Commissioner, leading investigations into serious and organised crime, and financial crime. He then held a key position during the COVID-19 pandemic in New Zealand and was tasked with co-leading police response. During the 2022 Wellington protests in March 2022, Chambers defended the use of force by Police to restore order, stating that officers had done an "incredible job in very challenging circumstances."

=== Interpol posting ===
During the 2020s, Chambers served in a senior role at Interpol in France, but subsequently signalled his intention to return to New Zealand. According to 1News journalist John Campbell, Chambers was involved in an Interpol operation that seized 56 tonnes of cocaine, fifteen planes and a submarine.

=== Police Commissioner, 2024–present ===
On 20 November 2024, Police Minister Mark Mitchell announced Chambers had been appointed to the role of Commissioner, following the early departure of former commissioner Andrew Coster to assume the role of chief executor of the Social Investment Agency. Chambers replaced the interim commissioner Tania Kura on 25 November. Chambers was picked ahead of Deputy Commissioner Jevon McSkimming. Following his appointment, Chambers identified core policing, police safety (including body cameras and tactical equipment) and regaining public trust as "core priorities" of his leadership.

On 26 November, Chambers confirmed plans to open a new police station in Auckland's Federal Street near Aotea Square and the new CRL station.

In late January 2025, Chambers proposed cutting 17 executive-level Police roles and creating 20 new roles as part of a restructure of the Police leadership. Chambers denied that scrapping an executive role focusing on Māori iwi (tribe) and communities would diminish the Police's engagement with Māori, Pasifika and ethnic communities. In mid February 2025, Chambers said that the restructure would allow the Police to reinvest cost savings into frontline roles while spreading executive responsibilities.

In late May 2025, Chambers rescinded a March 2025 memo instructing Police officers not to investigate "lower value" thefts, petrol drive-offs, shoplifting and fraud crimes following media coverage. Chambers described the earlier memo as "confusing and unhelpful," and reiterated the Police's commitment to combating retail crime.

In November 2025, following the release of a report by the Independent Police Conduct Authority (IPCA) identifying serious misconduct by senior members of the New Zealand Police during the tenure of former Commissioner Andrew Coster, Chambers publicly condemned the actions of his predecessors. The IPCA report found that senior officers, including Coster, mishandled sexual-offending complaints against then–Deputy Commissioner Jevon McSkimming, delaying referral to the authority and attempting to influence the investigation.

Chambers described the situation as “a total lack of leadership and integrity at the highest levels of the New Zealand Police,” calling it “a sad and dark day” for the organisation. He said that he had been briefed on the McSkimming matter only days before becoming Commissioner and had “absolutely no knowledge of the situation” beforehand. Chambers stated that he was relieved many of those involved were no longer with Police and pledged to rebuild public trust with a new leadership team.

In interviews following the report, Chambers rejected suggestions that the scandal represented a systemic failure within the Police, instead describing it as the misconduct of “a small group of former leaders.” He maintained that the public could continue to have confidence in the Police as an institution, while acknowledging the behaviour described in the report as “a disgrace.”

In late June 2026, Police Minister Mitchell referred two complaints against Chambers for misconduct against women to the Independent Police Conduct Authority (IPCA) and the Police National Integrity Unit. Chambers denied the allegations and said he would cooperate with the investigation. He remains in office during the course of the two investigations.

== Views and positions ==
In November 2024, Chambers expressed disagreement with his predecessor Coster's policy of policing by consent, stating:

I don't talk about policing by consent. I talk about trust and confidence, and it is fundamentally important that the police have the trust and confidence of the public, and we've got some work to do at the moment.

Chambers has also expressed support for enforcing the Gangs Act 2024, which banned gang patches.

== See also ==
- List of New Zealand Police controversies

Police appointments
Preceded by Tania Kura (interim)	Commissioner of Police; 2024–present
