= Howard Broad =

New Zealand commissioner of Police

Howard Broad CNZM
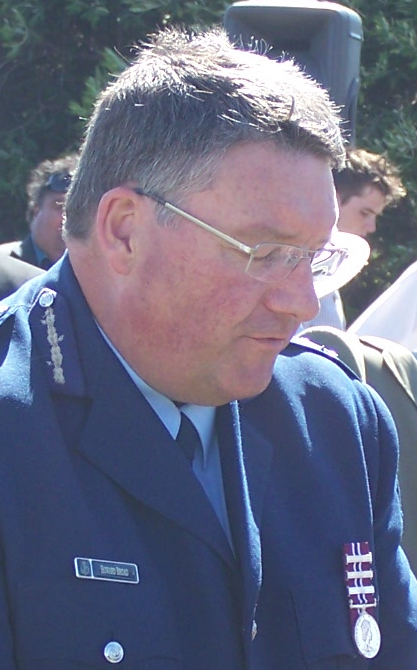
- Broad in 2010

30th Commissioner of Police (New Zealand)
- In office 4 April 2006 – 3 April 2011
- Preceded by: Steve Long (acting)
- Succeeded by: Peter Marshall

Personal details
- Born: Howard George Broad; 1957 (age 68–69)

Howard George Broad CNZM (born 1957) is a New Zealand public servant who served as the thirtieth Commissioner of Police, from 2006 to 2011. He is a former career police officer, working in uniform and as a detective for eighteen years, before moving into senior roles at the Police National Headquarters in Wellington. As commissioner, he successfully completed rewriting the policing law, the introduction of tasers, and survived a number of controversies in the media.

Broad has an LLB degree from the Victoria University of Wellington, and was admitted as a barrister and solicitor of the High Court of New Zealand. He joined the police as a cadet in 1975, and was a beat officer for two years before entering the CIB. He has certificates in Police Management from New Zealand, Canada, and the United States. In the 2011 Queen's Birthday Honours, Broad was made a Companion of the New Zealand Order of Merit, for services as Commissioner of Police.

== District Commander ==
Broad was District Commander of Auckland City Police District from 1998 to 2003. In June 1999 he surprised colleagues by revealing details of his contract, which included performance-based portion of −5 to +8 percent.

Auckland Mayor Christine Fletcher was sent a suspicious letter featuring a photo of a woman wielding a pistol and containing two lumps in October 2000. Broad personally took charge of the case, and checked with the mayor if she had received any other threatening communications. The letter turned out to be a false alarm, after being x-rayed police deemed it safe to open, and discovered a theatre invitation and lollies. In December that year the Minister of Police George Hawkins told 57 Auckland police including Broad to return their cellphones, as part of a cost-cutting exercise. Police Association president Greg O'Connor, and opposition police spokesman Brian Neeson, who suggested police would next be sharing teabags, derided the move.

For his work as the principal law enforcement member with Netsafe, the national multi-agency Internet safety programme, the Society for the Policing of Cyberspace (Canada) named him the 2002 inaugural winner of the International Law Enforcement Award.

He managed large security operations in Auckland, including the 11th APEC meeting (requiring protection of the President of the United States), and Operation Marlin II for the 2003 America's Cup in Auckland.

Broad received a six-month secondment to the Home Office Police Standards Unit in London from September 2003 to March 2004, where he studied British policing procedures and technology, including a vehicle registration plate identification system.

== Commissioner ==
Minister of Police Annette King announced Broad's appointment as Commissioner of Police on 4 April 2006, succeeding acting commissioner Steve Long, and with the support of opposition politicians. The government tasked him with rewriting the Police Act 1958, which was realised on 1 October 2008 with the Policing Act 2008. He stated one of his goals as commissioner would be restoring public confidence in the police, and that youth gangs were an "area of opportunity" to prevent future crime.

Broad launched the Police Electronic Crime Laboratory in Wellington on 24 September 2007, with a cellphone text message. He said "Crime is being increasingly committed in what is effectively the cyberspace wild west, a borderless environment where traditional policing methods are often no longer effective.", and stated the resource would let police better track criminals using the internet and electronic devices.

For New Year 2008, the busiest night of the year for police, he joined front-line officers on the beat in Christchurch, where there were 32 arrests.

Broad paid tribute to Sergeants Derek Wootton and Don Wilkinson, officers killed separately in the line of duty in 2008. He announced he would be reviewing the Arms Act, as the air rifle suspected of causing Wilkinson's death could be purchased over the counter without a licence.

=== Commission of Inquiry ===
A Commission of Inquiry into Police Conduct launched by Prime Minister Helen Clark and headed by Dame Margaret Bazley ran from 4 February 2004 to 26 March 2007, with the objective to investigate the way in which New Zealand Police had dealt with allegations of sexual assault by members of the police and associates. It investigated 313 complaints of sexual assault made between 1979 and 2005, 141 of which were serious enough to lay criminal charges. Broad unequivocally and unreservedly apologised for the damning findings of the report, saying, "I acknowledge the hurt and harm that has been done to you, your families and supporters. I am truly sorry that these few of our number have caused so much pain and grief that undermined that sense of high expectations New Zealanders rightly have of their police". He publicly committed to implementing 48 recommendations relating to the police, and assisting with the 12 relating to the Police Complaints Authority.

=== Anti-terror raids ===
A major police operation during his term was the 2007 New Zealand anti-terror raids. When police conducted the dawn raids he announced they were necessary in the interest of public safety, that those arrested on 15 October had used firearms and other weapons at the military-style training camps. He told reporters, "I believe this is domestically oriented. I don't have evidence there is an international connection to this." Three hundred police were involved, resulting in the seizure of four guns and seventeen arrests. On 8 November, Solicitor General David Collins declined to prosecute under the Terrorism Suppression Act, citing insufficient evidence. In the aftermath Ruatoki residents wanted utu (revenge) in the form of Broad's resignation, a call echoed by the Māori Party and Global Peace and Justice Auckland. Broad spoke at a Wainuiomata Marae hui in March 2008, saying, "That there is hurt, I understand that, I understand how that happened and I deeply regret that." A Māori Party spokesperson said the speech was "a good start".

=== Tasers ===
The New Zealand police ran two trials examining the introduction of tasers, before Broad authorised their general use on 28 August 2008. The previous day he had taken the decision to parliament seeking input — opposition politicians and the Police Association criticised him and the Labour government for diverting attention away from other political issues and needing government help to make a decision. He declined a request by a TVNZ journalist to be tasered himself.

=== Media incidents ===
The June 2007 issue of Investigate magazine revealed that in a pornographic film involving bestiality with a chicken screened at Broad's home in 1981. He acknowledged the film was shown but stated he only learnt about it afterwards and did not approve.

A 2008 investigation by the Independent Police Conduct Authority cleared Broad of allegations he had "pulled rank" to avoid being breath tested in 1992. A detective inspector in Christchurch at the time, he returned a positive breath alcohol test. The traffic officer told him to leave the car and walk, standard practice at the time, according to the inquiry. He reported the incident to his superior the following morning.

=== Later life ===
Broad continues to work with the New Zealand Police in his capacity as a Member of the Board at Crimestoppers New Zealand.

== Ranks and posts ==
- 1975: Police cadet, Constable
- 1979–1985: Detective Constable, CIB
- 1986–1990: Detective Sergeant, Detective Inspector
- 1991: Shift Inspector
- 1992–1993: Detective Inspector, Region Support Group, Christchurch
- 1993–1994: Manager, Planning & Policy, Police National HQ
- 1995–1999: Superintendent, Strategy Group, Police National HQ
- 1999–2003: District Commander, Auckland City Police District
- 2003–2004: Assistant Commissioner (seconded), Police Standards Unit, Home Office. UK
- 2004–2006: Assistant Commissioner, Planning, Development & Deployment, Office of the Commissioner of Police
- 2006–2011: Commissioner of Police

Police appointments
Preceded by Steve Long (acting)	Commissioner of Police; 2006–2011	Succeeded by Peter Marshall
