= Peter Marshall (police officer) =

Retired New Zealand police commissioner

Peter Marshall CNZM
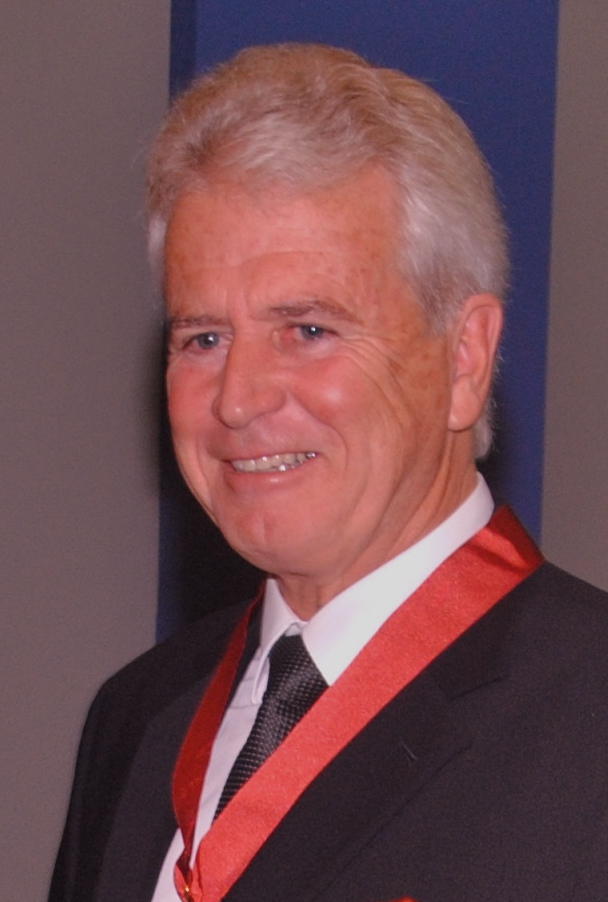
- Marshall in 2014

31st Commissioner of Police (New Zealand)
- In office 4 April 2011 – 2 April 2014
- Preceded by: Howard Broad
- Succeeded by: Mike Bush

Peter Brendon Marshall CNZM (born c.1953) is a New Zealand public servant who served as the 31st Commissioner of Police from 4 April 2011 to 2 April 2014. He was previously Commissioner of the Royal Solomon Islands Police Force.

Marshall is a career police officer who joined the New Zealand Police in 1972, and has worked both in uniform and as a detective with the Criminal Investigation Branch. Within New Zealand, he has served as head of the Hawkes Bay Armed Offenders Squad, and Area Commander in Hastings and Auckland City. Internationally he has been posted to the New Zealand diplomatic missions in Canberra from 1998 to 2002, and Washington, D.C. from 2002 to 2004, where he established a New Zealand Police liaison office for counter-terrorism. He was then Assistant Commissioner at the Police National Headquarters in Wellington, before being seconded to the Solomon Islands in February 2007. In May 2008 he became acting Commissioner of Police in the Solomons, and was officially appointed to the position in March 2009. While in the Solomons he was subjected to a home invasion by a group of thirteen people armed with machetes, but was able to defend himself and his wife with a steel ceremonial sword.

In April 2011, Marshall became the Commissioner of the New Zealand Police, and announced he would put a taser in every frontline vehicle, but would not be changing the policy that officers do not ordinarily carry firearms.

Marshall has diplomas in Business Studies and New Zealand Policing, and is a graduate of the FBI Academy. He was appointed a Member of the New Zealand Order of Merit in the 2000 Queen's Birthday Honours, and promoted to Companion of the New Zealand Order of Merit in the 2014 Queen's Birthday Honours for service to the New Zealand Police and the community.

Police appointments
Preceded by Mohammed Jahir Khan	Commissioner of the Royal Solomon Islands Police Force; May 2008 – March 2009 (acting); March 2009 – 7 February 2011	Succeeded by Walter Kola (acting)
Preceded by Howard Broad	Commissioner of the New Zealand Police; 4 April 2011 – 2 April 2014	Succeeded by Mike Bush
