= Social Investment Agency =

Government agency in New Zealand

- Māori: Toi Hau Tāngata
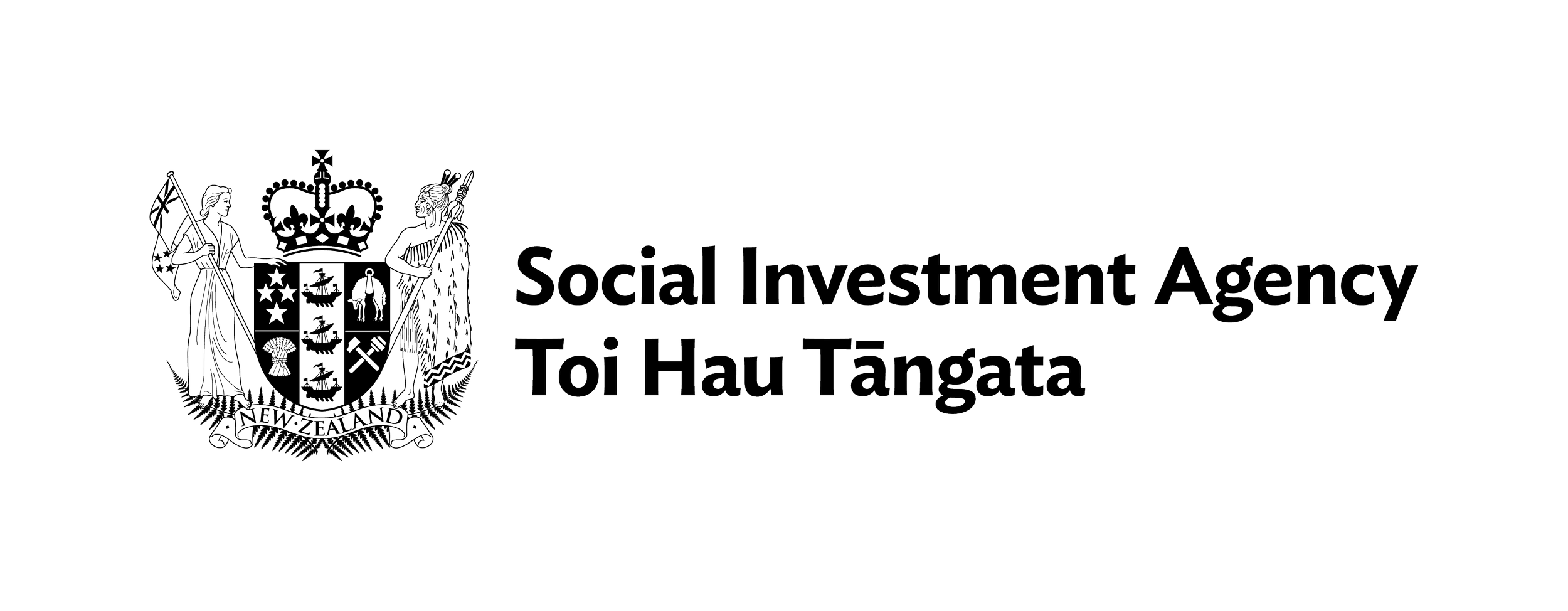

Agency overview
- Formed: 1 July 2017
- Jurisdiction: New Zealand
- Employees: 88
- Annual budget: $NZ6 million
- Minister responsible: Nicola Willis Minister for Social Investment
- Agency executive: Brendan Boyle, Acting Secretary for Social Investment and Chief Executive
- Website: sia.govt.nz

The Social Investment Agency (SIA; Māori: Toi Hau Tāngata) is a New Zealand government department that leads the implementation of the government's investment approach to social spending.

The concept of "social investment" describes the use of data to target spending on social services towards certain disadvantaged groups with the aim of achieving the best "return" in terms of long-term social outcomes and government costs resulting from social issues.

Originally run out of a unit within the Ministry of Social Development, the Social Investment Agency was first established as a departmental agency hosted by the State Services Commission on 1 July 2017. It was later known as the Social Wellbeing Agency (2020–2024) and reverted to its original name when it was re-established as a standalone central agency.

== Mandate and leadership ==
The Social Investment Agency is responsible for overseeing, coordinating and implementing the government's social investment approach. Its functions include:

- Setting social investment standards for government agencies and contractors.
- Advising on the data and evidence infrastructure for social investment.
- Working with other agencies to apply the social investment approach.
- Reviewing social sector spending and measuring outcomes.
- Delivering advice and tools to support the social sector.

The responsible minister is the Minister for Social Investment, Nicola Willis. The agency's chief executive position is vacant after Andrew Coster resigned in December 2025. The agency is headed by a board known as the Social Investment Board, which oversees its program. The board members include former Secretary to the Treasury Graham Scott, former New Zealand Labour Party president and former Howard League chief executive Mike Williams, and former Minister for Māori Development Te Ururoa Flavell.

The agency defines its social investment approach as using data and evidence to understand people's needs; establishing clear, measurable goals and focusing on effective strategies; measuring and comparing service effectiveness using a informed decision-making approach; and empowering local providers to deliver services to their communities. The agency's work will also be supported by a Social Investment Fund, expected to come into operation by 2025.

=== List of ministers for social investment ===
The following ministers have held the office of Minister for Social Investment.

Key

National

No.	Name	Portrait	Term of Office		Prime Minister
1	Amy Adams		20 December 2016	26 October 2017	English
2017–2023: No separate appointments, see Minister for Social Development
2	Nicola Willis		27 November 2023	present	Luxon

== History ==
=== Launch ===
In December 2016, prime minister Bill English, who had championed the social investment approach in his previous role as Minister of Finance, announced Amy Adams as the first Minister for Social Investment. On 24 April 2017, Adams announced that a new Social Investment Agency would be established from 1 July 2017 to replace the Ministry of Social Development's Social Investment Unit. The agency was tasked with advising the New Zealand Government on social investment and building the "social investment infrastructure" for government agencies and non-governmental organisations (NGOs) to help frontline workers provide targeted services.

=== 2020 revamp ===
When the Sixth Labour Government came to power following the 2017 New Zealand general election, it placed the agency and its approach under review. As a result of this, it was reformed into the Social Wellbeing Agency from 19 March 2020 with the aim of being "more people-focused" by "looking at people and their needs" in addition to the existing data-based approach. The Minister for Social Development was given responsibility for social investment policy during this period.

=== 2024 revamp ===
In May 2024, Minister of Finance Nicola Willis announced that the Social Wellbeing Agency would be revamped as the Social Investment Agency by 1 July 2024. The revamped agency would be a standalone central government agency with a revised mandate and new leadership board. Willis also announced the establishment of a new Social Investment Fund by 2025 to work with non-governmental organisations and iwi (tribal) providers to deliver services to vulnerable New Zealanders. While in opposition, the National Party had campaigned on establishing a Social Investment Fund to help disadvantaged citizens. The Fund was established in the 2025 New Zealand budget, with $190 million allocated for initiatives to support families with autistic children, reduce youth offending and truancy, and partner with iwi to support Māori communities.

In early August 2024, Willis confirmed that the agency would become one of the New Zealand Government's central agencies alongside the New Zealand Treasury, Department of the Prime Minister and Cabinet, the Public Service Commission, and the new Ministry for Regulation. This would give the Social Investment Agency oversight over other government departments. In addition, Willis announced that the Government would appoint a new permanent chief executive and advisory board for the agency. On 24 September, Police Commissioner Andrew Coster was announced as the new chief executive, effective 11 November 2024. In mid November 2025, Coster was placed on leave as CEO of the Social Investment Agency following a critical Independent Police Conduct Authority (IPCA) report that he and other senior Police executives had covered up sexual misconduct allegations involving former Deputy Commissioner Jevon McSkimming.

On 24 November 2025, Social Investment Minister Nicola Willis announced that the SIA would grant $50 million worth of grants to several community organisations including Te Hou Ora Whānau Services Limited, Tākiri Mai te Ata Trust, Te Puawaitanga ki Ōtautahi Charitable Trust, Ngāti Awa Social and Health Services Trust, Barnardos New Zealand Incorporated, Horowhenua New Zealand Trust and Kaikaranga Holding Ltd to provide various services to disadvantaged children and young people.

On 3 December 2025, Coster resigned from his position effective immediately. In April 2026, Brendan Boyle was announced as Acting Secretary and chief executive.
