= Tania Kura =

Retired senior New Zealand police officer

- Education: Royal New Zealand Police College
- Occupation: Police officer
- Organisation: New Zealand Police

Tania Kura is a former New Zealand Police officer who served as both Deputy Police Commissioner and interim Police Commissioner. After serving 38 years in the New Zealand Police, she retired in July 2025. In November 2025, Kura was named in a critical Independent Police Conduct Authority (IPCA) report which found that several senior Police executives had mishandled accusations of sexual misconduct against former Deputy Commissioner Jevon McSkimming.

== Early life and family ==
Tania Kura is Māori of Ngāti Maniapoto, Ngāti Te Kanawa and Ngāti Te Kanawa descent. She is married, has three children and at least one grandchild.

== Police career ==
Kura joined the New Zealand Police in 1987. She graduated from the Royal New Zealand Police College in 1988 and started as a constable in Christchurch.

During her police career, she worked at the Royal New Zealand Police College and also served in various uniformed, investigative and leadership positions in the Canterbury, Southern, Central, Bay of Plenty and Eastern police districts. In 2012, Kura was promoted to Area Commander in Hawke's Bay and later rose to become District Commissioner Eastern based in Hastings in 2017. In addition, she also oversaw the Mount Maunganui police station.

In 2020, Kura moved to the National Police Headquarters in Wellington where she assumed the position of Deputy Commissioner Leadership and Capability, becoming the first policewoman in New Zealand to achieve that rank. In late October 2025, she was appointed as interim Commissioner of Police following the resignation of Police Commissioner Andrew Coster, pending the appointment of a full-time replacement. As interim Police Commissioner, she oversaw operations in all 12 police districts including frontline operations, investigations and community policing.

On 24 July 2025, Deputy Commissioner Kura retired from the New Zealand Police, with Police Minister Mark Mitchell and Police Commissioner Richard Chambers acknowledging her service and record. On 12 November 2025, she was named in a critical Independent Police Conduct Authority report into sexual misconduct allegations against former Deputy Commissioner Jevon McSkimming. The IPCA found that Kura had failed to make "sufficiently robust enquiries" into allegations made by McSkimming's estranged former lover that were published on a LinkedIn post in 2023, accepting McSkimming's account that he had been caught up in an "affair gone wrong." The IPCA report criticised Kura and other senior Police executives for being more concerned about protecting McSkimming's candidacy to become Police Commissioner than investigating the complainant's complaints against McSkimming. On 19 November, RNZ also reported that Kura and a senior police officer had visited McSkimming in July 2025 while he was still facing charges of possessing objectionable material. Upon learning of her visit, Police Commissioner Chambers criticised Kura, describing her decision as "inappropriate for an executive member and a statutory deputy commissioner." Following the visit, Kura subsequently tendered her resignation from the Police.
