= Nicholas Pirihi =

New Zealand cricketer and police officer

Personal information
- Full name: Nicholas Gordon Pirihi
- Born: 19 April 1977 (age 49); Whangārei, Northland, New Zealand
- Batting: Right-handed

Domestic team information
- Years: Team
- 1997–1999: Oxford University

Career statistics
| Competition | First-class |
|---|---|
| Matches | 8 |
| Runs scored | 115 |
| Batting average | 9.58 |
| 100s/50s | –/– |
| Top score | 25 |
| Balls bowled | 6 |
| Wickets | 1 |
| Bowling average | 0.00 |
| 5 wickets in innings | – |
| 10 wickets in match | – |
| Best bowling | 1/0 |
| Catches/stumpings | 3/– |
- Source: Cricinfo, 28 June 2020

Nicholas Gordon Pirihi (born 19 April 1977) is a New Zealand police officer and former first-class cricketer.

Pirihi was born at Whangārei in April 1977. He later studied mathematics and science to masters level at the University of Waikato, before gaining a Rhodes Scholarship to read law at Merton College, Oxford. Prior to leaving for England, he was known as a field hockey player and had played for the New Zealand Māori field hockey team. While studying at Oxford, Pirihi played first-class cricket for Oxford University from 1997–99, making eight appearances. He scored 115 runs in his eight matches at an average of 9.58, with a high score of 23.

After returning to New Zealand, Pihiri worked in the financial markets. Deciding to realise a lifelong dream of becoming a police officer, he joined the New Zealand Police in 2006. He is currently a detective in the Criminal Investigation Branch. Pirihi plays field hockey for the Northland Police, in addition to assisting the Waikato Hockey Association as an administrator.
