= Jevon McSkimming =

New Zealand police officer and public servant

Jevon Murray McSkimming
- Born: 1972 or 1973 (age 52–53)
- Occupation: Deputy Commissioner of Police
- Employer: New Zealand Police
- Known for: Collecting child sexual abuse and bestiality material while working at Police headquarters
- Term: 2020–2025
- Successor: Mike Pannett
- Conviction: Possession of objectionable material
- Penalty: Home detention (9 months)

Jevon Murray McSkimming (born 1972 or 1973) is a New Zealand former senior police officer. He served as Deputy Commissioner of Police from 2020 until his resignation in 2025, when he was convicted of possessing child sexual exploitation and bestiality material, including on his work devices. The scandal caused widespread uproar in New Zealand, given McSkimming was actively being considered for the role of Commissioner, and the Police had intervened in sexual misconduct allegations against him to protect his career, including charging his accuser with harassment.

McSkimming joined the New Zealand Police in 1996. In 2016, at age 40, he began an affair which lasted two years with a 21-year-old woman (later referred to by the Independent Police Conduct Authority as Ms Z) and helped her find employment with Police. When the relationship came to an end, she made multiple allegations to police of sexual misconduct. McSkimming told his colleagues that Ms Z wanted to get back together with him, and accordingly, senior management initially refused to investigate her allegations. In May 2024, the Police charged her with harassment under the Harmful Digital Communications Act 2015. After five years, a senior officer finally did investigate Ms Z's claims and in November 2024, McSkimming was placed on special leave.

In the process of investigating the allegations of sexual abuse, investigators found McSkimming had been using work devices to access pornography. On 12 May 2025, he resigned as deputy police commissioner following two separate investigations by the Independent Police Conduct Authority (IPCA) into these allegations. On 6 November 2025, McSkimming pleaded guilty to three charges of possessing child sexual exploitation and bestiality material. After these charges were laid, McSkimming refused to testify against Ms Z and the charges against her for harassing him were dropped. However, charges for allegedly harassing the detective who arrested her are still outstanding.

The IPCA report released on 12 November 2025, found that several senior Police executives including former Police Commissioner Andrew Coster had ignored the allegations of serious offending by McSkimming, preferring to believe the woman was harassing him and wanting to get back together with him.

== Early life and education ==
McSkimming was born in 1972 or 1973 and grew up in Dunedin, where he attended John McGlashan College. He studied at the Dunedin Teachers' College during the 1990s. After graduating, McSkimming opted not to pursue a career in teaching and enrolled at the Royal New Zealand Police College in Trentham.

== Police career ==
He joined the New Zealand Police in 1996. As a police officer, McSkimming was first posted to Auckland. By 2000, he had married and moved to Gore in Southland. While stationed in Gore, McSkimming was awarded a police bronze medal for subduing a man armed with kitchen knives who had locked himself in a house. In January 2005, McSkimming moved to Murchison in the Tasman District.

In 2007 he moved to Wellington, where he worked through roles including Acting Area Commander, Acting National Operations Manager, National Manager Mobility, Assistant Commissioner (Service)—a rank he achieved at the age of 40—and, from 2020, Deputy Commissioner (Strategy and Service). He also ran promotion courses for sergeants and senior sergeants at the Police College. By 2010, McSkimming had become the acting area commander for Wellington and Porirua. By 2015, he had become an Assistant Commissioner and the Police's chief information officer, overseeing Police technological services including the rollout of iPads and iPhones to Police staff. In 2019, McSkimming oversaw the rollout of the Police's 105 non-emergency phone line and also managed the Police property portfolio and vehicle fleet.

In 2020, McSkimming was promoted by Police Commissioner Andrew Coster to the position of deputy commissioner. On the recommendation of Prime Minister Chris Hipkins, McSkimming was promoted to statutory deputy commissioner in 2023. This role came with better remuneration and higher status than (non-statutory) deputy commissioner. In advice to the Prime Minister from the Public Service Commission, McSkimming's career path was described as "relative unique", as he had worked in operations and strategy since 2010. In 2024 he and Richard Chambers were interviewed for commissioner, the top job in New Zealand's police force. McSkimming's experience managing such things as IT systems and property portfolios contrasted with Chambers' experience closer to the frontlines. Minister Mark Mitchell appointed Chambers.

As deputy commissioner in 2024, McSkimming received an email from an acquaintance whose firearms license would be at risk if he was given any more driving demerit points. The next day he made changes to the policy and process used by police while vetting firearms licenses, ending the use of Police Infringement Bureau data including traffic offences. As McSkimming's police career was ending the next year, these changes were reversed. Commissioner Chambers said that "better judgement could have been exercised and a more robust process followed".

McSkimming's successor as deputy commissioner, Mike Pannett, was appointed in December 2025.

== Alleged sexual misconduct ==
In 2016, at the age of 40, McSkimming was promoted to assistant commissioner of Police and became involved in an extramarital relationship with a 21-year-old woman, subsequently referred to as Ms Z, whom he met at a sporting club where he was a coach. McSkimming helped the young woman secure a casual job at the Wellington Central Police Station and they had an affair lasting two years. While he has maintained that the relationship was consensual, the woman subsequently disputed this account. Soon after the relationship ended, Ms Z began posting messages on Facebook and LinkedIn about McSkimming, and to the church he attended. Between December 2023 and April 2024, she sent more than 300 emails to his work email address, alleging serious sexual misconduct, threats to use an intimate recording and the misuse of police credit card and police property. Anonymous online reports were made to the 105 call number—a service that McSkimming himself had established.

Once he started receiving these emails, McSkimming disclosed the affair to his supervisor. Two senior officers asked him if his affair had been with a police staff member which he denied. Over the next five years, this "affair that ended badly" was raised within police management a number of times. McSkimming consistently claimed Ms Z wanted to get back together with him. However, the IPCA report released in 2025 found there was no suggestion of that from Ms Z whatsoever. The Independent Police Conduct Authority (IPCA) also determined that the police never investigated Ms Z's complaints, and that between 2018 and late 2024, never read the emails Ms Z sent to McSkimming. Commissioner Coster became aware of the affair in 2020 and believed that McSkimming had become the victim of Ms Z’s 'fixation'. Coster was about to retire and was supportive of McSkimming's application to take over the role as Police Commissioner.

In May 2024, Ms Z was charged with harassment by police under the Harmful Digital Communications Act 2015. Shortly thereafter, the matter was referred to the IPCA. In October 2024, McSkimming was suspended with full pay pending a criminal investigation led by the IPCA regarding the allegations of sexual misconduct. It was only in October 2024 after the chair of the IPCA expressed concerns about the initial investigation that police launched Operation Jefferson – a criminal investigation into Ms Z's complaints of multiple sexual offence allegations, including sexual violation by rape, sexual violation by unlawful sexual connection, and indecent assault. In the end, not enough evidence was found to prosecute. The IPCA report also revealed a number of other allegations, including misuse of a police credit card, inappropriate use of police property for sexual gain and threatening to release an intimate video of Ms Z if she made any complaints.

The IPCA report was released on 11 November 2025. The IPCA noted: "no one conducted any enquiries, including trying to contact Ms Z, to establish the veracity of the allegations prior to her being charged." The IPCA added that Officer D, subsequently identified as Detective Inspector Nicola Reeves, said the handling of the investigation prior to her involvement had been "appalling." It stated that there was serious misconduct by police leadership, including from former Commissioner of Police Andrew Coster who failed to disclose to the Public Service Commission that he knew about McSkimming’s relationship with Ms Z and his alleged misconduct. The IPCA stated that a number of senior police officers, including Coster and former Deputy Commissioner Tania Kura, had interfered with the investigation to avoid jeopardizing McSkimming's appointment as the next Commissioner of Police and instead attempted to prosecute the complainant. Richard Chambers was appointed as Police Commissioner on 25 November 2024.

In late February 2026, Radio New Zealand reported that McSkimming had alleged that Coster had advised him to pursue harassment charges against the woman accusing him of sexual assault. The public broadcaster had obtained a letter dated to December 2024 under the Official Information Act in which Mcskimming's lawyer Michael Heron KC had told Prime Minister Christopher Luxon, Police Minister Mark Mitchell and Deputy Public Service Commissioner Heather Baggott alleging that McSkimming was the "victim of a sustained campaign of stalking and harassment" spanning several years. In early March 2026, the IPCA released a summary of its investigation into McSkimming's decision to invite Ms Z to stay with him in hotel accommodation through the use of police funds on several occasions in 2016. Following a delay, McSkimming repaid $500 for using police funds to stay at hotels during his affair with Ms Z.

== Possession of objectionable material ==
In the process of investigating Ms Z's complaints against McSkimming, police examined his work computer and found pornographic images depicting child exploitation and bestiality. McSkimming resigned in May 2025, and applied for a court order preventing reporting on the nature of the alleged objectionable material. His application was dismissed. In a statement after McSkimming's resignation, Police Minister Mark Mitchell said, "I instructed the Public Service Commission to commence the process to remove Mr McSkimming from office after allegations of a very serious nature recently came to light, separate to the investigation that led to him being suspended".

On 27 June 2025, McSkimming was arrested and charged with eight counts of possession of objectionable material, including child sexual abuse material and bestiality.

On 17 December, McSkimming was sentenced to nine months' home detention, having earlier pled guilty to three charges of possessing objectionable publications. Five other charges were withdrawn. The first of these was related to 812 images involving adult bestiality material, the second charge was related to 68 images involving child sexual exploitation material and the third charge was related to 2065 images with a 37% child sexual exploitation and 63% bestiality split average.

McSkimming had used Google searches over 5000 times since the earliest retrievable record in July 2020, where he would often look for artificially-generated material which referenced underage girls, incest, animals with keywords such as "slave" and "abuse". McSkimming would access the objectionable material during work hours, primarily using his phone, but also his work laptop. From July 2024, 7% of all searches on McSkimming's devices were intended or highly likely to return objectionable material.

While he was prosecuted only for activity starting in 2020, for which evidence was available, his pre-sentencing report included an admission that this behaviour dated back to 2015.

=== Response from New Zealand Police ===
After McSkimming's resignation, concerns on how he was able to access the alleged child exploitation and bestiality material prompted Police Commissioner Richard Chambers to order an independent "rapid review" into police information security (INFOSEC). Chambers wanted to ensure police had appropriate controls to prevent and detect misuse of police devices to stop staff from being able to "exploit vulnerabilities to access inappropriate content". The report found that police's current systems were "inconsistent", "inadequate," and "insufficient". In response, Chambers announced police would bring back six-monthly audits of data and internet usage on devices.

On 19 November police announced that 20 staff members were consequently placed under investigation. Within a week, three were cleared as work-related searches. Six individuals had been stood down, including a senior detective who was reported to be facing a criminal investigation. By 23 February 2026, Deputy Commissioner Jill Rogers confirmed that Police had investigated a total of 18 cases, with five staff being stood down and three other staffers leaving the Police.

On 9 November, Chambers confirmed that he had initiated proceedings to strip McSkimming of his medals and clasps, which was supported by Police Minister Mitchell. In an earlier statement the commissioner had said, "The prosecution of Mr Jevon McSkimming shows no member of the Police is above the law, no matter how senior". By early May 2026, McSkimming's "long service and good conduct" medals and clasps had been returned to the Police and destroyed.

Under the Police Super Scheme, McSkimming still remains eligible for a pension as a senior police officer.

=== Name suppression and injunctions ===
Even prior to his June 27 arrest, McSkimming had been subject to a broad name suppression order that prevented any reporting on his identity or the nature of the charges against him. Name suppression lapsed on 4 August 2025. Before 18 July 2025, there was a court-ordered injunction to stop media from publishing details about the alleged material and until 19 May 2025 there was a non-publication order on the fact there was an injunction.

== Personal life ==
McSkimming married his wife around 2000. He also attended Connect Church in Paraparaumu, Kāpiti Coast District until 2024. Connect Church is part of New Life Churches, a Pentecostal Christian denomination. Following media coverage in 2024 that he was facing charges of possessing objectionable material, Connect Church condemned his behaviour and barred him from in-person attendances.

During his career, he acquired a $2 million home in Te Horo, two other properties in Waikanae, and owned sports cars, including an Audi R8. He used to race motorbikes until he had a crash, after which he abandoned this passion.

== See also ==
- List of New Zealand Police controversies
