= Corruption in New Zealand =

New Zealand is regarded as having one of the lowest levels of corruption in the world, but Transparency International and the Serious Fraud Office have expressed concerns recently about the growth of organised crime in New Zealand, poor accountability in public sector procurement, weaknesses in border controls and an increase in fraud and cybercrime.

Corruption involves activities such as bribery, embezzlement, nepotism, fraud, and conflicts of interest, among others. The Crime and Victims Survey in 2024 revealed that fraud is the fastest-growing crime in New Zealand, making up nearly 30% of all crimes. Online scams are particularly prevalent, with research suggesting that two-thirds of New Zealanders have been targeted and one-third have fallen victim to scams. Digital fraud schemes, including business email compromises and crypto investment scams, are becoming more sophisticated, often utilising social engineering tactics and artificial intelligence.

A 2025 Ministerial Advisory Group defined corruption as the abuse of power, particularly in the context of organised crime. The group highlighted that despite New Zealand's reputation for being relatively free from corruption, organised crime, particularly drug importation, represents a growing "insider threat" involving trusted individuals within institutions, especially at the borders. Airport baggage handlers, customs employees, and police officers have been implicated in facilitating illicit activities. Organised crime rings often use employees to retrieve drug shipments before they are inspected, a trend consistent with global findings on maritime drug seizures.

Business-related fraud is also increasing, with external parties such as vendors or third-party suppliers, responsible for 84% of fraud incidents. Fraud in New Zealand spans various sectors, including local councils, government agencies, and educational institutions. Cyber-enabled fraud, procurement fraud, and large-scale scams have been on the increase, particularly targeting businesses in high-value industries like law firms and real estate. The National Cyber Security Centre reported that scams had caused financial losses exceeding NZ$25 million in 2024, a 40% increase from 2023. However, estimates suggest that the total cost of fraud may be as high as NZ$2 billion annually, including unreported cases.

Tax evasion and avoidance are also significant issues. Tax avoidance, primarily through multinational corporations shifting profits offshore, results in revenue losses, such as $167 million in 2023. Conversely, tax evasion, which is illegal, is estimated to cost New Zealand around NZ$1.2 billion annually, though only a small percentage of offenders are prosecuted. The national tax debt in 2024 stood at NZ$8.5 billion, with efforts to recover over $4 billion in unpaid taxes by mid-2025.

Benefit fraud is much smaller in scale, with most cases involving overpayment recovery rather than criminal charges. In the 2021/22 period, benefit fraud led to overpayments of around NZ$2.4 million, although the total scale of welfare fraud in New Zealand is believed to be between NZ$10-20 million annually.

The prevalence of political corruption is unclear, but concerns are growing about the impact of political lobbying and conflicts of interest. The lobbying industry is unregulated in New Zealand, allowing former politicians to transition into lobbying roles, potentially influencing policy decisions. Examples include lobbying efforts by industries like finance, alcohol and tobacco, which have contributed to weak regulations and public crises, such as the finance company collapses and the leaky homes crisis.

A related concern is the lack of transparency surrounding political donations, which can grant undue influence to wealthy individuals and corporations. Scandals involving the National Party in 2018 and the New Zealand First Foundation in 2019 revealed loopholes in donation laws and raised questions about the integrity of the political process.

While corruption in New Zealand’s police force remains relatively low, individual officers have been involved in several controversies, including the manipulation of evidence and the use of prison snitches which have led to historical wrongful convictions. The Police National Integrity Unit is responsible for monitoring and investigating police misconduct.

== International ranking ==
New Zealand is regarded as having one of the lowest levels of corruption in the world. Transparency International's 2025 Corruption Perceptions Index scored 182 countries according to the perceived corruption of their public sector on a scale from 0 ("highly corrupt") to 100 ("very clean"). Those countries were then ranked by their score; the country ranked first was perceived to have the most honest public sector. In the 2025 Index, New Zealand earned the fourth-highest score worldwide at 81. In the Asia Pacific region (Note: Afghanistan, Australia, Bangladesh, Bhutan, Brunei Darussalam, Cambodia, China, Fiji, Hong Kong, India, Indonesia, Japan, North Korea, South Korea, Laos, Malaysia, Maldives, Mongolia, Myanmar, Nepal, New Zealand, Pakistan, Papua New Guinea, Philippines, Singapore, Solomon Islands, Sri Lanka, Taiwan, Thailand, Timor-Leste, Vanuatu, Vietnam) New Zealand's was the second-best score, after Singapore.

== Definitions of corruption ==
Although corruption is generally described as the abuse of entrusted power for private gain, it can take different forms including bribery, embezzlement, nepotism, extortion, kickbacks, money laundering, fraud, and conflicts of interest.

In 2025, a Ministerial Advisory Group defined corruption as the "abuse of access or authority to advance the objectives of organised crime" and said that despite New Zealand's longstanding reputation for being free of corruption, organised crime represented an "insider threat," whereby individuals in trusted positions are being targeted, particularly at the borders, to facilitate illicit drug importation.

The Auditor General of New Zealand states that corruption is a type of fraud, and the Ministry of Justice says fraud is currently the most prevalent and fastest growing crime type in New Zealand. Money laundering is now estimated at $1.35 billion NZD per year, reflecting illegal activity connected to drug markets, tax evasion, and other financial crimes.

== Organised crime ==
In May 2025, the Ministerial Advisory Group on Transnational, Serious and Organised Crime presented a report to Cabinet on the growing threat to New Zealand and the Pacific posed by organised crime. It identified instances of corruption involving airport baggage handlers, Customs employees assisting in the importation of illicit drugs, the exploitation of migrants, and a police officer who was paid $70,000 by an organised crime group to share sensitive information from the police database.

The Report said New Zealand is more susceptible than ever to corruption at our borders and that this is an increasing threat. A majority of interceptions of drugs at our ports and airports involve trusted insiders helping to retrieve concealed shipments before customs inspects them - consistent with an unpublished global report which estimates that 70% of maritime seizures worldwide involve insider cooperation.

== Business related fraud ==
However, in business related fraud, a report by KPMG in 2012, found that only 17% of perpetrators are employees or 'insiders' within the victim organisation, including both management and non-management staff. Fraud has been committed in local councils, transport authorities, educational institutions, government ministries, and by business consultants. Notable public sector examples include council employees manipulating procurement processes, senior managers in government agencies, and individuals in leadership roles at public entities.

KPMG said that around 84% of perpetrators in business related fraud are external parties or 'outsiders,' such as vendors, customers, or third-party suppliers. These external actors often engage in procurement fraud, cyber-enabled fraud, and large-scale scams.

The National Cyber Security Centre reported that in the first three months of 2025, more than half of the financial losses from scams were suffered by businesses, especially those handling large financial transactions such as law firms and real estate agencies. In 2024, scam losses came to NZ$25.7 million, up 40% from NZ$18.3 million in 2023. However, independent estimates suggest that the true annual cost of fraud — including unreported incidents — could range from NZ$200 million to NZ$2 billion.

=== Tax evasion and tax avoidance ===
Tax avoidance: New Zealand loses significant sums of revenue through legal tax avoidance mechanisms, especially through multinational corporations shifting profits offshore. For example, in 2023, about USD$167.6 million in tax revenue was lost this way. The Tax Justice Network wants an end to global tax abuse that deprives countries of tax revenue.

Tax evasion: Tax evasion is a subset of avoidance that is illegal. Figures from Inland Revenue show that, in the first half of the 2024/25 financial year, audits uncovered $600 million in additional tax that should have been declared - suggesting the annual total of taxes evaded by new Zealanders would be in the vicinity of $1.2 billion. Only 60–80 tax evasion cases are prosecuted each year, targeting just 0.01% of taxpayers. This reflects the often complex and less visible nature of such offending.

At the end of 2024, New Zealand’s tax debt (including overdue, unpaid, and evaded taxes across all sectors) stood at $8.5 billion. A significant increase in prosecutions means Inland Revenue is on track to collect over $4 billion in overdue and evaded taxes for the financial year ending June 2025.

Benefit fraud: In comparison, most benefit fraud in New Zealand is relatively small, and the majority of benefit fraud cases involve overpayment recovery rather than criminal prosecution. In the 2021/22 year 4,638 cases of benefit fraud were investigated, but only 33 resulted in criminal prosecutions, with $2.4 million identified as total overpayments.

However, the overall scale of welfare fraud in New Zealand is in the range of $10–$20 million per year - although overpayments may not necessarily be the fault of the recipient. In the year ending June 2024, the Ministry of Social Development recorded 1,092 completed benefit fraud investigations, resulting in a total of $12.24 million in overpayments for that financial year.

== Personal victimisation ==
According to data from the 2024 Crime and Victims Survey, fraud is now the most prevalent and fastest growing type of crime in New Zealand, accounting for around 29% of all crimes committed.

Recent research suggests that two-thirds (67%) of New Zealanders have been targeted by online scams and one in three (33%) have actually fallen victim.

=== Factors contributing to increase in fraud ===
Increased reliance on digital banking, online shopping, and digital communication platforms has created more opportunities for scammers and fraudsters to target both individuals and businesses from anywhere in the world. The growth in digital asset investments has made people vulnerable to crypto investment scams, which are harder to trace and regulate.

Business email compromise and unauthorised money transfers are among the fastest-growing types of scams, with high-value incidents involving amounts exceeding $100,000 being reported more frequently.

Scams and fraud schemes increasingly use social engineering, psychological manipulation, and even AI-driven tactics to build trust and steal information or money. Many victims feel shame that they fell prey to a scam and only about a third of victims report the incident. At the same time, regulatory and enforcement agencies are struggling to keep pace with rapidly evolving fraud strategies, leading to a lag in effective prevention and response.

== Potential political corruption ==
=== Undue influence of lobbyists ===
A range of concerns have been raised over the access of lobbyists to Members of Parliament (MPs) in New Zealand. Unlike countries such as Australia or Canada, the lobbying industry is largely unregulated, and there is no dedicated watchdog or monitoring of lobbying activities. Lobbyists do not have to register, disclose their clients, or reveal their activities. This has allowed New Zealand to develop a “revolving door”, whereby former politicians and ministerial staff move into lobbying roles after leaving government.

For example, Kris Faafoi, a former Cabinet minister, became a lobbyist almost immediately after leaving politics. In 2024, former opposition National Party leader, Simon Bridges was appointed as Chair of NZTA by the National Government raising concerns about whether such appointments undermine impartiality and integrity of the public service.

This raises concerns about the misuse of privileged information and future employment influencing current official decisions, and makes it difficult for the public to know who is influencing MPs on critical issues - fueling suspicion about potential backroom deals and undue influence by those with access. Both the Ministry of Justice and independent observers have warned that excessive influence, opaque lobbying, and the appearance of MPs “trading favours behind closed doors” threaten the integrity of New Zealand’s democracy.

==== Chumocracy ====
Auckland University economics professor, Robert MacCulloch, believes that New Zealand's economic prosperity is being hindered because top jobs in Government agencies are being awarded to former politicians and connected insiders by the political party currently in power. He says New Zealand has become a 'chumocracy' and that this blocks more deserving, but non-connected Kiwis from aspiring to these roles - contributing to the economic stagnation and the loss of living standards.

Politicians: To illustrate his concern, MacCulloch points out that after the 2023 election, a number of Sir John Key-era politicians were given high-ranking jobs. Simon Bridges was made chair of the Waka Kotahi; Paula Bennett made chair of Pharmac; Steven Joyce was given the infrastructure advisory chair; Sir Bill English was given the role of reviewing state housing; and Murray McCully was appointed to head an education inquiry.

Non-politicians: Non-politician VIPs appointed to important roles include former Treasury Secretary, Graham Scott, who Finance Minister Nicola Willis made chair of her Social Investment Agency; Matt Burgess, who was a Cabinet adviser under John Key, was returned to advise Prime Minister Christopher Luxon; Lester Levy appointed by John Key to chair the Auckland District Health Board, was appointed by Chris Luxon to chair Health New Zealand; Sir Peter Gluckman, who was Key’s science adviser, has been appointed to head the advisory group for the sciences and universities.

=== Examples ===
Lobbying by industry sectors has contributed to the adoption of "light-handed" or weak regulation in areas such as finance and building standards, with disastrous public consequences. For instance, the collapse of multiple finance companies since 2006 led to the loss of billions of dollars of investors' money. In 2011, this led to an overhaul of laws regulating finance companies and the creation of a new regulator - the Financial Markets Authority (FMA).

The leaky homes crisis in New Zealand, producing costs of $11 billion - estimated as half the true cost - has also been linked to lobbying efforts that prioritised industry profit over robust public protections.

Lobbying by particular industries, especially in agriculture, liquor, hospitality, and processed foods, continues to shape policy outcomes. For example, efforts to introduce stricter alcohol and unhealthy food regulations have often been stymied or watered down due to lobbying pressure from these sectors. The tobacco industry has also been effective due to their links with the NZ First Party - undermining New Zealand's commitment to be smoke free by the end of 2025.

=== Opaque political donations ===
Concerns have also been raised about political donations from wealthy individuals and corporations, which can grant privileged access and influence, particularly in the absence of robust disclosure laws. This further distorts the policy-making process in favour of those with financial resources.

=== High profile conflict of interest cases ===
Taito Phillip Field (2009): Taito Philip Field, a former Labour MP and government minister, was sentenced to six years in prison in 2019 for bribery and corruption related to accepting free labor from people he assisted with immigration matters.

Michael Wood's Airport Shares (2023): As Minister of Transport, Michael Wood failed to sell significant shares in Auckland Airport, repeatedly ignoring official advice to do so, despite making ministerial decisions affecting the airport sector. This clear conflict led to his resignation and was cited as an explicit case of a minister putting personal profit ahead of public duty.

Stuart Nash's Donor Dealings (2020–2023): While a minister in Cabinet, Stuart Nash shared confidential Cabinet information with political donors who stood to benefit from government decisions, and advocated for a donor and friend to receive government appointments. This breached multiple ethical rules and demonstrating the misuse of public office for personal or associates' gain.

Jami-Lee Ross Donation Scandal (2018–2020): Ex-MP Jami-Lee Ross was implicated in helping facilitate donations of almost $200,000 to the National Party. The donations were allegedly split into smaller amounts to avoid disclosure requirements. The incident caused significant reputational damage for the National Party. While no current senior officials were charged, the scandal highlighted vulnerabilities in donation laws and prompted widespread calls for reform.

New Zealand First Foundation Scandal (2019–2022): The NZ First Foundation collected almost $500,000 in donations from various wealthy donors, including those in food manufacturing, racing, forestry, and property development. These funds were used for party activities but were not properly disclosed, raising accusations of using a “secret slush fund” and allegedly breaching electoral rules. The Serious Fraud Office (SFO) prosecuted, although the trial ended without convictions due to technical legalities, the court affirmed that the donations should have been disclosed under the Electoral Act.

Casey Costello’s Tobacco Industry Advocacy: As Associate Health Minister, Casey Costello has recommended and implemented policies that closely align with tobacco industry interests. She ordered a 50% cut to the excise tax on heated tobacco products, and repealed aspects of the 'smokefree' legislation which would have banned sales of cigarettes to anyone born after 2008. These policies represent a cut in tobacco excise available to Government of $1.6 billion a year and were implemented despite advice from health officials against it. Costello has been widely criticised as mirroring tobacco company strategy documents.

== Police misconduct ==
The New Zealand police are perceived to have a minimal level of institutional corruption. The National Organised Crime Group within the New Zealand Police has uncovered some corruption in government agencies and the private sector connected to criminal groups, but systemic corruption within the police itself remains limited overall. However, individual police officers have been involved in numerous controversies in recent years, some of which may be perceived as involving corrupt behaviour. See the List of New Zealand Police controversies.

Historically, there have been a number of wrongful convictions involving police misconduct, such as the planting of evidence against Arthur Allan Thomas in 1979, who was later pardoned and compensated after a Royal Commission found police officers responsible for framing him. Since then, police officers have been accused of manipulating evidence, fabricating information, pressuring witnesses to lie, and using questionable investigative techniques in the pursuit of convictions - strategies which have been described as noble cause corruption.

Since 2021, hundreds of police staff have been criminally investigated, and the Police National Integrity Unit continues efforts to deter and detect corruption within the force.

== Prison issues ==
The influence of gangs in prison and informal inmate control over prison economies have raised concerns about prison management, but official reports suggest that direct corruption involving Corrections staff such as bribery and smuggling are relatively rare. Nevertheless, in 2021, it was reported that 387 Corrections staff were placed under investigation within a single year for issues including corruption, smuggling contraband, and inappropriate relationships with inmates.

In 2023, six current and former Corrections staff were charged after a three-year police investigation (Operation Portia) into corruption and bribery. Offences involved smuggling contraband such as tobacco and food into the prison in exchange for cash payments to staff members by associates of prisoners. One former Corrections officer pleaded guilty to multiple bribery charges and admitted to delivering goods to prisoners in exchange for money, with some transactions involving thousands of dollars. Several senior staff, including managers, were suspended during the investigation, and the case brought attention to ongoing vulnerabilities within the prison system in handling staff integrity.

== Prosecuting agencies ==
=== Serious Fraud Office ===
The Serious Fraud Office (SFO) is the lead law enforcement agency for investigating and prosecuting serious financial crimes, including bribery and corruption. In 2020, the SFO reported that it had seen a 40 percent increase in cases involving public officials, central and local government, in the past five years.

=== Electoral Commission ===
The Electoral Commission is responsible for the administration of parliamentary elections and promoting compliance with electoral laws, including those around the size and transparency of donations. If they believe the law is being broken, they refer the matter to the Police or Serious Fraud Office.

=== Independent Police Conduct Authority ===
The Independent Police Conduct Authority is an independent body that considers complaints against New Zealand Police and oversees their conduct. Under section 12 of the Independent Police Conduct Authority Act 1988, "the Authority's functions are to: receive complaints alleging misconduct or neglect of duty by any member of Police or concerning any Police practice, policy or procedure affecting a complainant; and to investigate incidents in which a member of Police (acting in the execution of his or her duty) causes or appears to have caused death or serious bodily harm."

=== Ombudsman ===
The Ombudsman's role is to ensure citizens receive 'fair play' in their dealings with government entities, and they investigate where required. Over the years the powers of the Office have been extended to include education and hospital boards (from 1968), local government agencies (1975), requests under the Official Information Act (2003) and in 2005, all crown entities.

== Conventions ==
New Zealand has ratified several important international anti-corruption conventions such as the OECD Convention on Combating Bribery of Foreign Public Officials in International Business Transactions and the United Nations Convention against Corruption.

== See also ==
- Crime in New Zealand
- List of New Zealand Police controversies
- List of political scandals in New Zealand
