= Andrew Coster =

New Zealand police officer and public servant

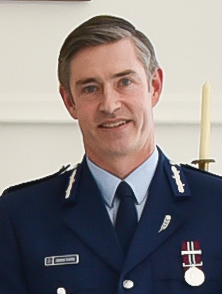
- Coster in 2020

1st Secretary for Social Investment and Chief Executive Social Investment Agency
- In office 11 November 2024 – 3 December 2025
- Succeeded by: Vacant

33rd Commissioner of Police
- In office 3 April 2020 – 10 November 2024
- Preceded by: Mike Bush
- Succeeded by: Richard Chambers

Personal details
- Born: 1975 or 1976 (age 50–51) Dunedin, New Zealand

Andrew David Coster (born 1975 or 1976) is a New Zealand senior public servant and former police officer. He served as Commissioner of Police from 3 April 2020 to 10 November 2024 and was subsequently appointed Secretary for Social Investment and chief executive of the Social Investment Agency, before resigning from that role in November 2025 following an Independent Police Conduct Authority report into police handling of allegations against former Deputy Commissioner Jevon McSkimming.

== Early life and education ==
Coster was born in 1975 or 1976 in Dunedin, and grew up in Auckland, attending King's College. His father is Professor Gregor Coster, the former Dean of the Wellington Faculty of Health.

Coster holds a Bachelor of Laws (Honours) from the University of Auckland and a Master of Public Management from Victoria University of Wellington.

== Career ==
Coster joined the New Zealand Police in 1997. While serving, Coster studied law at the University of Auckland, and briefly left the Police to work for Meredith Connell as a Crown prosecutor. He returned to the Police in 2005 in a supervisory position and went on to serve as Auckland City Area Commander, from 2009 to 2013, and Southern District Commander, from 2013 to 2015. At the time, he was the youngest district commander ever appointed.

After attaining the Wellington-based position of assistant commissioner for strategy and transformation in 2015, Coster was seconded to the Ministry of Justice in 2016 where he was a deputy chief executive leading a court reform project. Returning to the Police in 2018, Coster was an acting deputy commissioner, during which time he was involved with weapons reforms following the March 2019 Christchurch mosque shootings.

=== Police Commissioner ===
Coster was appointed as the Commissioner of the New Zealand Police on 9 March 2020. Another candidate as Commissioner was Mike Clement, the then-Deputy Commissioner. He started his term on 3 April 2020 at age 44, becoming the youngest person to assume the role.

In mid-February 2021, Coster's efforts to combat gang and gun violence was criticised by the National Party's Justice spokesperson Simon Bridges, who described Coster as a "wokester commissioner" in a Twitter post. On 25 February, Coster defended the Police's "policing by consent" policies in response to criticism by Bridges during a Justice select committee hearing at the New Zealand Parliament.

During the 2022 Wellington protest, Coster unsuccessfully attempted to convince anti-vaccine mandate protesters to voluntarily remove their illegally parked vehicles from the area around the New Zealand Parliament in mid February 2022. After protesters refused to vacate the Parliament grounds, he ruled out pursuing enforcement action against protesters due to concerns about violence. Coster instead announced that Police would pursue a policy of "negotiation and de-escalation." Coster's decision to rule out "enforcement action" was criticised by the National Party's police spokesman Mark Mitchell, who claimed that Coster had lost credibility as Police Commissioner. On 2 March, Police evicted the remaining anti-mandate protesters following a violent riot.

In its review of the policing of the protest, the Independent Police Conduct Authority found that, despite a range of recommendations for change, Police did a good job and served the public of New Zealand well in dealing with a difficult and complex set of events.

Following the formation of a National-led coalition government after the 2023 New Zealand general election, Police Minister Mitchell met with Coster in early December 2023 to set out expectations on police and combating gangs. Coster agreed to the Minister's expectations.

In July 2024, Coster announced he would step down as commissioner at the end of his term, which was scheduled for April 2025. That September, it was announced Coster would leave the role sooner to start his next position as chief executive of the government's new Social Investment Agency in November 2024. Acting Public Service Commissioner Heather Baggot stated she was "very pleased" to appoint Coster to his new role, and that "[Coster] is a highly respected and impressive public service leader who has considerable experience delivering initiatives to address complex social issues". In contrast, President of the Police Association of New Zealand, Chris Cahill, took a different view commenting that Coster's resignation was "probably a good call" and that he "hasn't been everyones favourite commissioner".

At the time of the announcement, Prime Minister Christopher Luxon dismissed National's previous criticisms, saying that he believed Coster had been an “outstanding” Police Commissioner. “Since we came to power, we made a really clear set of expectations, as we did with a number of [chief executives], and laid that out really clearly. He has done an exceptionally good job.”

Coster completed his term as commissioner on 10 November, and was succeeded in the role in an interim capacity by the deputy commissioner Tania Kura the following day.

=== Secretary for Social Investment and Chief Executive, Social Investment Agency ===
On 11 November 2024, Coster began his new role as Secretary for Social Investment and Chief Executive of the Social Investment Agency. The agency was established to lead the government's social investment strategy, which aims to improve outcomes for vulnerable New Zealanders through evidence-based policy and targeted funding. Coster oversees the implementation of a $190 million Social Investment Fund, designed to support at least 20 initiatives over four years, with a focus on early intervention and long-term impact. His appointment was welcomed by the Public Service Commission, which cited his track record in addressing complex social issues and his pragmatic leadership style.

On 3 December 2025, Coster resigned from his position at the Social Investment Agency, effective immediately, after being placed on leave following the release of an Independent Police Conduct Authority report into police handling of allegations against former Deputy Commissioner Jevon McSkimming. In confirming his departure, Public Service Commissioner Sir Brian Roche said the IPCA had found serious leadership failures but no evidence of corruption or a deliberate cover-up, and Coster stated that he accepted responsibility for his decisions and apologised to the complainant.

== Misconduct allegations ==
In November 2025, Andrew Coster was placed on leave from his role as chief executive of the Social Investment Agency following the release of a report by the Independent Police Conduct Authority (IPCA) that found “serious misconduct” by senior New Zealand Police officials during his tenure as Police Commissioner. The report centred on how police leadership, including Coster, handled allegations of sexual offending made by a former police employee against then–Deputy Commissioner Jevon McSkimming.

The IPCA found that Coster and other senior executives delayed referring the woman’s complaints to the authority and attempted to influence the course of the investigation once it began. According to the report, Coster expressed concern that the IPCA’s inquiry could “increase Jevon’s victimisation” and adversely affect McSkimming’s prospects of becoming Police Commissioner. It also found that senior leaders appeared “unduly preoccupied” with protecting McSkimming’s career and viewed him as a victim rather than an alleged offender.

During an exclusive interview with TVNZ journalist Jack Tame on 7 December 2025, Coster said that he had briefed both former Police Minister Chris Hipkins and Mark Mitchell on two separate occasions in 2022 and 2024 about McSkimming's extramarital affair before the case became public in 2025. He said he was unable to provide proof that those conversations with these ministers had occurred. Coster also disputed remarks by Public Service Minister Judith Collins suggesting that the police executive leadership had a problem with corruption. In response, both Hipkins and Mitchell issued statements disputing Coster's recollections of those events and defended the IPCA's inquiry's findings into Coster's shortcomings.

== Ranks and postings ==
- 1996–1997: Police Recruit, Constable
- 1997–2003: Various different frontline and investigative roles within Counties Manukau and Auckland Metro area
- 2005–2006: Response Manager/Section Supervisor, Counties Manukau West
- 2006–2008: District Deployment Manager, Counties Manukau
- 2009–2013: Area Commander, Auckland City Central
- 2011–2013: Armed Offenders Squad Commander, Auckland
- 2013–2015: District Commander, Southern Police District
- 2015–2016: Assistant Commissioner, Strategy and Transformation
- 2018: Deputy Commissioner, Resource Management (acting)
- 2018–2020: Deputy Commissioner, Strategy and Partnerships (acting)
- 2020–2024: Commissioner of Police
- 2024–2025: Secretary for Social Investment and Chief Executive, Social Investment Agency

== See also ==
- List of New Zealand Police controversies

Police appointments
Preceded by Mike Bush	Commissioner of Police; 2020–2024	Succeeded by Richard Chambers
