= New Zealand First Foundation fraud case =

In mid-February 2020, the Serious Fraud Office (SFO) announced that it was investigating the NZ First Foundation in response to allegations that the party had created a slush fund. Between 2017 and 2019, New Zealand First officials had allegedly channelled half a million dollars of donations into the NZ First Foundation's bank account to cover various party-related expenses such as the party's headquarters, graphic design, an MP's legal advice, and even a $5000 day at the Wellington races. The amount of donations deposited into the foundation and used by the party was at odds with its official annual returns. NZ First leader Winston Peters has denied any wrongdoing, while fellow MP Shane Jones, the Minister for Infrastructure, has denounced allegations that the party was offering policy for cash as "conspiracy theories."

== Timeline ==
In late September 2020, the Serious Fraud Office announced that they would be laying charges against two persons as a result of their investigation into the NZ First Foundation. Both the SFO and Peters confirmed that the accused were not ministers, candidates or current members of the party. Peters criticised the timing of the SFO's decision to lay charges against the defendants as "politically motivated," describing it as a "James Comey level error of judgment". According to Stuff, Peters had tried unsuccessfully to stop the Serious Fraud Office from releasing its press release until after the formation of a new government following the 2020 New Zealand general election on 17 October 2020.

On 7 June 2022, the trial of two men charged with stealing NZ$746,881 worth of donations from New Zealand First between September 2015 and February 2020 began at the Auckland High Court. At the time, the defendants had been granted name suppression. Prosecutor Paul Wicks QC argued that the defendants had deceived about 40 donors, the NZ First party secretary and the Electoral Commission into believing that their donations were going to the party. In fact, the money had gone into one of the defendants' bank accounts and the NZ First Foundation's bank account. Under the Electoral Act, funds donated to the NZ First Foundation between 2017 and 2020 should have been treated as party donations. According to the prosecution, the NZ First Foundation's funds were being used as a "slush fund" to cover party expenses including leasing and furnishing office space for the party's Wellington headquarters, election campaigning, and fundraisers. Wicks claimed that the defendants rather than the party's leadership controlled these funds.

On 8 June, the party's former director of operations Apirana Dawson testified that the party had established the NZ First Foundation in response to a shortfall in donations. Unlike other political parties, NZ First did not require its MPs to tithe part of their salary to the party. On 9 June, several former NZ First donors testified at the trial. The defendants' lawyers denied that any criminal offending occurred and claimed that the NZ First Foundation had used the funds as the party leadership expected. The party's former South Island vice-president John Thorn disputed the Serious Fraud Office's charge that the party leadership including Winston Peters were ignorant about the workings of the NZ First Foundation.

On 10 June, former NZ First secretary Anne Martin testified that the secrecy around the NZ First Foundation's financial operations could expose the party to prosecution. In addition, the Court heard evidence that the Foundation had loaned the party NZ$73,000 after it incurred election expenses during the 2017 New Zealand general election. The Electoral Commission later determined the loan to be illegal. On 20 June, the Serious Fraud Office testified that the defendants had transferred money into a second account outside of the control of elected party officials. The following day, the Court heard testimony from former NZ First President Lester Grey, who had resigned in August 2019 after Peters and the party leadership had refused to provide him with information about certain party donations and bank accounts connected to the NZ First Foundation. Gray also testified that money raised by NZ First MP Clayton Mitchell was unaccounted for. On 23 June, the Crown concluded its closing arguments against the defendants. The defence concluded its closing arguments on 27 June.

On 20 July, High Court Justice Pheroze Jagose permanently suppressed the names of the two defendants in the NZ First Foundation fraud case. On 22 July, the two defendants were acquitted by Justice Jagose. She accepted the defence's argument that the Crown had failed to prove its fraud case beyond a reasonable doubt. The defence had highlighted the Crown's failure to prove that party leader Peters had been deceived by the defendants. Following the trial, Peters welcomed Jagose's ruling as a vindication and claimed that the fraud allegations were "politically-motivated and spurious." He also accused the New Zealand media of using the NZ First Foundation case to discredit the party and stated that he would hold several unidentified journalists and media outlets accountable for alleged "abuse of power."

In response to the NZ First Foundation trial verdict, Justice Minister Kiri Allan announced that the Government would be introducing new electoral donation amendment bill to widen the definition of political donations to include those donated to third-party entities and making it an offence not to pass political donations to a party's secretary. Other proposed measures include lowering the donation disclosure threshold from NZ$15,000 to NZ$5,000.
