= National Integrity Unit =

- Active: 2020 - present
- Country: New Zealand
- Branch: New Zealand Police
- Type: Law Enforcement
- Role: Internal Anti-Corruption Investigation
- Garrison/HQ: Wellington
- Nickname: NIU

Commanders
- Notable commanders: Inspector Nick Thom

The National Integrity Unit (NIU) is one of the main branches of the New Zealand Police and it is dedicated to investigating and preventing corruption within police. The NIU works jointly with the Independent Police Conduct Authority (IPCA) on criminal investigations into police officers and staff accused of corruption. The NIU was established by Police Commissioner Mike Bush in 2020, in response to the conviction of corrupt Auckland constable Vili Taukolo.

== Investigations ==
Investigations into police staff begin with an assessment of whether an officer's behaviour breaches the police Code of Conduct, policy, or the law. If criminal concerns are raised, a formal investigation is initiated, which is overseen by the IPCA. The NIU was initially composed of 12 staff, led by a Detective Inspector and is based in Wellington.

== See also ==
List of New Zealand Police controversies
