= Serious Fraud Office (New Zealand) =

New Zealand public service department for investigating financial crimes

Serious Fraud Office Te Tari Hara Tāware (Māori)
- Logo of the Serious Fraud Office
- Abbreviation: SFO

Agency overview
- Formed: 1990
- Annual budget: ▼NZ$9,719,000 (Total budget for 2019/20)

Jurisdictional structure
- Operations jurisdiction: New Zealand
- Constituting instrument: Serious Fraud Office Act 1990
- Specialist jurisdictions: Serious or complex fraud, commercial crime, fraud covering multiple lower level jurisdictions; Anti-corruption

Operational structure
- Headquarters: Level 8, 188 Quay Street, Auckland; AUCKLAND 1010
- Elected officer responsible: Hon Mark Mitchell, Minister of Police
- Agency executive: Karen Chang, chief executive and director

Website
- www.sfo.govt.nz

The Serious Fraud Office (SFO; Māori: Te Tari Hara Tāware) is the public service department of New Zealand charged with detecting, investigating and prosecuting financial crimes, including corruption, of a serious and complex nature.

The SFO is New Zealand's lead law enforcement agency for investigating and prosecuting serious financial crime, including bribery and corruption. The Auckland-based agency has about 50 employees of which 90 percent perform front-line activities. It has statutory independence as operational decisions are made without ministerial direction. The agency is based upon its UK counterpart as established by the Serious Fraud Office Act 1990. The SFO was established as a response to the collapse of the capital markets following the stock market crash in 1987.

== Investigation procedures ==
Suspects questioned by the SFO have no right to silence and must answer questions and produce requested evidence, even if it incriminates them. However, evidence at an interview cannot be used against a suspect at his or her trial, unless he or she gives evidence which contradicts their SFO interview. Witnesses can also be required to answer questions under compulsion. Such interviews enable people with confidentiality agreements with clients to speak freely to the SFO without fear of retribution from their clients. These provisions do not override legal professional privilege. Anyone who refuses to comply can be prosecuted and could be fined or jailed. Prosecutions are extremely rare and no one has been jailed for this offence.

== History ==
When set up under the Serious Fraud Office Act 1990, the responsible minister was the Attorney-General.

The Labour government announced in September 2007 that the SFO would be replaced by a new Organised Crime Agency. However, the bill to disband the SFO was delayed by the 2008 general election, and the new prime minister John Key informed Parliament that the SFO would not be disbanded.

In 2008, ministerial responsibility was transferred from the Attorney-General to the Minister of Police, to avoid a potential conflict of interest in the Attorney-General's roles.

== SFO directors ==
Since it was established in 1990, the Serious Fraud Office has had six directors. The following is a complete list:

	Name	Portrait	Term of office
1	Charles Sturt		1990–1997
2	David Bradshaw		1997–2007
3	Grant Liddell		2007–2009
4	Adam Feeley		2009–2012
5	Julie Read		2013–2022
6	Karen Chang		2022–present

== SFO cases ==
- Equiticorp – Founding director Allan Hawkins sentenced to six years' imprisonment in 1992
- Fortex – CEO Graeme Thompson and CFO Michael Mullen sentenced to imprisonment in 1994
- ACC – Former Auditor-General and ACC boss, Jeff Chapman, convicted of fraudulently using documents in 1997
- Otago DHB – CIO Michael Swann convicted of defrauding the DHB of nearly $17m and sentenced to nine years, six months' imprisonment in 2009
- Ross Asset Management – David Ross sentenced to 10 years, 10 months' imprisonment in 2013
- South Canterbury Finance – Director and lawyer Edward Sullivan sentenced to home detention and community work in 2014
- Kang Huang and Others – Kang Huang sentenced to four years, seven months' imprisonment in 2018 for his part in a $54 million mortgage fraud
- Bryan Bruce's 1995 documentary, Serious Fraud, examined the SFO's investigations into white collar crime within New Zealand, and focused on three cases: Allan Hawkins, Roger Curtis and Patrick Renshaw.
- Alex Breingan — Currently facing 33 charges of fraud, UK-born New Zealand television executive producer, television writer and former radio producer.

== See also ==
- Corruption in New Zealand
- Crime in New Zealand
- Serious Fraud Office (United Kingdom)
