= Netsafe =

New Zealand online safety organisation founded 1998

- Formation: 1998
- Type: Nonprofit
- Headquarters: Auckland, New Zealand
- Key people: Brent Carey (CEO) Colin James (Chairman)
- Revenue: NZ$5,667,668 (FYE 30 June 2023)
- Expenses: NZ$4,851,169 (FYE 30 June 2023)
- Website: netsafe.org.nz

Netsafe is an online safety non-profit organisation in New Zealand. It provides educational, anti-bullying and support services. It was founded in 1998, then known as the Internet Safety Group.

The organisation is contracted under the Harmful Digital Communications Act 2015 until 2026. It receives $5.66m funding each year, of which public funding is made up from 3.4m from the Ministry of Justice and $812,000 is from the Ministry of Education.

== History ==
Netsafe was founded in 1998 by a group of individuals and organisations concerned at the impact that the internet may have on young people, as the Internet Safety Group. It was rebranded to Netsafe in 2008.

In 2017, Netsafe created a back-and-forth email chatbot, called Re:scam, which asks scammers never-ending questions with the intention of wasting the time of scammers, and ultimately reduce their number of victims. It simulates grammatical errors and humour to make it more believable.

On 29 July 2021 Netsafe had a meeting with executives from Facebook, Twitter and TikTok in efforts to design a code of practice for online safety. It was anticipated that the draft be completed by Christmas of the same year. In May 2022 Brent Carey became CEO of Netsafe.

In 2023, Netsafe's Youth Action Squad created a toolkit providing information about educating people about issues involving sextortion, cyberbullying, privacy, pornography, and problematic gaming behaviours. In late July 2023, Netsafe launched its campaign on sextortion which is a worsening global issue affecting young people and adults.

== Employment cases ==
In March 2022, Netsafe was ordered to pay $100,000 in damages to three women for a privacy breach involving a stalker. That year, a second case involving alleged bullying was settled confidentially.

== Harmful Digital Communications Act ==
The Governor in Council appointed Netsafe as the approved agency for the Harmful Digital Communications Act for a further term of 5 years until 30 June 2026. In this position, the Ministry of Justice who has responsibility for the Harmful Digital Communications Act contracts the approved agency to receive and accesses complaints about harmful communications, investigates complaints, attempts to resolve complaints, forms relationships with foreign and domestic service providers, and provides education and policies on online safety. Netsafe was originally announced as the approved agency by Justice Minister Amy Adams on 1 June 2016.
