= Harmful Digital Communications Act 2015 =

2015 New Zealand law addressing harmful digital communications

Parliament of New Zealand
- Long title: This bill would implement the Government's decisions on addressing harmful digital communications, which are largely based on the Law Commission's 2012 Ministerial Briefing paper Harmful Digital Communications: The adequacy of the current sanctions and remedies.
- Assented to: 2 July 2015
- Commenced: 3 July 2015
- Administered by: Justice and Electoral select committee

Legislative history
- Introduced by: Amy Adams
- First reading: 3 December 2013
- Second reading: 24 March 2015
- Third reading: 30 June 2015
- Status: Current legislation

The Harmful Digital Communications Act is a New Zealand law that regulates the occurrences and impacts of issues such as online bullying, harassment, revenge porn, and other forms of digital abuse and intimidation. Netsafe is the agency approved by the New Zealand Police to process complaints about harmful digital communications.

== Background ==
Cyberbullying and other forms of harmful digital communications have significant adverse impacts on people, especially those who are children, teenagers, disabled, LGBT, and seniors. The Harmful Digital Communications Act was created to address the issue.

== Key provisions ==
=== Definition of digital communications ===
The Harmful Digital Communications Act defines digital communications as including:

- Emails
- Texts and pictures
- Website content
- Blog posts
- Comments
- Online forums ("Chatrooms")
- Social networks or social media sites
- Phone-based apps
- Voice mail messages

=== Communication principles ===
The communication principles consists of ten guiding principles:

1. A digital communication should not disclose sensitive personal facts about an individual.
2. A digital communication should not be threatening, intimidating, or menacing.
3. A digital communication should not be grossly offensive to a reasonable person in the position of the affected individual.
4. A digital communication should not be indecent or obscene.
5. A digital communication should not be used to harass an individual.
6. A digital communication should not make a false allegation.
7. A digital communication should not contain a matter that is published in breach of confidence.
8. A digital communication should not incite or encourage anyone to send a message to an individual for the purpose of causing harm to the individual.
9. A digital communication should not incite or encourage an individual to commit suicide.
10. A digital communication should not denigrate an individual by reason of his or her colour, race, ethnic or national origins, religion, gender, sexual orientation, or disability.

=== Penalties ===
A person committing an offence under the act can face fines up to $50,000 or two years in prison. If the offender was a company, they can face fines of up to $200,000.

== History ==
=== Legislative passage ===
The Harmful Digital Communications Bill's first reading was held on 14 November and 3 December 2013. The bill received cross-party support from the National, Labour, Green and New Zealand First parties.

The Justice and Electoral select committee released its report on the bill on 27 May 2014. The committee proposed several amendments including changing the purpose of the bill to "deter, prevent, and mitigate harm caused to individuals by digital communications; and provide victims of harmful digital communications with a quick and efficient means of redress." Other amendments including clarifying the definitions of Internet Protocol Access Provider (IPAP), principals and "professional leaders," increasing the penalty level for the offence of non-compliance with court orders, clarifying the liability for online content hosts, and outlining the complaints process. In its minority view, the Labour Party expressed concern about the fast passage of the bill, the lack of wider consultation on the issue of harm, the impact of criminal sanctions on young people and the lack of clarity about the role of the approved agency.

On 24 March 2015, Parliament voted to reject a proposal by NZ First Member of Parliament Tracey Martin that the Harmful Digital Communications Bill be discharged and referred to the Justice and Electoral committee for consideration by a margin of 63 to 57 votes. National and its confidence and supply partners the Māori, ACT and United Future parties voted to reject the discharge proposal while the Labour, the Green and NZ First parties supported discharging the legislation.

On 23 June 2015, Parliament's in-house committee voted to incorporate National MP Amy Adams' amendment into the bill by margin of 120 (National, Labour, Greens, NZ First, Māori Party, United Future) to one (ACT). That same day, Parliament voted to reject ACT MP David Seymour's proposed amendment by a margin of 88 (National, Greens, NZ First, Māori Party, United Future) to 33 (Labour, ACT).

On 30 June 2015, the Harmful Digital Communications Bill passed its third reading by a margin of 116 to five votes. The bill was supported by the National, Labour, NZ First, Māori, United Future parties, and Green MPs David Clendon, Catherine Delahunty, Kennedy Graham, Kevin Hague, Jan Logie, Mojo Mathers, Denise Roche, Eugenie Sage, James Shaw and Metiria Turei. The bill was opposed by Green MPs Steffan Browning, Julie Anne Genter, Russell Norman and the ACT party.

The Harmful Digital Communications Act 2015 received royal assent on 2 July 2015.

=== Amendments ===
In 2022, the act was amended, adding "intimate visual recording" being posted without consent as a form of harmful communication.

== Enforcement ==
The New Zealand Police appointed Netsafe as the approved agency for the harmful communications act. In this position, the agency receives and accesses complains about harmful communications, investigates complaints, attempts to resolve complaints, forms relationships with foreign and domestic service providers, and provides education and policies on online safety.

As of 2021, more than 500 people have been charged under the act, and over 14,000 complaints have been made.

== Effectiveness ==
On 10 April 2024, University of Canterbury senior law lecturer Cassandra Mudgway argued that the Harmful Digital Communications Act needed to be amended to deal with anonymous online abusers and volumetric harassment. Mudgway proposed that New Zealand follow the European Union in criminalising mass online harassment campaigns and pass legislation similar to the British Online Safety Act 2023 making social media companies legally responsible for user safety.
