= Independent Police Conduct Authority =

New Zealand civilian oversight body

- Mana Whanonga Pirihimana Motuhake (Māori)

Agency overview
- Formed: 1989 (Note: It was established as the "Police Complaints Authority" in 1989 and renamed to the current name in 2007.)
- Preceding agency: Police Complaints Authority
- Type: Statutory Crown Entity
- Jurisdiction: New Zealand Police
- Headquarters: Level 10 1 Grey Street Wellington 6011; 41.28493°S 174.77658°E
- Employees: 48
- Annual budget: $6,907,713 NZD; Total budget for 2023/2024
- Minister responsible: Hon. Paul Goldsmith, Minister of Justice
- Agency executive: Judge Kenneth Johnston KC, Chair
- Parent agency: Ministry of Justice
- Website: www.ipca.govt.nz

The Independent Police Conduct Authority (IPCA) (Māori: Mana Whanonga Pirihimana Motuhake) is an independent civilian oversight body that considers complaints against the New Zealand Police and oversees their conduct. It derives its responsibilities and powers from the Independent Police Conduct Authority Act. Under section 12(1) of the Act, the Authority's functions are to receive complaints alleging misconduct or neglect of duty by police employees; or concerning any practice, policy, or procedure of New Zealand Police and to take action as contemplated by the Act. It may also investigate any police incident involving death or serious bodily harm and make recommendations to the Commissioner of Police based on those investigations.

The Authority also monitors conditions of detention and treatment of detainees in police custody. In this respect, the IPCA is one of several "national preventive mechanisms" designated in 2007 under an amendment to the Crimes of Torture Act. Other agencies with responsibility for monitoring places of detention include the Human Rights Commission, the Children's Commissioner, and the Office of the Ombudsman. Together, these agencies including the IPCA, have joint responsibility to uphold New Zealand's commitment to the Optional Protocol to the United Nations Convention Against Torture and Other Forms of Cruel, Inhuman and Degrading Treatment (OPCAT).

== History ==
Before 1989, complaints against the police were investigated internally by police. Following several years of debate about police accountability, sparked in part by the role of Police during the 1981 South Africa rugby union tour of New Zealand, the Police Complaints Authority was established on 1 April 1989. The Police Complaints Authority was made up of a single investigator and a small support staff. The first Authority was High Court Justice Sir Peter Quilliam. Because of its reliance on police to investigate themselves, the Authority was perceived as not being independent. Allan Galbraith, was appointed as the Authority's first Manager of Investigations in 2003 and held that position until 2010. He had been a member of the New Zealand Police for 37 years.

In 2004, a number of historic sexual misconduct allegations dating from the 1980s were made against both serving and former police officers. During that year, Prime Minister Helen Clark announced a Commission would be established to carry out an independent investigation into the way in which the New Zealand Police had dealt with allegations of sexual assault. The investigation was conducted by Dame Margaret Bazley and took three years. It reviewed 313 complaints of sexual assault against 222 police officers, including 141 that Dame Margaret said were credible enough for legal action.

Dame Margaret's inquiry identified the inadequacy of police investigations into misconduct by their own officers and recommended that a more independent investigative body was needed. In November 2007, the Independent Police Conduct Authority was established as a Board of up to five members headed by a Judge. The new Authority was mandated to focus on conducting investigations independent from police.

== Membership ==
The IPCA is led by a board consisting of one full-time Chair and two part-time members. Including the Chair, the Board may comprise up to five members. As a Statutory Crown Entity, the members of the board are appointed by the Governor-General of New Zealand on the advice and recommendation of Parliament, to a term of 5 years. The Chair discharges a range of executive functions and is supported by a senior management team of six managers headed by the General Manager.

=== IPCA Chairpersons ===
- Hon. Justice Sir Peter Quilliam (1989–1992)
- Hon. Justice Sir John Jeffries (1992–1997)
- Judge Neville Clarke Jaine (July 1997 – June 2000)
- Judge Ian Borrin (2000–2007)
- Hon. Justice Lowell Goddard QC (2007–2012)
- Judge Sir David Carruthers KNZM (April 2012 – August 2017)
- Judge Colin Doherty (2017–2023)
- Judge Kenneth Johnston KC (May 2023 – Present)

=== Management and staffing ===
As of 2024, the IPCA employs 39 full-time staff and 9 part-time or fixed-terms staff, including investigators, analysts, legal advisors, managers, and support staff.

== Handling of complaints ==
The IPCA has received an increase in complaints year over year since 2013, with around one-third relating to professionalism and failure to investigate.

Annual complaints received
Year	Complaints
2014	2,193
2015	2,441
2016	2,515
2017	2,592
21018	2,614
2019	3,026
2020	3,882
2021	4,123
2022	4,257
2023	4,449
2024	4,695

=== Investigations ===
The IPCA can only act on public complaints it receives; it does not have the power to launch its own investigations. Each complaint received is assessed for referral to the investigation or resolution team by assigning a category to each:

- Category A: Complaints involving death or serious injury, corruption or serious criminal misconduct, or other serious misconduct usually of a systemic or widespread nature. (Note: The IPCA will not investigate Category A complaints if Police are already robustly and expeditiously responding to such a complaint.)
- Category B: Complaints requiring further investigation by Police, or some form of employment process, before the appropriate action is determined, and is not Category A. These complaints will be referred to the Police for investigation with IPCA auditing the investigation once it has been completed.
- Category C: Complaints which amount to a "reasonable grievance" where the issues are clearly apparent and no further investigation is needed. These will be referred to Police for mediation if the Police agree that mediation is needed, otherwise they will be made Category D.
- Category D: Complaints which will not be investigated or actioned, including complaints considered minor, where the complainant is not cooperative, where the matter is related to an active court case, or if the incident being complained about is older than 1 year.

In 2024, the IPCA chose to investigate only 1% of complaints received, referring 22% back to Police, and declining 74% of complaints.

=== Resolutions ===
If a complaint may lead to an officer being charged with a criminal offence, the police are required to conduct an investigation, as the IPCA does not have the power to lay charges. However, the IPCA can conduct a parallel investigation, oversee or directing the police investigation, or reviewing the police investigation once it is completed.

== Effectiveness and criticism ==
The IPCA's effectiveness has been the subject of public debate and media coverage since the organisation was reformed in 2007. The significant disparity in the size and budget of the IPCA relative to that of New Zealand Police is the most frequently discussed criticism which is thought to hinder the full potential of the IPCA. Many past chairpersons of the IPCA have explicitly stated that the authority does not have enough budget or resources to be as effective as it should be. While most members of the New Zealand public support increasing the available resources and enforcement powers of the IPCA as a means of ensuring high levels of trust in police. For the few matters that the IPCA does investigate, a lack of resources can lead to long response times of several years before the IPCA releases the findings of their investigations.

The IPCA has no ability to prosecute police or enforce any sanctions, and can only make recommendations by way of official reports, which the police are not obliged to follow or accept. A significant number of IPCA complaints are referred back to police, so that police are ones who investigate police, albeit with an IPCA audit of the investigation once it has been concluded – a practice that has received much criticism in the media and academia.

The IPCA does not make all of its findings public, and it is exempt from complying with the Official Information Act (OIA). A lack of accountability under the OIA makes it easier for the IPCA to conduct investigations and maintain confidentiality with police and complainants, but it likewise presents challenges in ensuring transparency and open justice. In particular, as has been pointed out over the years, the IPCA has said virtually all fatal shootings by police were justifiable however the reasoning behind these conclusions is not known.

== Significant IPCA reports ==
When it completes an investigation, the IPCA releases either full reports or summary reports, which are made publicly available on the IPCA website. Historical reports are also available as are the IPCA audits of police investigations.

=== Deaths from police vehicle pursuits ===
In 2009, the IPCA released a report which found that out of 137 recent chases, only 31 were started because of known criminal activity. The IPCA recommended that the decision to pursue be based on known facts, rather than general suspicion or speculation about the offender and suggested police make "the risk to public safety from not stopping an offender" the main consideration, however Police have chosen not to implement this recommendation. After the deaths of three people in a police pursuit in 2012, the IPCA recommended that pursuit policy would should require officers to "state a reason for beginning a pursuit." It also recommended compulsory alcohol and drug testing of police officers involved in fatal incidents.

=== Failures to investigate Wairarapa sexual abuse cases in 2008 ===
In 2008 there was a public scandal regarding the failure of police to investigate a backlog of sexual abuse cases in the Wairarapa. The head of the Masterton Criminal Investigation Bureau (CIB), Detective Senior Sergeant Mark McHattie, received an unspecified disciplinary outcome and has since been promoted to head of the Auckland CIB's serious crime unit.

In 2011, the IPCA released a report on the outcome of its Inquiry into Police handling of child abuse cases which began in August 2009. The IPCA found that there were serious failures in the Police investigation of child abuse, including poor case management, poor workload management, and poor supervision.

=== Deaths in police custody ===
In June 2012 the IPCA released a comprehensive report on deaths in police custody between 2000 and 2010. The report revealed there had been 27 such deaths in the last ten years and raised serious concerns about inadequate risk assessment procedures used by police. Following their review, the IPCA made 20 recommendations, including better training being provided to officers about the dangers associated with restraining people in a prone position with their hands tied behind their back and that detainees who are unconscious or semi-conscious and cannot answer questions and/or physically look after themselves "must be taken to hospital".

=== Treatment of teenagers in police custody ===
In October 2012, the IPCA issued a report on the treatment of teenagers held in police custody following reports in January 2012 about two young girls who were detained and strip-searched by Upper Hutt police. The IPCA launched a wider investigation, which found that the number of youths being held in police cells had more than doubled since 2009. The IPCA found that youths were being locked up in police detention with police practices "that are, or risk being, inconsistent with accepted human rights." The IPCA made 24 recommendations into how police could improve the detention and treatment of young people in custody.

=== Urewera raids ===
In May 2013, the IPCA released its report into police action during the Urewera raids which occurred on 15 October 2007. It said police were justified in undertaking the operation but police acted illegally when they entered the homes of people who were not suspects and gave them reason to think they were detained while their houses were searched. The road blocks established by police at Ruatoki and Taneatua used to detain and search people were also "unlawful, unjustified and unreasonable". Chairman Sir David Carruthers said: "The authority recommends that police re-engage with Tuhoe and take appropriate steps to build bridges with the Ruatoki community."

=== Review of police handling of complaints against Deputy Commissioner Jevon McSkimming ===
In November 2025, the IPCA released its report into its findings of serious misconduct by senior members of the New Zealand Police—including the then-Commissioner and two Deputy Commissioners—over the handling of allegations made by a former non-sworn police employee against McSkimming. The complaints arose from a sexual relationship and included allegations of non-consensual sexual interaction, misuse of police property and threats involving intimate recordings; many complaints made between 2018–2024 were never appropriately investigated. The report found delayed referrals to the IPCA, investigations with inappropriate terms of reference, and attempts to influence the investigation so as not to jeopardise McSkimming's potential promotion. While the allegation itself was not determined, the focus was on how the Police responded and the leadership failures that followed. The IPCA made a number of recommendations including strengthening the integrity system at senior levels, improving independent oversight, and enhancing organisational settings to sustain integrity even when leadership fails.

== See also ==
- New Zealand Police National Integrity Unit
- Police corruption in New Zealand
- List of New Zealand Police controversies
