= Criminal Investigation Branch =

- Active: 1886 - present
- Country: New Zealand
- Branch: New Zealand Police
- Type: Law Enforcement
- Role: Serious Crime Investigation
- Garrison/HQ: Wellington
- Nickname: CIB
- Colors: Blue and White

The Criminal Investigation Branch (CIB) is one of the main branches of the New Zealand Police and it is dedicated to investigating and solving serious crime, and targeting organized crime and recidivist criminals. The CIB has existed since the civil Police Force was formed in 1886 by the Police Force Act 1886.

== Frontline CIB ==
The CIB has detectives stationed around the country. Their job is to investigate serious crimes such as homicides, aggravated violence, sexual offending, drug offences, crimes against society, and fraud.

Staff who work in the CIB are drawn from the Uniform Branch who have completed five CIB training modules. They then undergo an intensive period of training in law and the latest techniques in investigation. The training consists of a live-in three-and-a-half-week CIB Selection and Induction Course at the Royal New Zealand Police College. Upon the completion of this course the police officer gains the designation of Constable on Trial. The minimum period of this designation is six months and during this period the Constable on Trial is expected to complete four CIB modules. They are then eligible to apply for the designation of Detective Constable, which the minimum period for this designation is 24 months. During this time the Detective Constable completes six further CIB modules, a Workplace Assessment Book, a three-hour Pre-Requisite exam based upon the content of the 15 CIB modules and then a three-week CIB Detective Qualifying Course. They are then eligible to apply for the designation of Detective.

As well as the frontline CIB squads there are a number of proactive Organized Crime Squads that use covert methods to principally target high level drug offending. Detectives who work on these squads routinely carry out protracted investigations into organized groups or individuals who habitually commit crimes.

== High Profile Investigations ==
High profile crimes like homicide require detectives to carry out lengthy and thorough inquiries. They interview witnesses and gather physical evidence to piece together a case that leads to the offender being identified. Once the investigation is complete, a Crown Solicitor will begin a prosecution against the accused in the High Court.

The detective will then deal with witnesses and expert forensic specialists in preparation for a depositions hearing. This is where a High Court Judge assesses the case against the accused to see if it is strong enough to proceed to trial. If a trial is held, detectives arrange for witnesses to give evidence along with their own testimony.

== Policing Tools ==
Today, most complex crime inquiries are carried out with the help of modern policing tools. A Criminal Investigation Database is used to record and organize information gathered during many serious crime investigations.

Intelligence-lead policing and analytical computer tools are increasingly used to help police detect and suppress crime. Crime mapping is a computer tool that presents police with information on where certain crimes are being committed. Link charting enables detectives to plot the relationships between criminals and their activities.

== Special methods to Investigate Organized Crime ==
Undercover Programme - Undercover police officers are sometimes deployed to detect serious criminal offending, which is often gang-related. They assume another identity and go into the field for weeks or months. When they have gathered enough information to make arrests, the undercover operation is terminated.

Witness Protection - Witnesses who give evidence against gang members and other serious criminals can sometimes feel threatened or intimidated. The Witness Protection Programme monitors these people's welfare and if need be, helps them create new identities.

Threats - The Threat Assessment Unit investigates threats against police staff, judges and court staff and other investigative agency staff. They respond to counter-terrorist threats or situations. The unit also collects and analyses potential threats to New Zealand and visiting government politicians and officials.

Police Negotiation Team (PNT) is a specialist unit of the New Zealand Police dedicated to crisis negotiation. Nationwide, there are 17 Police Negotiation teams, with each Armed Offender Squad (AOS) having a dedicated PNT attached to it. Similar to the AOS units themselves, the negotiators are all part-time volunteers drawn from the ranks of the front line police.

As well as deploying to armed incidents with the AOS, they will also act as an independent unit and speak with suicidal people, offenders who have barricaded themselves in buildings, prison rioters, and kidnappers. They will also deploy overseas to provide support and advice to the New Zealand Ministry of Foreign Affairs and Trade when a New Zealand national has been kidnapped.
