= Broberg =

Broberg is a surname. Notable people with the surname include:

- Beinta Broberg (1667–1752), historical female figure from the Faroe Islands
- Bosse Broberg (1937–2023), Swedish jazz trumpeter and composer
- Charles Robert Broberg MVO (1870–1937), New Zealand policeman
- Charlotte Broberg (born 1969), Swedish politician
- Christian August Broberg (1811–1886), Danish merchant, ship owner and politician
- Gunnar Broberg (1942–2022), Swedish professor of History of Science and Ideas at Lund University, Sweden
- Charles Robert Broberg MVO (1870–1937), New Zealand policeman
- Christian August Broberg (1811–1886), Danish merchant, ship owner and politician
- Gustaf Broberg (1885–1952), Swedish rower who competed in the 1912 Summer Olympics
- Inga Broberg (born 1939), retired Swedish athlete
- Jan Broberg Felt (born 1962), American actress, singer and dancer
- Karin Broberg (born 1973), Swedish geneticist, professor at Karolinska Institutet and Lund University, Sweden
- Kenneth Broberg (born 1993), American classical pianist
- Kirsten Broberg (born 1979), American composer
- Kristoffer Broberg (born 1986), Swedish professional golfer
- Lily Broberg (1923–1989), Danish stage and film actress
- Magnus Broberg (aka Emperor Magus Caligula) (born 1973), Swedish extreme metal musician
- Martin Broberg (born 1990), Swedish former footballer
- Pele Broberg (born 1972), Greenlandic politician, entrepreneur, pilot, Chairman of Naleraq
- Pete Broberg (born 1950), American former professional baseball player
- Philip Broberg (born 2001), Swedish professional ice hockey player
- Ralph Broberg (1899–1938), English cricketer
- Robert Broberg (1940–2015), Swedish singer, composer and artist
- Tejs Broberg (born 1976), Danish alpine skier
- Thomas Broberg, senior engineer for Volvo in Gothenburg, Sweden
