= 1935 New Zealand Royal Visit Honours =

Awards list for New Zealand

1935 Royal Visit Honours
- Previous: 1935 New Year Honours; Next: 1935 King's Birthday and Silver Jubilee Honours
- Type: New Zealand royal honours: Royal Victorian Order
- Date: 21 January 1935
- Country: New Zealand
- Total recipients: 8

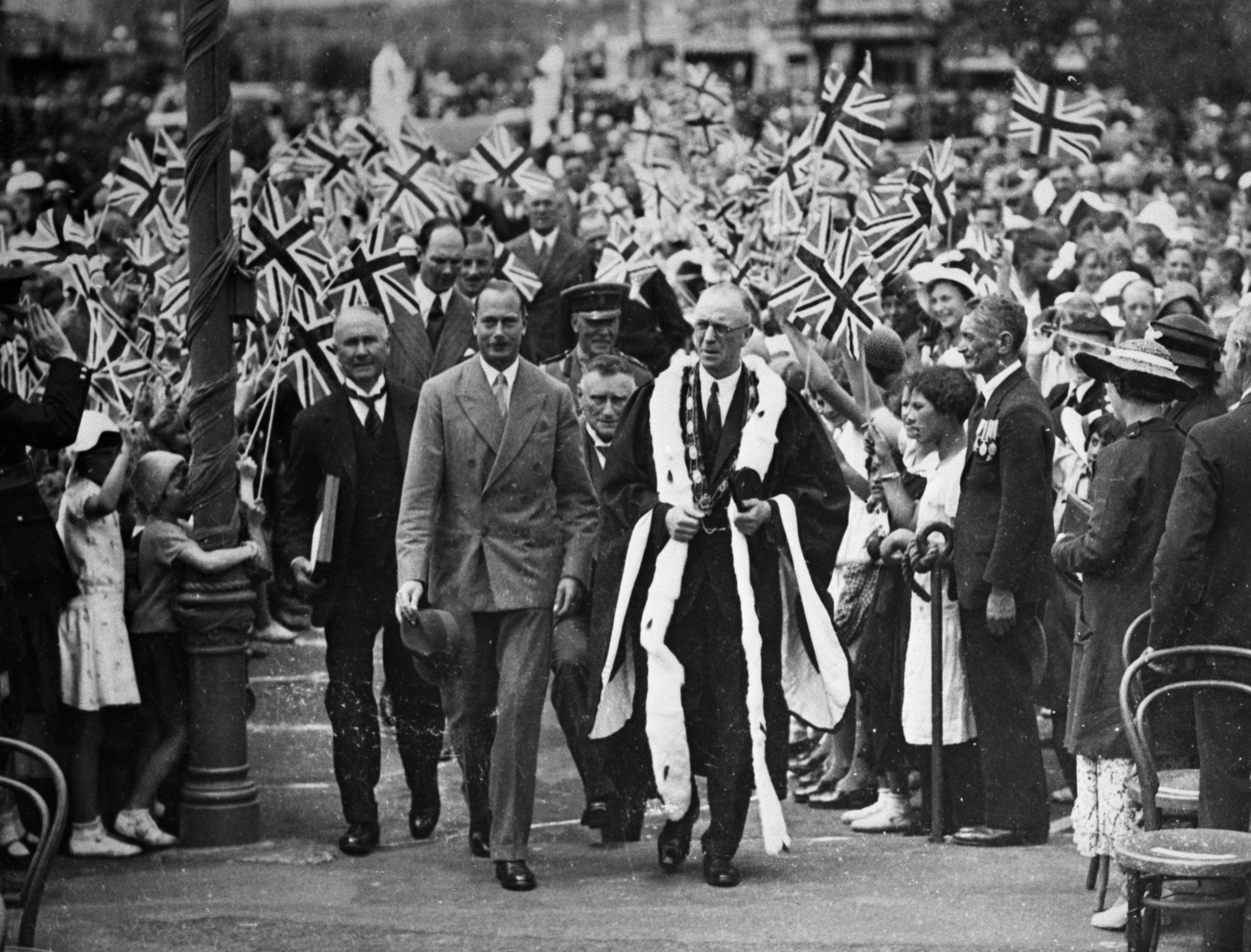
The Duke of Gloucester in Palmerston North during his visit to New Zealand in 1935, accompanied by the mayor of Palmerston North, Gus Mansford

The 1935 New Zealand Royal Visit Honours were appointments by George V of New Zealanders to the Royal Victorian Order, to mark the visit of Prince Henry, Duke of Gloucester to New Zealand that year, and were announced on 21 January 1935. The recipients were honoured for their services in connection with the tour.

The recipients of honours are listed here as they were styled before their new honour.

== Royal Victorian Order ==
=== Knight Commander (KCVO) ===
- The Honourable James Alexander Young – minister in attendance.
Sir Alexander Young

=== Commander (CVO) ===
- Malcolm Fraser OBE – under-secretary for Internal Affairs.

=== Member, fourth class (MVO) ===
- Ward George Wohlmann ISO – Commissioner of Police.

In 1984, Members of the Royal Victorian Order, fourth class, were redesignated as Lieutenants of the Royal Victorian Order (LVO).

Ward Wohlmann

=== Member, fifth class (MVO) ===
- Hugh McAllister Patrick – transport officer for the royal tour.

== Royal Victorian Medal (RVM) ==
- Inspector James Cummings – in charge of the detective force.
- Senior Sergeant John Andrew Dempsey – sergeant-in-charge of transport arrangements for the tour.
- Senior Sergeant Paris Henry Claude Boulton – of Dunedin.
- Ernest Walter Jenkins – head waiter to the Duke on the tour.
