= John Cullen (police officer) =

Irish New Zealand police officer and commissioner

John Cullen ISO KPM (28 March 1850 – 26 October 1939) was a New Zealand police officer and commissioner. He was born in Glenfarne, County Leitrim, Ireland.

John Cullen was the first warden of Tongariro National Park and in 1912, he introduced heather to the park to provide cover for game birds such as grouse, which had been introduced for recreational hunting. The introduction of game birds was an attempt to attract more visitors to the park, however the grouse could not live in the climate of the area. The heather, on the other hand, thrived and is now considered a pest, with conservationists trying to eradicate it.

Police appointments
Preceded by John Bennett Tunbridge / Frank Waldegrave (acting)	Commissioner of Police of New Zealand; 1912–1916	Succeeded by John O'Donovan
