= 1927 New Zealand Royal Visit Honours =

Sports

1927 Royal Visit Honours
- Previous: 1927 King's Birthday Honours; Next: 1928 New Year Honours
- Type: New Zealand royal honours: Royal Victorian Order
- Date: 27 June 1927
- Country: New Zealand
- Total recipients: 7

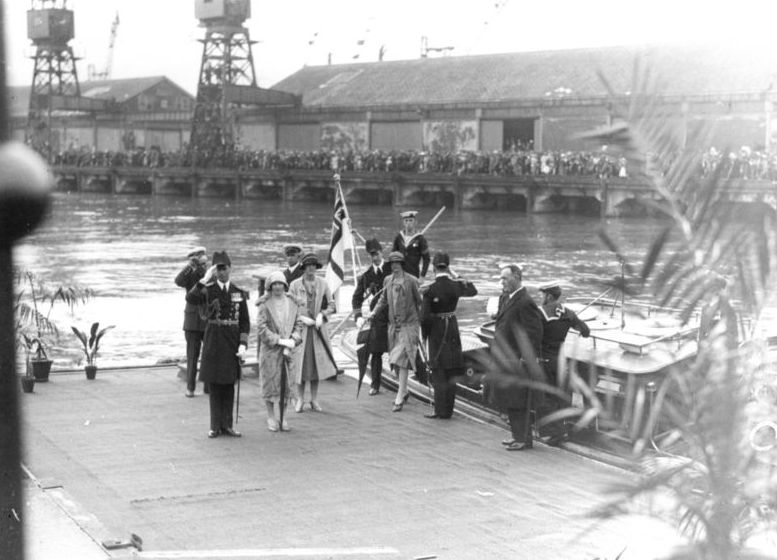
The Duke and Duchess of York in Auckland on their 1927 visit to New Zealand

The 1927 New Zealand Royal Visit Honours were appointments by George V of New Zealanders to the Royal Victorian Order, to mark the visit of the Duke and Duchess of York to New Zealand that year. They were announced on 27 June 1927.

The recipients of honours are displayed here as they were styled before their new honour.

== Royal Victorian Order ==
=== Knight Commander (KCVO) ===
- Sir Robert Heaton Rhodes KBE – New Zealand minister in attendance.
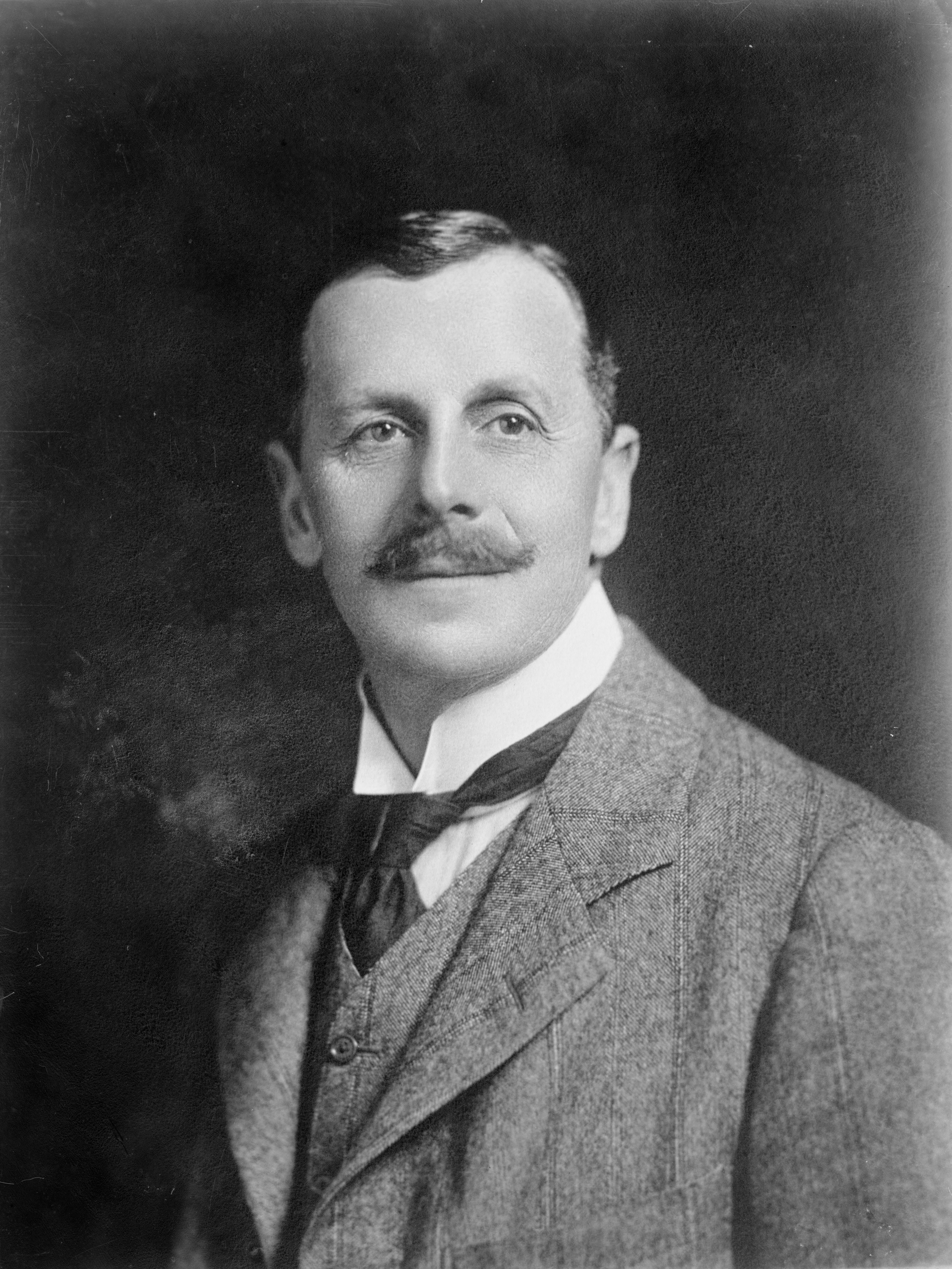
Sir Heaton Rhodes

=== Commander (CVO) ===
- James Hislop MVO OBE – under secretary for Internal Affairs.
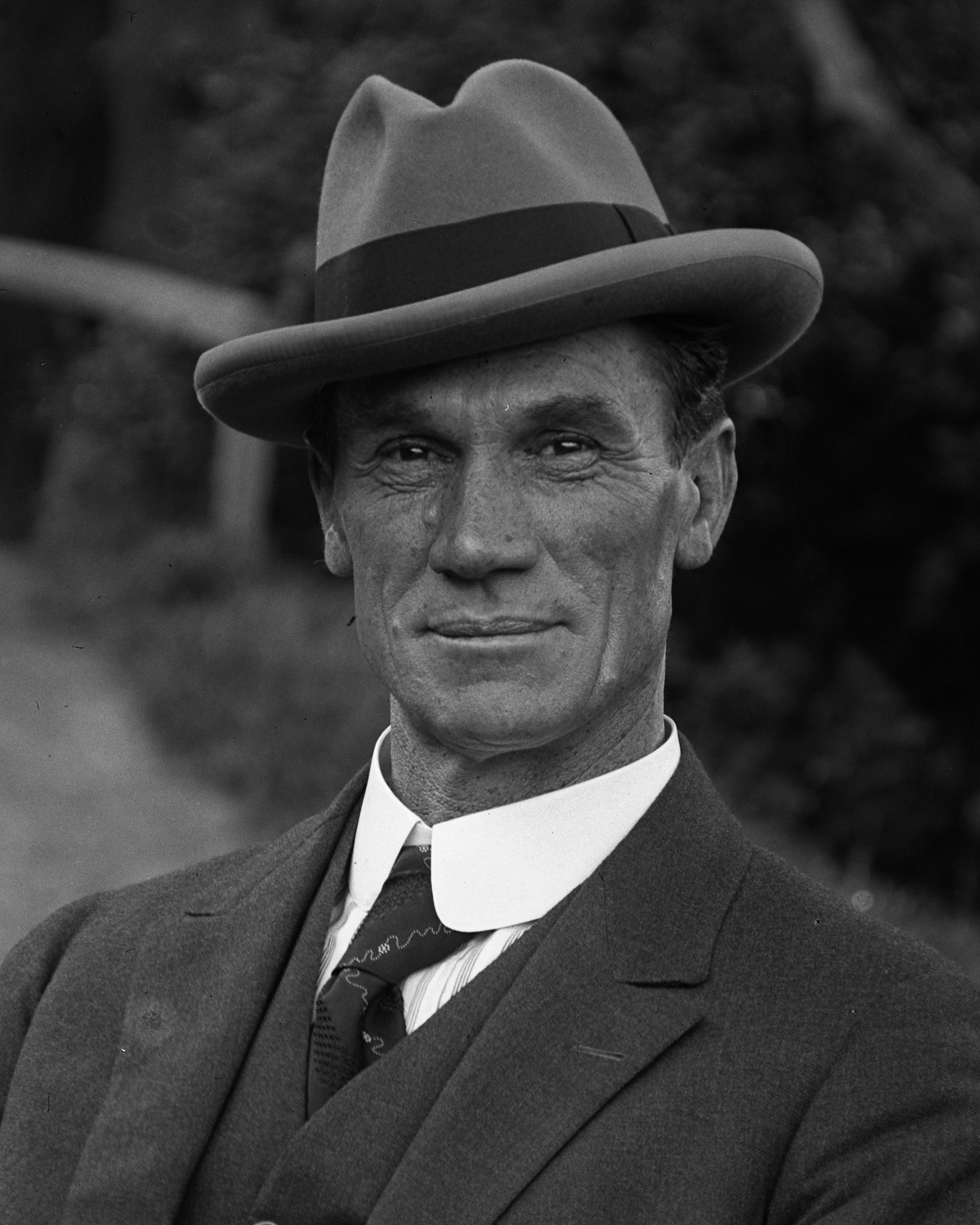
James Hislop

=== Member, fourth class (MVO) ===
- Captain Edward Patrick Ogilvie Boyle – Royal Scots Fusiliers, military secretary to the Governor-General of New Zealand.
- Frederick James Jones – chairman of the Board of Management, New Zealand Railways.
- William Bernard McIlveney – Commissioner of Police.

In 1984, Members of the Royal Victorian Order, fourth class, were redesignated as Lieutenants of the Royal Victorian Order (LVO).

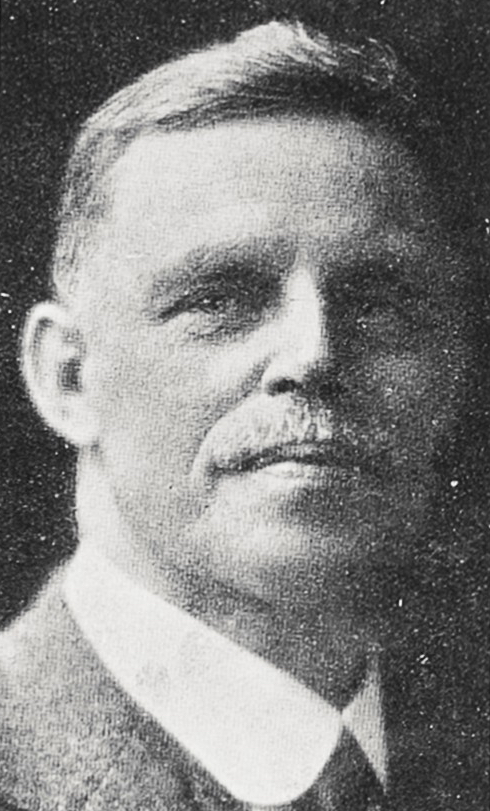
Frederick James Jones

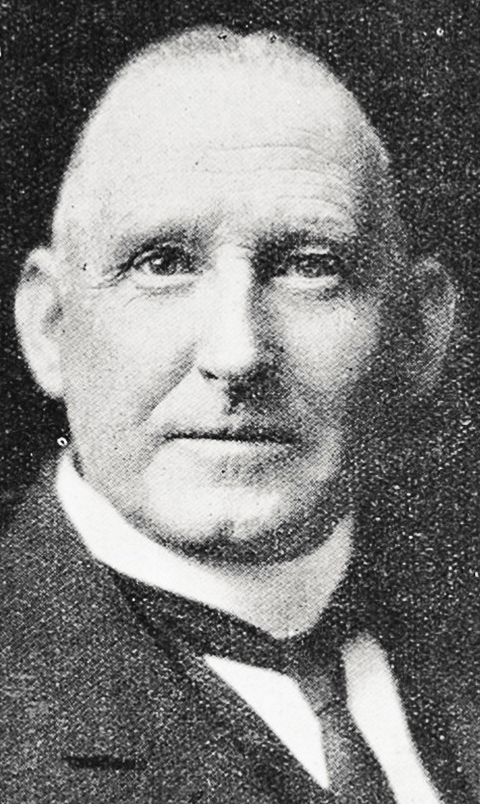
William McIlveney

=== Member, fifth class (MVO) ===
- Charles Robert Broberg – superintendent of Police.
- Henry Raumoa Huatahi Balneavis – private secretary to the Minister of Native Affairs.
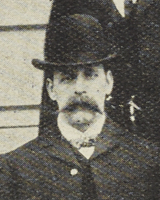
Charles Broberg

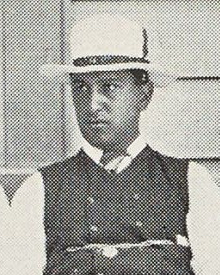
Te Raumoa Balneavis
