= 1920 New Zealand Royal Visit Honours =

Awards list for New Zealand

1920 Royal Visit Honours
- Previous: 1920 New Year Honours; Next: 1920 King's Birthday Honours
- Type: New Zealand royal honours: Royal Victorian Order
- Date: 21 March 1920
- Country: New Zealand
- Total recipients: 8

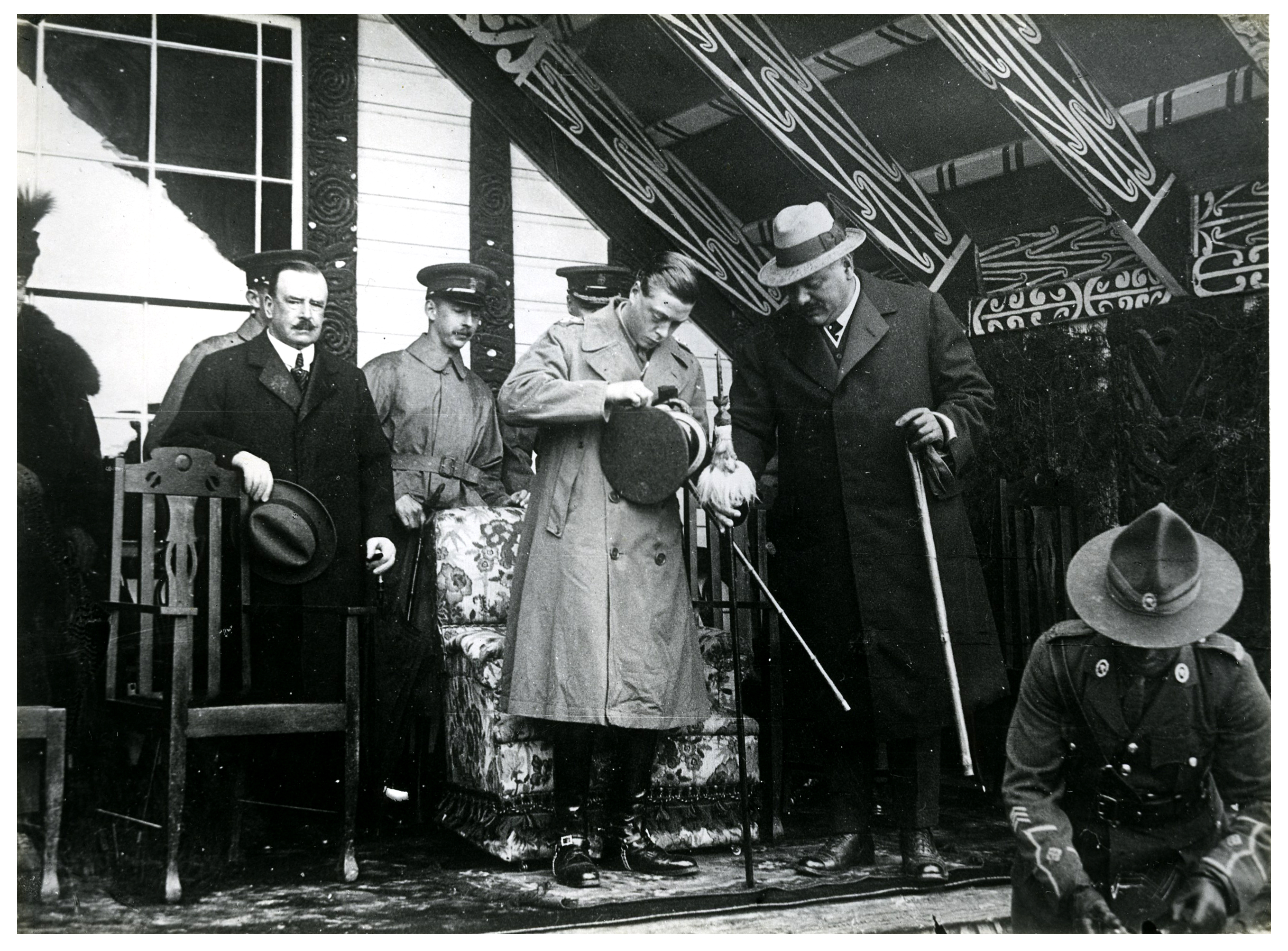
The Prince of Wales at Rotorua on his 1920 visit to New Zealand. On the left is Sir Joseph Ward, and on the right is Māui Pōmare.

The 1920 New Zealand Royal Visit Honours were appointments by George V of New Zealanders to the Royal Victorian Order, to mark the visit of the Prince of Wales to New Zealand that year. The recipients were invested by the prince at a dinner aboard HMS Renown in Lyttelton Harbour on 21 March 1920.

The recipients of honours are listed here as they were styled before their new honour.

== Royal Victorian Order ==
=== Knight Commander (KCVO) ===
- Major-General Sir Edward Walter Clerveaux Chaytor KCMG CB – Commandant, New Zealand Military Forces.
- Sir William Fraser – Minister of Mines
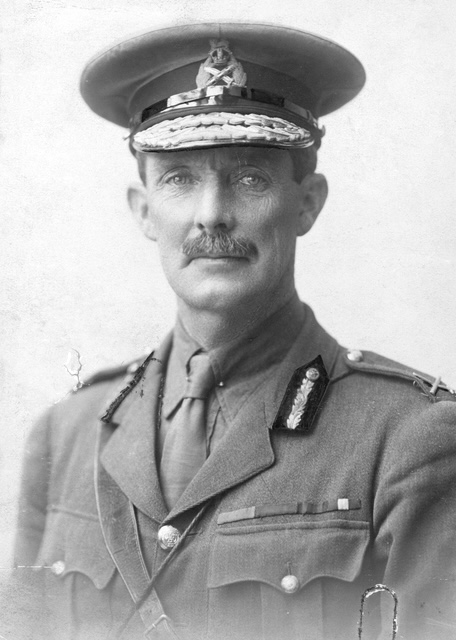
Sir Edward Chaytor

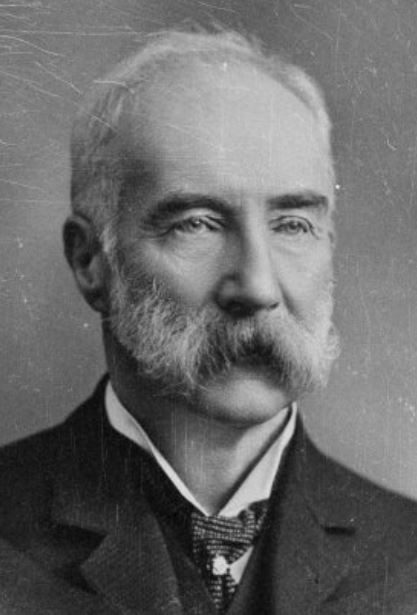
Sir William Fraser

=== Member, fourth class (MVO) ===
- Gavin Macaulay Hamilton – secretary to the governor-general.
- James Hislop OBE – under-secretary, Department of Internal Affairs.
- Richard William McVilly – general manager, New Zealand Railways.
- John O'Donovan – commissioner of police, Wellington.
- Captain Arthur Tahu Gravenor Rhodes – Grenadier Guards; military secretary to the governor-general.
- Lieutenant-Colonel James Lewis Sleeman CBE – Royal Sussex Regiment; director of military training, Wellington.

In 1984, Members of the Royal Victorian Order, fourth class, were redesignated as Lieutenants of the Royal Victorian Order (LVO).

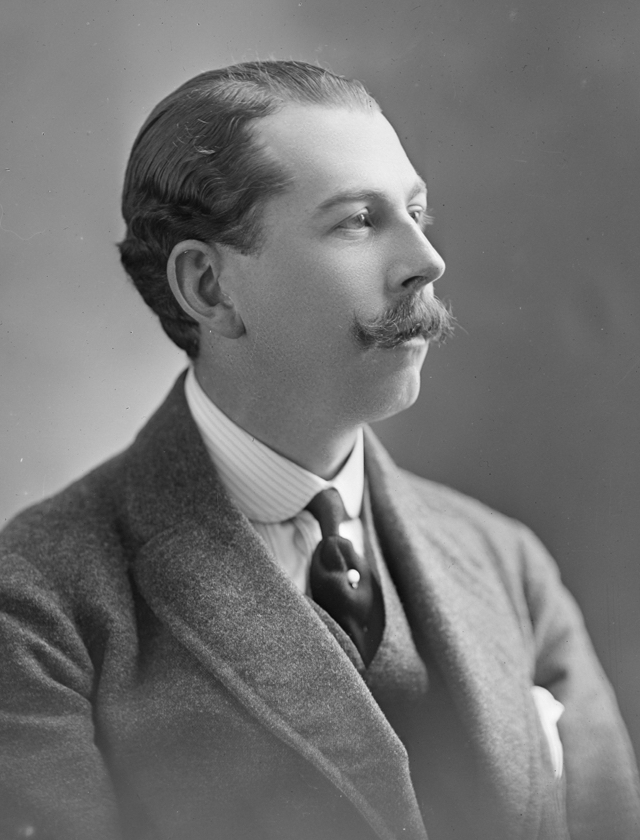
Gavin Hamilton

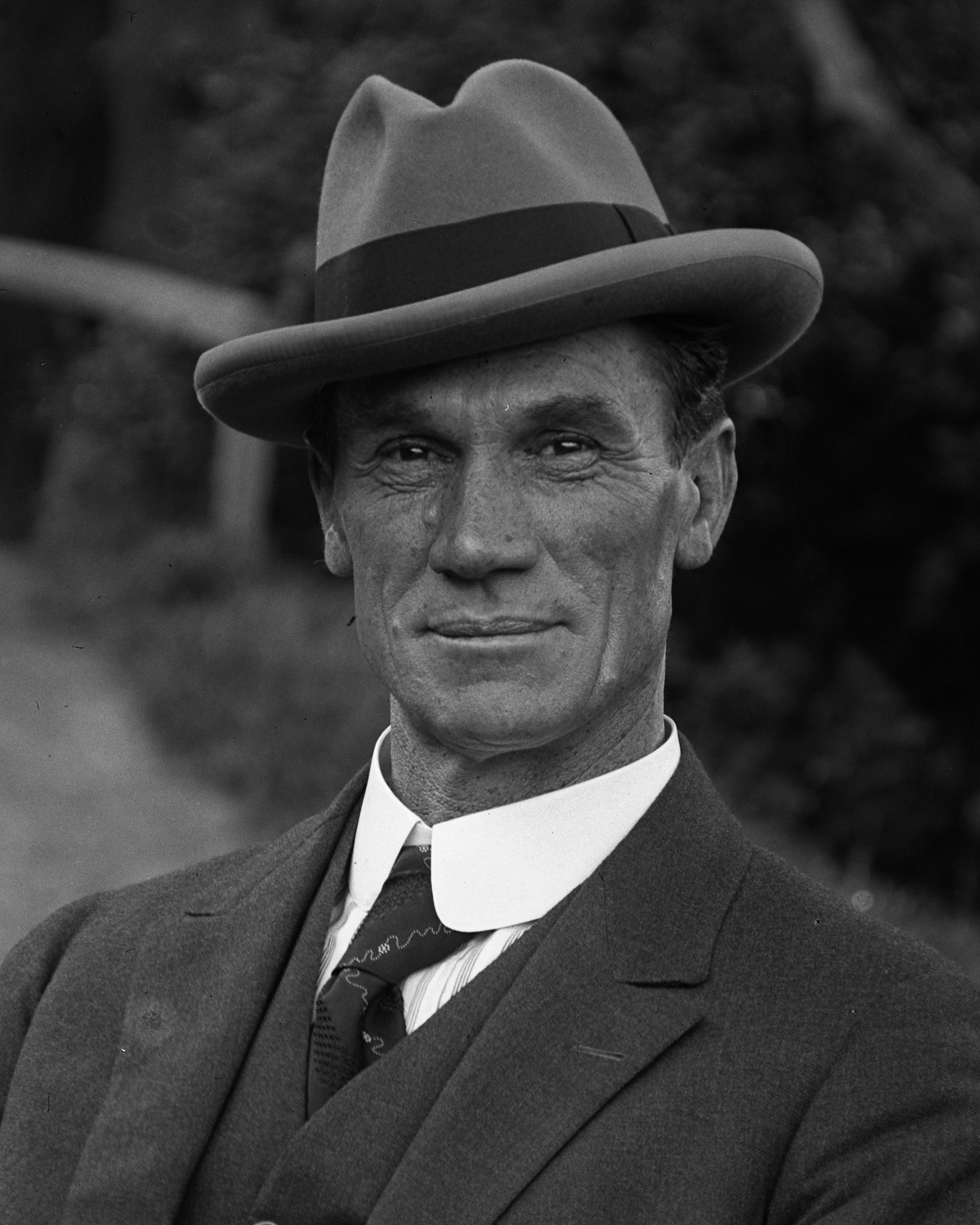
James Hislop

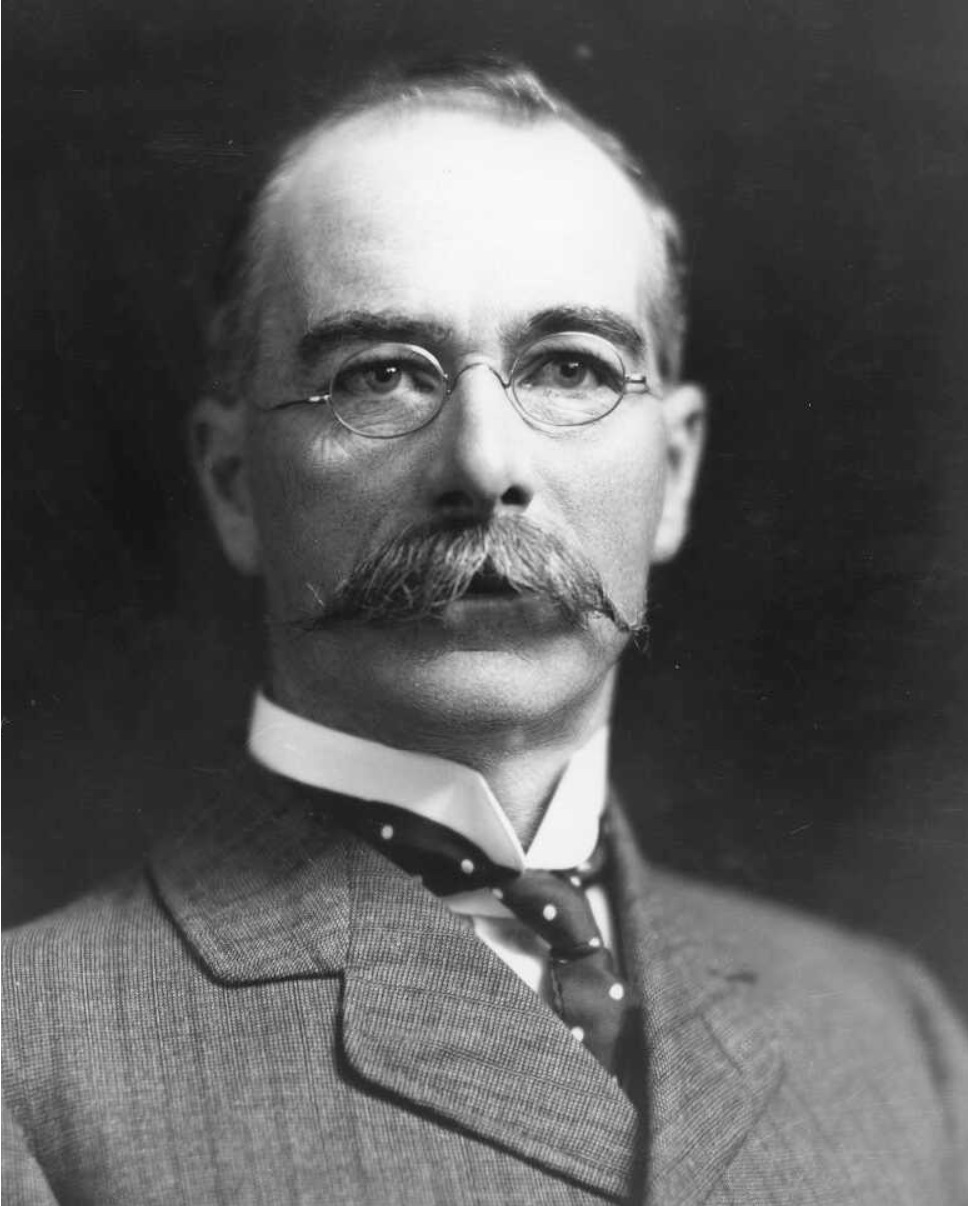
Richard McVilly

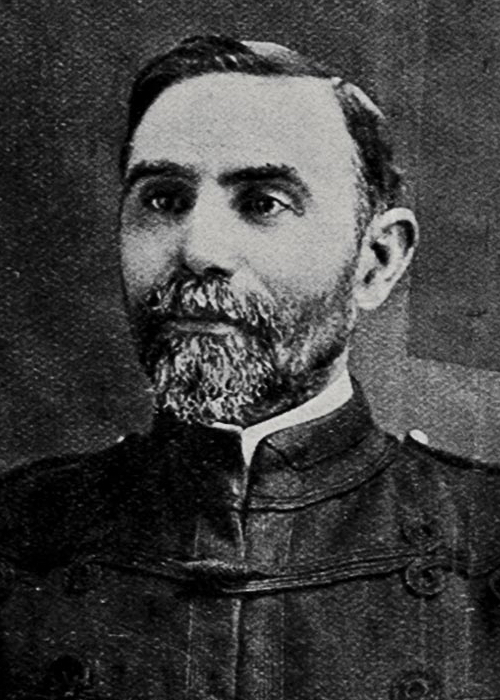
John O'Donovan

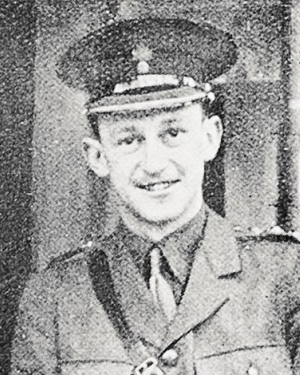
Tahu Rhodes

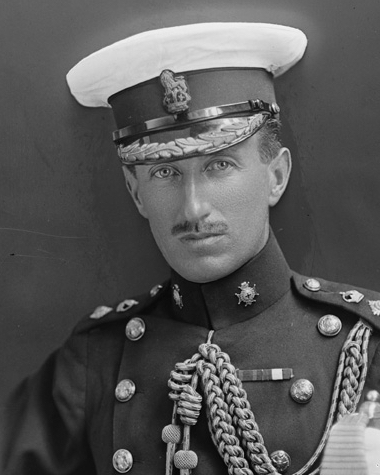
James Sleeman
