= 1934 Birthday Honours (New Zealand) =

Awards list for New Zealand

The 1934 King's Birthday Honours in New Zealand, celebrating the official birthday of King George V, were appointments made by the King to various orders and honours to reward and highlight good works by New Zealanders. They were announced on 4 June 1934.

The recipients of honours are displayed here as they were styled before their new honour.

== Knight Bachelor ==
- Robert Albert Anderson CMG – of Invercargill. For public services to shipping, education and banking.
- George Henry Wilson – of Auckland. For philanthropic services.
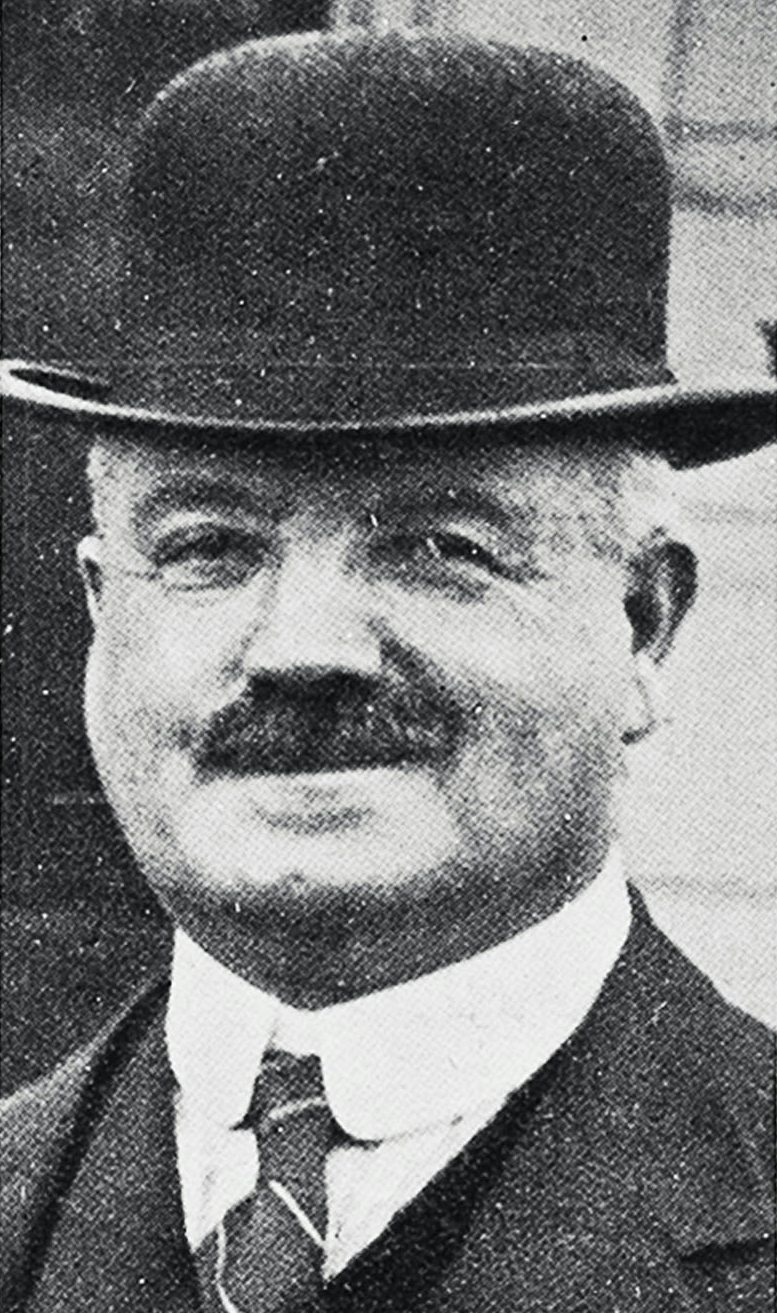
Sir Robert Anderson

== Order of Saint Michael and Saint George ==
=== Companion (CMG) ===
- James Christie LLM – parliamentary law draughtsman.
- George William Hutchison – mayor of Auckland.
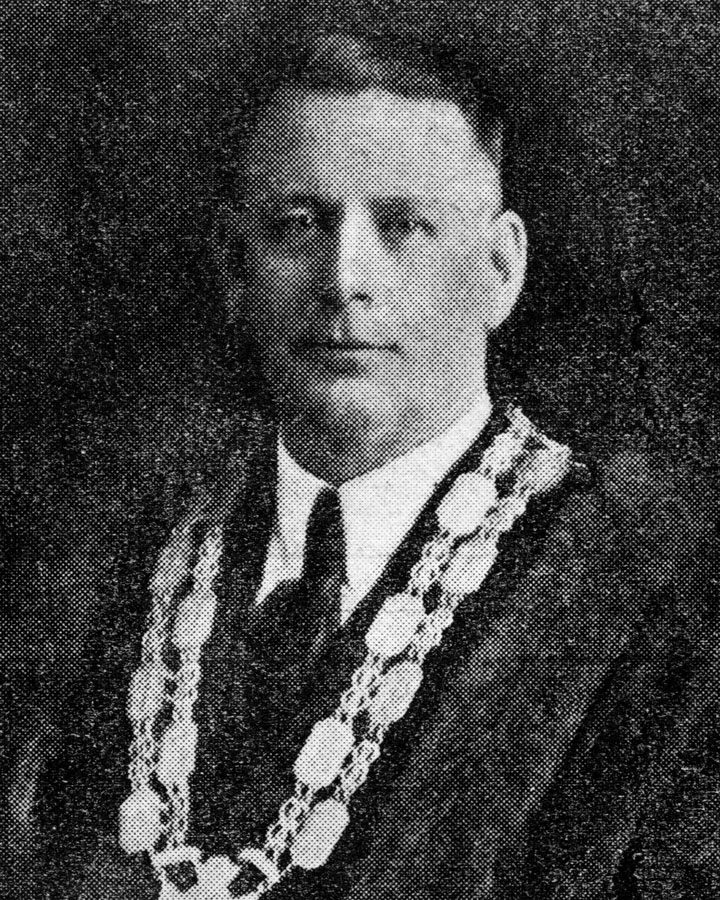
George Hutchison

== Order of the British Empire ==
=== Commander (CBE) ===
Civil division

- Robert Percy Ward – lately under-secretary, Justice Department.

== Companion of the Imperial Service Order (ISO) ==
- Ward George Wohlmann – Commissioner of Police.
Ward Wohlmann
