= 1922 Birthday Honours (New Zealand) =

Awards list for New Zealand

The 1922 King's Birthday Honours in New Zealand, celebrating the official birthday of King George V, were appointments made by the King on the recommendation of the New Zealand government to various orders and honours to reward and highlight good works by New Zealanders. They were announced on 3 June 1922.

The recipients of honours are displayed here as they were styled before their new honour.

== Knight Bachelor ==
- The Honourable Walter Charles Frederick Carncross – speaker of the Legislative Council.
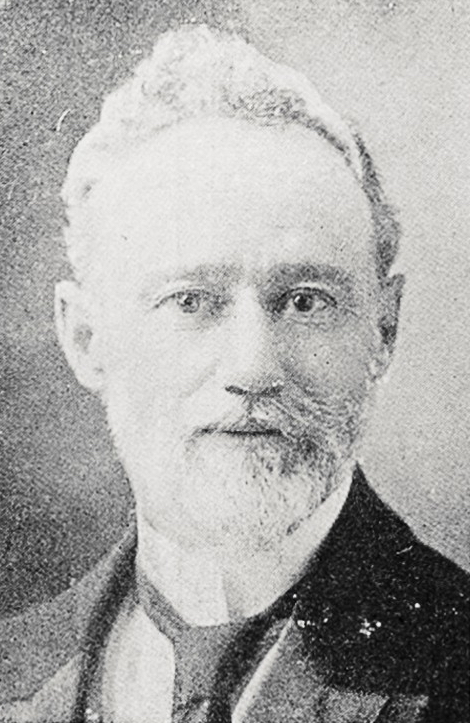
Sir Walter Carncross

== Order of Saint Michael and Saint George ==
=== Companion (CMG) ===
- Joseph Firth – of Wellington. In recognition of public services.
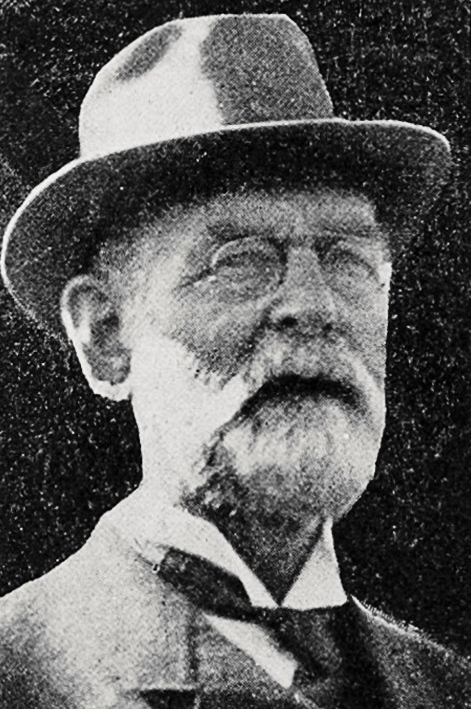
Joseph Firth

== Order of the British Empire ==
=== Knight Commander (KBE) ===
Civil division

- The Honourable Māui Pōmare CMG MD – member of the Executive Council representing the native race and minister in charge of the Cook Islands. For valuable services to the Empire.
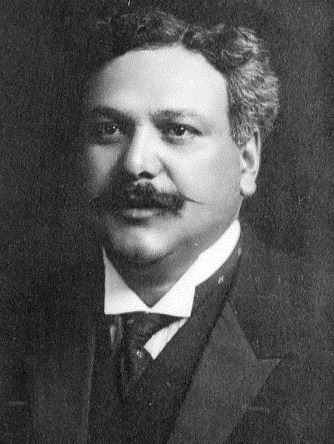
Sir Māui Pōmare

== Companion of the Imperial Service Order (ISO) ==
- John O'Donovan MVO – lately commissioner of police.
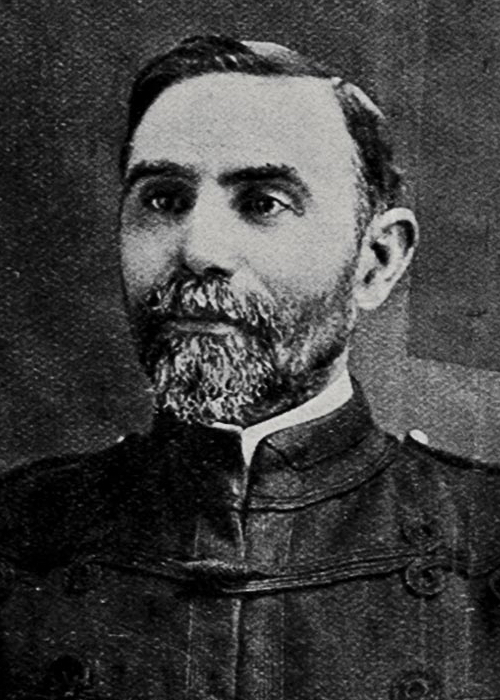
John O'Donovan
