= Ward Wohlmann =

New Zealand policeman

Wohlmann in 1912

Ward George Wohlmann ISO MVO (1872–1956) was a notable New Zealand policeman and New Zealand's 11th Police Commissioner. He was born in Invercargill, New Zealand, on 4 August 1872. He was the son of George Wohlmann and Rebecca McDonald. Ward; and he was noted primarily for his numerous roles during his long career with New Zealand Police but also for the various advocacy roles he was asked to undertake while employed on behalf of the Constabulary.

Fate dealt a hand in Ward's life, from the time he was born.

Ward it seems, could not escape a life in service. He was destined to become a Policeman.. His father before him was a Policeman It was so cold the week of his birth that local Gorges were blocked due to heavy snowfall; there was good news that the Ship the Albion had docked from the Suez bringing 2 weeks worth of mail from Europe. There had been a record number of horses sold at the local sale yard, and it was announced that local Trout had started spawning (in record numbers). Construction of the new local railway was to be commenced and 136,606 gallons of spirits were cleared by customs at the colony; ( not to mention the 60,440 gallons of ale that were already cleared). As well and amongst a lot of other news that week, the nearby Popotunoa Gorge was completely blocked due to snowfall.

In the 1934 King's Birthday Honours, Wohlmann was appointed a Companion of the Imperial Service Order. In the 1935 New Zealand Royal Visit Honours, King George V's 3rd son - Prince Henry, The Duke of Gloucester (on a personal visit to NZ while in Dunedin); made Ward a Member (fourth class) of the Royal Victorian Order, and later that year he was awarded the King George V Silver Jubilee Medal.

Ward first married Jane Cuthill Aitchison on 2 February 1904 in Dunedin and after her death then married Christine Laura Stone on 2 December 1935.

Ward George Wohlmann was a conservative person, reflective of the caution needed during turbulent times in keeping with the needs of the day. He emulated his policeman father and immersed himself in the needs of his occupation, fulfilling them with great vigor and dedication. This conservatism, and his dedication, held him in good stead with the governments of the day and those he supervised and worked with.

Ward ultimately achieved the position of Police Commissioner of NZ, being the 11th Police Commissioner in NZ up until his retirement.

1898 - 1902 Ward then transferred to Administration for some years and on 6 October 1902 transferred to Invercargill to become clerk of the newly constituted Southland Police District.

1904 - Ward married Jane Cuthill Aitchison, herself a constable's daughter, on 2 February 1904 in Dunedin. There he remained as a Policeman on the beat in Invercargill until then Commissioner Walter Dinnie promoted him to the position of District Clerk of Southland.

1906 - Promoted to Sergeant in April 1906, the youngest appointed since 1887.

1907 - In March (Eleven months after his previous promotion ) he became District Clerk in Auckland.

1914 - January until February 1917 Promoted to Senior Sergeant and remained at Waihi until February 1917

1917 - February sent to Christchurch

1918 - January promoted to Sub Inspector

1920 - November 1st Ward was promoted to Commissioner of Police, Western Samoa; to reorganise the Police Force there. This happened when the military management in the country moved to Civil Administration. (then governed under a League of Nations mandate)

1921 -1st January Ward was promoted to Senior Inspector and returned to New Zealand, to take charge of the Hamilton district on 5 March 1922.

Ward died on 2 July 1956 in Auckland and was buried at the O'Neill Cemetery in Onehunga.

Police appointments
Preceded by William McIlveney	Commissioner of Police of New Zealand; 1930–1936	Succeeded by Denis Joseph Cummings
