= Richard McVilly =

New Zealand railways manager (1862–1949)

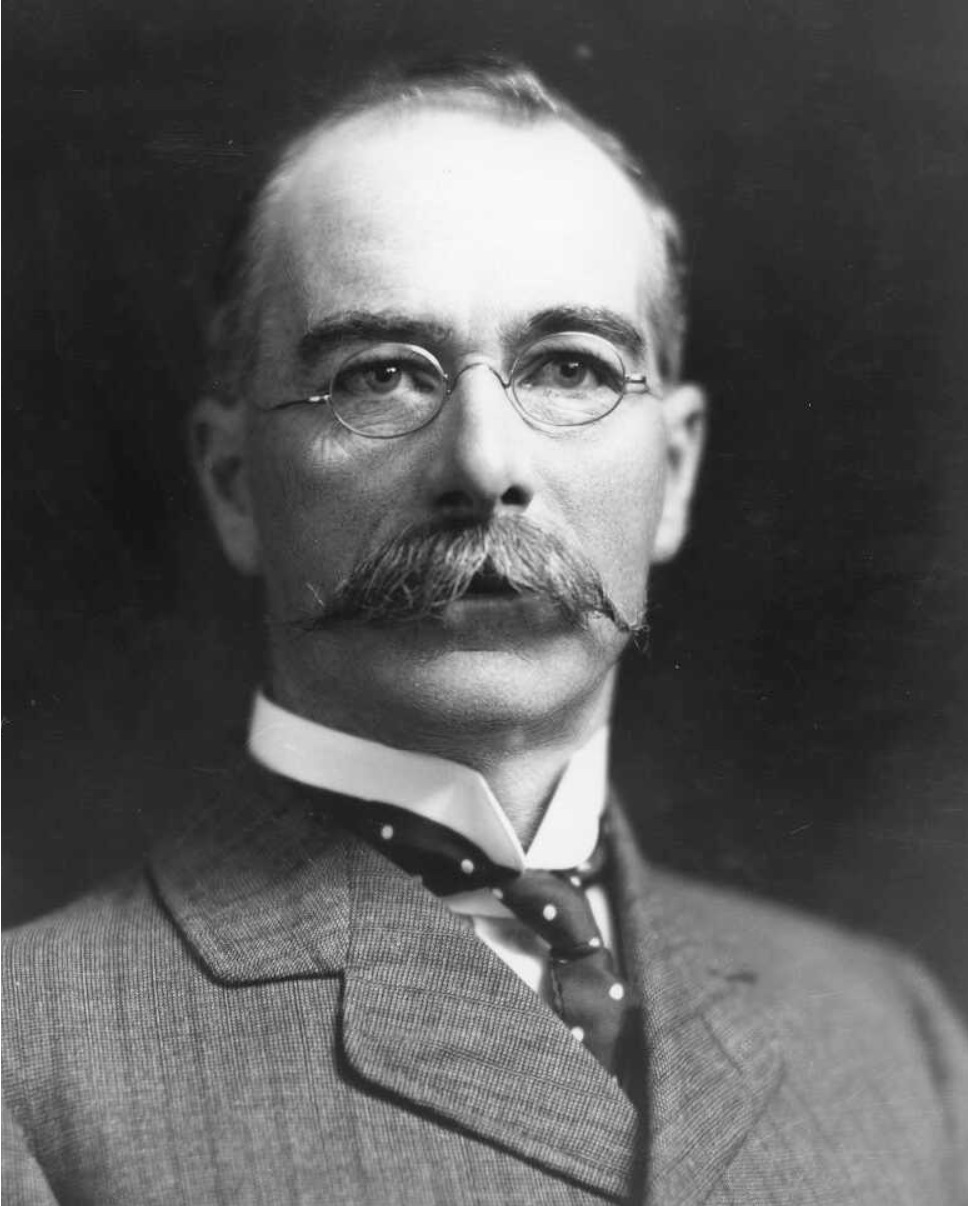
McVilly c. 1912

Richard William McVilly LVO (1862 – 6 April 1949) was the General Manager of New Zealand Railways from 1919 to 1924.

== Biography ==
=== Early life and career ===
Born in Otago and educated in Dunedin and Invercargill, he joined the railways department in 1879.

He was a lawyer and acted in court for the railways department, e.g. in 1909 before the North Island Railway Appeal Board.

During World War I his predecessor E. H. Hiley was serving in the New Zealand Expeditionary Force, so McVilly was acting General Manager.

In 1919 he was appointed as General Manager. and retired in 1924.

He was made a member of the Victorian Order in the 1920 New Zealand Royal Visit Honours. After retiring he was Managing Director of Black and White Cabs in Wellington.

=== Political career ===
He was elected a Wellington City Councillor in 1927. Although councillors were rarely given a committee chairmanship during their first term, McVilly was made chairman of the council staff committee. Elected on the Citizens League ticket he was defeated at the 1929 election standing as an independent. He made another attempt at standing for the city council in 1938 but was unsuccessful.

=== Other activities ===
He was a keen sportsman, was president of the New Zealand Amateur Athletic Association for 15 years and the first honorary life member) presented the McVilly Cup, was Chairman of the New Zealand Rowing Association, and was a member of the New Zealand and Wellington Rowing Associations.
