= Denis Joseph Cummings =

New Zealand police commissioner

Denis Joseph Cummings CBE (16 May 1885 – 31 March 1956) was a New Zealand policeman and police commissioner. He was born in Tuapeka Flat, South Otago, New Zealand, on 16 May 1885. He was the brother of James Cummings.

In the 1946 New Year Honours, Cummings was appointed a Commander of the Order of the British Empire.

Police appointments
Preceded by Ward Wohlmann	Commissioner of Police of New Zealand; 1936–1944	Succeeded by James Cummings
