= Peter Doone =

New Zealand police officer

Peter Doone is a New Zealand police officer who served as the Commissioner of Police from 1 July 1996 to 25 January 2000.

A qualified lawyer, Doone has a master's degrees in law from Victoria University of Wellington and Public Administration from Harvard University. He served with the New Zealand Police for over 30 years.

Doone resigned as Police Commissioner in 2000 following allegations, published in The Sunday Star-Times, that he had prevented the breath testing of his partner Robyn, who had driven the car they occupied, by telling the officer "that won't be necessary". Both Doone and the officer involved denied this happened. Doone sued the Sunday Star-Times for defamation in 2005 but the paper revealed they had checked the story with Prime Minister Helen Clark. She confirmed this, but denied that she had made attempts to get Doone to resign and defended being the source as "by definition I cannot leak". Clark also responded by saying that National supporters had funded Mr Doone's defamation suit.

Police appointments
Preceded by Richard Macdonald	Commissioner of Police of New Zealand; 1996–2000	Succeeded by Rob Robinson
