= Raumoa Balneavis =

Early Twentieth Māori Century Public Servant

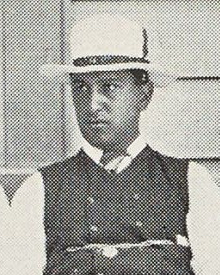
- Born: Hēnare Raumoa Te Huatahi Balneavis; 26 March 1880; Tūranganui-a-Kiwa
- Died: 13 May 1940 (aged 60); Wellington NZ
- Education: Te Aute College
- Employer: New Zealand Government
- Known for: Public Service
- Relatives: Henry Colin Balneavis (grandfather)

Hēnare Raumoa Te Huatahi Balneavis MVO (26 March 1880 – 13 May 1940) also known as "Bal", was a New Zealand Māori interpreter, public servant and administrator. During a public service career spanning 34 years, he served as private secretary to successive Ministers of Native Affairs under five governments and became one of the most respected Māori public servants of the early twentieth century.

Balneavis was born at Muriwai near Gisborne to Jack Balneavis of Whakatōhea and Te Rina Matewai Wirihana, who traced her descent through the lines of Ngāi Tāmanuhiri, Ngāti Kahungunu and Ngāti Rakaipaaka.

== Early life ==
Balneavis was born at Muriwai, near Gisborne, on 26 March 1880. He attended Te Aute College from 1895 before entering the Gisborne law office of William Lee Rees. After qualifying as a licensed interpreter in 1903, he was appointed clerk and interpreter to the Native Land Court at Gisborne.

From a young age, Balneavis demonstrated a strong interest in Māori history and whakapapa. In 1900 he published a letter in the Māori-language newspaper Te Puke ki Hikurangi discussing East Coast whakapapa, the traditions of the waka Takitimu and Horouta, and the descent lines of Ruapani, Tamanuhiri and other Tūranga ancestors. He also invited iwi throughout New Zealand to attend the opening of a new church at Muriwai, where discussions on tribal traditions, whakapapa and waka histories would be held.

== Public service ==
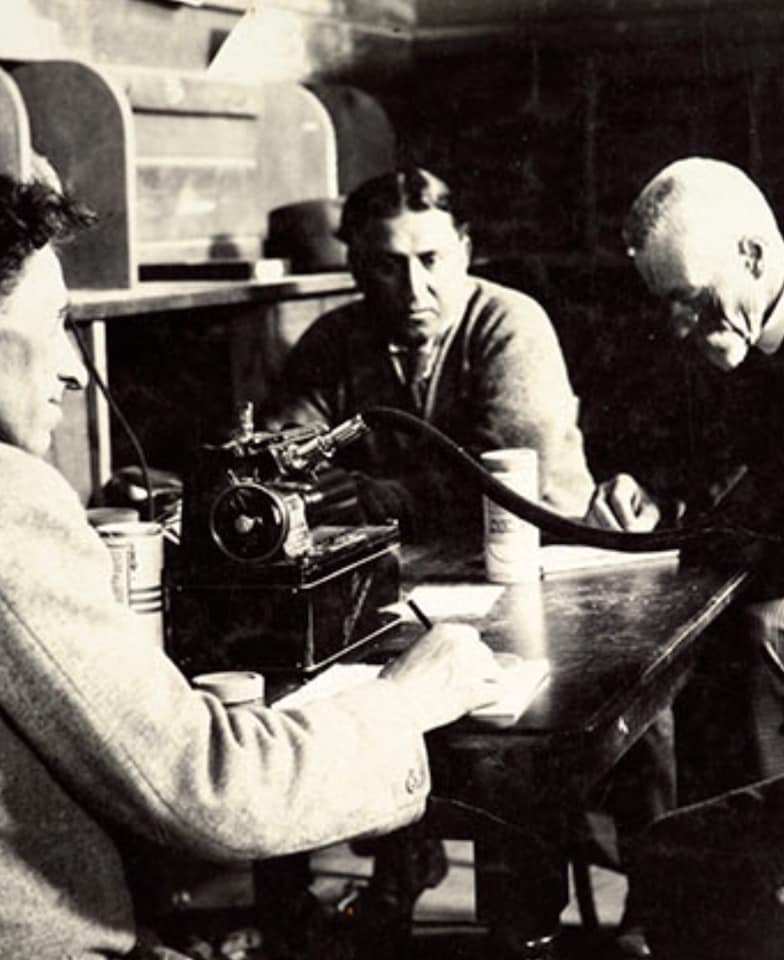
Balneavis (centre) making recordings for the Māori Purposes Fund Board

Balneavis joined the Native Department in 1906 as a clerk and interpreter. In 1910 he became private secretary to Āpirana Ngata, and when Ngata entered Cabinet in 1912 he continued as private secretary to the Minister of Native Affairs. Over the following three decades he served eight ministers under five governments, including Ngata, William Herries, Gordon Coates, George Forbes, Michael Joseph Savage and Frank Langstone.

Throughout his career Balneavis became an important intermediary between Māori communities and successive governments. In 1920 he acted as one of the trustees of the estate of his uncle, Tiemi Wirihana, appearing before the Supreme Court during litigation concerning the interpretation of Wirihana's will and the administration of the Repongaere property.

By the early 1920s Balneavis had also become an established point of contact between the Native Affairs Department and the Māori press. In 1923, Toa Takitini acknowledged receiving the Māori parliamentary election results directly from him in his capacity as secretary to the Minister of Native Affairs.

Henare Ruru later recalled that Māori regarded Balneavis as "a scout in Wellington" for their interests, ensuring that ministers always had authoritative advice on matters affecting Māori. Speaking at the unveiling of Balneavis's memorial in 1946, Minister of Native Affairs Henry Greathead Rex Mason described his reputation for integrity as "above challenge" and observed that he was respected by Māori and Pākehā alike.

In 1929, delegates attending the Wairoa conference of the Kahungunu Welfare League formally acknowledged Balneavis's seventeen years of service as private secretary to the Minister of Native Affairs, commending the assistance and guidance he provided on matters brought before the government. In the same year, Balneavis was among those formally honoured at the unveiling of the memorial to Major Meihana Pouawha at Whakatāne, where speakers paid tribute to his contribution alongside Chief Judge R. N. Jones and Bishop Frederick Bennett during a gathering of more than 1,500 people representing iwi from throughout the North Island.

Balneavis also played a prominent role in the preservation and promotion of Māori history and culture. He served as secretary of the Board of Māori Ethnological Research, the Board of Māori Arts, which later merged into the Māori Purposes Fund Board, and the Polynesian Society. Through these organisations he assisted the recording and preservation of Māori oral traditions, whakapapa and customary knowledge. Balneavis also played a prominent role in the preservation and promotion of Māori history and culture. He served as secretary of the Board of Māori Ethnological Research, the Board of Māori Arts, which later merged into the Māori Purposes Fund Board, and the Polynesian Society. Through these organisations he assisted the recording and preservation of Māori oral traditions, whakapapa and customary knowledge. In 1928, following the publication of the first volume of Ngā Mōteatea edited by Āpirana Ngata, Balneavis was responsible for distributing the work on behalf of the Board of Māori Ethnological Research, with orders directed to him at Parliament Buildings.

Among his most significant administrative achievements was his contribution to the Urewera consolidation scheme in 1921. Mason described the negotiations as one of the largest and most complicated schemes undertaken by the Native Department and credited much of its success to Balneavis's knowledge, patience and tact.

Outside public administration, Balneavis was active in sport. He was a champion golfer, served on the council of the New Zealand Golf Association between 1922 and 1929, and was a member of the Māori Advisory Board of the New Zealand Rugby Union.

== Honours ==
In the 1927 New Zealand Royal Visit Honours, awarded to commemorate the visit of the Duke and Duchess of York to New Zealand, Balneavis was appointed a Member of the Royal Victorian Order (MVO).

== Personal life ==
Balneavis was an accomplished violinist who helped establish the Auckland Choral Society.

Balneavis married Irma Leah Wallace in 1928. The couple had no children. He died on 13 May 1940 and was buried at Whākorekoretekai urupā, Te Muriwai following a tangihanga attended by the Minister of Native Affairs, members of Parliament, judges of the Native Land Court, senior public servants, and Māori leaders from throughout New Zealand.

Irma survived her husband by nine years. She died in Wellington in November 1949 and was buried at the Catholic cemetery at Pukekaraka, Ōtaki, following a funeral service at St Mary's Catholic Church.

== Legacy ==
Balneavis's death prompted widespread tributes from Māori and government leaders. Speaking before his burial, Āpirana Ngata described him as irreplaceable, observing that although governments and ministers might change, "so far as the native people are concerned, such changes are not important beside the loss of such a man as Mr. Balneavis". Ngata further remarked that no public figure involved in Māori affairs had "died so wholly free of enmities", adding that none "had known better how to serve the Maori people, while at the same time keeping inviolate the trust he had from his Minister".

The Minister of Native Affairs, Frank Langstone, similarly praised Balneavis's service, describing him as "the staff in my hand and the light for my feet" in navigating Māori administration. Langstone concluded that "the work of Raumoa Balneavis will never be known fully".

Balneavis continued to be commemorated after his death. On 12 May 1946, Sir Āpirana Ngata unveiled a memorial to him at Muriwai and opened a carved memorial hall erected by Ngāti Tāmanuhiri and other iwi of Poverty Bay and the East Coast in his honour. Speaking at the unveiling, Mason described Balneavis as a man who had devoted his life to helping Māori "build their prosperity and well-being" and stated that his greatest memorial would be the example he had left for Māori youth through a lifetime of public service.

His contribution continued to be recognised by Māori organisations after his death. At the reconstitution of the Tairāwhiti Māori Hockey Federation in 1949, Sir Āpirana Ngata recalled Balneavis as one of the federation's original organisers and noted that only he and W. P. Tamihana remained from its original committee.

Balneavis assembled an extensive library of books and pamphlets relating to Māori history, ethnology and the early European settlement of New Zealand.This became the foundation of the Balneavis Collection that was transferred to the H.B Williams Library by Judge Harold Carr.

Historian Jody Balneavis Wyllie later identified Balneavis as one of the principal Tūranga historians and whakapapa authorities whose knowledge contributed to modern research on Te Hau ki Tūranga.
