= Joseph Firth =

New Zealand cricketer and educator (1859–1931)

Joseph Firth CMG
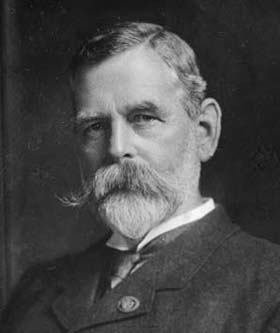

Headmaster of Wellington College
- In office 1892–1920
- Preceded by: Joseph Mackay
- Succeeded by: Thomas Cresswell

Personal details
- Born: 25 March 1859 Wellington, New Zealand
- Died: 13 April 1931 (aged 72) Wellington, New Zealand
- Spouse: Janet McRae (m. 1889)
- Cricket career

Personal information
- Height: 1.96 m (6 ft 5 in)
- Batting: Right-handed
- Bowling: Left-arm fast-medium

Domestic team information
- Years: Team
- 1880/81: Nelson
- 1882/83–1885/86: Wellington

Career statistics
Competition	First-class
Matches	6
Runs scored	199
Batting average	19.90
100s/50s	0/1
Top score	54
Balls bowled	877
Wickets	32
Bowling average	8.06
5 wickets in innings	1
10 wickets in match	1
Best bowling	8/13
Catches/stumpings	10/–
- Source: Cricinfo, 23 January 2015

Joseph "Pentland" Firth CMG (25 March 1859 – 13 April 1931) was a New Zealand educator and cricketer. He was the headmaster of Wellington College from 1892 to 1920. He was born and died in Wellington, and played first-class cricket for Wellington and Nelson in the 1880s. He was New Zealand's representative on the International Olympic Committee from 1923 to 1927.

== Early life and family ==
Born in Wellington on 25 March 1859, Firth was the son of Aaron Firth, a stonemason, and Ann Firth (née Priestnell). The family moved to Cobden on the South Island's West Coast during the West Coast gold rush of 1864 to 1867.

On 8 May 1889, Firth married Janet McRae at the Church of St Michael and All Angels, Christchurch. The couple did not have any children.

== Education and teaching career ==
Firth won a scholarship to Nelson College, and was a pupil there from 1873 to 1875. He taught there as a pupil-teacher until 1881, when he went to Wellington College as a junior master. In 1886, he took up a post at Christ's College, Christchurch, and began studying for his BA at Canterbury College, graduating in 1889. He was asked to become headmaster of Wellington College in 1892.

Among the boys at Wellington College he gained the nickname "Pentland" from his teaching about the troubles the Spanish Armada encountered around Pentland Firth in the north of Scotland. Thereafter he signed his name "J.P. Firth".

== Sporting career ==
=== Cricket ===
Firth played six first-class cricket matches between 1880 and 1886, five for Wellington and one for Nelson. By far the best performance of his career came for Wellington against Hawke's Bay in February 1884, when he ran through the second innings with figures of 8 for 13. Captaining Wellington against Nelson in March 1885, he opened both batting and bowling, taking 3 for 27 and 2 for 19 and making 20 and 54, the highest score in the match. In the second innings he and William Salmon put on 100 for the first wicket, the first century stand made by Wellington batsmen for any wicket.

=== International Olympic Committee ===
Firth was the representative from New Zealand on the International Olympic Committee (IOC) from 1923 to 1927; his appointment by the IOC was delayed as he was quoted in a local newspaper that he was the delegate from New Zealand before he went (representatives are appointed by the IOC itself, not by the national Olympic committee).

== Honours ==
In the 1922 King's Birthday Honours, Firth was appointed a Companion of the Order of St Michael and St George, for public services.

== Death ==
Firth suffered in later life from Parkinson's disease, and he died in Wellington on 13 April 1931.
