= William McIlveney =

New Zealand politician (1867–1956)

William Bernard McIlveney MVO
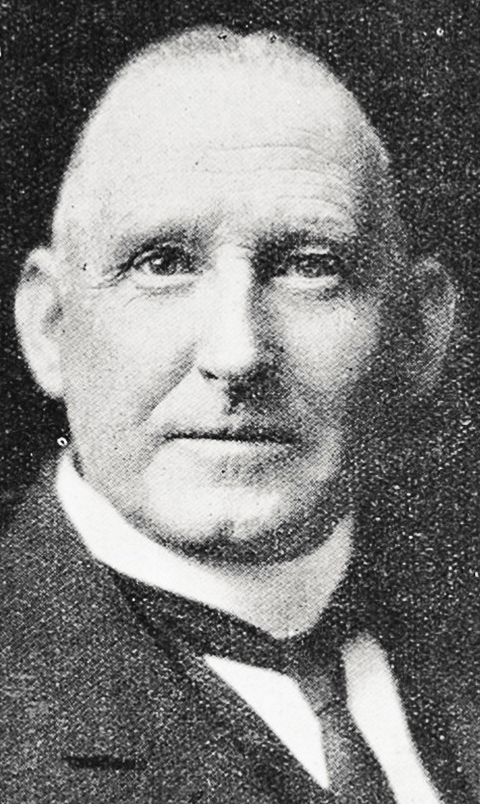

Police Commissioner of New Zealand

Personal details
- Born: 8 March 1867 Greymouth, New Zealand
- Died: 23 July 1956 (aged 89)
- Occupation: Teacher, telegraphist, local politician, policeman
- Awards: Member of the Royal Victorian Order (1927)

William Bernard McIlveney MVO (8 March 1867 – 23 July 1956) was a New Zealand teacher, telegraphist, local politician, policeman and police commissioner. He was born in Greymouth, New Zealand, on 8 March 1867.

In July 1927, to mark the visit of the Duke and Duchess of York to New Zealand, McIlveney was appointed a Member (fourth class) of the Royal Victorian Order (redesignated as Lieutenant of the Royal Victorian Order in 1984).

Police appointments
Preceded by Arthur Wright	Commissioner of Police of New Zealand; 1926–1930	Succeeded by Ward Wohlmann
