= Arthur Wright (police officer) =

Arthur Hobbins Wright (8 April 1861 – 26 January 1938) was a New Zealand policeman and police commissioner. He was born in South Hamlet, Gloucestershire, England in 1861. He was Commissioner of Police from 1 January 1922 until his retirement on 31 January 1926. He died after a short illness in Wellington on 26 January 1938.

Police appointments
Preceded by John O'Donovan	Commissioner of Police of New Zealand; 1922–1926	Succeeded by William McIlveney
