= Royal Commission on London Government =

The Royal Commission on London Government, also known as the Ullswater Commission, was a Royal Commission which considered the case for amendments to the local government arrangements in the County of London and its environs. The commission was chaired by Viscount Ullswater, appointed in October 1921, and reported in 1923. The inquiry was described as an "unmitigated disaster" for proponents of reformed local government in the capital, as the commission failed to reach a unanimous decision. The majority report recommending virtually no change was signed by four commissioners, one of whom added a memorandum of dissent. Two minority reports, each signed by two commissioners, reached differing conclusions. In the event, administrative reforms were not carried out until 1965 following another inquiry.

== Background ==
The commission was established in a response to a resolution passed by the London County Council in 1919. During the First World War the two main parties on the council, the Municipal Reformers and the Progressives effectively formed a coalition. After the ending of hostilities there was initially agreement between the leaders of the two parties and the smaller London Labour Party that public utilities such as electricity supply and public transport in the wide Greater London area needed to be co-ordinated in order to provide for adequate planning for the capital. It was argued that an overhaul of local government was needed, involving the absorption of the central City of London and the outer suburban areas into an enlarged London. There was further impetus for enlargement as London experienced an acute housing crisis caused by both financial shortfalls and land shortages. A large housing programme required expenditure that the limited rate base of the County of London could not meet, while land costs within the county were very high in comparison to those of the surrounding counties.

== Membership and terms of reference ==
The Commission was appointed by royal warrant dated 24 October 1921. The terms of reference were:

...to inquire and report what, if any, alterations are needed in the local government of the administrative county of London and the surrounding districts, with a view to securing greater efficiency and economy in the administration of local government services and to reducing any inequalities which may exist in the distribution of local burdens as between different parts of the whole area

The members appointed were:

- James William Lowther, 1st Viscount Ullswater (Chairman), former Speaker of the House of Commons
- Sir Richard Vassar Vassar-Smith Bt, chairman of Lloyds Bank (resigned December 1921)
- Sir Horace Cecil Monro KCB, former secretary of the Local Government Board
- Sir Albert Gray KCB, KC, bencher of the Inner Temple and Fellow of the Royal Geographical Society
- Colonel Ernest Haviland Hiley CBE, former manager of New Zealand Railways Department
- George John Talbot KC, barrister, chancellor of the Dioceses of Lincoln, Ely, Lichfield and Southwark
- Neville Chamberlain, member of parliament for Birmingham, Ladywood (resigned November 1922)
- Robert Donald, journalist and former editor of the Daily Chronicle
- Edmund Russborough Turton, member of parliament for Thirsk and Malton and former member of the London County Council
- Stephen Walsh, member of parliament for Ince and former Parliamentary Secretary to the Local Government Board

== Evidence heard ==
The commission held its first sitting on 6 December 1921 at the Ministry of Health in Whitehall. It was anticipated that the body would recommend the formation of a new central body as it was recognised that the government of London had become "unmanageable, and patch work schemes and emergency legislation have been necessary".

=== Ministry of Health ===
The first witness was the solicitor to the Ministry of Health, who gave an outline of various authorities existing within the County of London and surrounding areas. He noted how the boundaries of the county were those originally delineated as the area of the Metropolitan Board of Works in 1855, itself corresponding to the area of the "Metropolis" as used at that time by the Registrar-General for the weekly Tables of Mortality. He pointed out that the boundary had been arrived at arbitrarily but consisted of the "City of London and a number of surrounding parishes, which had been gradually added to by successive Registrar-Generals, and appeared to have been formed on no pre-conceived plan, but simply as considerations of convenience might from time to time dictate." He explained that there were no less than 92 authorities within the county, each making rate demands. These included the county council, the city corporation, the Metropolitan Asylums Board, the metropolitan borough councils, boards of guardians, assessment committees, boards of managers of school districts, a sick asylum district management board, an insurance committee and an old age pensions committee. There were also four statutory bodies that exercised powers over a wider area of which the county formed a part, namely the Metropolitan Water Board, the Port of London Authority, the Thames Conservancy Board and the Lee Conservancy Board.

The powers and duties of the authorities and the financial relations between them were described as "complicated in many respects". Within the county itself there were three different mechanisms of rates equalisation as well as overlapping powers. The city corporation was the port sanitary authority with jurisdiction along a considerable stretch of the Thames Estuary and also managed a number of open spaces beyond the boundaries of the administrative county such as Burnham Beeches and West Ham Park. The main drainage area of the county council extended outside the county boundaries, and both the City and the county council had powers to build housing outside the area. The London County Council Tramways operated in conjunction with the systems of adjoining municipalities and companies, while the council's education department allowed children from neighbouring areas to attend county council schools.

The remainder of the Metropolitan Police District was divided between five administrative counties, three county boroughs, seven municipal boroughs, 65 urban districts and 12 rural districts. Their boundaries were "irregular, following for the most part, those of the parochial units from which the areas had been built up, and corresponded neither with the physical features of the districts or with the grouping of the population." There was no correlation between population, size and powers.

=== London County Council ===
The commission resumed its sittings on 13 December at Middlesex Guildhall, where it heard evidence from the London County Council. Ronald Collet Norman, the leader of the Municipal Reform group on the county council presented evidence. The council's case was that when they had first been created in 1889 they had been placed in charge of a "complicated machine". Over time defects in the arrangement had become apparent, and the "machine" while not being obsolete was obsolescent. The council's solution was the formation of an enlarged Greater London with a "central authority" exercising power over it. The area should comprise:

"...the whole continuous urban area ...together with such a surrounding belt as was likely to become of an urban character within a short time."

They strongly recommended that the boundaries of Greater London for local government, police, public transport coordination, electricity and water supply should be made to coincide. They were unable to describe the exact outer boundary of this enlarged area, except that it should be larger than the Metropolitan Police District but smaller than the entirety of London and the Home Counties. The LCC recognised the need for a second tier of local authorities, and suggested that they should have greater powers than the existing metropolitan borough councils. In order for these to be "strong, independent local authorities" many of the existing boroughs and districts would need to be merged into larger units. The evidence from the county council concluded in January 1922 with discussion of health services. The proposed central authority would take over all the capital's voluntary hospitals and become the port sanitary authority.

=== Middlesex County Council ===
Evidence on behalf of Middlesex County Council was given by Sir Herbert Nield, MP for Ealing. The council was in favour of a traffic authority for Greater London, but not of the central authority proposed by the London County Council. Lord Ullswater suggested that the objections to the central authority were simply because it would mean the "swallowing up" of Middlesex. Nield replied that they believed that their county council had been better managed than that of London, and that Greater London was an unwieldy area for a single authority, and that members could not be expected to take any personal interest leading to a huge bureaucracy.

=== Ministry of Transport ===
Sir Henry Maybury, Director General of Roads at the Ministry of Transport was called to give evidence on public transport in London. He explained that since the end of the World War I, there had been a problem of traffic congestion in the capital. This had improved somewhat in the last two years, as additional omnibuses, trams and trains had come into service. He recommended the establishment of a London Traffic Committee of not more than 15 members. The traffic area under the superintendence of the committee should be a circle with a radius of 25 miles centred on Charing Cross. He also recommended an end to the competing services of the various operators "which resulted in loss to all parties" in favour of coordination by the committee.

== Report ==
The report of the commission was published on 21 March 1923. The document in fact contained three reports; a majority report, to which a memorandum was attached and two minority reports.

=== Majority report ===
The majority report was signed by Ullswater, Munro, Turton and Gray. They stated that the evidence presented did not convince them that "any greater efficiency or economy in the administration of local government services in London and the surrounding districts would be attained by any alteration of the existing system on the lines suggested by the London County Council, or suggested by other witnesses." Instead they suggested that the existing authorities in the County of London should redistribute their functions between themselves. They also proposed the creation of a statutory London and Home Counties Advisory Committee to advise the relevant minister on matters of interest to the whole area. The report suggested that transport, town planning, housing and main drainage would be the major functions that the committee would oversee, and that it would cover an area with a 25-mile radius from central london. The committee itself would be made of members nominated by the existing local authorities, the Commissioner of Police of the Metropolis, the railway companies, the London General Omnibus Company and relevant trade unions.

The report recommended that steps be taken to "encourage" amalgamation of the smaller authorities that lay outside the administrative county, but within the Metropolitan Police District. They did not, however, propose any mechanism or specific mergers. Instead they anticipated that the various councils might voluntarily propose schemes to produce larger units. They suggested that this needed to be done in the near future, before development created "further difficulty". They did not consider the case for or against the creation of new county boroughs, as this issue was the subject of another royal commission under the chairmanship of the Earl of Onslow dealing with the whole of England and Wales.

==== Equalisation area ====
The report recognised the great inequality in the amount paid by ratepayers of different metropolitan boroughs. When they examined the rates paid in the outlying districts of Greater London, the variations were even more marked. These inequalities were, in the commissioners' view "unjustifiable". They proposed the creation of an equalisation area whereby districts "closely united to London by business ties should become partners with London". This would comprise the County of London and the fifty-five urban areas wholly or partly within 10 miles of Charing Cross, namely:

- The county boroughs of Croydon, East Ham and West Ham.
- In Essex: the urban districts of Barking Town, Chingford, Ilford, Leyton, Walthamstow, Wanstead and Woodford.
- In Hertfordshire: the urban districts of Barnet and East Barnet Valley.
- In Kent: the Municipal Borough of Bromley and the urban districts of Beckenham, Bexley, Chislehurst and Sidcup.
- In Middlesex: the municipal boroughs of Acton, Ealing and Hornsey; and the urban districts of Brentford, Chiswick, Edmonton, Enfield, Finchley, Friern Barnet, Greenford, Hampton Wick, Hanwell, Harrow-on-the-Hill, Hendon, Heston & Isleworth, Kingsbury, Southall-Norwood, Southgate, Teddington, Tottenham, Twickenham, Wealdstone, Wembley, Willesden and Wood Green.
- In Surrey: the municipal boroughs of Kingston upon Thames, Richmond and Wimbledon; and the urban districts of Barnes, Beddington & Wallington, Carshalton, Ham, The Maldens & Coombe, Merton & Morden, Mitcham, Penge, Surbiton and Sutton.

Within this area two rates would be levied: an Equalisation Rate (General) of 1 shilling and 6 pence in the pound and an Equalisation Rate (Poor) of 1 shilling in the pound. These two rates, it was estimated, would raise about 8 million pounds. The product of the general rate would be distributed among the various local authorities of the equalisation area in proportion to their day population, thereby making those who lived in outer London but worked in the centre, contribute to services in the central boroughs. The product of the poor rate was to be distributed in proportion to the night population of each poor law union: one third being distributed generally and two thirds to unions containing overcrowded areas. These were defined as areas where the population density was more than two persons per room.

The commissioners noted that their scheme could be put into operation rapidly using figures already gathered, and did not involve the creation of any new local or central authorities or officers. It would also discourage excessive expenditure as there would be a uniform rate across the capital and no single local authority would benefit from a general increase.

=== Minority reports ===
==== Hiley and Talbot ====
Hiley and Talbot did not sign the majority report, noting that its "suggestion merely for some kind of coordination of services through the machinery of an advisory committee seems to us altogether inadequate".

In their view the local government of the capital did need to be reorganised. They felt the area was too large to be administered by a single authority. They therefore recommended the division of Greater London into a number of authorities, "with a status approximating those of county boroughs". Certain functions would, however, be reserved to a "central authority". Examples of London-wide functions were tramways, water supply and main drainage. They did not go into detail of either the areas of the proposed boroughs nor the exact division of functions between the two tiers which they recognised would take considerable work to define.

==== Donald and Walsh ====
Donald and Walsh were unable to sign either report, instead producing a 62-page document of their own. Their reasons were that they felt they could not fulfill their commission without recommending a thorough reform of local government, rather than the appointment of ad hoc advisory committees or authorities.

They proposed a single central authority for the entire Greater London area (the Metropolitan Police District with slightly modified boundaries). This would replace a number of overlapping authorities including the London County Council and Metropolitan Asylums Board and would be directly elected except for one sixth of the body, who would be aldermen appointed by the authority itself. The authority would have powers over public transport, town planning, large housing schemes, main drainage, sewage disposal, higher and specialised education, water supply, hospitals, fire protection, large parks and open spaces, wholesale markets and smallholdings. A lower tier of local authorities would be formed based on existing areas: metropolitan boroughs, municipal boroughs, urban districts and rural districts, but each having equal powers and status. They would have enhanced powers, for instance taking over the duties of poor law guardians and becoming the elementary education authority for their area.

== Resulting legislation ==
The only part of the report that was acted on was in the area of public transport. Colonel Wilfrid Ashley, the Parliamentary Secretary to the Ministry of Transport put forward proposals in July 1923 that:

- The Ministry should become the traffic authority for an area with a radius of 25 miles from Charing Cross.
- An advisory committee be formed of representatives of the local authorities, police and other interests.
- The Ministry would act in coordination with the advisory committee.
- The advisory committee should consist of between 15 and 21 members and be constituted as recommended in the majority report.

Legislation to put this into effect was delayed due to a confused political situation. A draft bill was prepared just before the minority Conservative government of Stanley Baldwin collapsed in January 1924 and was replaced by a Labour Government under Ramsay MacDonald. By the middle of March the new government had agreed to introduce the bill, virtually unchanged, to parliament without delay. The London Traffic Bill, creating a London and Home Counties Traffic Advisory Committee for a defined London Traffic Area was introduced to the United Kingdom House of Commons on 26 March. The bill cleared all stages of parliament by August, and came into effect on 1 October 1924.
