= John O'Donovan (police commissioner) =

New Zealand police commissioner

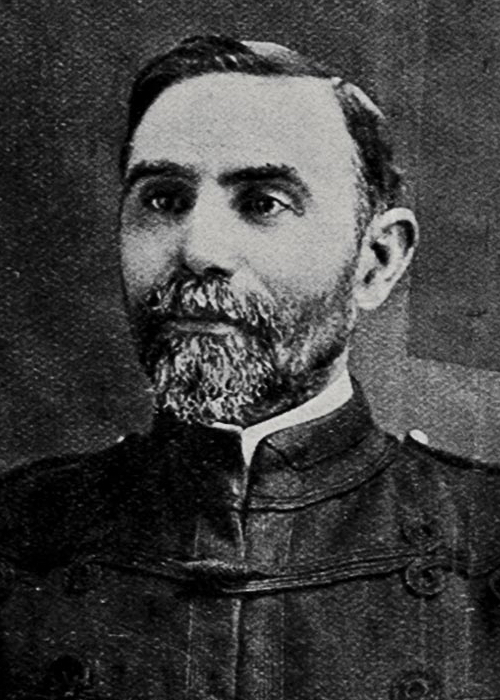
O'Donovan, c. 1908

John O'Donovan MVO ISO (22 May 1858 – 8 April 1927) was a New Zealand police commissioner. He was born in Ross Carbery, County Cork, Ireland, in 1858. He came to New Zealand in 1878 to join his brother Richard, who had represented Okarito on the Westland County Council (1872–1873) and on the Westland Provincial Council (1874–1876).

In the 1920 New Zealand Royal Visit Honours, O'Donovan was appointed a Member (fourth class) of the Royal Victorian Order, and in the 1922 King's Birthday Honours, he was made a Companion of the Imperial Service Order.

Police appointments
Preceded by John Cullen	Commissioner of Police of New Zealand; 1916–1921	Succeeded by Arthur Wright
