= William Salmon (cricketer) =

New Zealand cricketer

Personal information
- Full name: William Joseph Salmon
- Born: 29 May 1846; Sydney, Australia
- Died: 25 October 1907 (aged 61); Palmerston North, New Zealand

Domestic team information
- Years: Team
- 1873-74 to 1884-85, 1886-87 to 1889-90: Wellington
- 1885-86: Hawke's Bay
- 1891-92: Taranaki

Career statistics
Competition	First-class
Matches	12
Runs scored	235
Batting average	11.19
100s/50s	0/1
Top score	50
Balls bowled
Wickets	0
Bowling average	–
5 wickets in innings	–
10 wickets in match	–
Best bowling	–
Catches/stumpings	7/3
- Source: Cricinfo, 20 May 2017

William Joseph Salmon (29 May 1846 – 25 October 1907) was a businessman and first-class cricketer in New Zealand.

== Personal life ==
Salmon was born in Sydney. He moved to New Zealand with his parents in 1864 and was apprenticed to the drapery trade.

He worked as a commercial traveller for the Kaiapoi Woollen Company for the last 23 years of his life, and also managed the company's Wellington branch. When travelling he returned on most weekends to Wellington, where he was a keen lawn bowler. He died suddenly of heart failure at the age of 61 while at work in Palmerston North. He left a wife, Sarah, and a grown-up family of two sons and a daughter.

== Cricket career ==
He played cricket, as a batsman who usually opened the innings and sometimes kept wicket, for Wellington from 1873 to 1889, and also represented Hawke's Bay in 1886 and Taranaki in 1892.

For Wellington against Nelson in March 1885, he and Joseph Firth put on 100 for the first wicket in the second innings, the first century stand made by Wellington batsmen for any wicket.
