= 1935 Birthday Honours (New Zealand) =

Awards list for New Zealand

1935 King's Birthday and Silver Jubilee Honours
- Previous: 1935 Royal Visit Honours; Next: 1936 New Year Honours
- Type: New Zealand royal honours: Peerage; Knight Bachelor; Order of the Bath; Order of St Michael and St George; Order of the British Empire; Imperial Service Order
- Date: 3 June 1935
- Country: New Zealand
- Total recipients: 36

The 1935 King's Birthday and Silver Jubilee Honours in New Zealand, celebrating the official birthday of King George V and the silver jubilee of his reign, were appointments made by the King to various orders and honours to reward and highlight good works by New Zealanders. They were announced on 3 June 1935.

The recipients of honours are listed here as they were styled before their new honour.

== Viscount ==
- The Right Honourable Charles, Baron Bledisloe GCMG KBE – lately Governor-General of New Zealand.
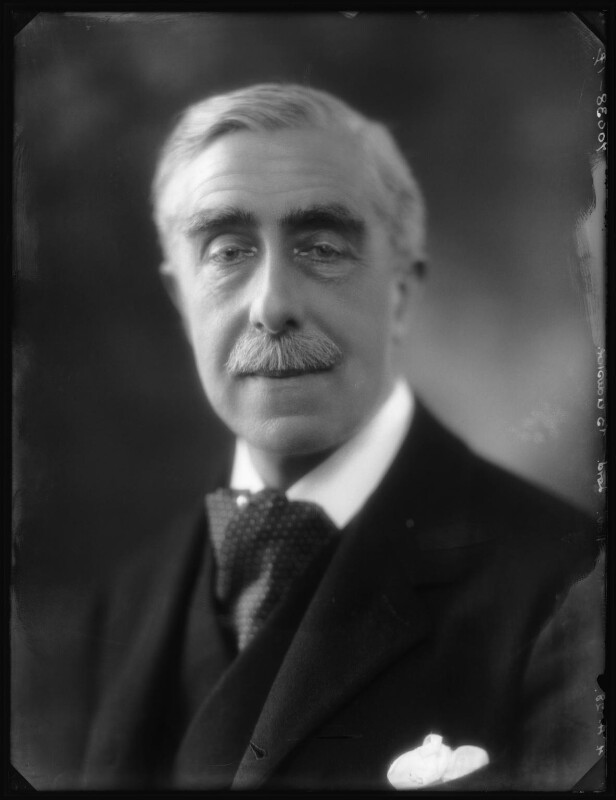
Viscount Bledisloe

== Knight Bachelor ==
- Francis Vernon Frazer – deputy chairman of executive, Commission of Agriculture.
- Henry Horton – of Auckland. For public services.
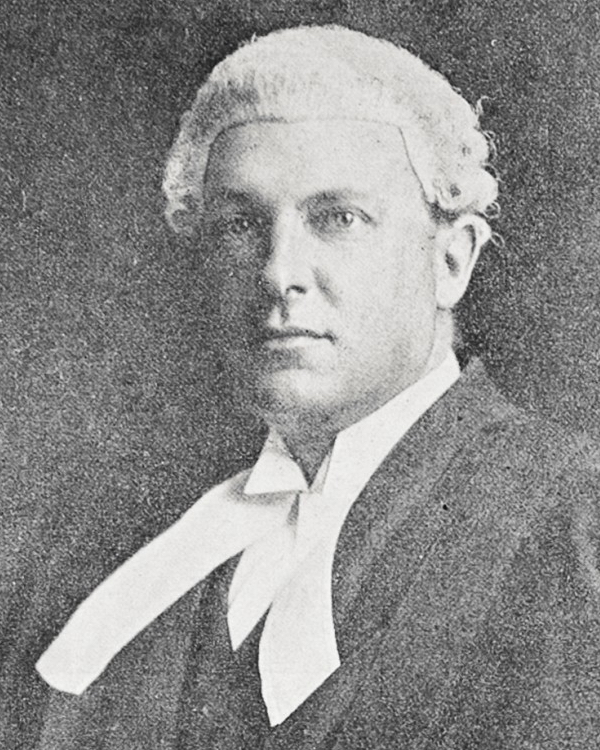
Sir Francis Frazer

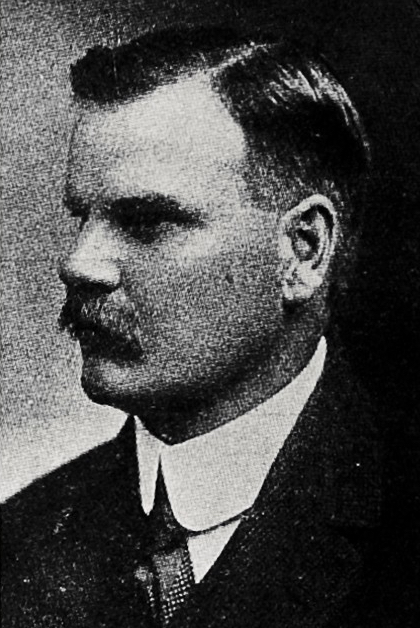
Sir Henry Horton

== Order of the Bath ==
=== Companion (CB) ===
Military division, additional

- Colonel Frank Symon CMG DSO ADC – of Wellington; Director of Artillery, Royal New Zealand Artillery.
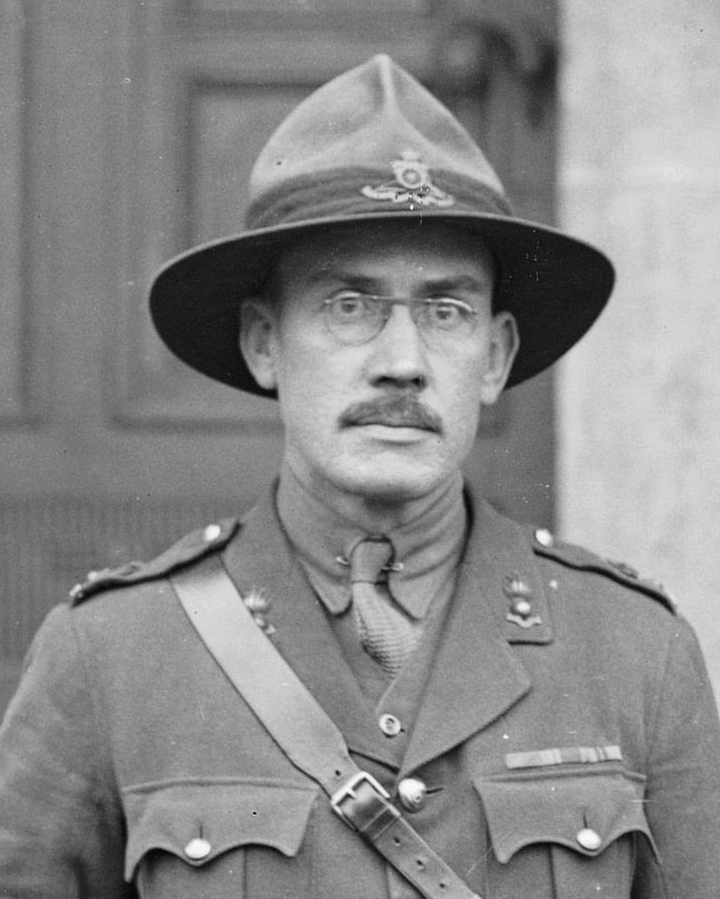
Frank Symon

== Order of Saint Michael and Saint George ==
=== Knight Grand Cross (GCMG) ===
Additional

- The Honourable Sir Christopher James Parr KCMG – High Commissioner for New Zealand in London.
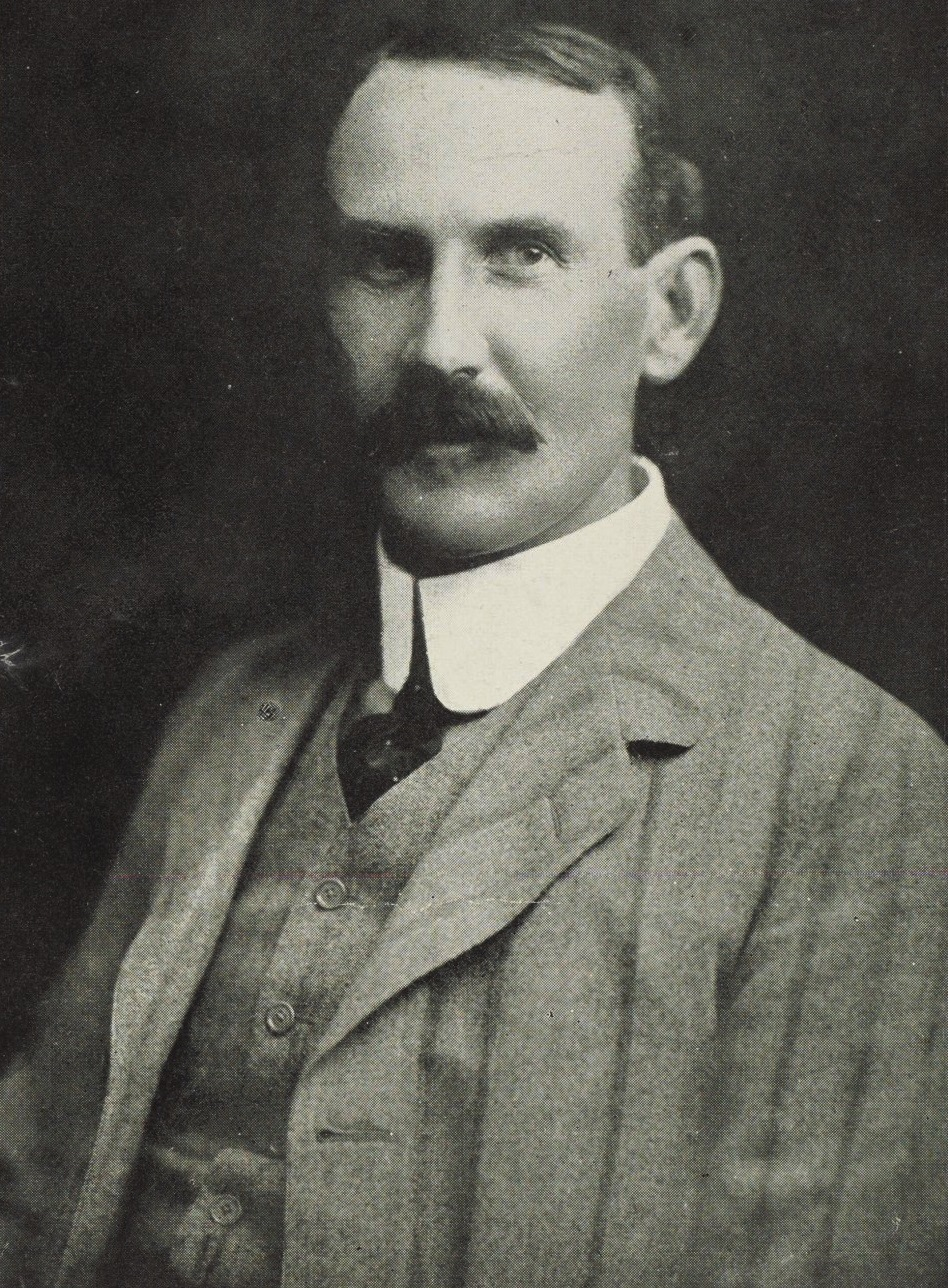
Sir James Parr

=== Knight Commander (KCMG) ===
Additional

- The Honourable Ethelbert Alfred Ransom – Minister of Lands.
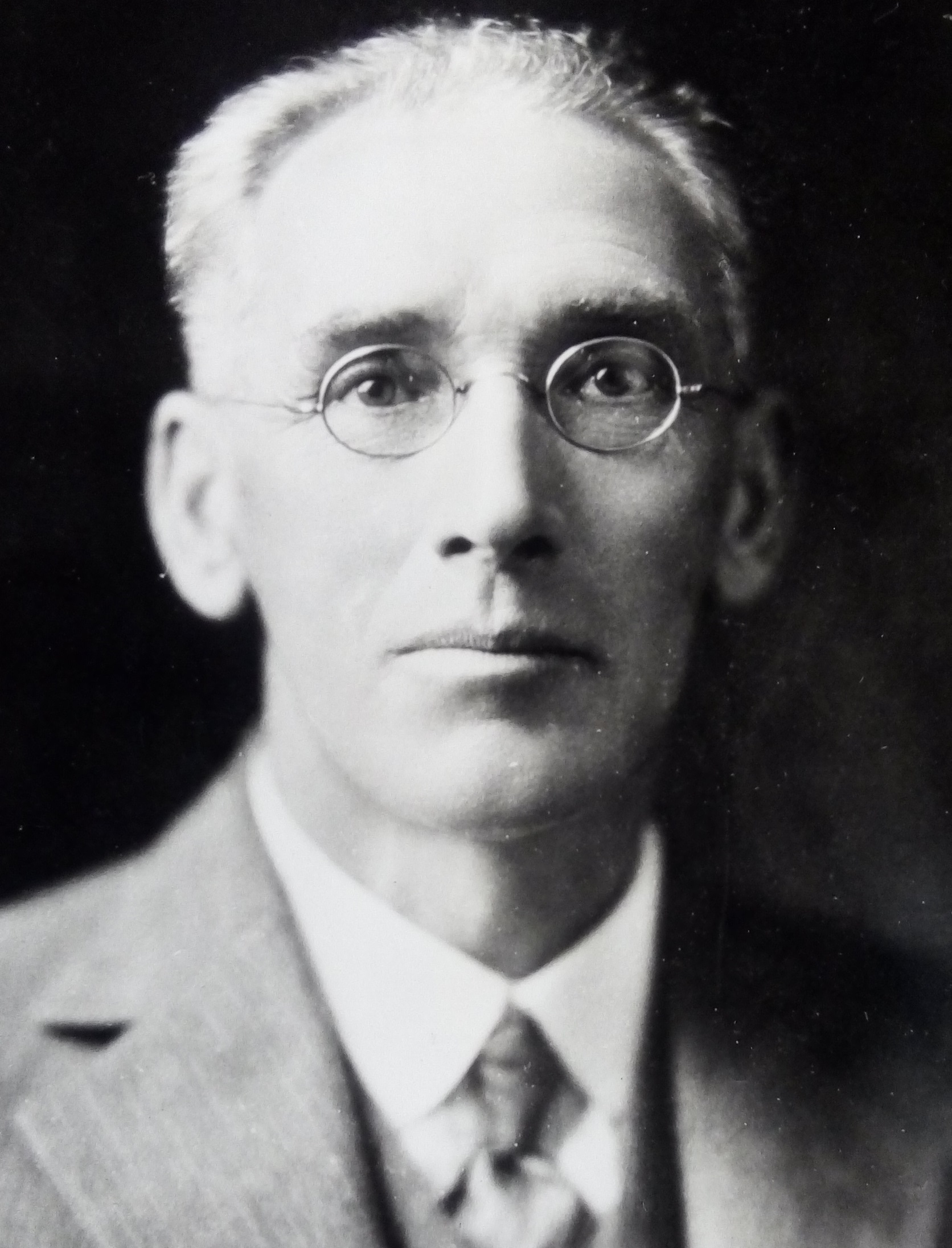
Sir Alfred Ransom

=== Companion (CMG) ===
Additional

- Professor John Rawson Elder MA DLitt – of Dunedin; professor of history at the University of Otago.
- Thomas Charles Atkinson Hislop – mayor of Wellington.
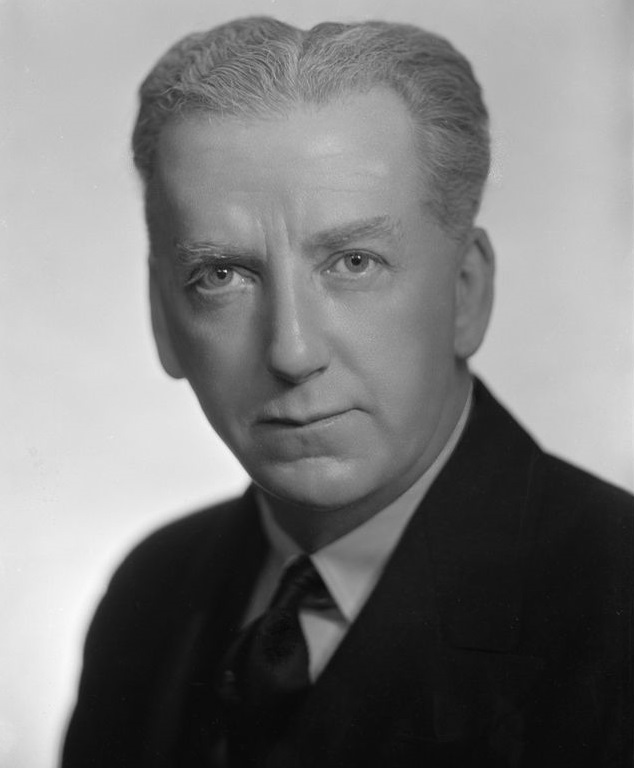
Thomas Hislop

== Order of the British Empire ==
=== Knight Commander (KBE) ===
Civil division, additional

- Brigadier-General Herbert Ernest Hart CB CMG DSO VD – administrator of Western Samoa.

Military division, additional

- Major-General Sir William Livingstone Hatchwell Sinclair-Burgess CB CMG DSO – New Zealand Staff Corps, General Officer Commanding and Chief of the General Staff, New Zealand Military Forces.
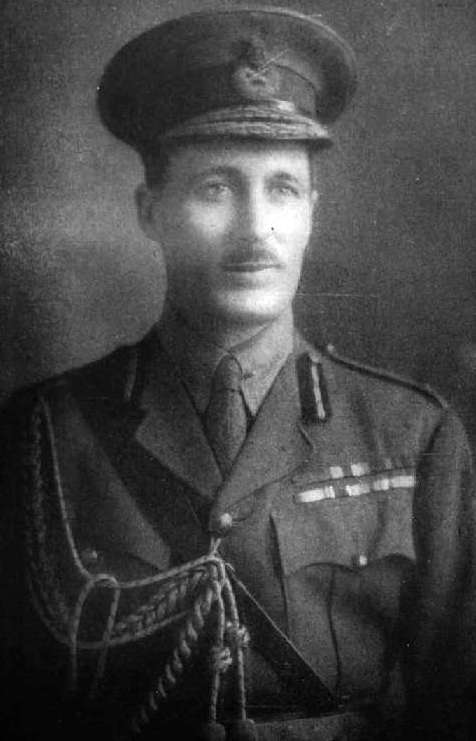
Sir Herbert Hart

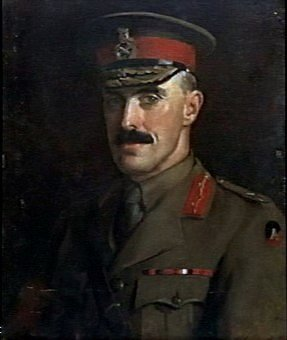
Sir William Sinclair-Burgess

=== Commander (CBE) ===
Civil division, additional

- Ernest Marsden MC DSO – secretary, Department of Scientific and Industrial Research.
- Michael Herbert Watt MD – Director-General of Health.

Military division, additional

- Colonel William Henry Cunningham DSO VD – of Wellington; commander, 2nd New Zealand Infantry Brigade.
- Colonel Herbert Clarence Hurst DSO VD – of Christchurch; commander, 3rd New Zealand Mounted Rifles Brigade.
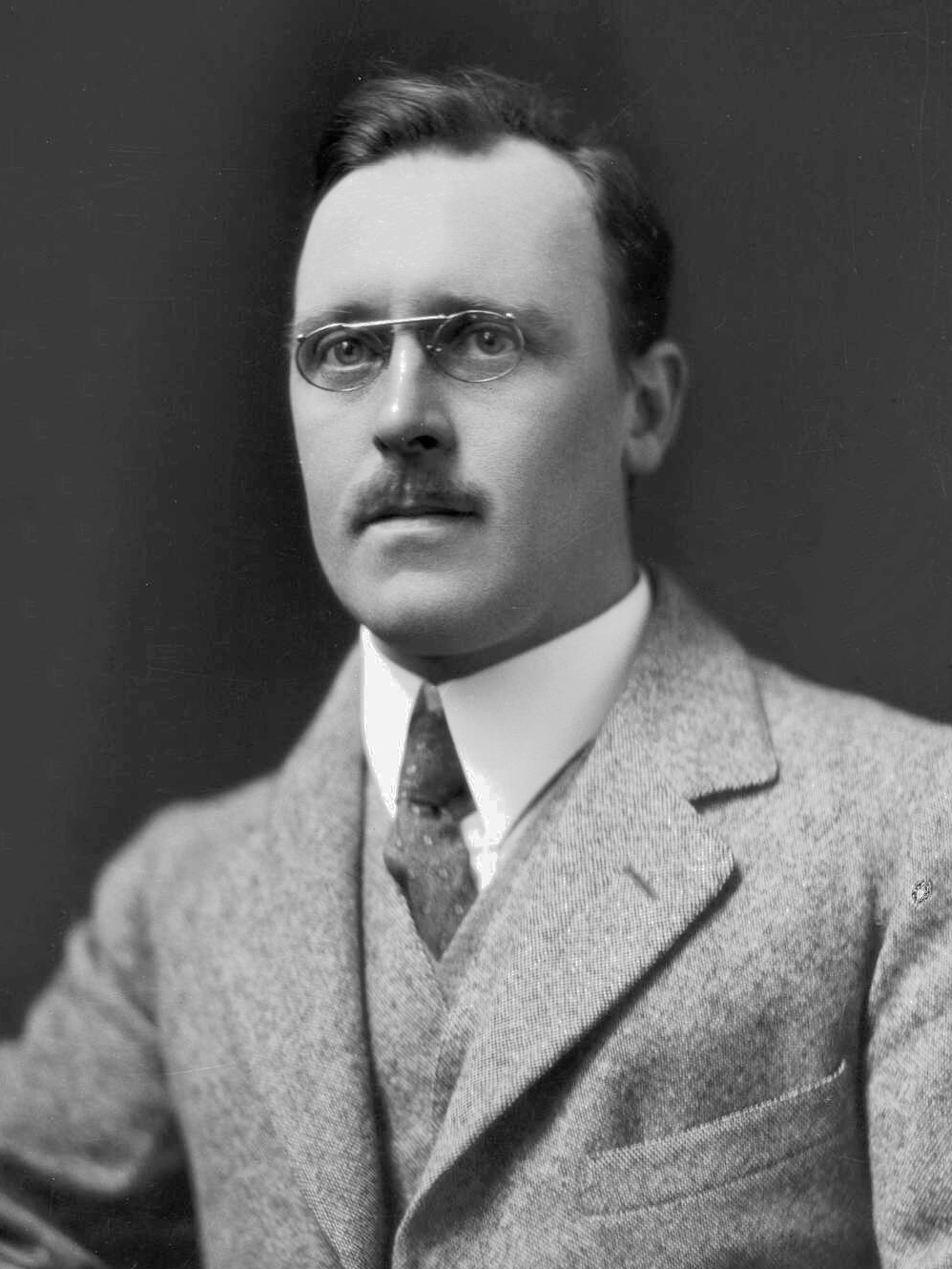
Ernest Marsden

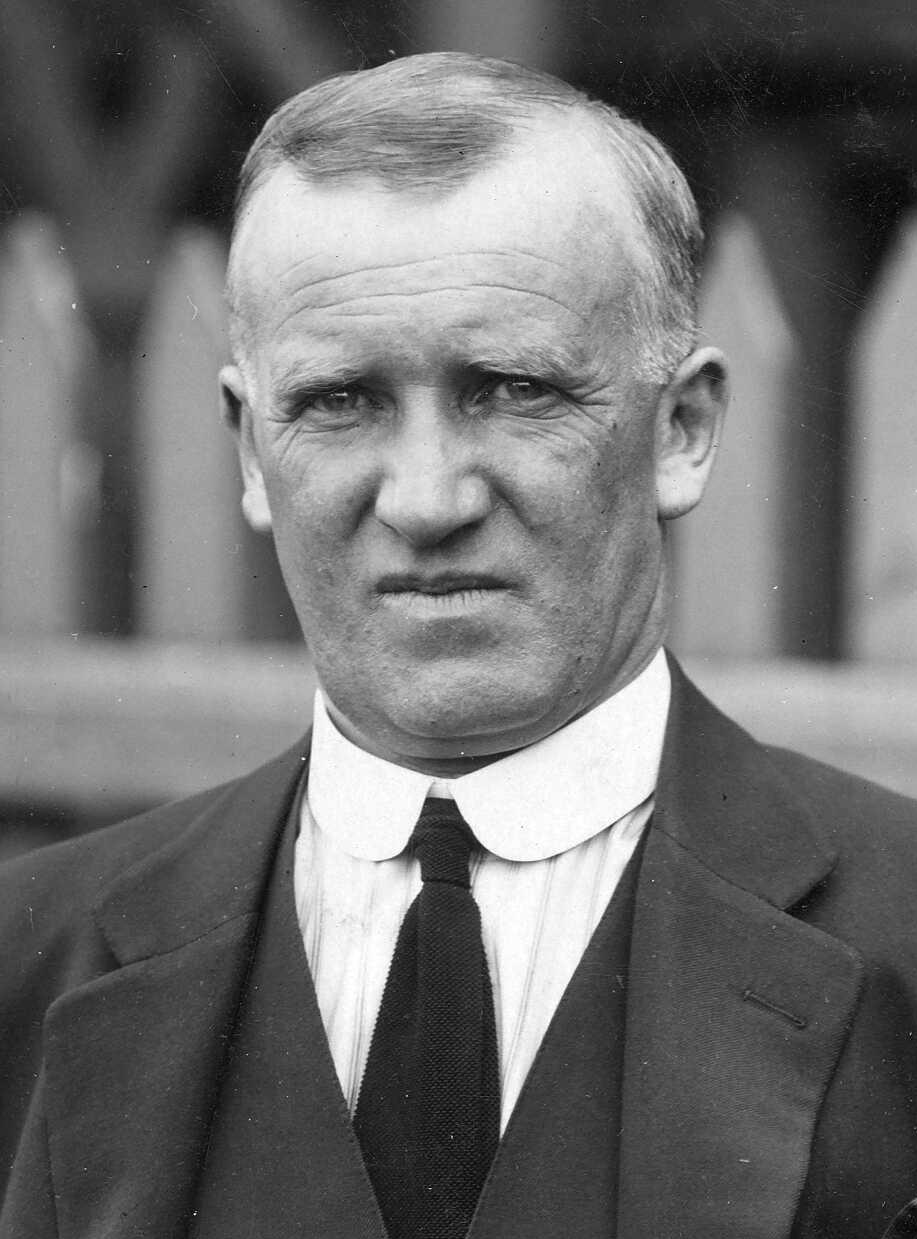
Michael Watt

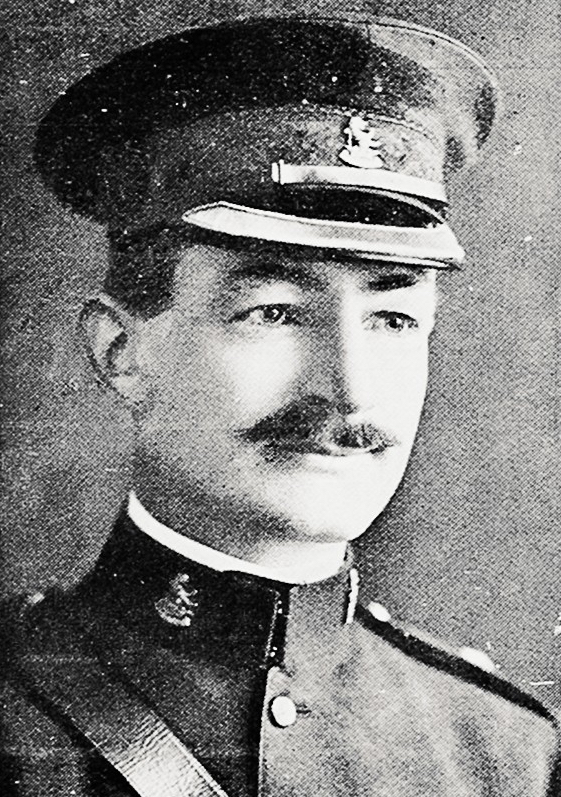
William Cunningham

=== Officer (OBE) ===
Civil division, additional

- John William Collins – trade and tourist commissioner in Canada and the United States of America.
- Charles Frederick Goldie – of Auckland. For services to art.
- Lucinda Henrietta Wilson – of Auckland. For public and philanthropic services.

Civil division, honorary

- Makea Karika Takau – a leading female ariki of the Cook Islands.
- Mata'afa Salanoa Muliufi – a leading chief of Western Samoa.

Military division, additional

- Lieutenant-Colonel William Robert Lang MC VD – of Waipu; officer commanding, North Auckland Mounted Rifles.
- Lieutenant-Colonel Robert Gracie Milligan DSO VD – of Auckland; officer commanding 1st Field Brigade, New Zealand Artillery.
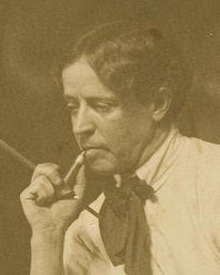
C. F. Goldie

=== Member (MBE) ===
Civil division, additional

- Johannes Carl Andersen – of Wellington; librarian, Alexander Turnbull Library.
- Arthur Kingsley Bell – of Wellington. For services in connection with the Legion of Frontiersmen.
- Walter Bromley – deputy chairman, Unemployment Board.
- The Reverend Jasper Cyril Austin Calder – of Auckland. For charitable and philanthropic services.
- Mary Hobhouse Chatfield – of Wellington. For social-welfare and philanthropic services.
- Annie Isabel Fraer – of Christchurch. For public services.
- Dr Doris Clifton Gordon MB – of Stratford. For services in connection with maternal and child welfare.
- Edith Annie Howes – of Dunedin. For public services.
- William Alfred James – New Zealand government agent at Vancouver.
- Marianne Caughey Preston – of Auckland. For philanthropic services.

Military division, additional

- Flight-Lieutenant Maurice William Buckley – of Christchurch; Royal New Zealand Air Force.
- Captain George Dittmer MC – of Auckland; New Zealand Staff Corps.
- Captain Peter William Gordon Spiers MC VD – of Dunedin; Otago Regiment, New Zealand Military Forces.
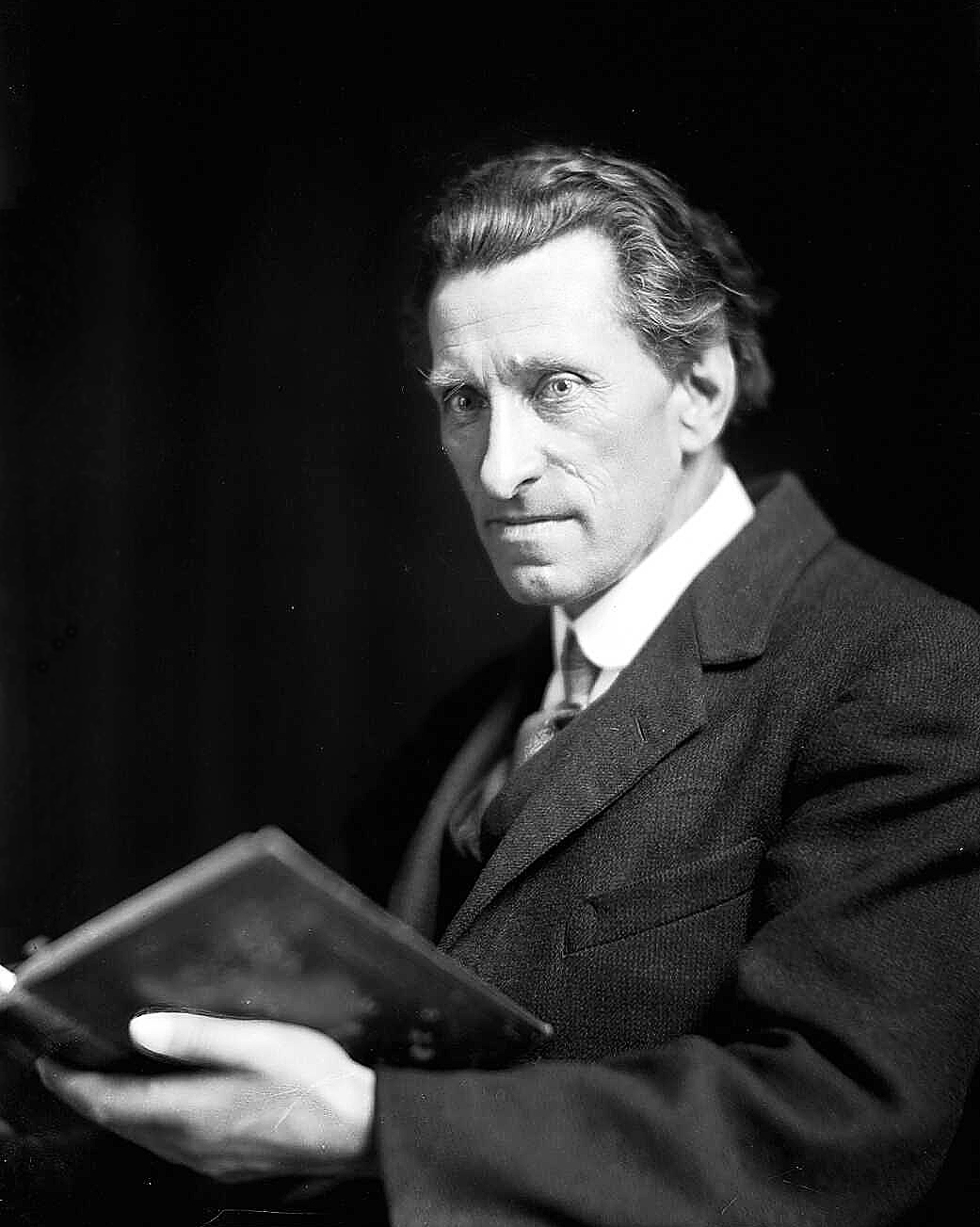
Johannes Andersen

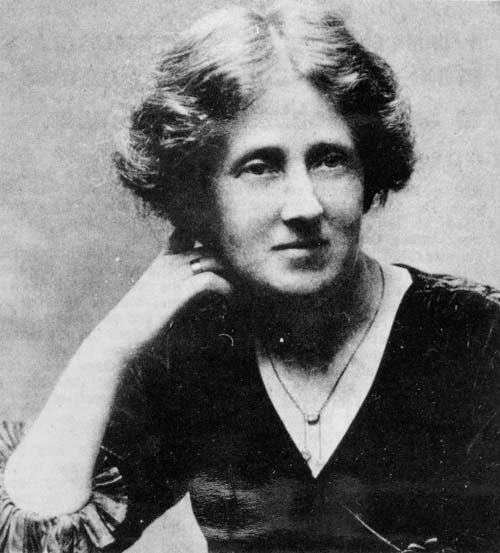
Edith Howes

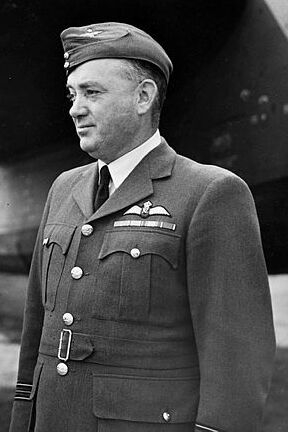
Maurice Buckley

== Companion of the Imperial Service Order (ISO) ==
- Alfred Ernest Allison – lately Government Insurance commissioner.
- Dr George Craig CMG LLD – lately comptroller of Customs.
