= Annie Fraer =

New Zealand community leader (1868–1939)

Annie Isabel Fraer MBE (née McLean, 21 September 1868 – 8 March 1939) was a New Zealand community leader. She was born in Andersons Bay, Dunedin, New Zealand, on 21 September 1868.

From 1929 to 1933 she was a member of the Christchurch City Council.

In 1935, she was awarded the King George V Silver Jubilee Medal. Later that year, she was appointed a Member of the Order of the British Empire, for public services, in the 1935 King's Birthday and Silver Jubilee Honours.
