= E. H. Hiley =

Ernest Haviland Hiley (11 June 1870 – March 1943) was the General Manager of New Zealand Railways from 1913 to 1919. He was born in Richmond, then part of Surrey, England, and returned to England after his retirement in 1919.

He saw the Canadian Pacific system en route to New Zealand.

He served in the NZEF as a Lieutenant-Colonel in a Railway Operating Company, so during World War I his successor Richard McVilly was acting General Manager.

He established the "Hiley Cup" for miniature rifle shooting by teams from Head Office departments.

He resigned on 30 April 1919 (wishing to return to England), being replaced by Richard McVilly.

In 1928 he served on the Royal Commission on London Government.

He was awarded a KBE and CBE.

He died in Marylebone, London aged 72. He had also advised the Indian, Mexican and Rhodesian Governments, and since 1932 he had been chairman of the English Traffic Commissioners.
