= Arthur Hume =

- Born: Dublin, Ireland
- Died: Wellington, New Zealand
- Spouse: Rebecca Charlotte Jenkins Macintire
- Children: 7

Arthur Hume (c.1838 – 2 February 1918) was an Irish-born British military officer and New Zealand civil servant. He served in the Cameron Highlanders in India. After serving briefly in Millbank, Dartmoor, Portland and Wormwood Scrubs prisons, he was appointed the first New Zealand Inspector-General of prisons starting in 1880 and was later simultaneously Commissioner of Police. From June 1888 Hume was inspector of volunteers in the New Zealand Militia.

Police appointments
Preceded by Walter Edward Gudgeon	Commissioner of Police of New Zealand; 1890–1897	Succeeded by John Bennett Tunbridge
