= Walter Dinnie =

New Zealand police commissioner, private detective and land board chairman

Walter Dinnie (26 December 1850 – 7 May 1923) was a British and New Zealand police officer, private detective and land board chairman.

== Life ==
Brother of the strongman Donald Dinnie, he was born in Aboyne to Robert and Celia Dinnie (née Hay). His father worked as a contractor but was also a poet and local historian in his spare time. After Aberdeen Grammar School and time as a bank clerk, in 1873 he became a clerk for the West Riding of Yorkshire Constabulary before three years later becoming an officer in the Metropolitan Police in London.

In the latter he moved from clerical to detective work, specialising in forgeries and fraud, such as extraditing Charles Wells in late 1892 and the 'Harry the Valet' case of 1898, the latter alongside Frank Froest and Walter Dew. After retirement from that force he was appointed Police Commissioner of New Zealand. In 1901 he collaborated with Edward Henry to set up the Met's Fingerprint Department before two years later being headhunted by government of New Zealand to head their police force.

In the meantime, on 18 October 1883, he had married Frederica Matilda Kemp at Croydon. He left the Met on 6 April 1903 and landed at Wellington with his wife and their five children on 8 June, from which his predecessor John Bennett Tunbridge took him on an inspection tour. Dinnie imported not only the Met's fingerprint classification system (New Zealand's head of fingerprints from 1904 was Walter's son Edmund) but also opened a New Zealand police museum, probably influenced by the Met's Crime Museum.

Confidence in Dinnie had dropped by 1907 and reached a low point in 1909, leading him to request a Royal Commission, which painted the force as "thoroughly efficient" but him as incompetent. He fought back in the press but ultimately the prime minister announced Dinnie's resignation on 22 December 1909. He remained in the country as president of the Tokerau District Māori Land Board, based in Auckland, in a role that lasted until 1914, when he moved into private detection. He declined an offer to be Assistant Commissioner of Police in Samoa in 1916. He died in Wellington in 1923 aged 72.

Police appointments
Preceded by John Bennett Tunbridge	Commissioner of Police of New Zealand; 1903–1909	Succeeded by Frank Waldegrave (acting)
