= John Bennett Tunbridge =

New Zealand local politician and police officer

John Bennett Tunbridge (17 November 1850 – 6 October 1928) was a notable British police officer who became the fourth Commissioner of Police for New Zealand. He also served in New Zealand as a local body politician.

He was born in New Romney, Kent, England, in 1850. He initially served in the Metropolitan Police in London in 1867-1868 and 1869–1895, rising to Chief Inspector in that force's central CID and frequently pursuing cases around the British Empire and Dominions.

While New Zealand premier Richard Seddon was in London for the Diamond Jubilee of Queen Victoria, Tunbridge was recommended to him by Met Commissioner Sir Edward Bradford to head the New Zealand Police, the first professional police officer to do so (the first three had been former army officers).

Police appointments
Preceded by Arthur Hume	Commissioner of Police of New Zealand; 1897–1903	Succeeded by Walter Dinnie
