= James Cummings (police officer) =

New Zealand police officer and commissioner (1878–1976)

James Cummings CBE (12 July 1878 – 24 September 1976) was a New Zealand police officer and police commissioner. He was born in Tuapeka Flat, South Otago, New Zealand. He was the brother of Denis Joseph Cummings.

In the 1950 New Year Honours, Cummings was appointed a Commander of the Order of the British Empire.

Police appointments
Preceded by Denis Joseph Cummings	Commissioner of Police of New Zealand; 1944–1950	Succeeded by Bruce Young
