= Thomas Broberg =

Swedish engineer

Thomas Broberg is a senior engineer for Volvo in Gothenburg, Sweden, who is active in automobile safety. He also worked for Ford Motor Company.

He was featured in ITV's Police Camera Action! on the episode "Highway of Tomorrow" in 2000.
