= Ralph Broberg =

English cricketer

Personal information
- Full name: Ralph Francis Broberg
- Born: 21 July 1899; Birmingham, Warwickshire, England
- Died: 3 September 1938 (aged 39); Hall Green, Worcestershire, England
- Batting: Unknown
- Bowling: Slow left-arm orthodox

Domestic team information
- Years: Team
- 1920: Warwickshire

Career statistics
Competition	First-class
Matches	1
Runs scored	4
Batting average	4.00
100s/50s	–/–
Top score	4
Balls bowled	30
Wickets	–
Bowling average	–
5 wickets in innings	–
10 wickets in match	–
Best bowling	–
Catches/stumpings	–/–
- Source: Cricinfo, 17 May 2012

Ralph Francis Broberg (21 July 1899 – 3 September 1938) was an English cricketer. Broberg's batting style is unknown, but it is known he bowled slow left-arm orthodox. He was born at Birmingham, Warwickshire.

Broberg made a single first-class appearance for Warwickshire against Somerset at Edgbaston in the 1920 County Championship. Warwickshire won the toss and elected to bat, making 220 all out, with Broberg being dismissed for 4 runs by Philip Foy. In response, Somerset made 231 all out, during which he bowled five wicketless overs for the cost of 16 runs. Warwickshire reached 98/6 in their second-innings, at which point the match was declared a draw. This was his only major appearance for Warwickshire.

He died at Hall Green, Worcestershire, on 3 September 1938.
