= Charles Robert Broberg =

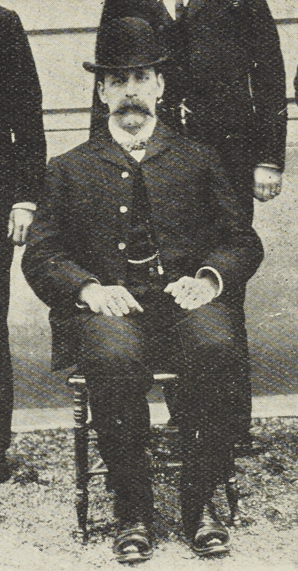
Broberg in 1903

Charles Robert Broberg MVO (22 May 1870 – 20 November 1937) was a New Zealand policeman. He was born in Auckland, New Zealand, on 22 May 1870.

In July 1927, to mark the visit of the Duke and Duchess of York to New Zealand, Broberg was appointed a Member of the Royal Victorian Order.
