= Commissioner of Police (New Zealand) =

Head of the New Zealand Police

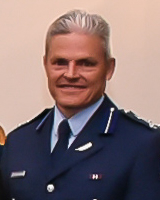
- Incumbent; Richard Chambers since 25 November 2024
- Reports to: Minister of Police
- Appointer: Governor General on the advice of the prime minister
- Term length: No longer than 5 years
- Inaugural holder: George Stoddart Whitmore
- Deputy: Tania Kura & Chris De Wattigner
- Salary: NZ$670,000
- Website: https://www.police.govt.nz/about-us/structure/commissioner-and-executive

The commissioner of police is the head of the New Zealand Police and the position is currently held by Richard Chambers. The commissioner is appointed for a term not exceeding five years by the governor-general, and reports to the minister of police. The position combines two functions, that of chief constable in charge of policing and cases, and chief executive responsible for assets and budgeting. The rank insignia is a sword and a baton crossed over each other with a St Edward's Crown above. In military terms, the rank is equivalent to lieutenant general.

== History ==
The Police Force Act 1886 split the police from the earlier body known as the New Zealand Armed Constabulary, which had performed both civil policing functions as well as being the standing army and militia, on 1 September 1886. Sir George Whitmore was appointed as the first commissioner, reporting to the Minister of Defence. Early commissioners came from the United Kingdom with military or law enforcement experience, such as Walter Dinnie, who had served as an Inspector at Scotland Yard.

On 20 November 2024, Police Minister Mark Mitchell announced that Richard Chambers would be appointed as the new commissioner of police. Commissioner Chambers took over the position on 25 November 2024, replacing Andrew Coster who had left the role on 11 November 2024. New Zealand Police Association president Chris Cahill has said Richard Chambers was a “popular choice” among police staff.

Between the resignation of Andrew Coster on the 11 November 2024 and the appointment of Richard Chambers on the 25 November 2024 the first ever female commissioner of police, Tania Kura, was appointed for an interim term of 14 days.

According to the Public Service Commission, from 2021 to 2024 then commissioner of police, Andrew Coster, received a yearly salary of $670,000, making him tied for the sixth-highest pay among public sector leaders.

== List of commissioners ==
#	Image	Name	Term of office		Notes
#	Image	Name	Start	End	Notes
1		Sir George Stoddart Whitmore	1 September 1886	31 December 1886	
2		Major Walter E. Gudgeon	5 January 1887	June 1890	
3		Lt. Col. Arthur Hume	1 July 1890	1897	
4		John Bennett Tunbridge	21 October 1897	1903	
5		Walter Dinnie	June 1903	22 December 1909	
6		Frank Waldegrave (acting, undersecretary of Justice)	December 1909	1912	
7		John Cullen	19 April 1912	23 November 1916	
8		John O'Donovan	December 1916	1921	
9		Arthur Wright	1 January 1922	31 January 1926	
10		William McIlveney (first New Zealand born)	1 February 1926	30 June 1930	
11		Ward Wohlmann	1 August 1930	30 June 1936	
12		Denis Joseph Cummings	1 July 1936	31 October 1944	
13		James Cummings	1 November 1944	15 April 1950	
14		Bruce Young (died in office)	4 April 1950	28 December 1952	
15		Eric Compton	11 March 1953	18 April 1955	
16		Samuel Barnett (Controller General)	16 May 1955	1958	
17		Willis Spencer Brown	1 December 1958	1961	
18		Leslie Spencer	1961	May 1967	
19		Colin Urquhart	May 1967	≥ 1969	
20		Sir Angus Sharp	<= 1970	1974	
21		Ken Burnside	October 1974	mid 1978	
22		Bob Walton	mid 1978	4 November 1983	
23		Ken Thompson	5 November 1983	January 1987	
24		Malcolm Churches	January 1987	April 1989	
25		John Jamieson	April 1989	? 1993	
26		Richard Macdonald	1994	1996	
27		Peter Doone	1 July 1996	25 January 2000	
28		Rob Robinson	2000	18 December 2005	
29		Steve Long (acting)	December 2005	4 April 2006	
30		Howard Broad	4 April 2006	3 April 2011	
31		Peter Marshall	4 April 2011	2 April 2014	
32		Mike Bush	3 April 2014	2 April 2020	
33		Andrew Coster	3 April 2020	10 November 2024	
34		Tania Kura (interim)	11 November 2024	24 November 2024	
35		Richard Chambers	25 November 2024	Incumbent	
