= 3rd Field Ambulance (Australia) =

The 3rd Australian Field Ambulance was a company of the 3rd Brigade, 1st Division in the Australian Imperial Force (AIF) during the First World War. The 3rd Field Ambulance was deployed to Gallipoli, Turkey, on 25 April 1915. It is primarily known for being the company John Simpson Kirkpatrick was registered in. The Field Ambulance consisted of medical personnel who would treat injured soldiers on the battlefield.

Private John Kirkpatrick Simpson was born on 6 July 1892, in South Shields of North East England, and at age 23 he enlisted as a stretcher bearer with the 3rd Field Ambulance during the Gallipoli campaign. John Simpson became Australia's most famous military hero for his innovative idea of using a donkey to assist in carrying wounded soldiers from the high ground of the front line, back to the dressing stations located at Anzac Cove. For part of its service on the Western Front, it was commanded by Lieutenant Colonel Arthur Butler, who later wrote the official history of the Australian Army's medical services during the war.

During the Second World War, the 3rd Field Ambulance was part of the Militia, Australia's part-time military force, and was deployed to New Guinea, where it supported the 30th Brigade during fighting against the Japanese during the Kokoda Track campaign, deploying from Adelaide in January 1942.
