= Anzac of the Year Award =

The Anzac of the Year Award is awarded each year by the Royal New Zealand Returned and Services' Association (RSA) to New Zealanders who demonstrate the spirit of the Anzac soldiers; people who serve others in a "positive, selfless and compassionate manner" and who demonstrate the qualities of comradeship, compassion, courage and commitment.

The Award was established in 2010, and in 2014 received the patronage of the Governor-General of New Zealand. Members of the public may submit nominations to a Selection Panel, which makes the final choice of recipient. The Selection Panel comprises three New Zealanders from the defence forces and the RSA, and the incumbent Governor-General.

== The Award statuette ==
The bronze statuette was designed by Captain Matt Gauldie of the New Zealand Army. It depicts two soldiers with a donkey, and represents the story of New Zealander Private Richard Henderson. During the battle for Gallipoli, the 19-year old Henderson was a stretcher bearer. He used a donkey to convey wounded soldiers from the battlefields to medical stations, at considerable personal risk.

The base of the statuette shows the Maori hammerhead shark motif, signifying Tumatauenga, the God of War.

== Recipients ==
=== 2016 ===
Barbara Cunningham of Mataura, Southland, received the 2016 Award for her work establishing a community garden to help people who could not afford to buy vegetables. The community garden also took over the town's Meals on Wheels service for elderly people and extended the service to any needy people in the town, providing fresh, locally made meals.

=== 2015 ===
Louise Nicholas, rape survivor and advocate for victims' rights, received the 2015 Award. She had been nominated by the Katherine Mansfield Birthplace Association for her courage in demanding accountability over her allegations of rape by New Zealand Police officers despite significant opposition and scrutiny.

=== 2014 ===
Banapa Avatea was the recipient of the 2014 Award. Avatea prevented a potentially fatal accident on State Highway 1 between Auckland and Hamilton; he noticed a truck was being driven erratically and followed it, eventually gaining an opportunity to board the vehicle and bring it under control. The driver had passed out at the wheel. The award was presented by the Governor General Sir Jerry Mateparae at a ceremony at Government House, Wellington.

=== 2013 ===
12-year old cousins Will White and Sergio Schuler received the 2013 Award for their bravery in rescuing a swimmer caught in a rip at a beach in Waihi. The boys used their surf lifesaver training to call for help, then swim out to support the swimmer, bring him back to the shore and stay with him until emergency services arrived. The Governor-General Sir Jerry Mateparae presented the award at a ceremony at the Waihi Beach Memorial RSA.

=== 2012 ===
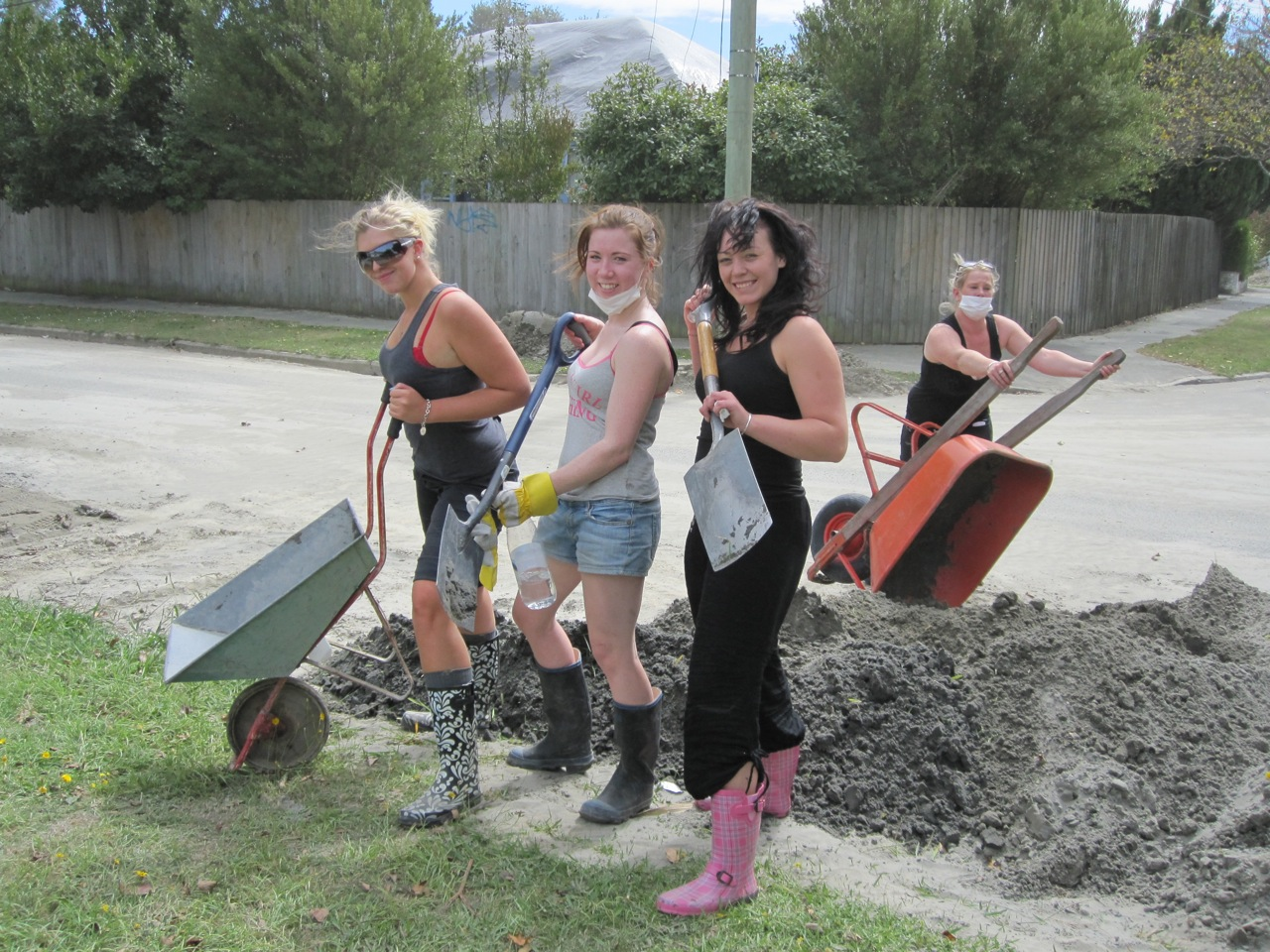
A Student Volunteer Army team clearing liquefaction in Christchurch

The Student Volunteer Army received the 2012 Award in recognition of its contribution to the recovery of Christchurch following the devastating 2010 and 2011 Christchurch earthquake. Governor-General Sir Jerry Mateparae presented the award in a ceremony at the University of Canterbury.

=== 2011 ===
Brigadier (Retired) Dr Brian McMahon was selected to receive the 2011 Award. At the time of the award, McMahon had served New Zealand for 60 years as a soldier and as a doctor in military hospitals and facilities in New Zealand, Malaysia, Vietnam and Singapore. Governor-General Sir Anand Satyanand presented the award at a ceremony at Government House, Wellington.

=== 2010 ===
Lieutenant Colonel John Masters was the inaugural recipient of the Award. Masters had served in the New Zealand Army for 27 years, seeing active service in Malaysia, Borneo and Vietnam, and he had also received the Military Cross for bravery in rescuing a Ghurka soldier. On his return to New Zealand, Masters became an advocate for veterans, including playing a key role in demonstrating the impact of Agent Orange on New Zealand soldiers.

Prime Minister John Key presented the award to Masters' wife Alisoun and son Allan as Masters was not able to travel due to ill health. Chief of Defence Jerry Mateparae later presented the award personally to Masters in Christchurch.
