= Beach Commonwealth War Graves Commission Cemetery =

WWI Gallipoli Campaign cemetery

Coordinates: 40°13′59″N 26°16′35″E

Beach
- Commonwealth War Graves Commission
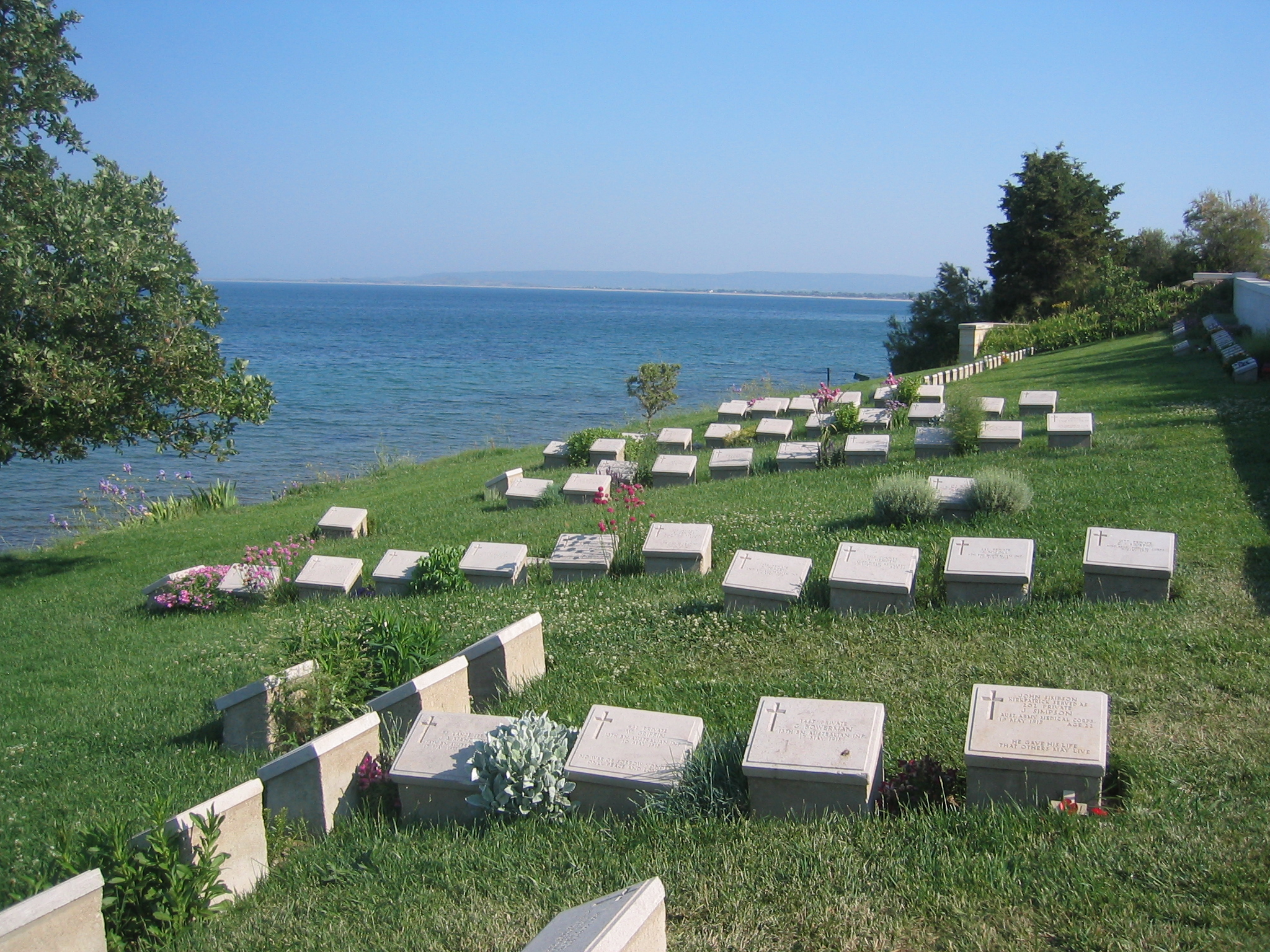
- Beach Cemetery. John Simpson Kirkpatrick's headstone is on the right in the foreground
- Used for those deceased August–December 1915
- Established: 1915
- Total burials: 391

Burials by nation
- Allied Powers: Unknowns: 21; Australia: 285; United Kingdom: 50; New Zealand: 21; Ceylon : 3

Burials by war
- World War I: 391

Beach Cemetery is a small Commonwealth War Graves Commission cemetery containing the remains of allied troops who died during the Battle of Gallipoli. It is located at Hell Spit, at the southern end of Anzac Cove on the Gallipoli Peninsula.

The first graves were dug on the day of the landing 25 April 1915 and it continued to be used almost until the evacuation of the Anzac area on 20 December.

The majority of the graves, 285, are from the Australian Imperial Force, including that of Private John Simpson Kirkpatrick and three New Zealanders. It also contains 21 troops from the New Zealand army, 49 British personnel and three from the 80-strong Ceylon Tea Planters’ contingent. The tea planters were used as the Anzac commander, General William Birdwood's bodyguard. There are also 21 graves whose occupants are unknown.

== Other notable graves ==
Apart from Kirkpatrick, other notable graves include those of:

- Royal Navy Commander Edward Cater, of HMS Lord Nelson, in charge of the landings site and who was killed by shell fire on 7 August. He was a familiar figure to the troops in the Anzac sector, particularly recognisable because he wore a monacle.
- Colonel Lancelot Clarke of the 12 Battalion Australian Expeditionary Force who was killed on the day of the landing after leading the assault up the Sphinx. At 57, he was probably the oldest Australian soldier to be killed in the campaign.

The cemetery was designed in the 1920s by Sir John Burnet, and was registered as a cultural heritage site by the Turkish Ministry of Culture on 14 November 1980.
