= Clint Rickards =

New Zealand police officer

Clint Rickards (born January 20, 1961) is a former high-ranking New Zealand police officer who in the 2000s was accused of involvement in a number of sexual crimes in the 1980s. These involved multiple police officers having sex with teenage girls. Rickards was brought to trial in two cases, one for the alleged rape of Louise Nicholas and another for allegedly kidnapping and indecently assaulting a then 16-year-old girl. He was acquitted in both trials in March 2006. Although he and co-accused, former policemen Brad Shipton and Bob Schollum, were acquitted, the juries in both trials were not allowed to hear of the previous convictions of Schollum and Shipton or that they were both currently serving sentences for a pack rape that involved the use of a baton on a young woman in Mt Maunganui in 1989.

From 2004 to 2007 Rickards was suspended on full pay. He held the rank of Assistant Commissioner, but resigned from the police on 22 November 2007, one day before the official inquiry into his misconduct was scheduled to begin. The police paid out his contract to the equivalent of 13 months' salary (NZ$300,000) in a deal leading to the resignation.

In 2008, Rickards completed a law degree, which he had been studying for during his suspension. He was admitted to the bar in November 2008. He was reported to be considering taking Louise Nicholas to court for what he considers perjury during the rape trial.

== See also ==
- New Zealand Police#Historical sexual misconduct by police
- Louise Nicholas
