= Richard Alexander Henderson =

New Zealand soldier (1895–1958)

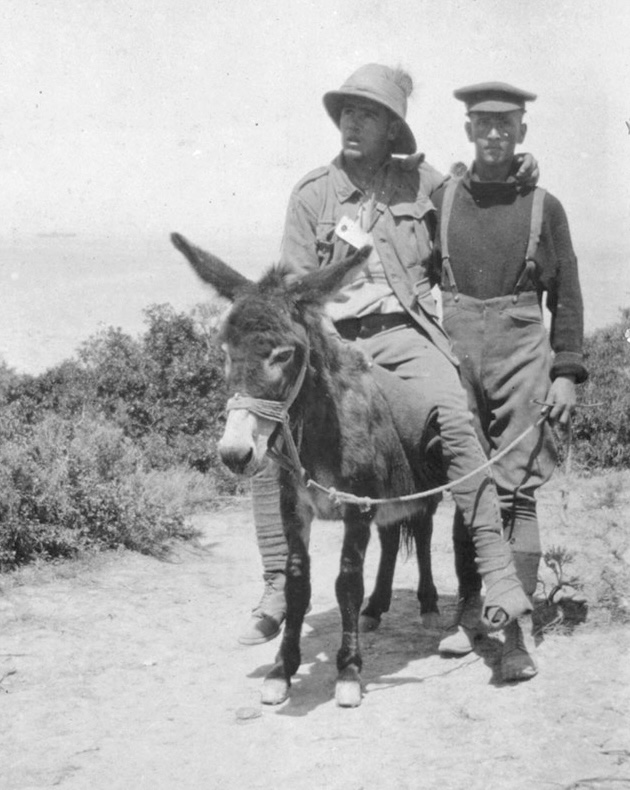
- Pte. Richard Alexander "Dick" Henderson using a donkey to carry a wounded soldier at the Battle of Gallipoli; photograph taken 12 May 1915 by Sergeant James Gardiner Jackson
- Born: 26 August 1895; Waihi, New Zealand
- Died: 14 November 1958 (aged 63); Auckland, New Zealand
- Military career
- Allegiance: New Zealand
- Branch: New Zealand Military Forces
- Rank: Corporal
- Nickname: Dick
- Service number: 3/258
- Unit: New Zealand Medical Corps
- Conflicts: First World War; Battle of Gallipoli; Battle of the Somme; Battle of Passchendaele
- Awards: Military Medal
- Other work: school-teacher

Private Richard Alexander Henderson MM (26 August 1895 – 14 November 1958) was a school-teacher who served with the New Zealand Medical Corps at the Battle of Gallipoli. Like John Simpson Kirkpatrick, he used a donkey to carry wounded soldiers from the battlefield. He was later honoured with a Military Medal for repeatedly rescuing wounded from the battlefield while under heavy fire at the Battle of the Somme.

== Early life ==
Henderson was born on 26 August 1895 at Waihi in the North Island of New Zealand. He was a trainee teacher in Auckland until the outbreak of the First World War. On 10 August 1914, he enlisted with the New Zealand Expeditionary Force (NZEF) as a stretcher-bearer in the New Zealand Medical Corps.

== First World War ==
Henderson embarked for the Middle East with the main body of the NZEF in October 1914. Soon after the ANZAC landings at Gallipoli he saw John Simpson Kirkpatrick using a donkey to carry wounded soldiers, and began to do the same. While it is reported that he began this work after Kirkpatrick's death on 19 May 1915, he was photographed with a donkey carrying a wounded man on 12 May 1915 by Sergeant James Gardiner Jackson. According to Henderson's own account, he continued the work for about six weeks after Kirkpatrick's death.

Henderson later served in France, and on 22 October 1916 was awarded the recently created Military Medal for bravery in battle on land, with the citation "During operations on the Somme on 15th September he went out repeatedly under heavy shellfire and brought in wounded who were exposed to it. He set a fine example to other bearers". Henderson was promoted to lance corporal and then, on 23 March 1917, to corporal.

After a period of service at a NZEF hospital in England, Henderson was very badly gassed at Passchendaele on 12 October 1917 and evacuated to England where he was found to be dangerously ill, was declared unfit for military service and was repatriated. He sailed from Liverpool on 2 February 1918 and was discharged from the NZEF for medical reasons on 21 May 1918. He was awarded the 1914-15 Star, the British War Medal and the Victory Medal.

== Later life ==
Henderson did not recover from the effects of the gas. He went back to teaching, but became blind in 1934 and was obliged to stop working. He remained in poor health for the rest of his life, and died in Green Lane Hospital, Auckland, on 14 November 1958.

== Legacy ==
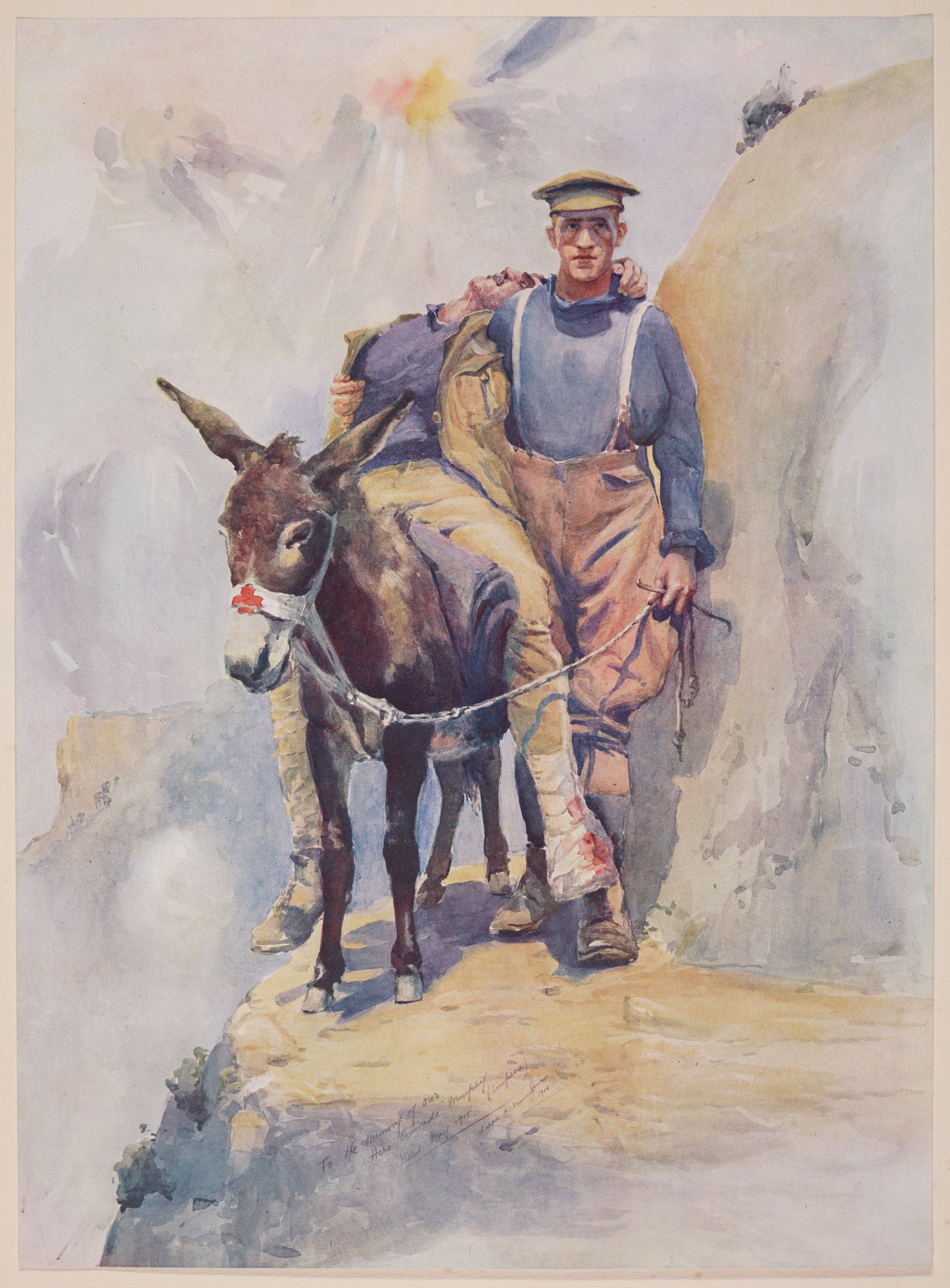
Photolithographic reproduction of a water-colour by Moore-Jones, inscribed To the memory of our hero comrade 'Murphy' (Simpson) killed May 1915. Heroes of the Red Cross. Private Simpson, D.C.M., & his donkey at Anzac, from the version of the painting now in the Australian War Memorial Museum, printed by W.J. Bryce, London 1918.

Henderson was painted in water-colour as The Man with the Donkey by Horace Moore-Jones. Moore-Jones worked from Jackson's photograph of Henderson, but believed it to be of John Simpson Kirkpatrick. At least six versions of the painting were made, and it was extensively reproduced as a portrait of Simpson; the inscriptions on some versions implied that Simpson was nicknamed "Murphy". In a newspaper interview in 1950, Henderson said that he, not Simpson, was the man in the paintings. He had "watched the legend grow" without worrying about it, but was now old and "want[ed] the matter cleared up". It was also untrue that Simpson was known as "Murphy". Murphy was the name of the donkey, which Simpson had found wandering on the beach.

A bronze sculpture by Paul Walshe of Richard Alexander Henderson as "The Man with the Donkey" stands outside the National War Memorial in Wellington. It is based on Jackson's photograph, and is a "tribute to all medical personnel, stretcher bearers and ambulance drivers who served alongside New Zealand troops in wartime". Commissioned by the Royal New Zealand Returned and Services’ Association, it was unveiled by Henderson's son Ross in 1990 for the 75th anniversary of the Gallipoli landings. The inscription on the plaque reads: "The stories of Simpson and Henderson are the stories of all stretcher-bearers ... these men exposed their lives to danger to save comrades and so built up the tradition of unselfishness and cool courage that is a feature of their service."

Henderson's story is told through the eyes of the donkey in The Donkey Man, a book for children by Glyn Harper, a military historian, with illustrations by Bruce Potter, which was published in 2004.

The Anzac of the Year Award of the Royal New Zealand Returned and Services' Association, first awarded in 2010, is a 70 cm bronze statue of Henderson and his donkey by Matt Gauldie.
