= Louise Nicholas =

New Zealand women's rights campaigner

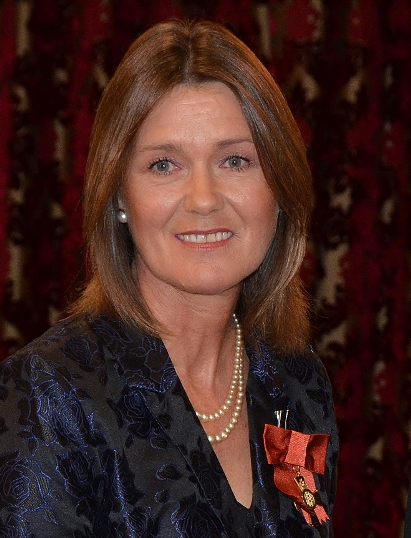
Nicholas in 2015

Louise Nicholas ONZM is a New Zealand campaigner for the rights of women who have been victims of sexual violence. She has made rape allegations against at least nine men, including at least seven police officers. Although none of these allegations have been proven in court, they have resulted in several high-profile trials and an investigation into a possible police cover-up.

== Original accusations ==
In 1993, Nicholas gave details regarding her claim of rape to Detective Inspector John Dewar who was in charge of the CIB at Rotorua. Nicholas stated that in 1984 the crime took place in a flat she rented in Rotorua, and she pressed charges against a single officer (who has never been publicly identified). During the investigation, Nicholas named three further men as co-assailants, Assistant Police Commissioner Clint Rickards and former policemen Brad Shipton and Bob Schollum. Three trials resulted. The first in December 1993 and a second in June 1994 were both ruled mistrials because of the introduction of inadmissible hearsay by Dewar. The unnamed officer was tried and acquitted in 1994.

== Additional charges against the officers ==
In 2005, Shipton and Schollum were convicted of committing unrelated rapes at Mt Maunganui in 1989, along with three other men. During their imprisonment for the 1989 rape, as a result of media investigations, the two men and Rickards were re-tried for the rape of Nicholas, and were acquitted in March 2006.

In a related prosecution, John Dewar, the detective initially handling Nicholas' complaint, was convicted in 2007 of four charges of attempting to obstruct or defeat the course of justice because he covered up allegations Nicholas made against Rickards, Shipton and Schollum. Dewar said he thought Nicholas was lying and didn't pursue the claims to protect her from charges of perjury. He was jailed for four and a half years.

== Additional accusations by Nicholas ==
During one of the rape trials, the court heard that Nicholas had said to a school teacher that she had been raped by "Maori on horseback".

== Alleged coverup and implications for New Zealand law ==
After the original 1993–94 trials, Detective Chief Inspector Rex Miller was tasked with evaluating Dewar's investigation. He found that Dewar had filed his reports on the three officers without mentioning the allegations of criminal sexual misconduct.

The case was subject to a high level of public debate about suppression orders in New Zealand Courts, and admissibility of evidence after a Dominion Post article in 2004. The evidence that at the time of the trial two of the three men were serving jail sentences for an unrelated rape of another woman in the 1980s was suppressed by the Courts in accordance with New Zealand law. Women's groups broke suppression orders by publicising the details with flyers and on the internet.

After the end of the second case, suppression orders were lifted and there was widespread publicity given to the fact that Shipton and Schollum had been convicted in 2005 of unlawful sexual connection. Schollum is currently serving a prison sentence. Shipton was released in November 2008 after serving 3 years of his 8 1/2-year sentence. Rickards was suspended from his position in early 2004 and resigned from the police on 22 November 2007.

== Advocacy work ==
Nicholas has worked as a survivor advocate for Rape Prevention Education and has served on the Tauiwi Caucus of the Executive Committee of Te Ohaakii a Hine – National Network Ending Sexual Violence Together. In 2015, she was the patron of a class of police recruits at the Royal New Zealand Police College and involved in mentoring and advising the recruits during their training.

A year after the media investigations led to historical sex charges against the police officers in Nicholas’ case, she published her best selling book in 2007. With help from co-author and investigative journalist Philip Kitchin, Nicholas revealed the role of the former chief inspector in the Rotorua criminal investigation branch in obstructing prior rape trials.

In 2009, Nicholas won the role of the “survivor advocate” who reports to government task force on sexual violence. Many believed that Nicholas was the perfect fit for this role, considering she had been advocating against sexual violence since her own high-profile rape case unfolded. Nicholas was then given government funding for a year to collect the stories of other sexual assault and violence victims for schools, health professionals and policy makers. Over the next year of her research she planned on developing a project on discussing the themes that come from survivors of sexual assault and violence and its effects. Her research was planned to feed into a task force on sexual violence and reporting on issues such as, how victims can be better supported in the judicial system. Nicholas' own story and her public advocacy during this role allowed other nations to discuss whether they needed better education and more political and judicial coverage on sexual violence.

Nicholas established the Louise Nicholas Trust on 1 July 2023. It is a registered charity "dedicated to supporting survivors of sexual violence in Aotearoa New Zealand".

== Recognition ==
On 15 December 2007, Nicholas was named New Zealander of the Year by The New Zealand Herald due to her courage during the rape trials of former policemen Rickards, Shipton and Schollum. In 2015 she was the recipient of the Anzac of the Year Award and in the 2015 Queen's Birthday Honours she was appointed an Officer of the New Zealand Order of Merit for services to the prevention of sexual violence.

In 2014, the Rape Prevention Education website named 31 March Louise Nicholas Day as a day for focusing on sexual violence, and creating a goal to positively impact the progress on sexual violence each year. The group named it after Nicholas because they felt she represented what the prevention group stood for.

Also in 2014, a telemovie directed by New Zealand director Robert Sarkies, Consent: The Louise Nicholas Story, was released. The film discussed and portrayed Nicholas' story of events involving her rape accusations and what happened from her perspective. The film won Best Television Feature in the 2014 New Zealand Film Awards.

== See also ==
- New Zealand Police#Historical sexual misconduct by police
