= ANZAC Cove =

WWI battle-site in Gallipoli, Turkey

Coordinates: 40°14′10″N 26°16′39″E

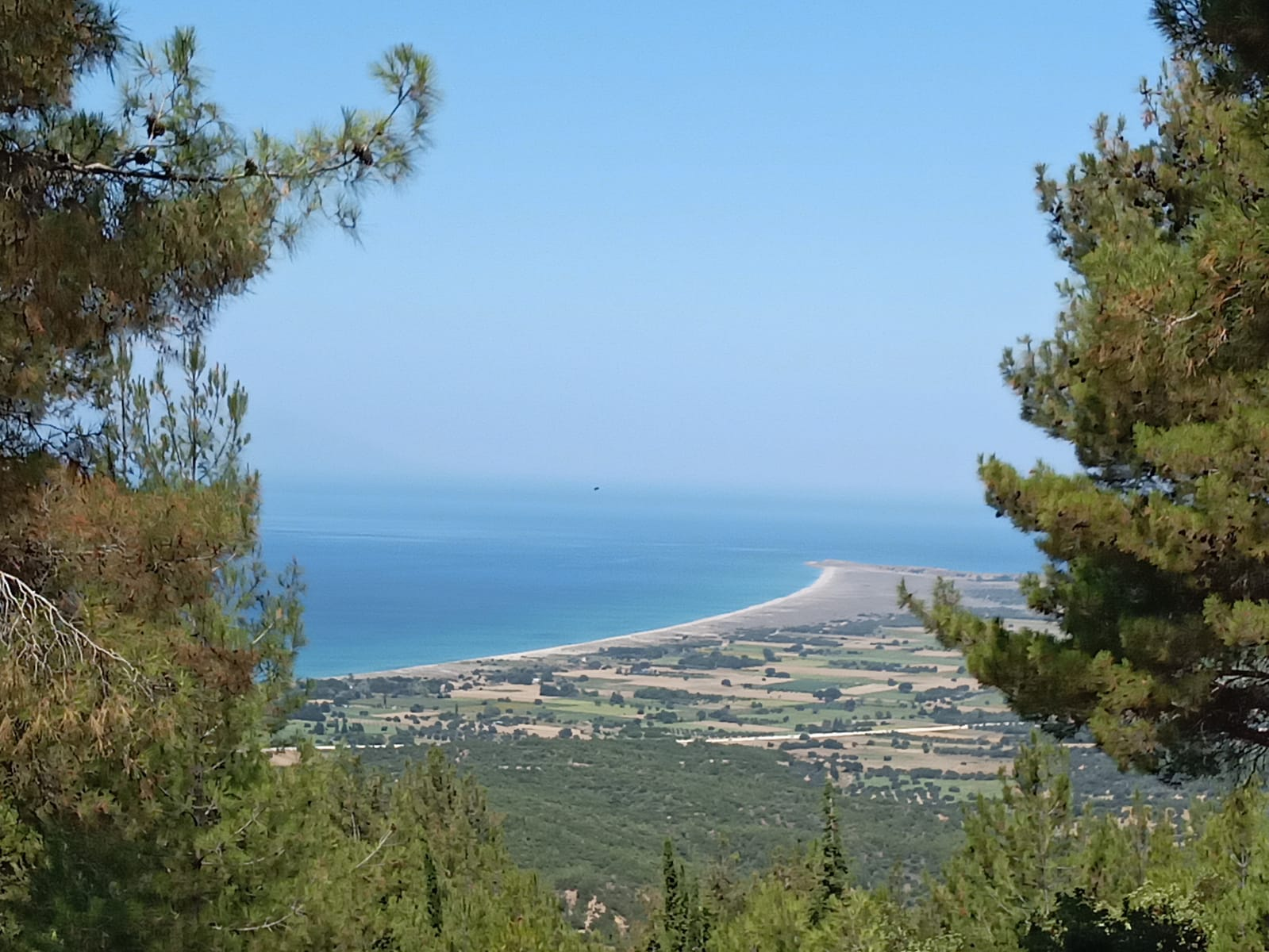
ANZAC Cove looking towards Arıburnu, 2020

ANZAC Cove (Turkish: Anzak Koyu) is a small cove on the Gallipoli peninsula in Turkey. It became famous as the site of World War I landing of the ANZACs (Australian and New Zealand Army Corps) on 25 April 1915. The cove is 600 metres (2,000 ft) long, bounded by the headlands of Arıburnu to the north and Little Arıburnu, known as Hell Spit, to the south. Following the landing at ANZAC Cove, the beach became the main base for the Australian and New Zealand troops for the eight months of the Gallipoli campaign.

== Gallipoli campaign, 1915–1916 ==
The first objective for soldiers coming ashore in enemy-held territory was to establish a beachhead, a safe section of beach protected from enemy attack where supplies and extra troops could be safely brought ashore.

ANZAC Cove was always within 1 kilometre (3,300 ft) of the front-line, well within the range of Turkish artillery, though spurs from the high ground of Plugge's Plateau, which rose above Arıburnu, provided some protection. General William Birdwood, commander of Anzac, made his headquarters in a gully overlooking the cove, as did the commanders of the New Zealand and Australian Division and the Australian 1st Division. On 29 April, General Birdwood recommended that the original landing site between the two headlands be known as "Anzac Cove" and that the surrounding, hitherto nameless, area occupied by his corps be known as "ANZAC".

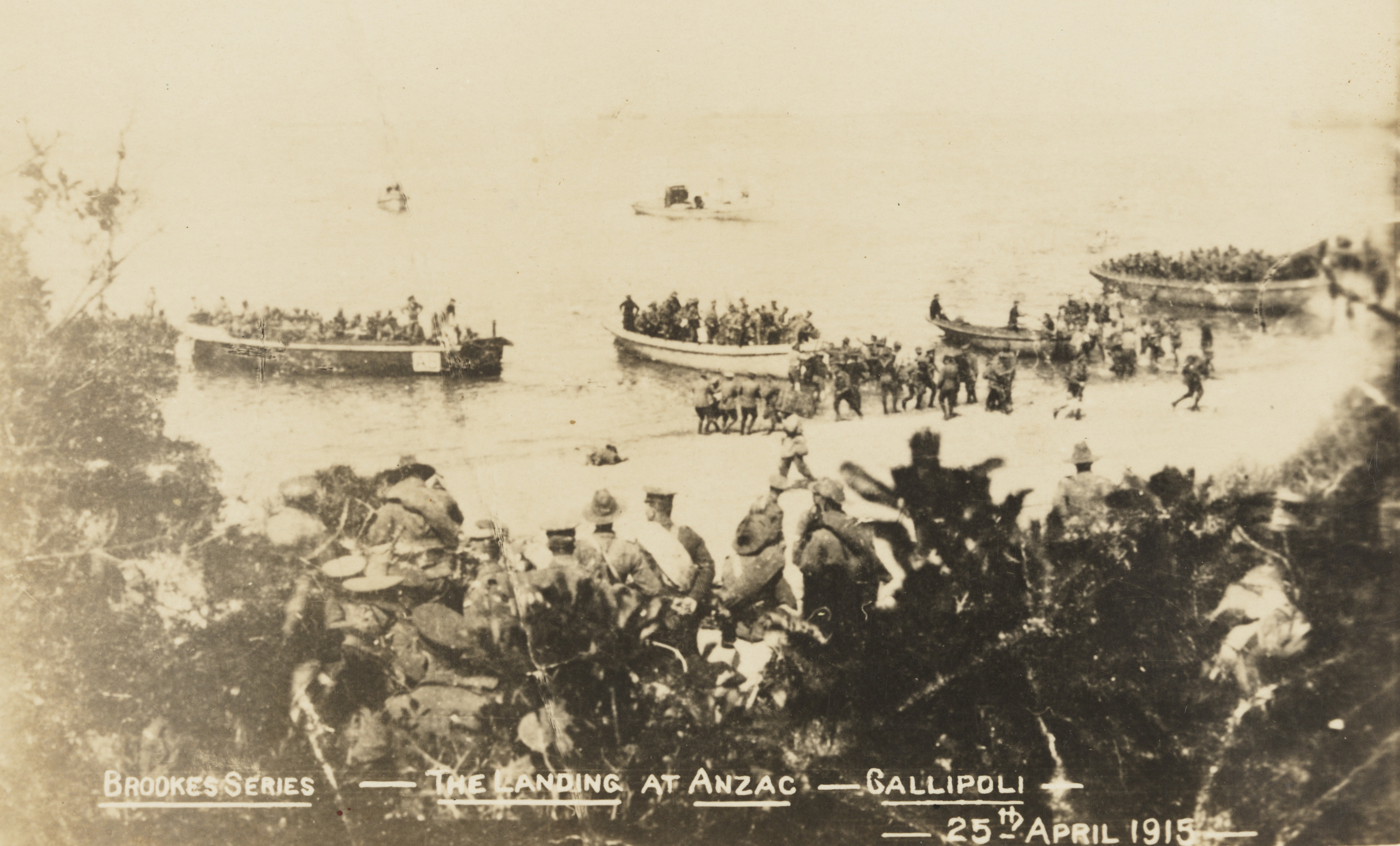
Landing of Australian troops (4th Battalion) at ANZAC Cove, 25 April 1915

The beach itself became an enormous supply dump and two field hospitals were established, one at either end. Four floating jetties were quickly constructed for the landing of stores, later replaced in July by a permanent structure known as "Watson's Pier". The volume of stores quickly overflowed onto the adjacent beaches; firstly onto Brighton Beach to the south of the cove and later onto North Beach beyond Arıburnu. Three wireless radio stations were established on the beach to maintain contact with the fleet.

While the cove was relatively sheltered from shellfire from across the peninsula, the Chanak forts, as well as the Turkish battleships Turgut Reis and Barbaros Hayreddin anchored in the Dardanelles, shelled the waters off the cove and it was partially exposed to view from Gaba Tepe to the south and completely open to view from Nibrunesi Point at the southern tip of Suvla Bay to the north. Nibrunesi Point was under the guns of the Royal Navy so was never used to fire on ANZAC, however the well-concealed Turkish battery at Gaba Tepe, known as "Beachy Bill", was a constant menace.

Private Victor Laidlaw wrote of the dangers posed by Beachy Bill in his diary:

31.8.15 (31 August 1915) Today Beachey Bill killed a large number on the beach. This gun has now accounted for 2,000 casualties.

2.9.15 (2 September 1915) This morning I went down to medical comforts, after this went down with Harry to draw rations, had a swim at the same time. Just as we were coming out Beachey Bill opened fire with shrapnel, we all made a hurried exit for cover, but one poor beggar caught one right through the heart, and died immediately, he was a member of the 6th Battalion, such is the 'Irony of Fate', this lad was alive and well a minute ago, now he's dead, we took him away to the dugout where all men killed are put (they are usually buried the same day by a chaplain).

Despite the shelling and Turkish snipers, ANZAC Cove was a popular swimming beach for the soldiers. At ANZAC it was a struggle to supply sufficient water for drinking and there was rarely any available for washing. Most soldiers disregarded all but the fiercest shelling rather than interrupt the one luxury available to them.

== Commemorations ==
On Anzac Day in 1985, the name "Anzac Cove" was officially recognised by the Turkish government. The Anzac Day dawn service was held at Arıburnu Cemetery within the cove until 1999 when the number of people attending outgrew the site. A purpose-built "Anzac Commemorative Site" was constructed nearby on North Beach in time for the 2000 service.

Over the years, Anzac Cove beach has been degraded by erosion, and the construction of the coast road from Kabatepe to Suvla, originally started by Australian engineers just prior to the evacuation of Anzac in December 1915, resulted in the beach being further reduced and bounded by a steep earth embankment. The only way onto the beach was via the Commonwealth War Graves Commission cemeteries at each headland, Arıburnu Cemetery, and Beach Cemetery.

In 2003 the Australian government announced that it was negotiating with Turkey to place Anzac Cove on the National Heritage List, which included Australian sites such as the Eureka Stockade gardens. However this request was dismissed by the Turkish government as the Gallipoli peninsula is Turkish territory and already a national park in the Turkish National Park System. In 2004 the Australian Minister for Veteran's Affairs, Danna Vale, made a request to the Turkish authorities that roadworks be carried out in the area. In 2005, the resultant efforts to widen the road to provide a bus parking area for the Commemorative Site covered some of the remaining beach, making it impossible to traverse, and cut into Plugge's Plateau, making the path to the summit and Plugge's Plateau Cemetery impassable.

On 18 October 2005 the federal minister for veterans affairs, Danna Vale, called for the battlefield to be recreated in Australia, saying that the physical similarity between the end of the Mornington Peninsula, in Victoria, and Anzac Cove, in Turkey, is "uncanny".

== Gallery ==
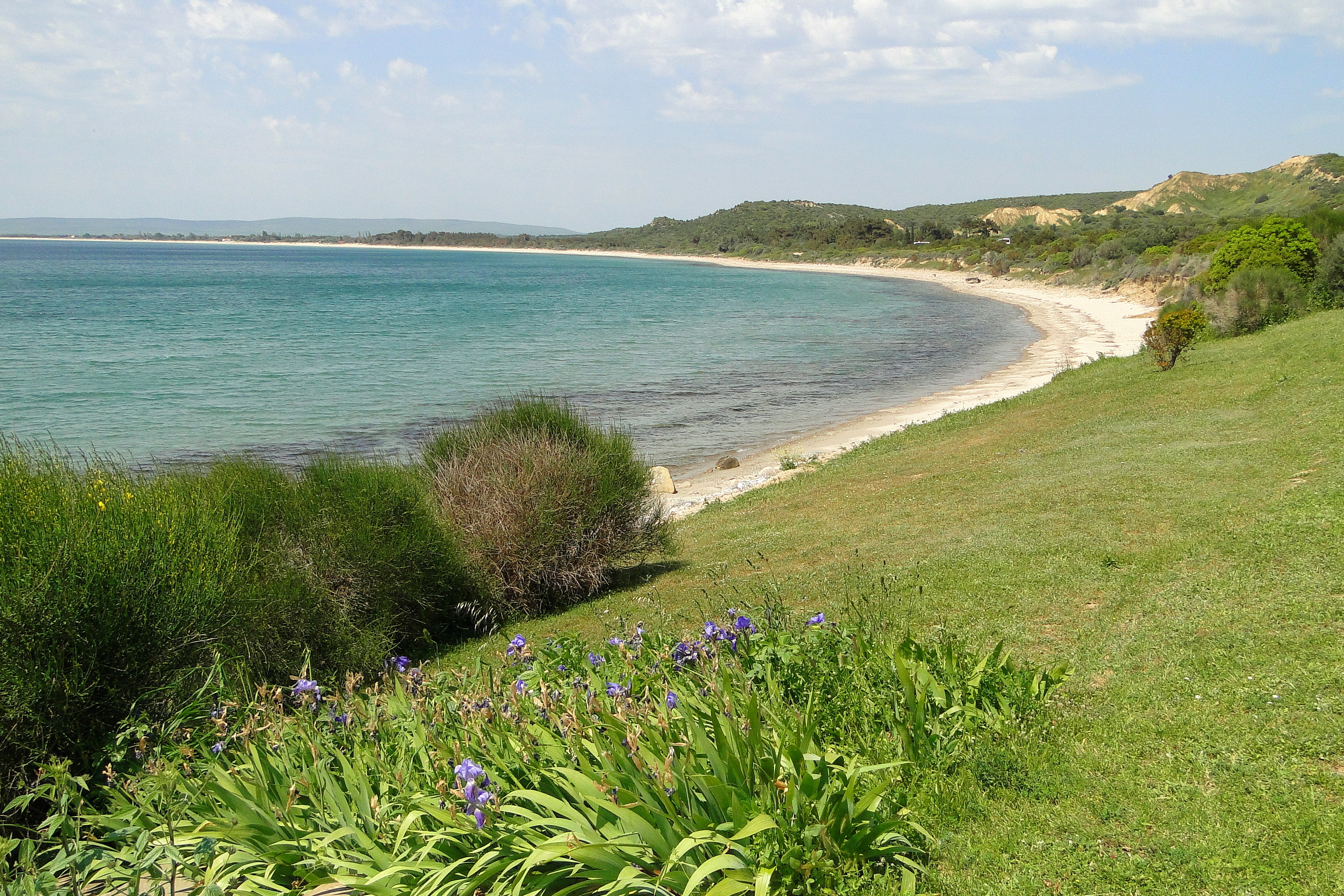
North Beach looking toward Suvla

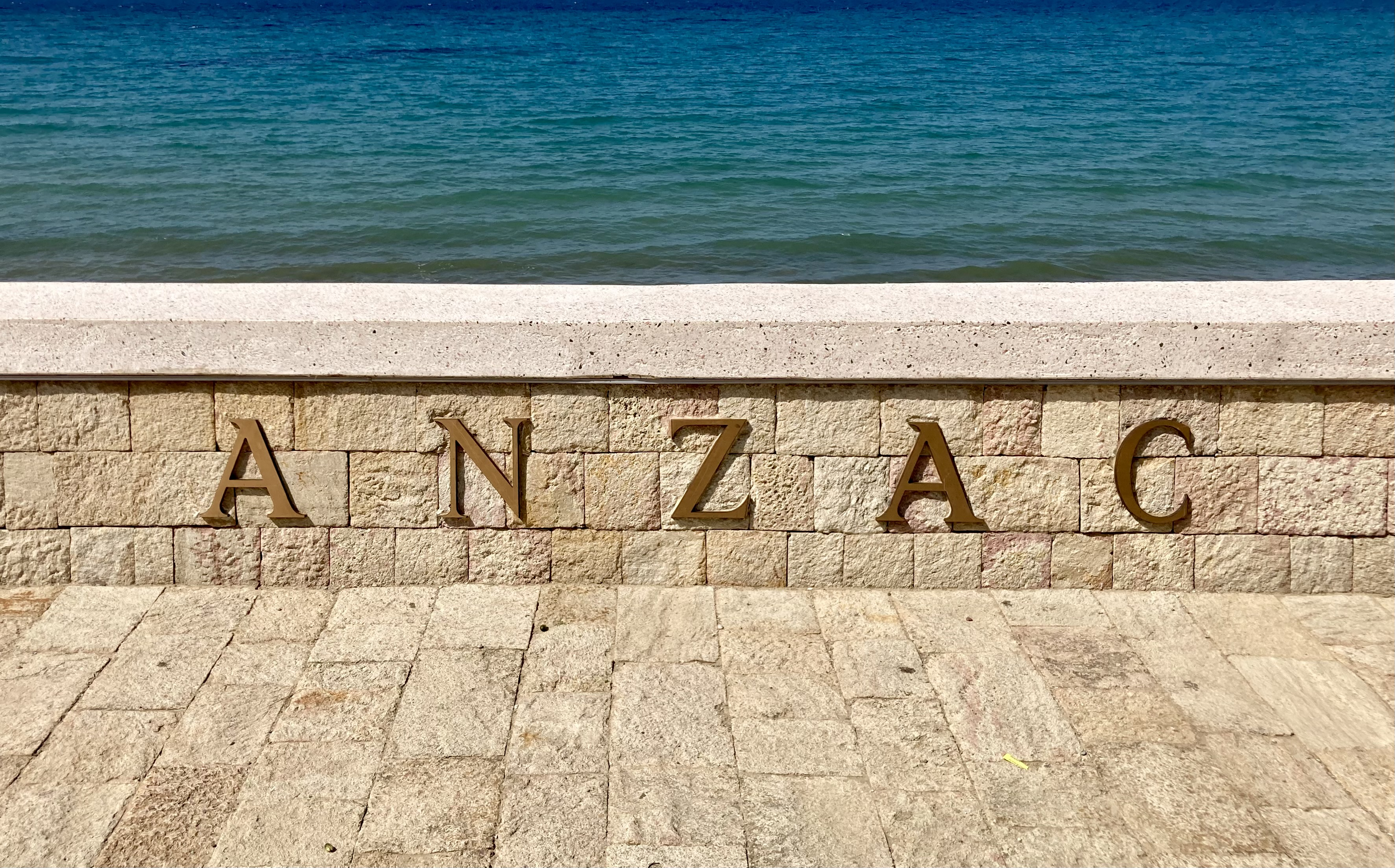
Anzac commemorative site

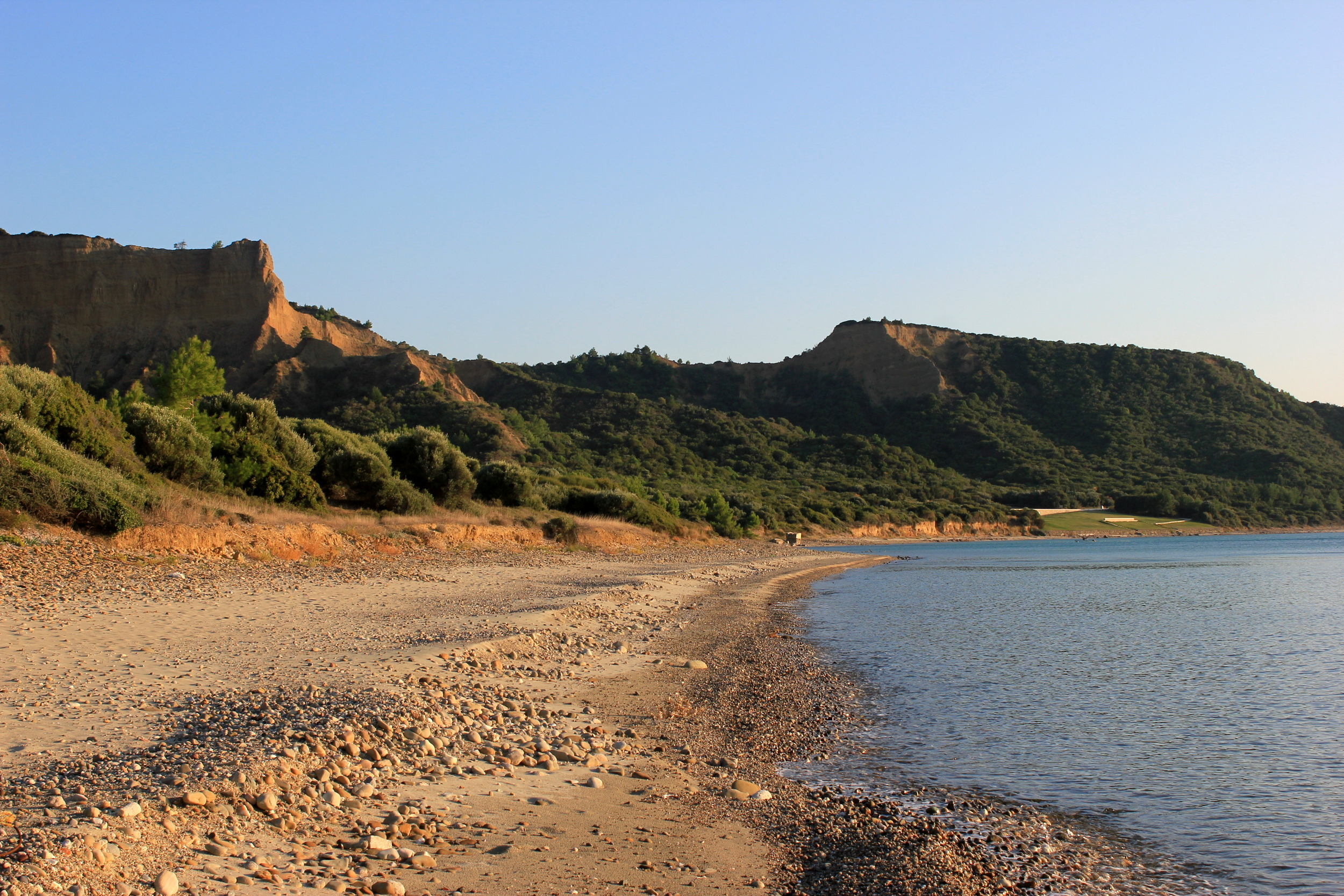
North Beach with "sphinx" rock in the background.

== See also ==
- Leon Gellert's poem "Anzac Cove", written in 1916.
