= 2026 New Year Honours (New Zealand) =

- Previous: 2025 New Zealand bravery awards Next: 2026 King's Birthday Honours
- Type: New Zealand royal honours: New Zealand Order of Merit; King's Service Order; King's Service Medal; New Zealand Distinguished Service Decoration
- Date: 31 December 2025
- Country: New Zealand
- Total recipients: 177

The 2026 New Year Honours in New Zealand were appointments by Charles III in his right as King of New Zealand, on the advice of the New Zealand government, to various orders and honours to reward and highlight good works by New Zealanders, and to celebrate the passing of 2025 and the beginning of 2026. They were announced on 31 December 2025.

The recipients of honours are listed here as they were styled before their new honour.

== New Zealand Order of Merit ==
=== Dame Companion (DNZM) ===
- Professor Helen Victoria Danesh-Meyer CNZM – of Remuera. For services to ophthalmology.
- Coral May Shaw – of Te Awamutu. For services to public service, the judiciary and the community.
- Dorothy Myrtle Spotswood – of Oriental Bay. For services to philanthropy.
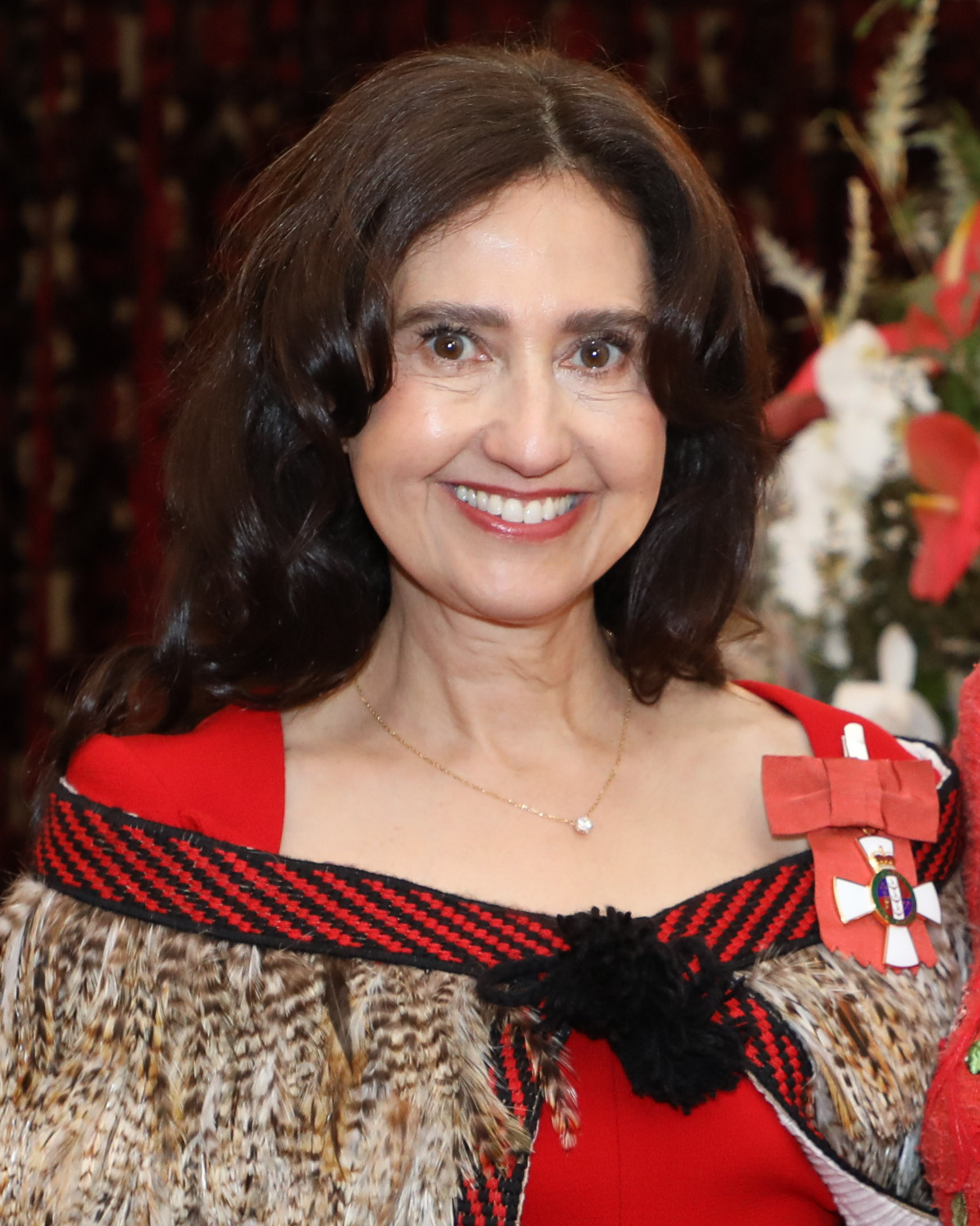
Dame Helen Danesh-Meyer

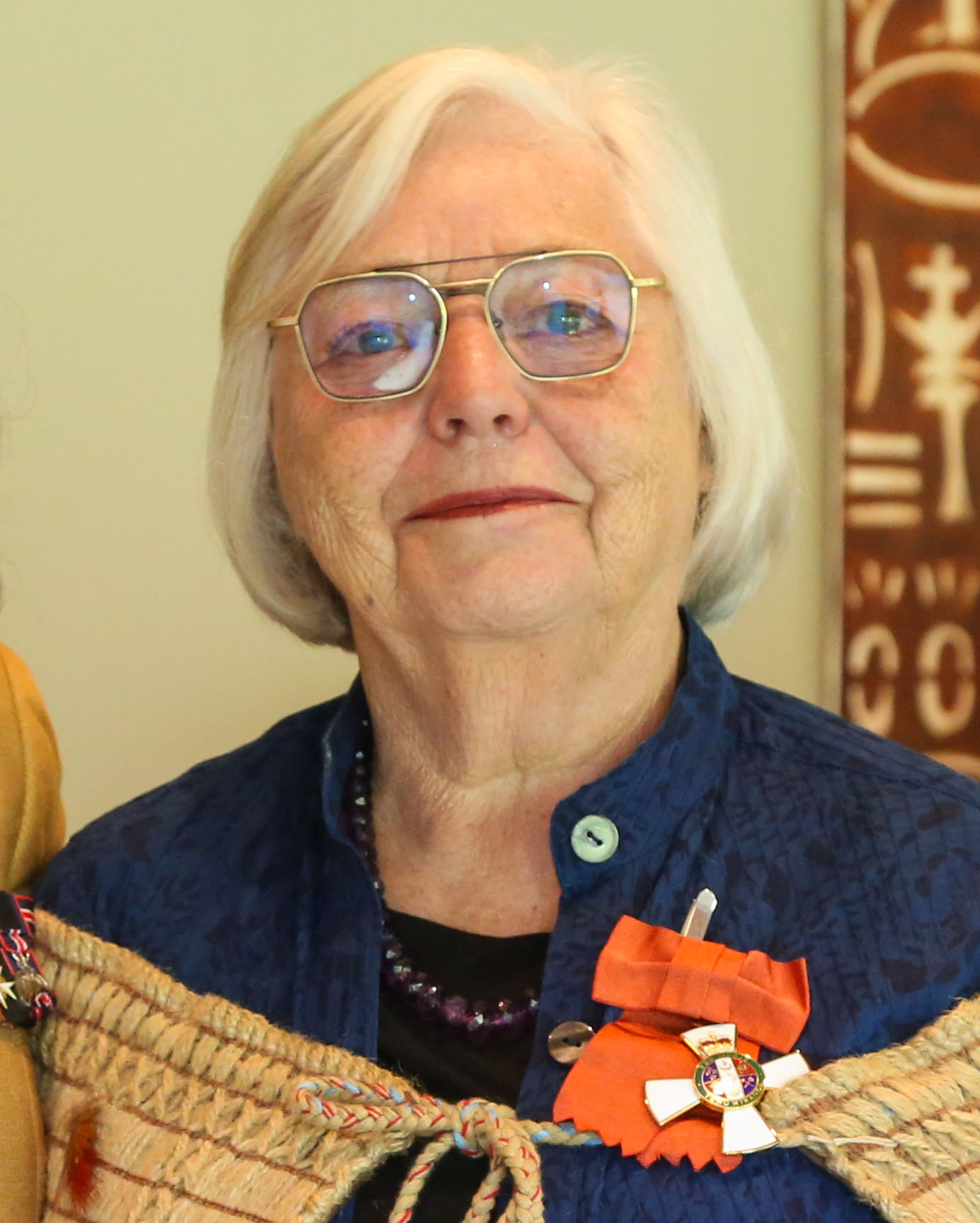
Dame Coral Shaw

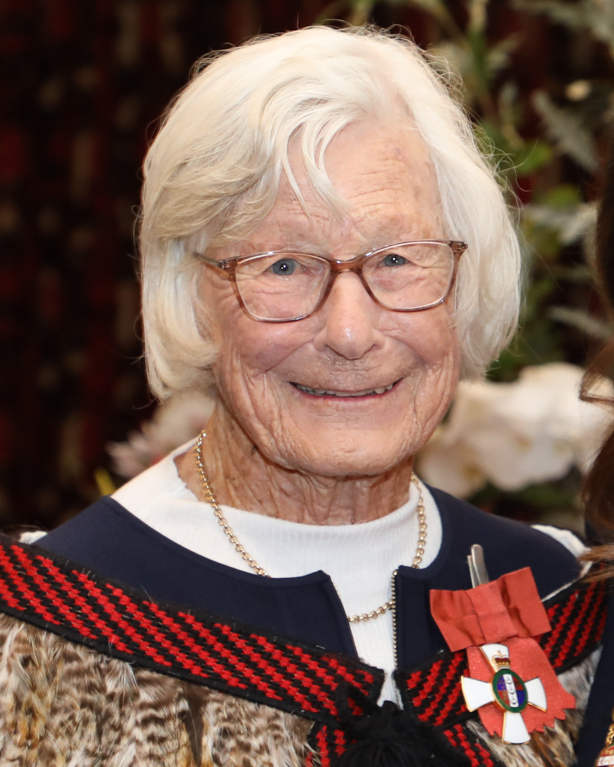
Dame Dorothy Spotswood

=== Knight Companion (KNZM) ===
- Scott Ronald Glyndwr Dixon CNZM – of Indianapolis. For services to motorsport.
- Rodney Kenneth Drury – of Queenstown. For services to business, the technology industry and philanthropy.
- Professor Graham Stephen Le Gros CNZM – of Kelburn. For services to medical science.
- Christopher Wilton Parkin CNZM – of Te Aro. For services to philanthropy and the arts.
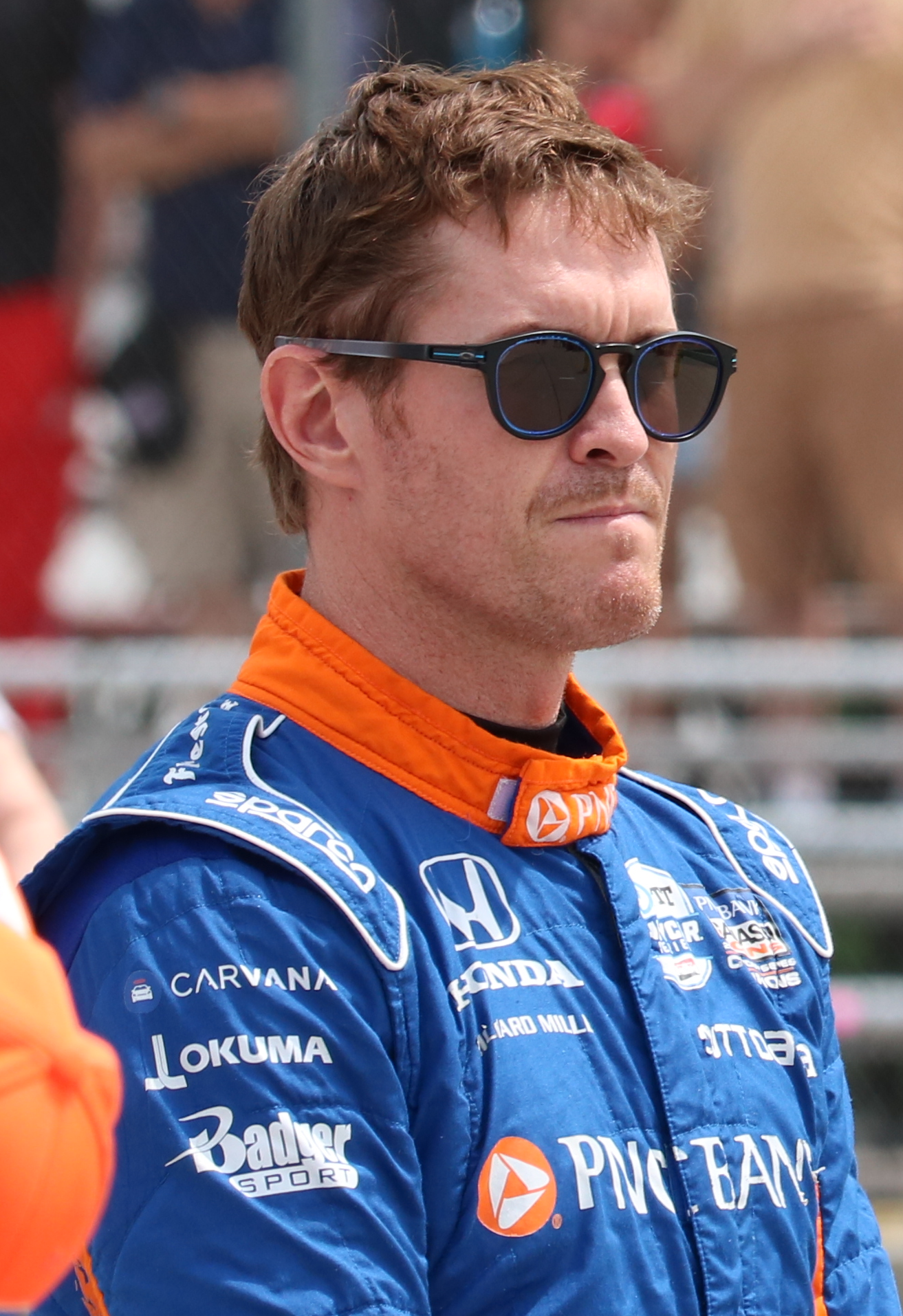
Sir Scott Dixon

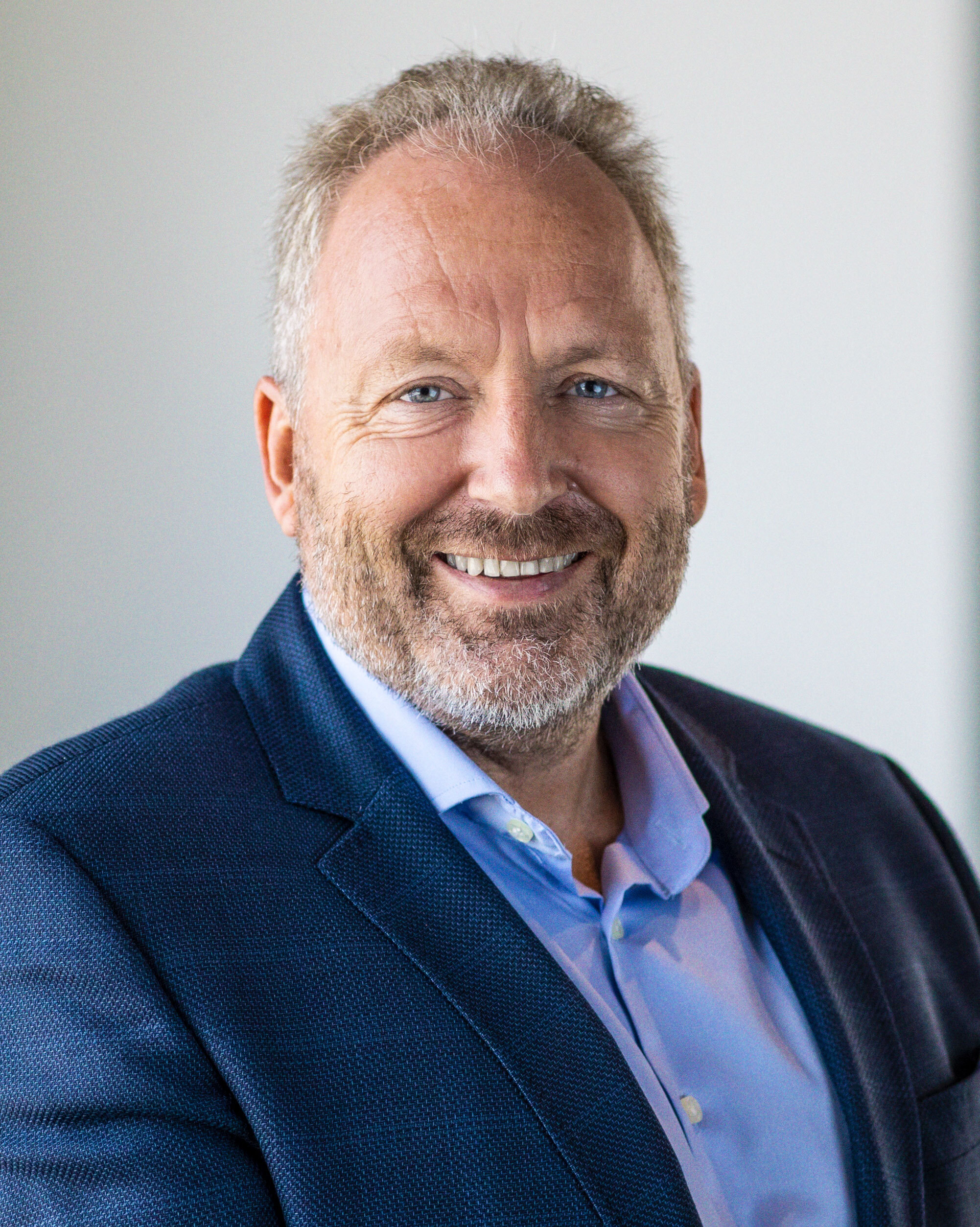
Sir Rod Drury

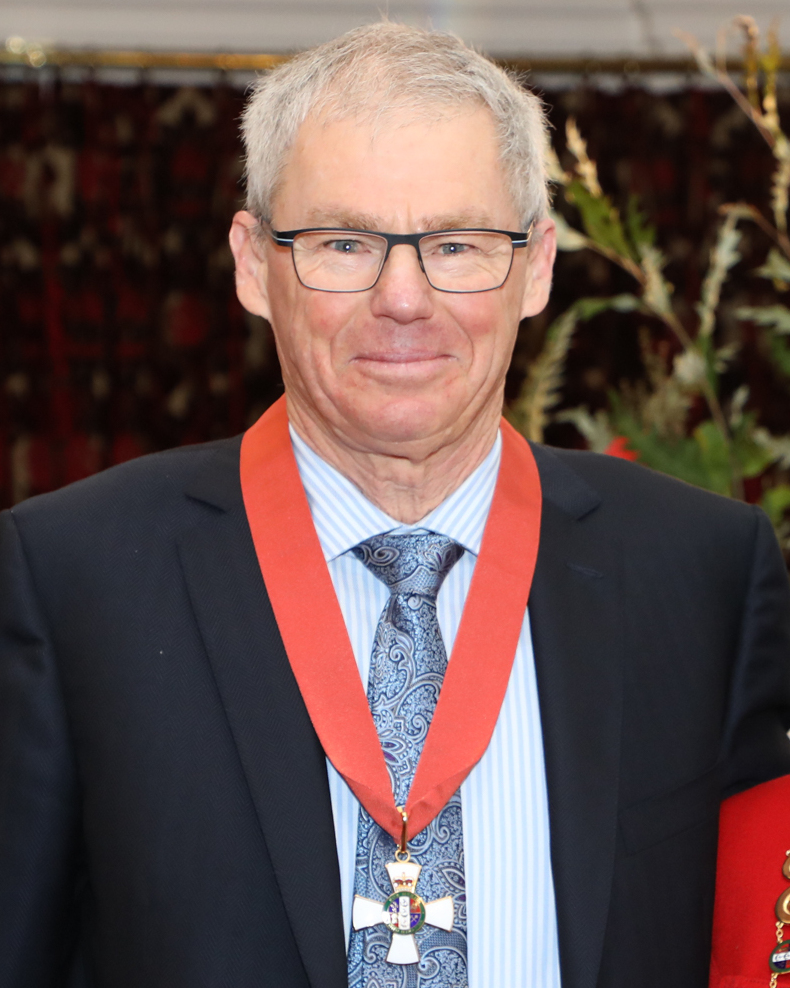
Sir Graham Le Gros

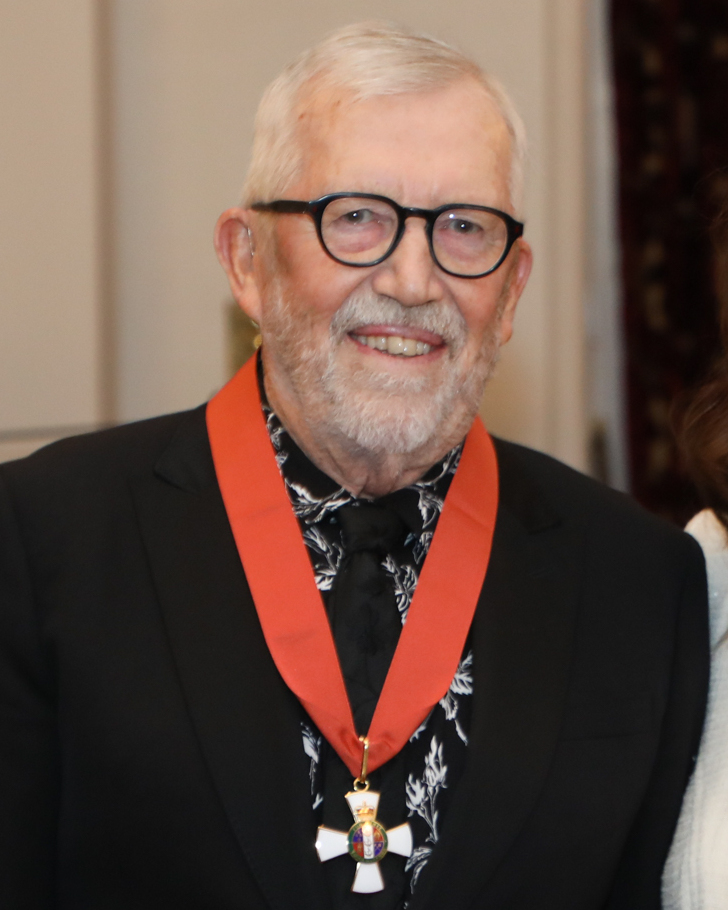
Sir Chris Parkin

=== Companion (CNZM) ===
- Gregor John Barclay – of Remuera. For services to sports governance.
- Neil Frank Bateup ONZM – of Ohinewai. For services to the rural sector.
- Leith Pirika Comer QSO – of Rotorua. For services to Māori, governance and education.
- Professor Charl Johannes de Villiers – of Rothesay Bay. For services to accountancy.
- Dr Bruce William Hayward MNZM – of Remuera. For services to geology, particularly micropaleontology.
- Professor Beverley-Anne Lawton ONZM – of Te Aro. For services to women's health.
- Distinguished Professor Gaven John Martin – of Albany. For services to mathematics and education.
- Distinguished Professor Paul James Moughan – of Devonport. For services to science.
- Anthony Zan (Tony) Quinn – of Cromwell. For services to motorsport and the community.
- Professor Thomas Charles Roa JP – of Hamilton. For services to Māori language and education.
- Rachel Emere Taulelei MNZM – of Hataitai. For services to business, Māori and governance.
- Donald Stanley Mackintosh Trott ONZM JP – of Whanganui. For services to opera.
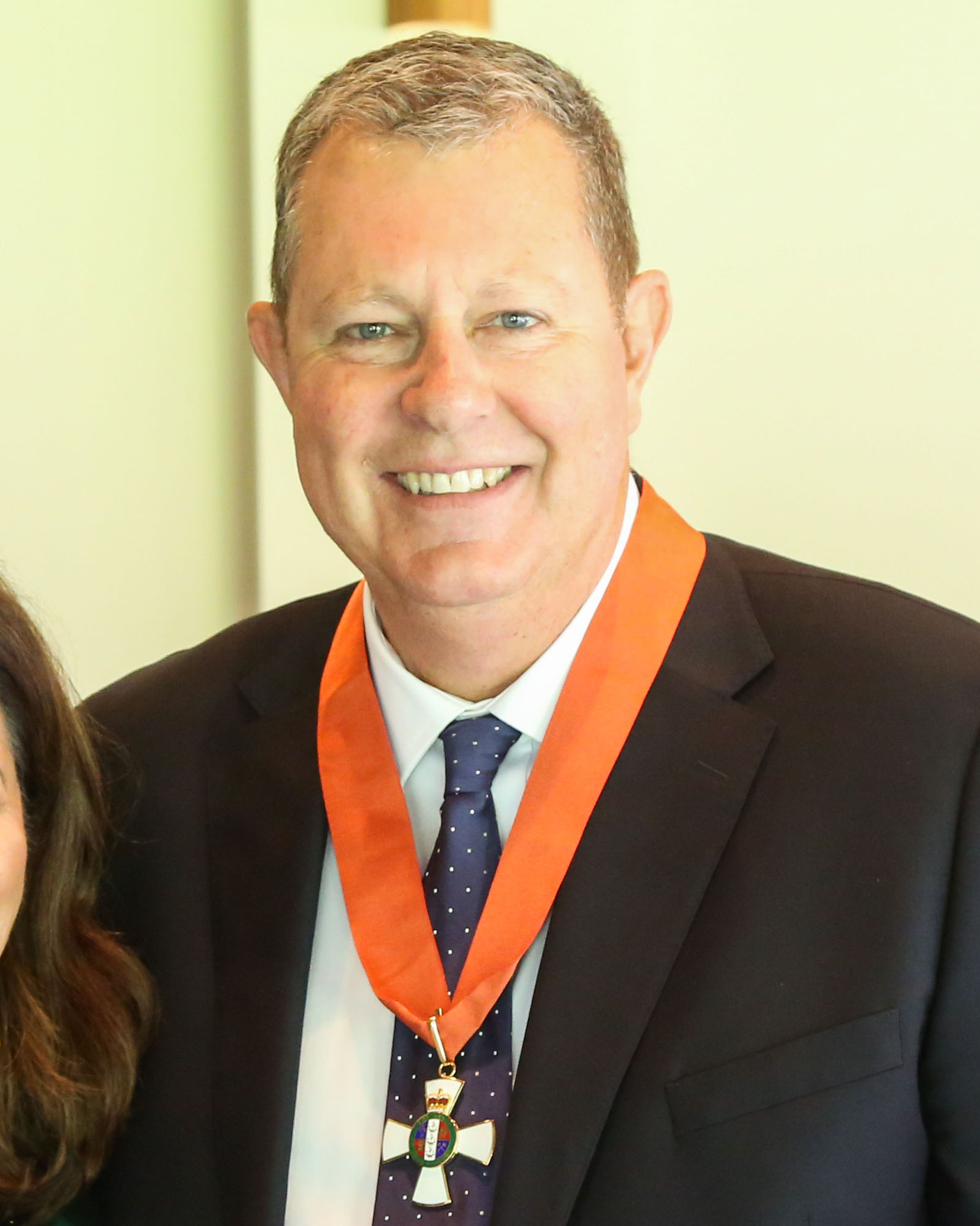
Greg Barclay

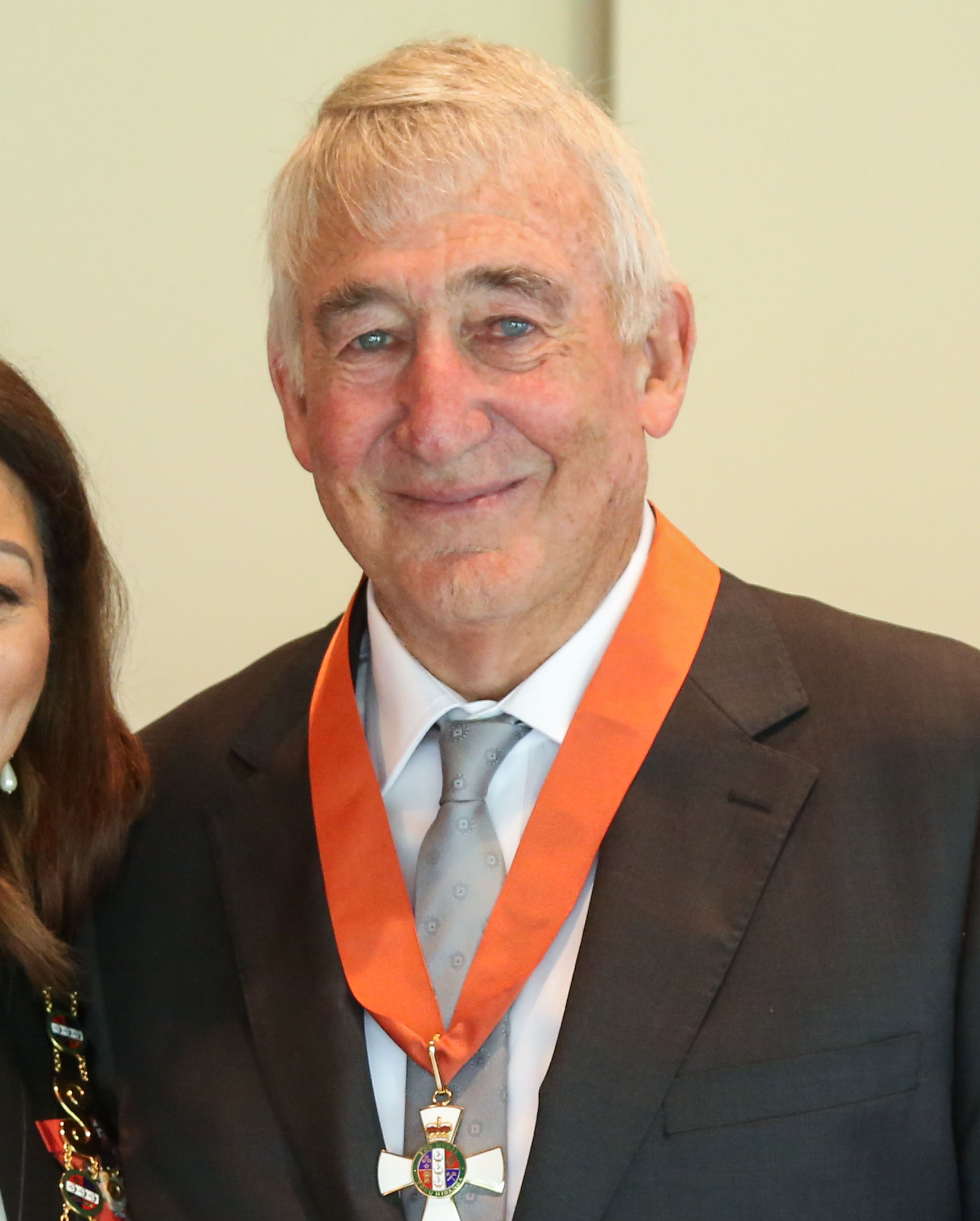
Neil Bateup

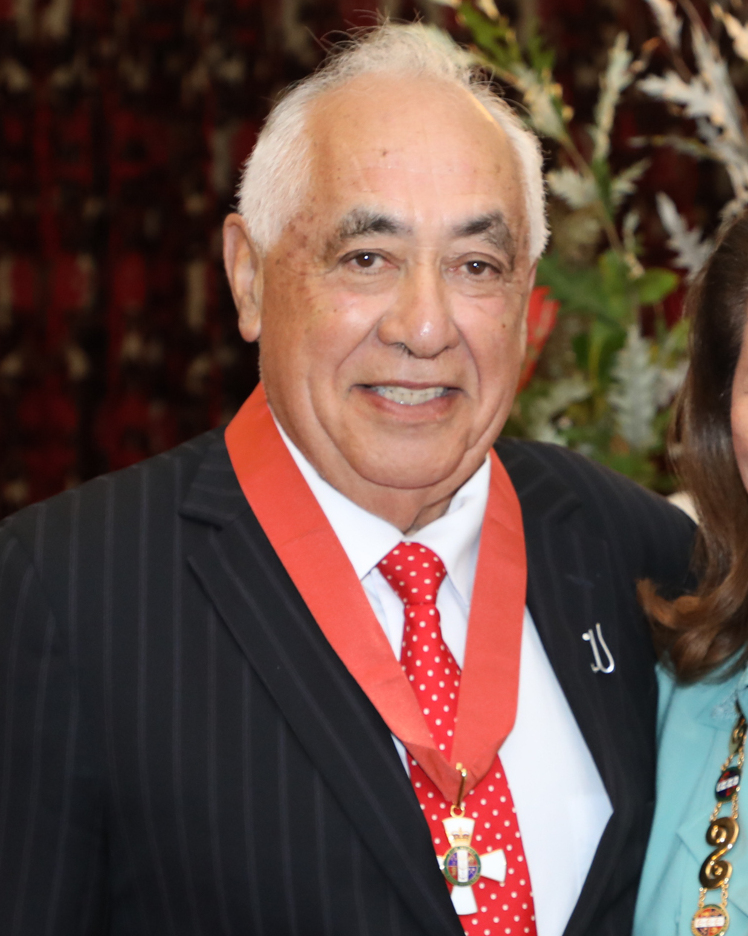
Leith Comer

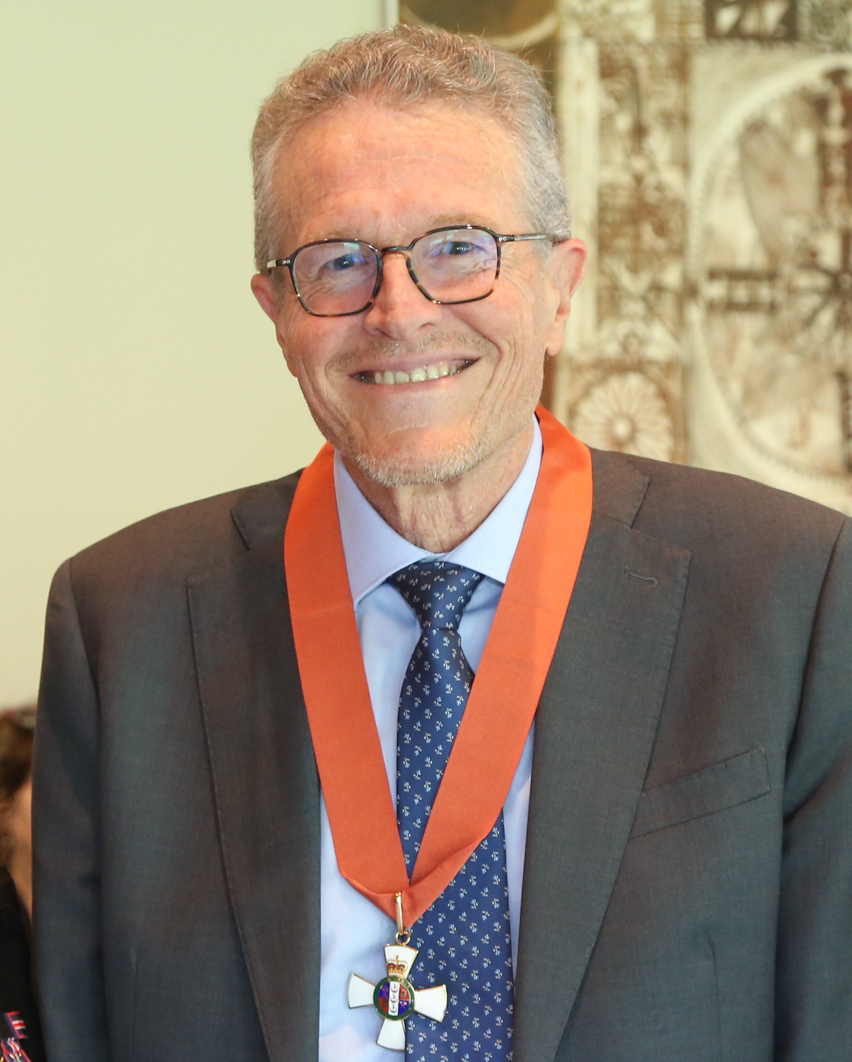
Charl de Villiers

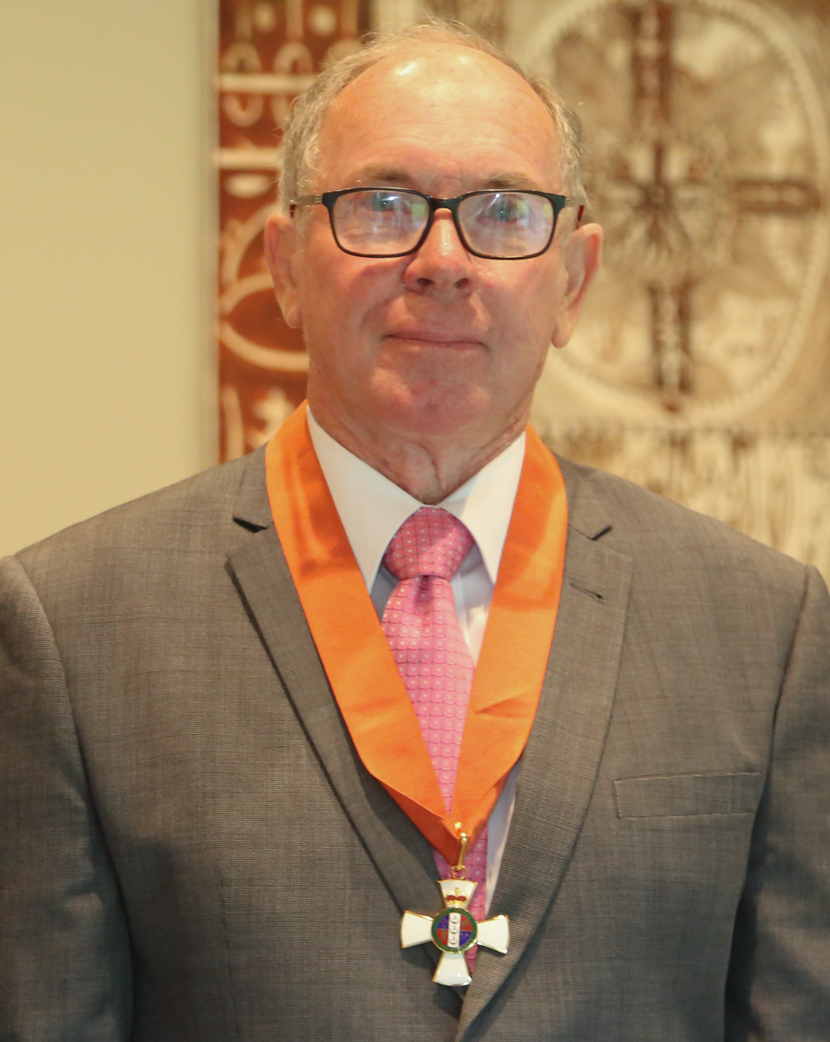
Bruce Hayward

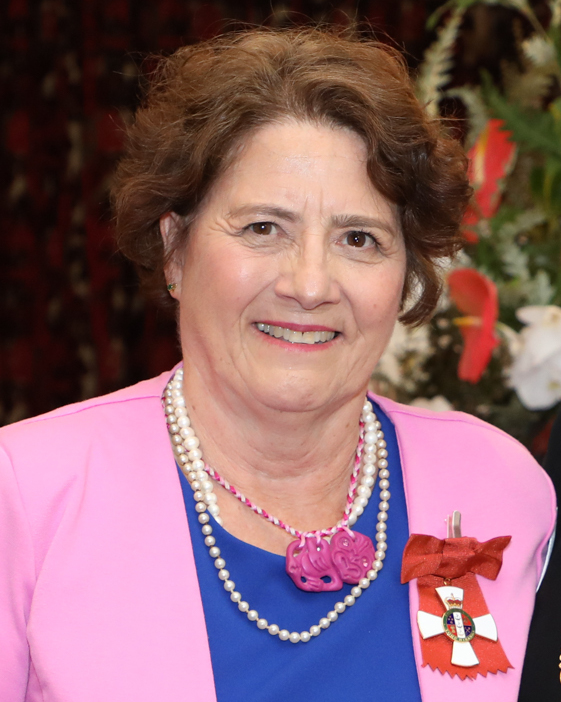
Bev Lawton

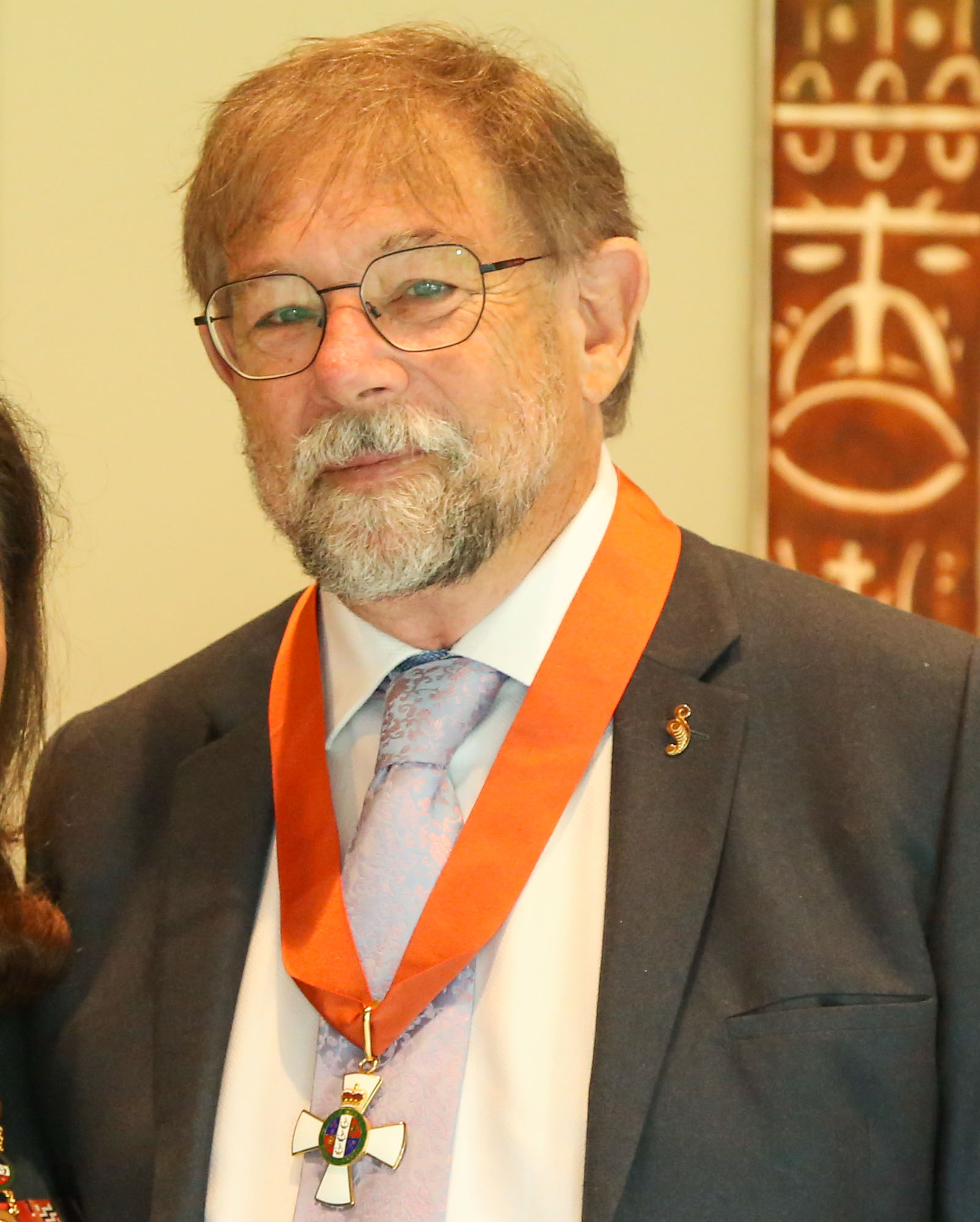
Gaven Martin

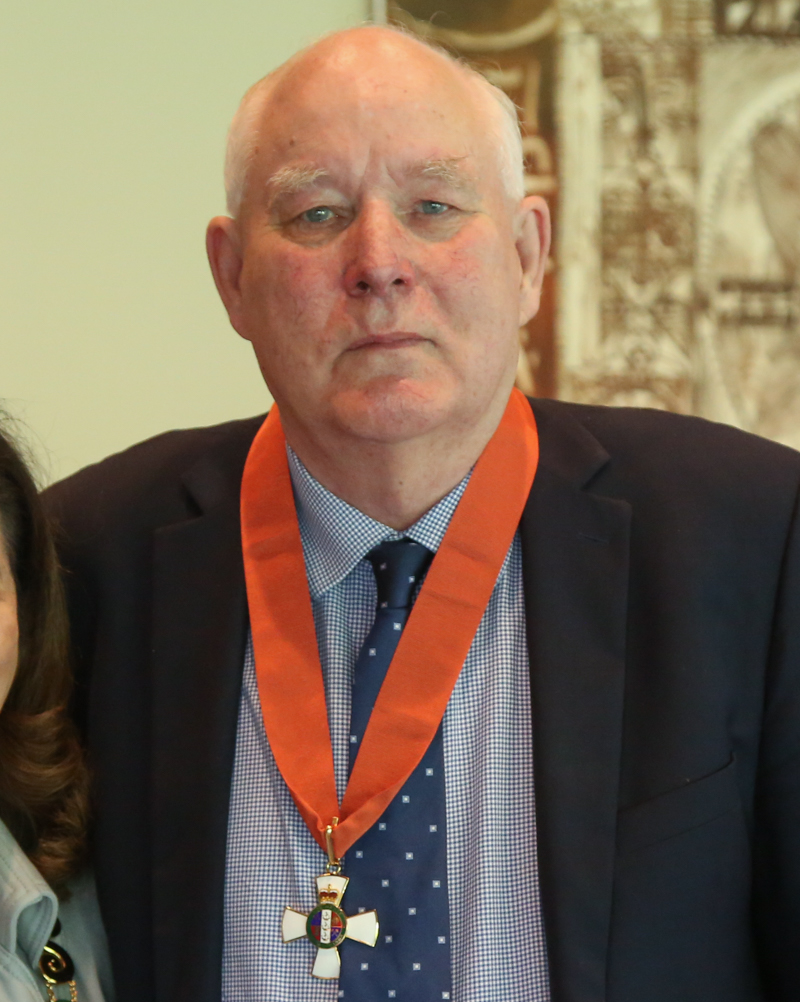
Paul Moughan

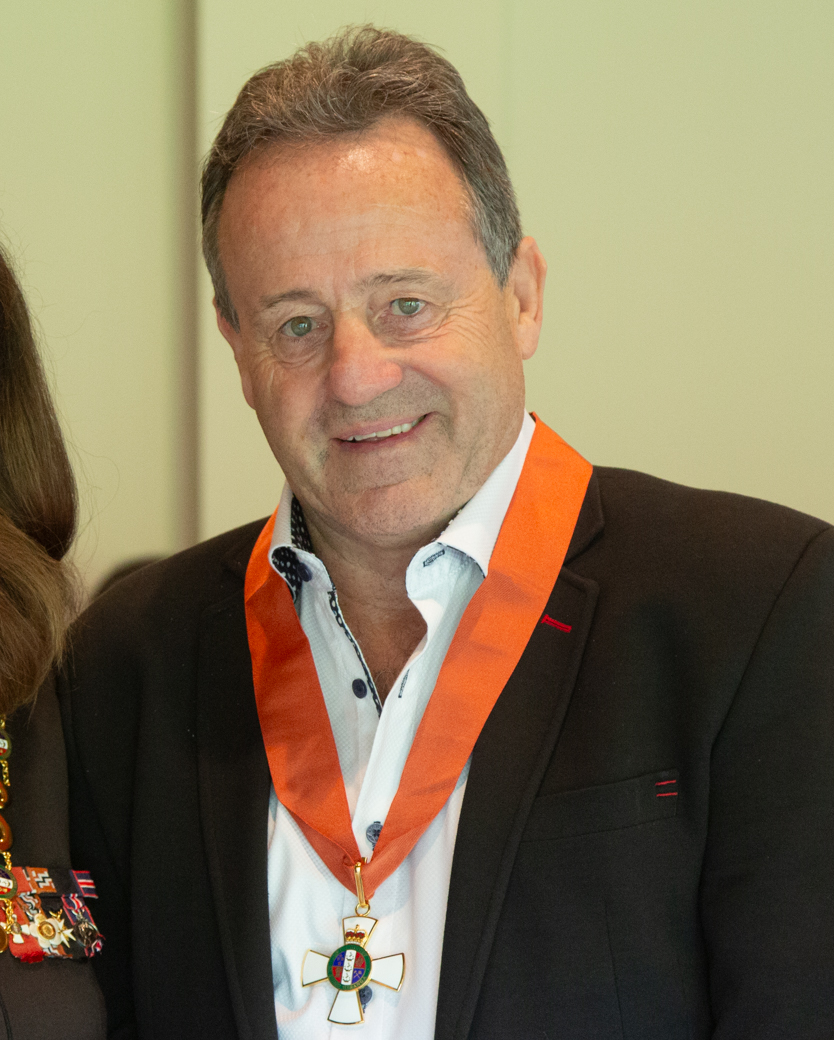
Tony Quinn

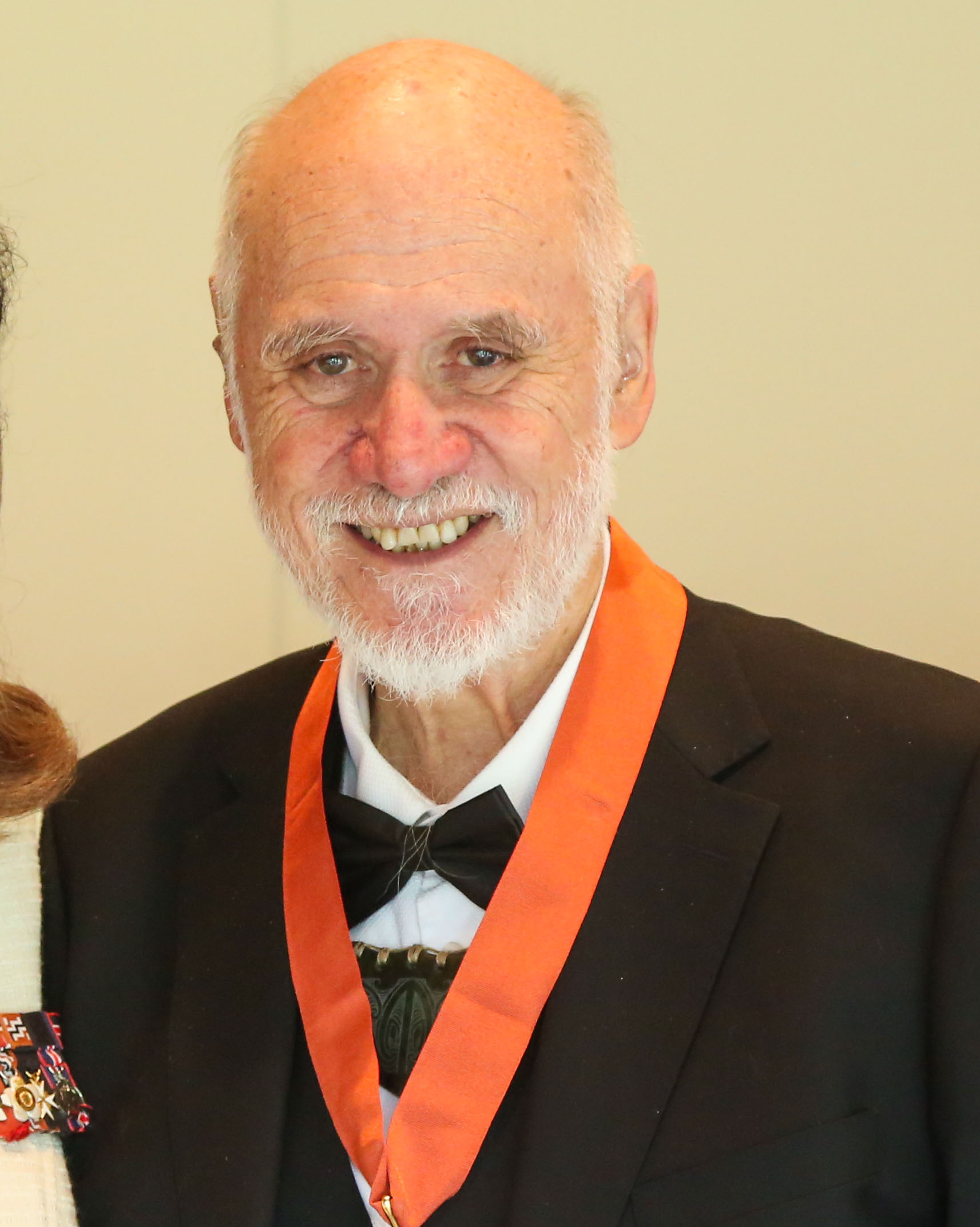
Tom Roa

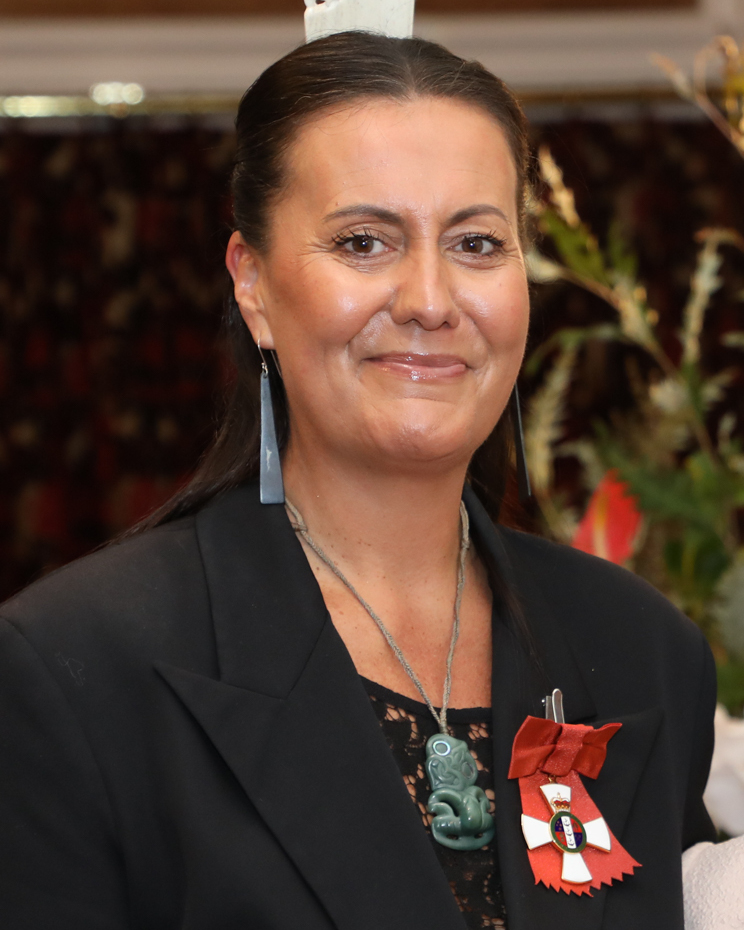
Rachel Taulelei

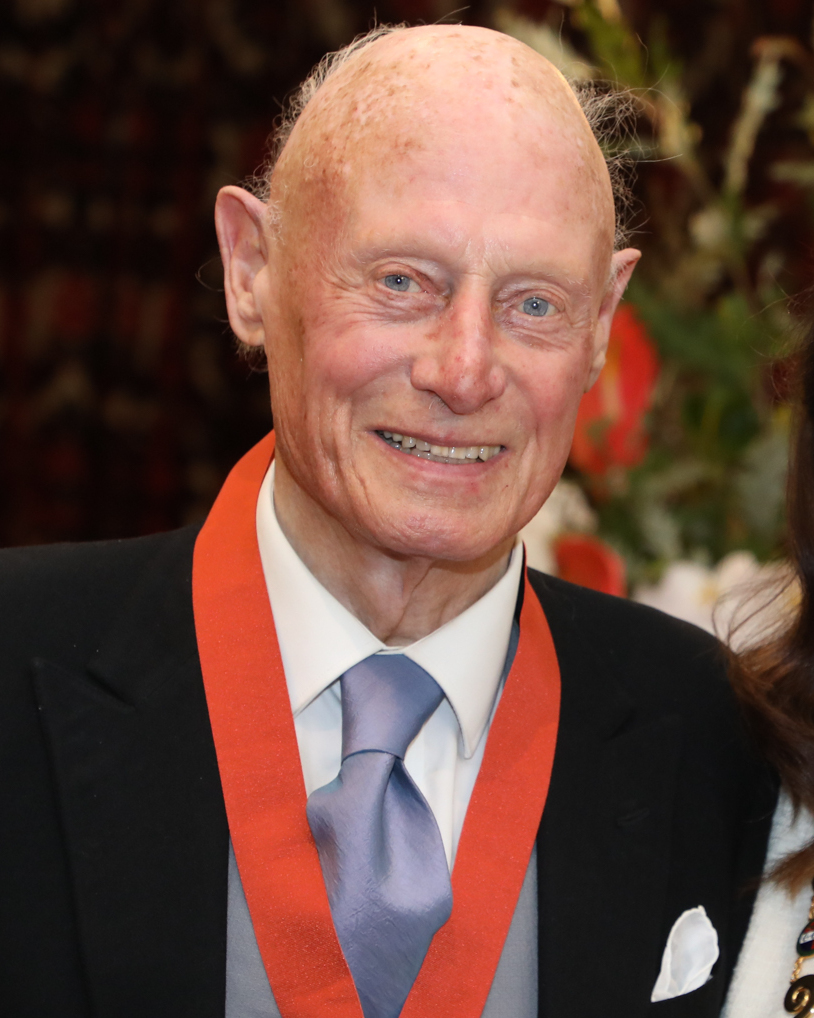
Donald Trott

=== Officer (ONZM) ===
- Reverend Dr Patricia Ann Allan – of Cashmere. For services to survivors of abuse.
- Graham Carr – of Geraldine. For services to the deer industry and the community.
- Matthew David Corner – of Tawa. For services to people with intellectual and learning disabilities.
- Christina Cowan – of Hastings. For services to Mãori, particularly blind and low-vision people.
- Brian Rex Davies – of Palmerston North. For services to motorsport.
- Rodney Phillip Mathew Dixon – of Upper Moutere. For services to athletics.
- Lloyd Walker Downing – of Morrinsville. For services to agriculture and governance.
- Anthony Richard Egan – of Hamilton. For services to the agricultural industry and the community.
- Deborah Ann Espiner – of Remuera. For services to people with disabilities and education.
- Ian Donald Gardiner – of Christchurch. For services to the communications industry and mountain safety.
- Stewart Lloyd Germann – of St Heliers. For services to franchise law.
- Neville Charles Greenwood – of Christchurch. For services to the sheep industry.
- Judith Helen Hamilton – of Cambridge. For services to rowing.
- Richard Michael Arthur Harman – of Mount Cook. For services to journalism and broadcasting.
- Julie Anne Hart – of Hastings. For services to women and victims of family violence.
- Frances Margaret Hartnett – of Titirangi. For services to people with disabilities.
- Sandra Glenis Hazlehurst – of Havelock North. For services to local government.
- Te Warihi Kokowai Hetaraka – of Whangārei. For services to Māori and art.
- Jack Edward Hodder KC – of Kelburn. For services to the law.
- Shirley Gail Hooper – of Papamoa Beach. For services to netball and artistic swimming.
- Waihoroi Paraone Hoterene – of Kerikeri. For services to Māori and Māori language education.
- Lynley Elizabeth Lloyd – of Somerville. For services to renal nutrition.
- Andrew Webster Macfarlane – of Ashburton. For services to the deer industry
- Professor Roderick Duncan MacLeod MNZM – of Auckland. For services to palliative care.
- James Bruce Miller – of Remuera. For services to corporate governance.
- Lorraine Mary Moller – of Boulder, Colorado. For services to athletics.
- Professor Jens Helmut Friedrich Mueller – of Tauranga. For services to education.
- Suzanne Jane Porter – of New Plymouth. For services to the arts and event management.
- lain George Potter – of Kilbirnie. For services to sport and health.
- Tenby George Bolland Powell ED – of Tauranga. For services to business, governance and humanitarian aid.
- Karen Ritchie – of Pōkeno. For services to people with HIV/Aids and Rainbow communities.
- Cecilia Charlotte Louise Robinson – of Remuera. For services to business and women.
- Dr Mohammad Arif Saeid – of Mount Roskill. For services to refugees and youth.
- Valerie Christine Smith – of Nelson. For services to outdoor bowls.
- Paul Bertram Wright – of Ilam. For services to the real estate industry and philanthropy.
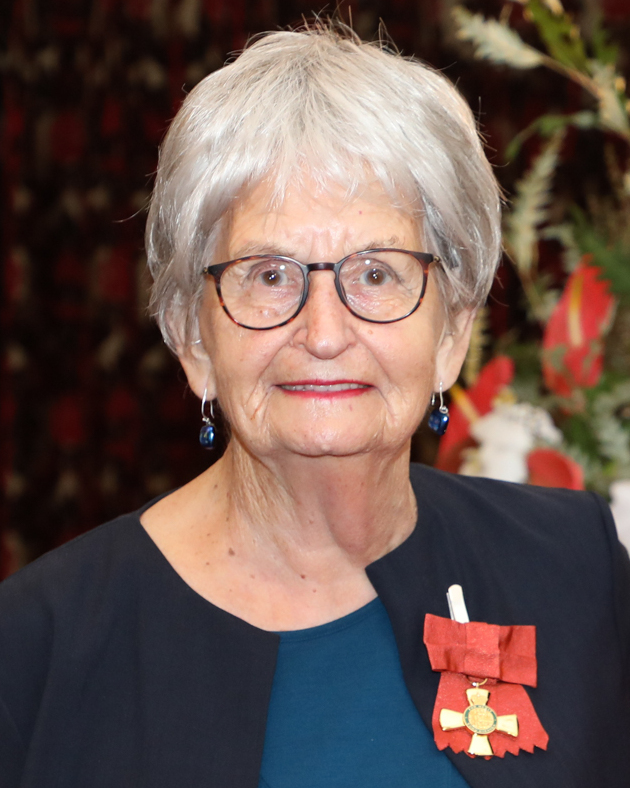
Patricia Allan

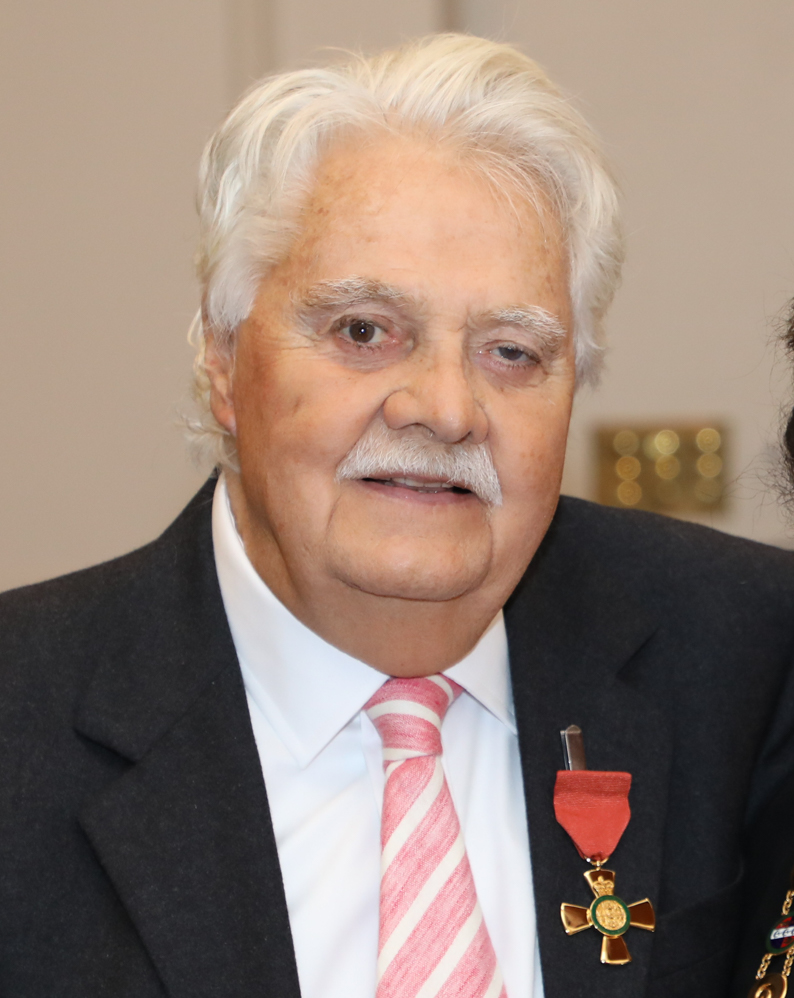
Graham Carr

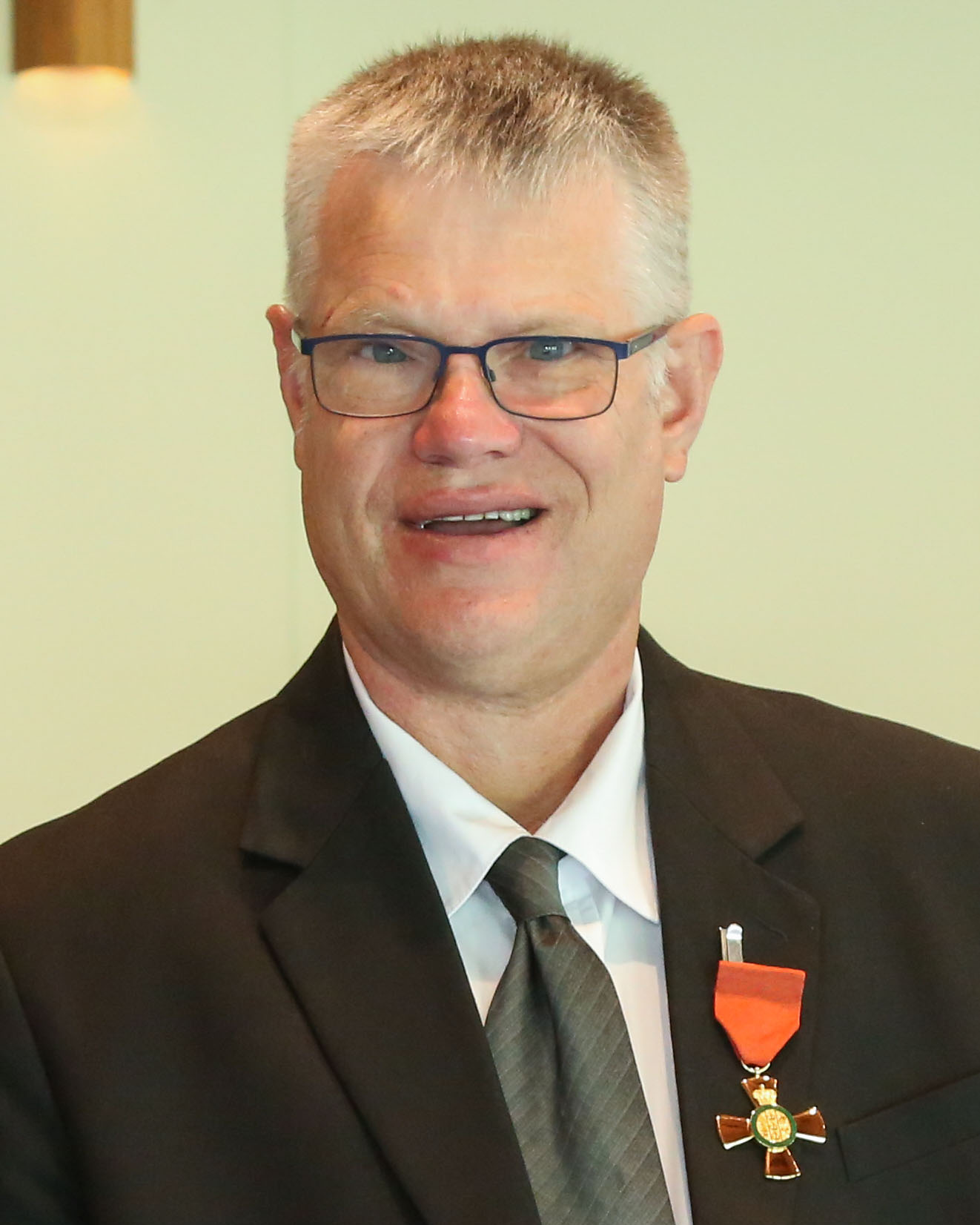
David Corner

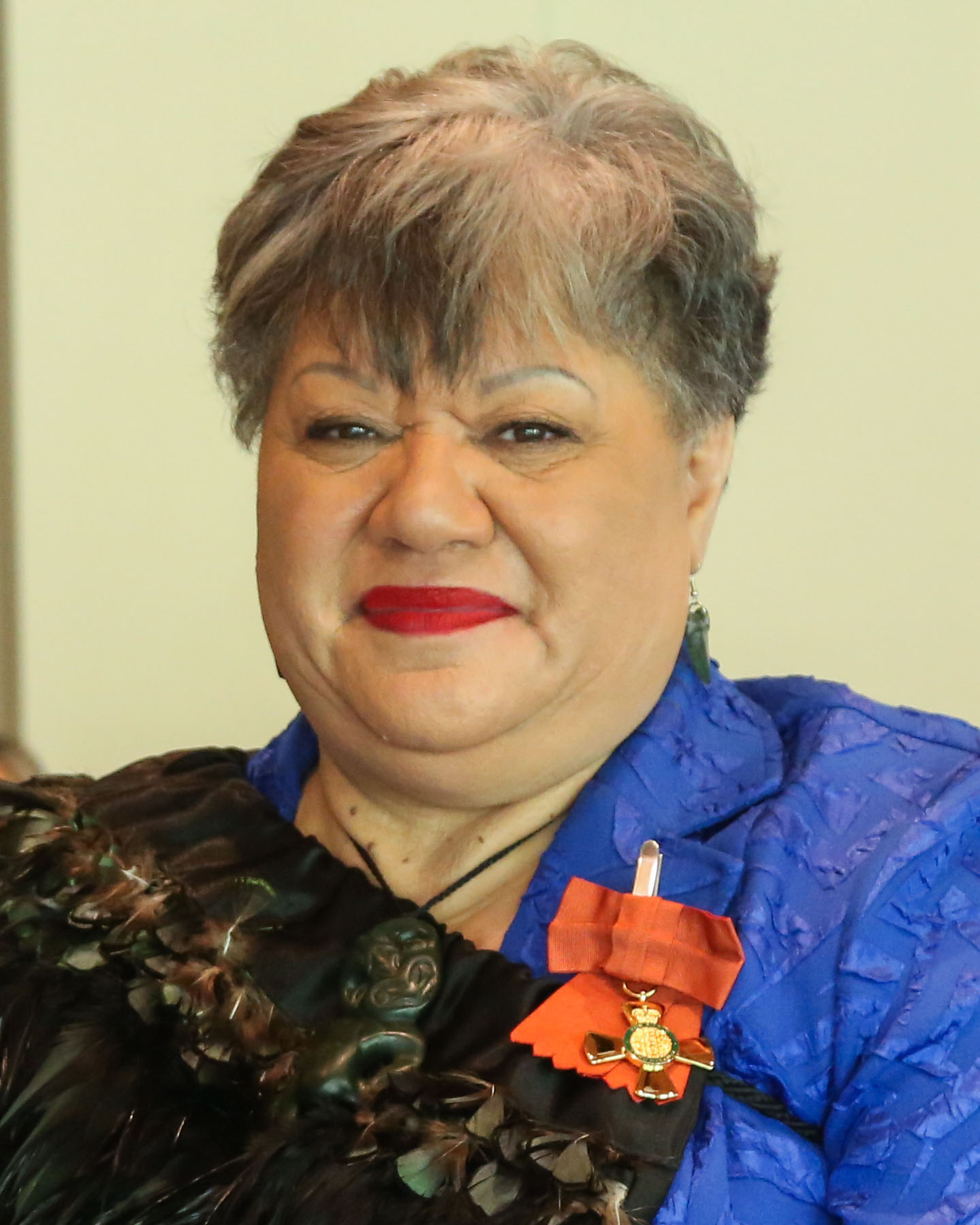
Chrissie Cowan

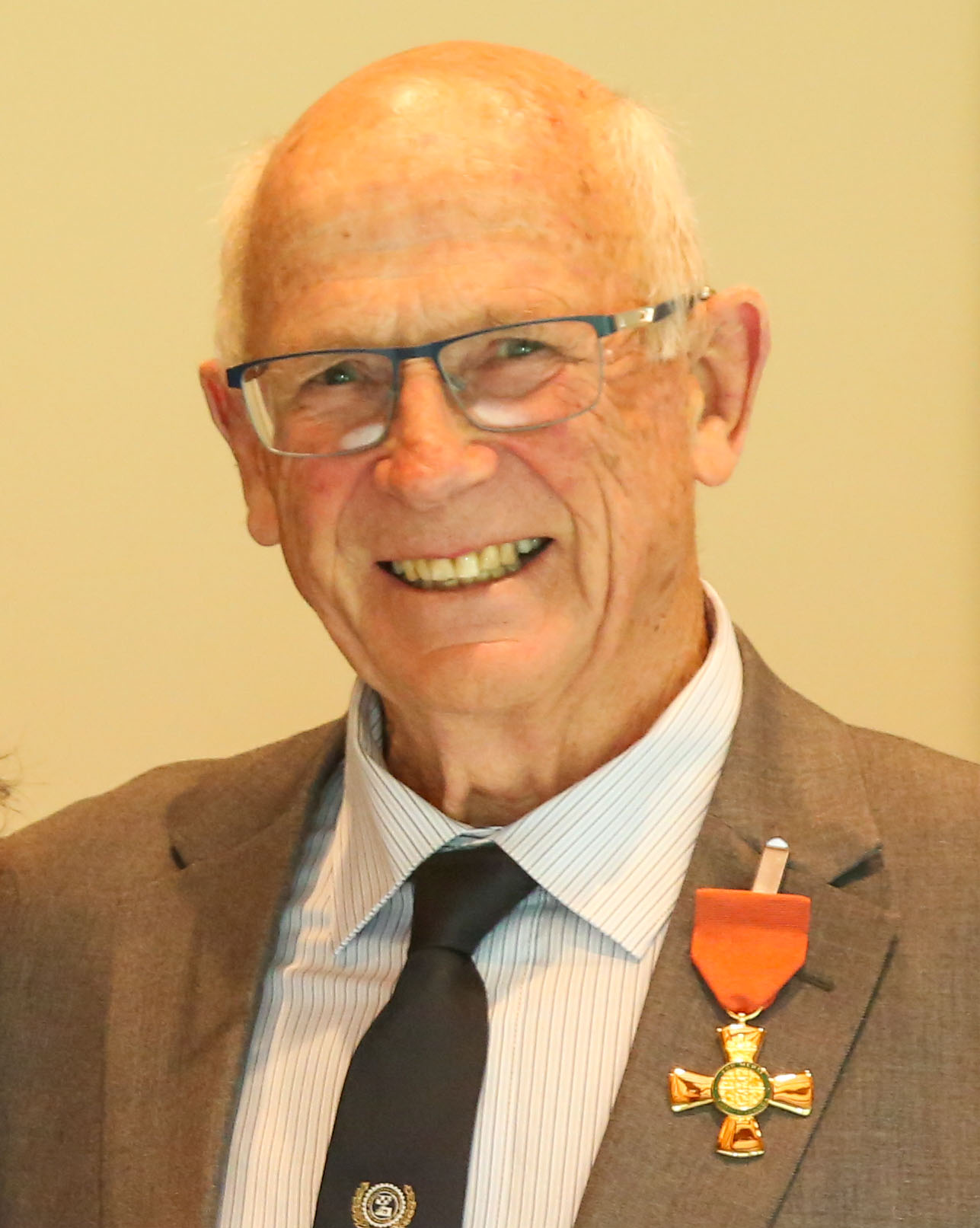
Brian Davies

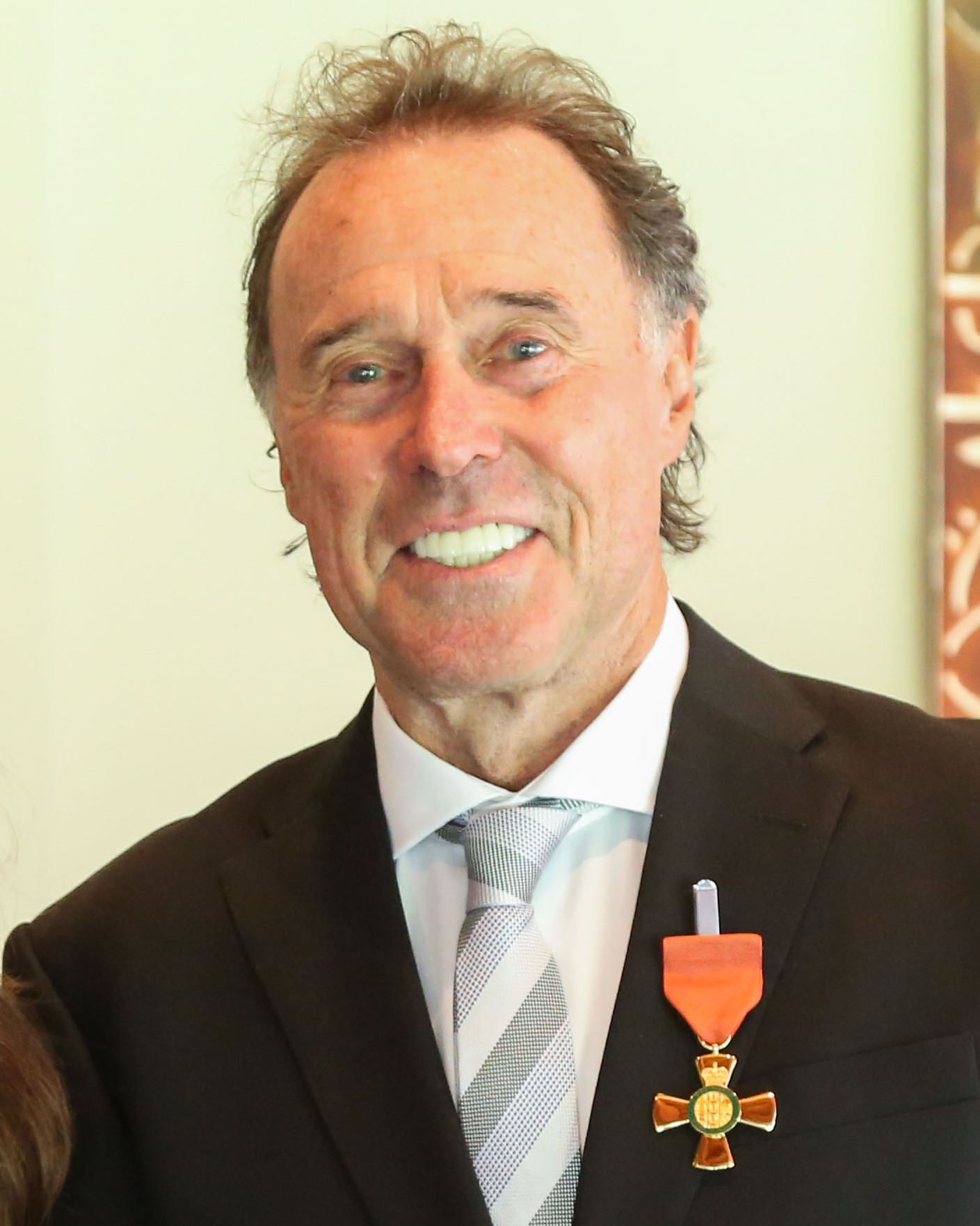
Rod Dixon

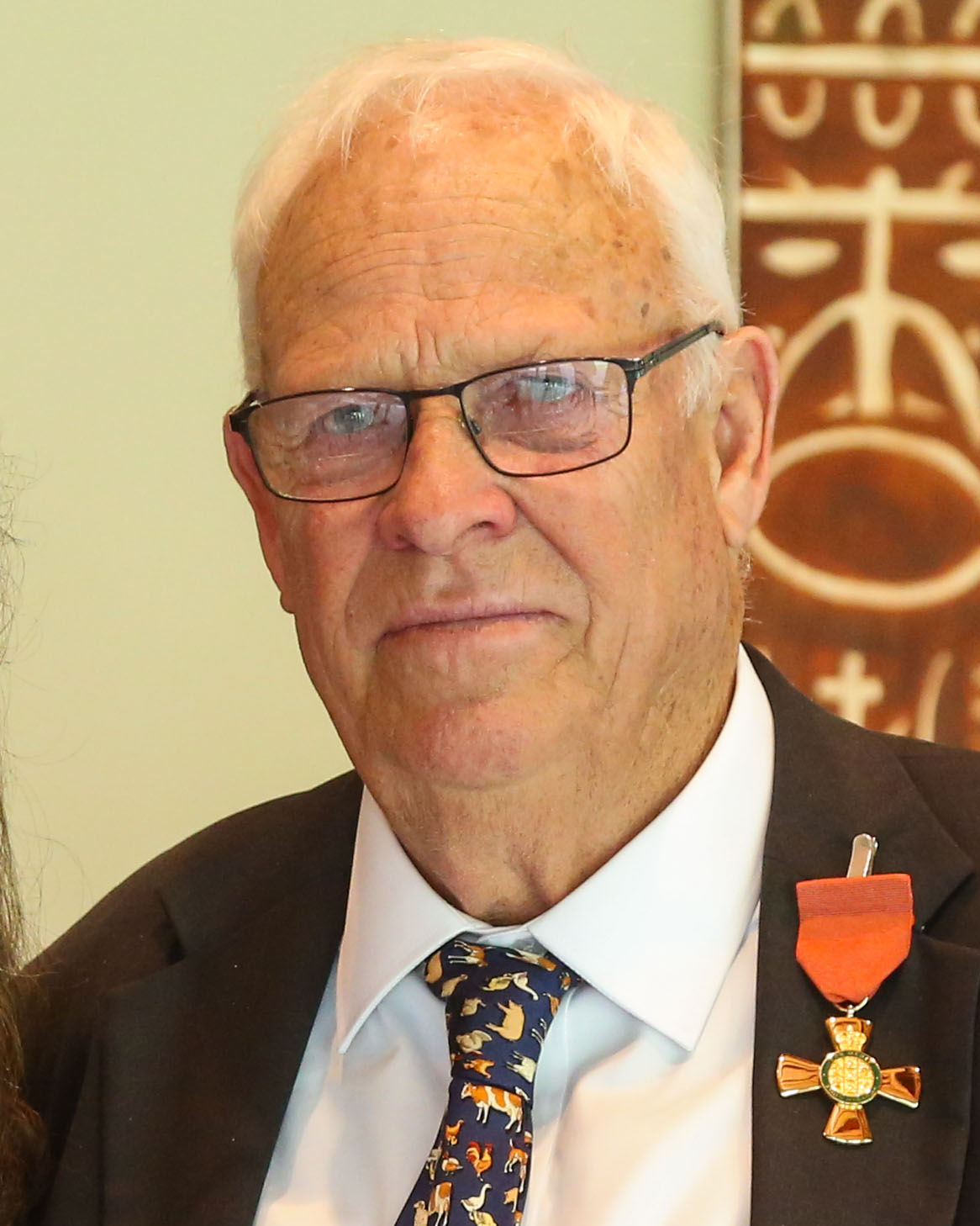
Lloyd Downing

Tony Egan

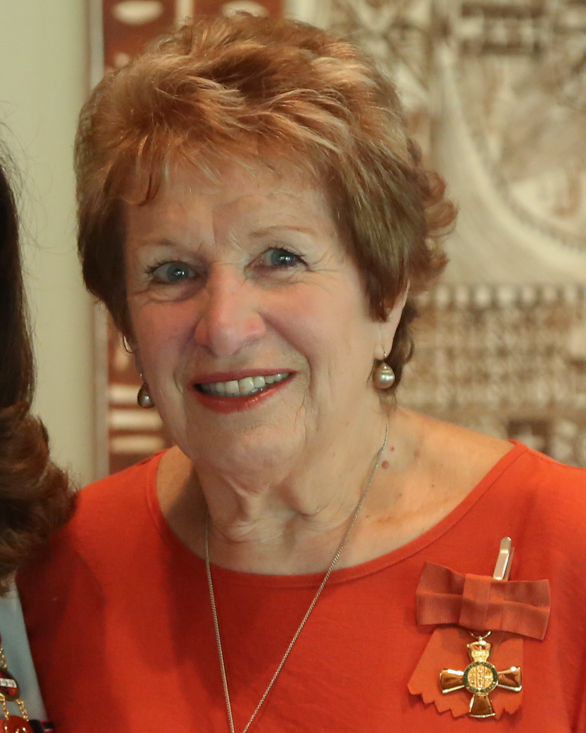
Deborah Espiner

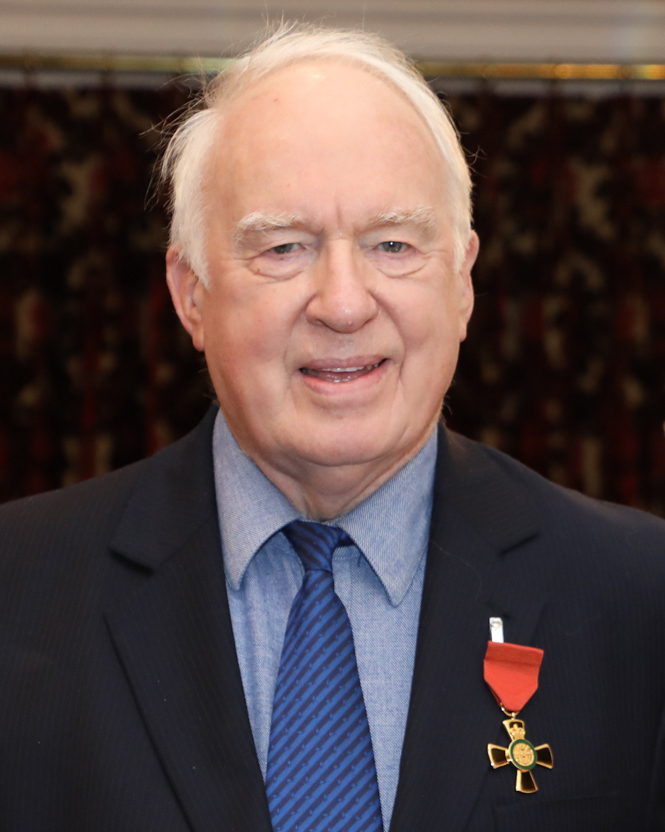
Ian Gardiner

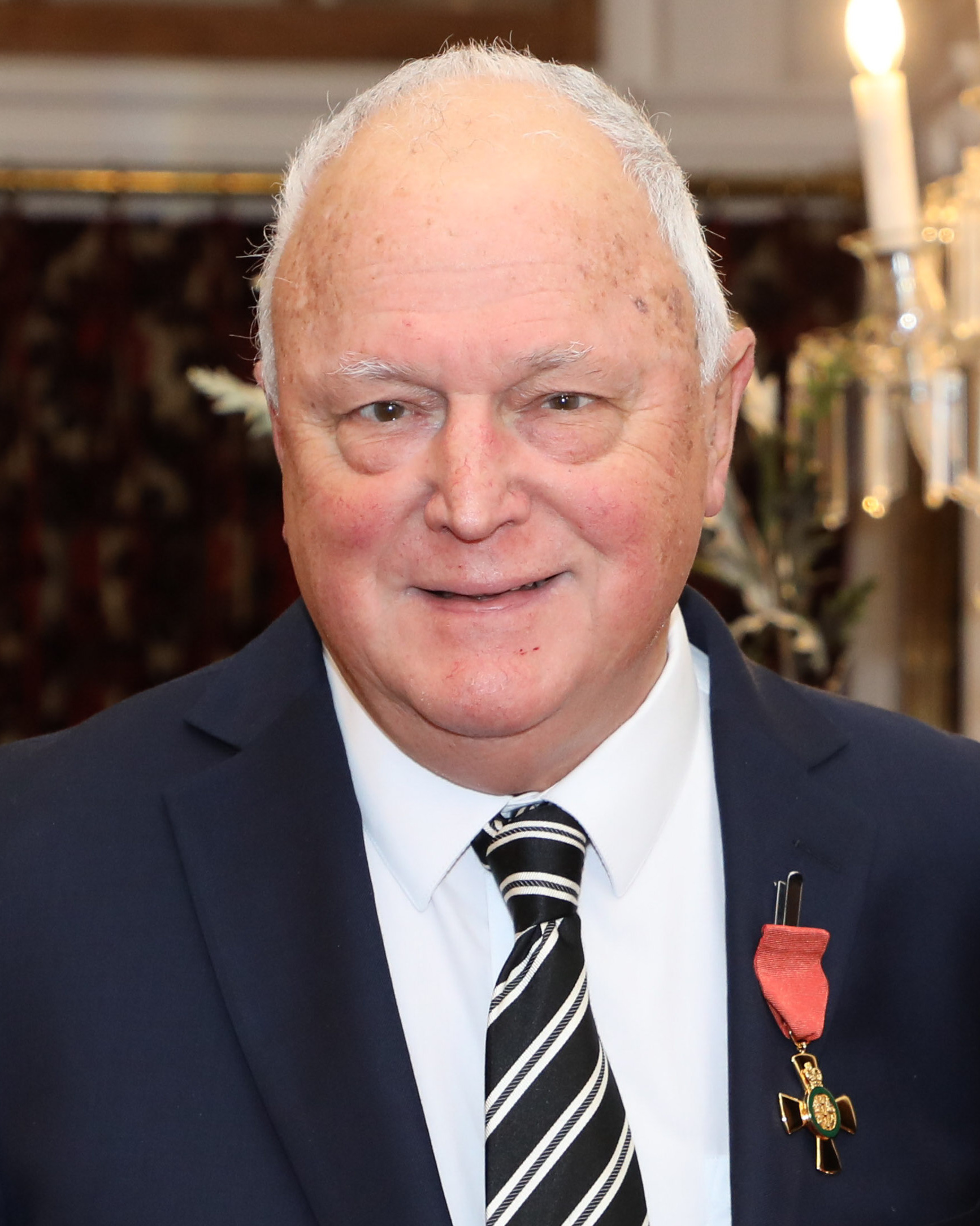
Stewart Germann

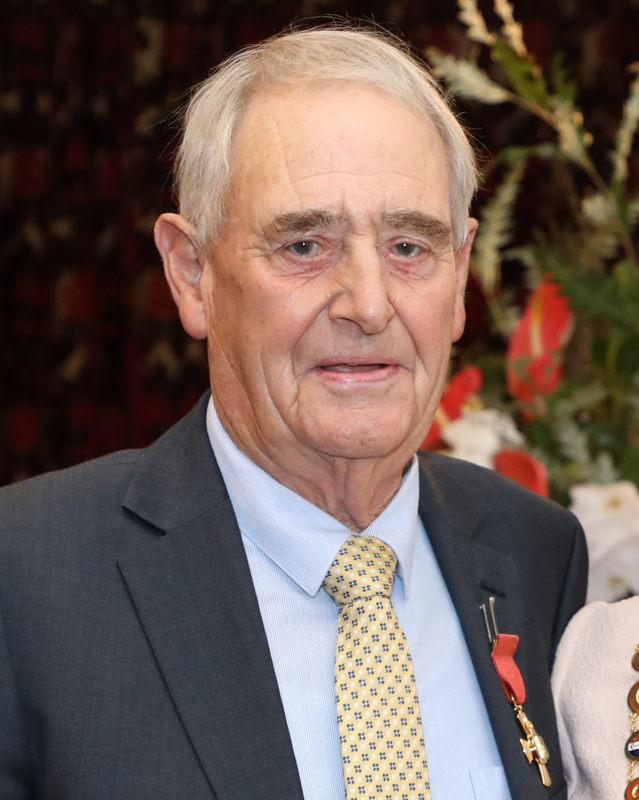
Neville Greenwood

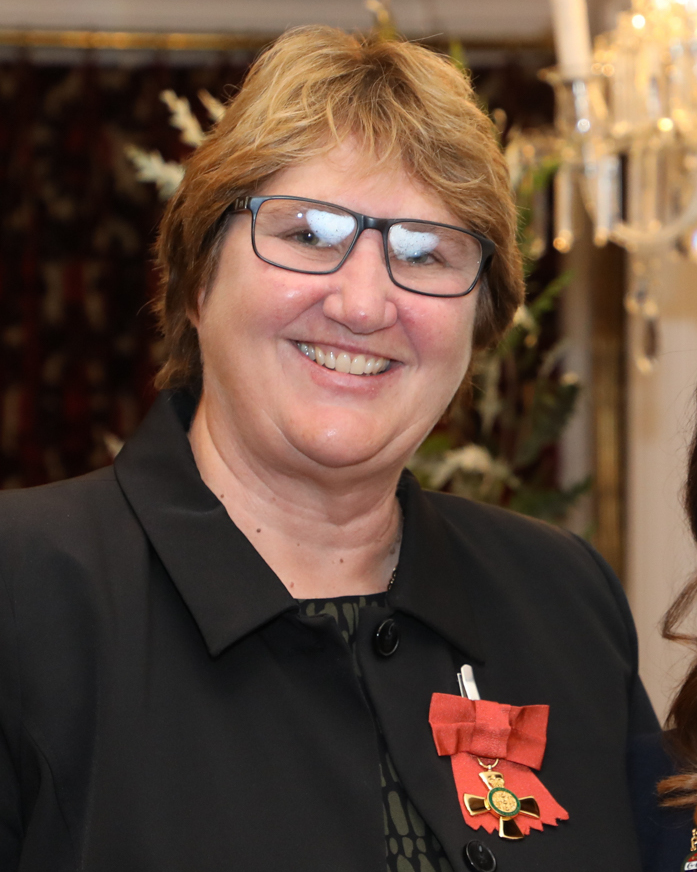
Judith Hamilton

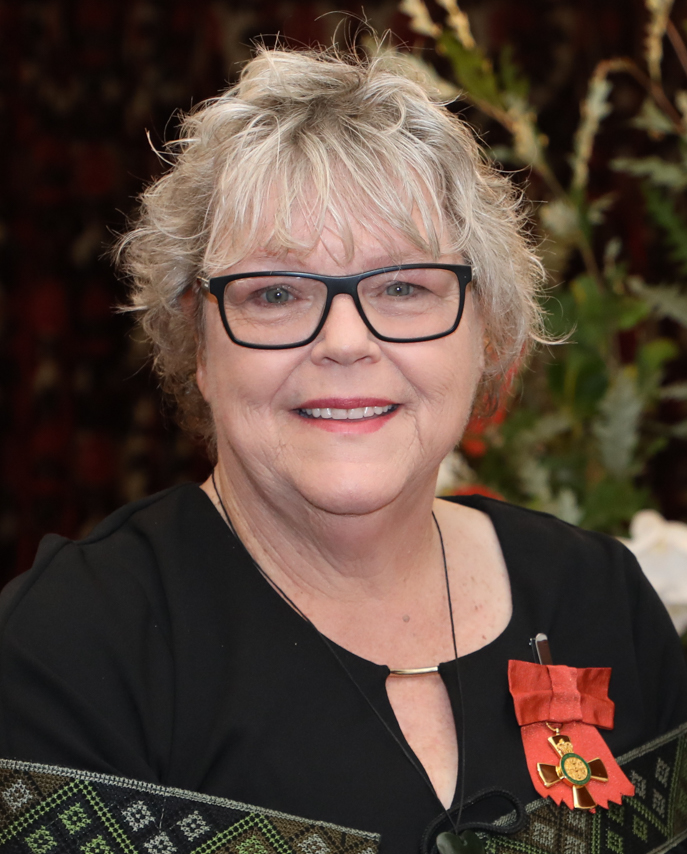
Julie Hart

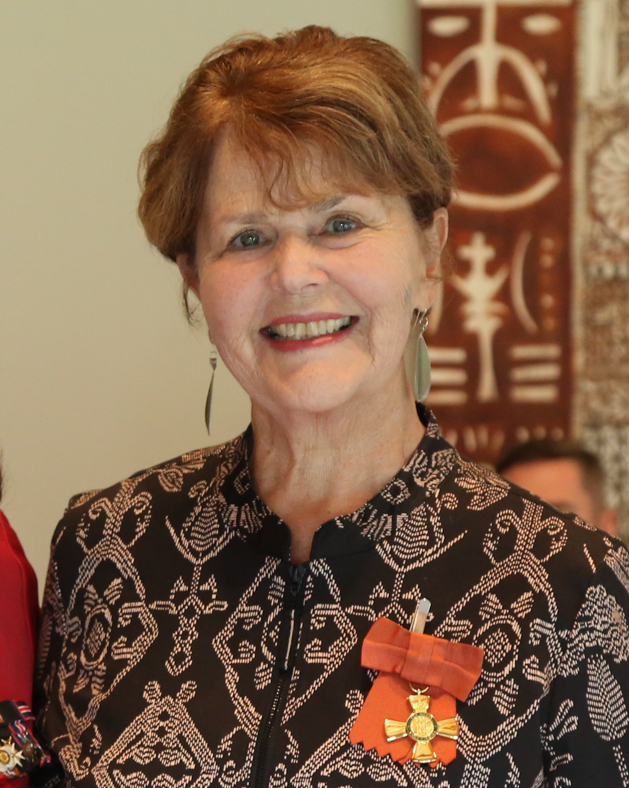
Fran Hartnett

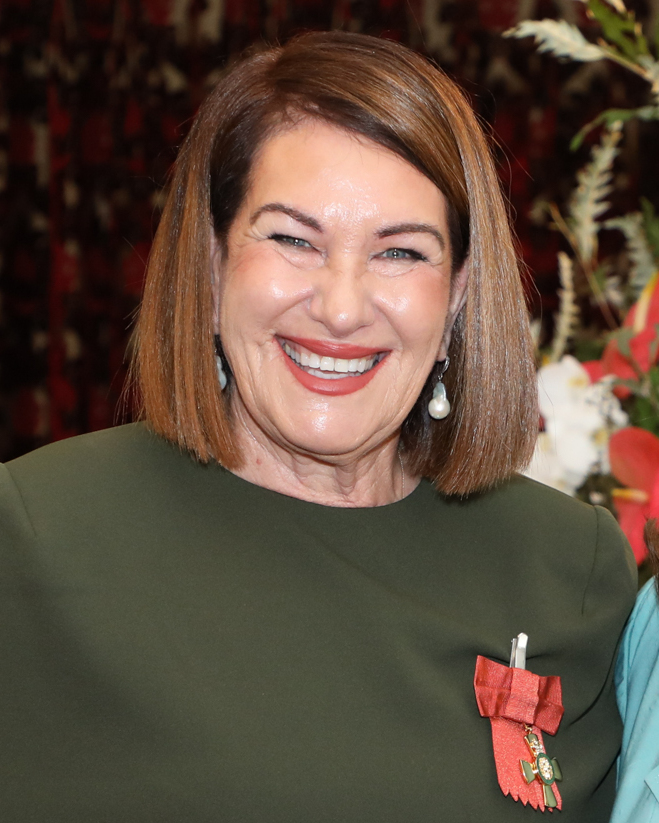
Sandra Hazlehurst

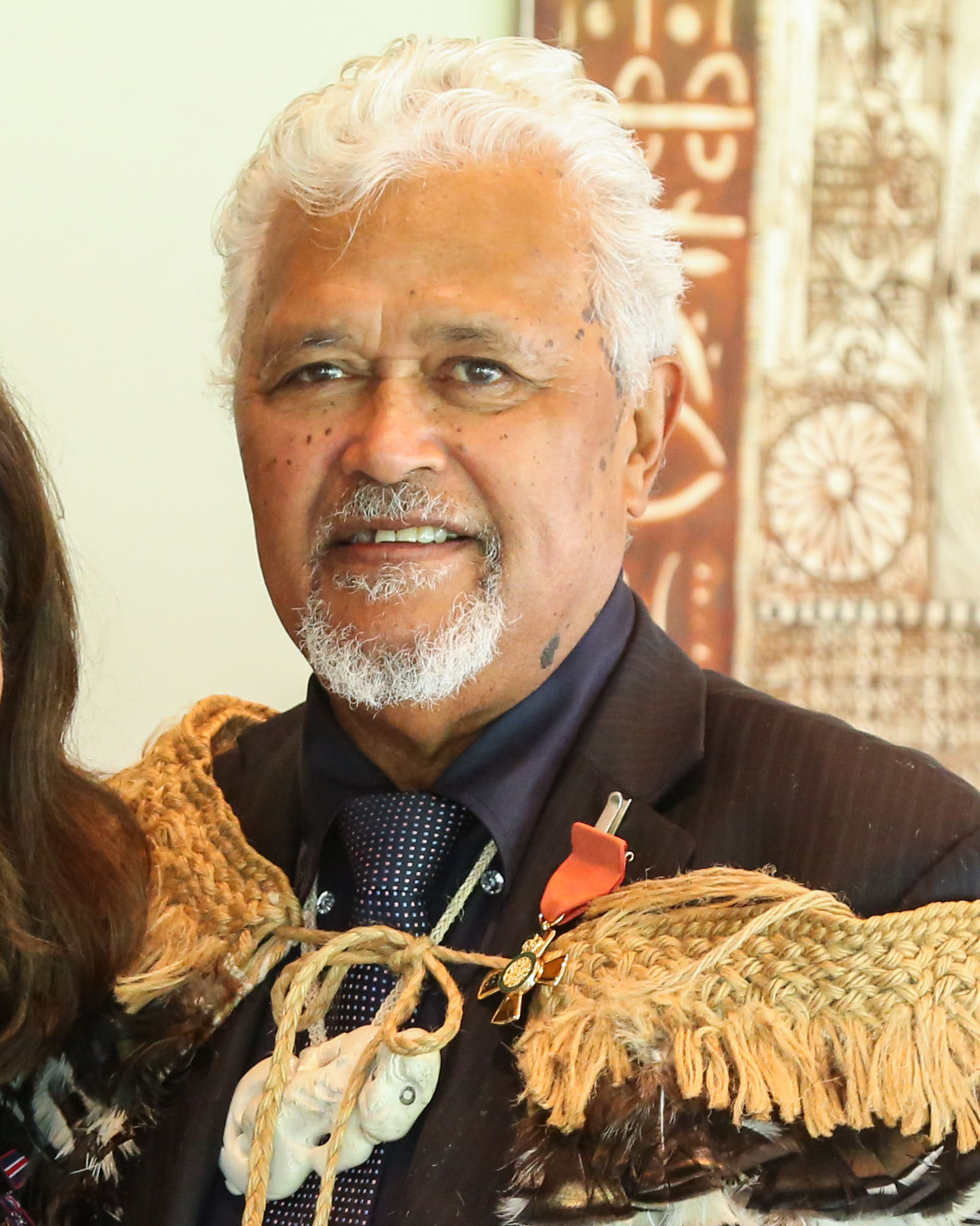
Te Warihi Hetaraka

Jack Hodder

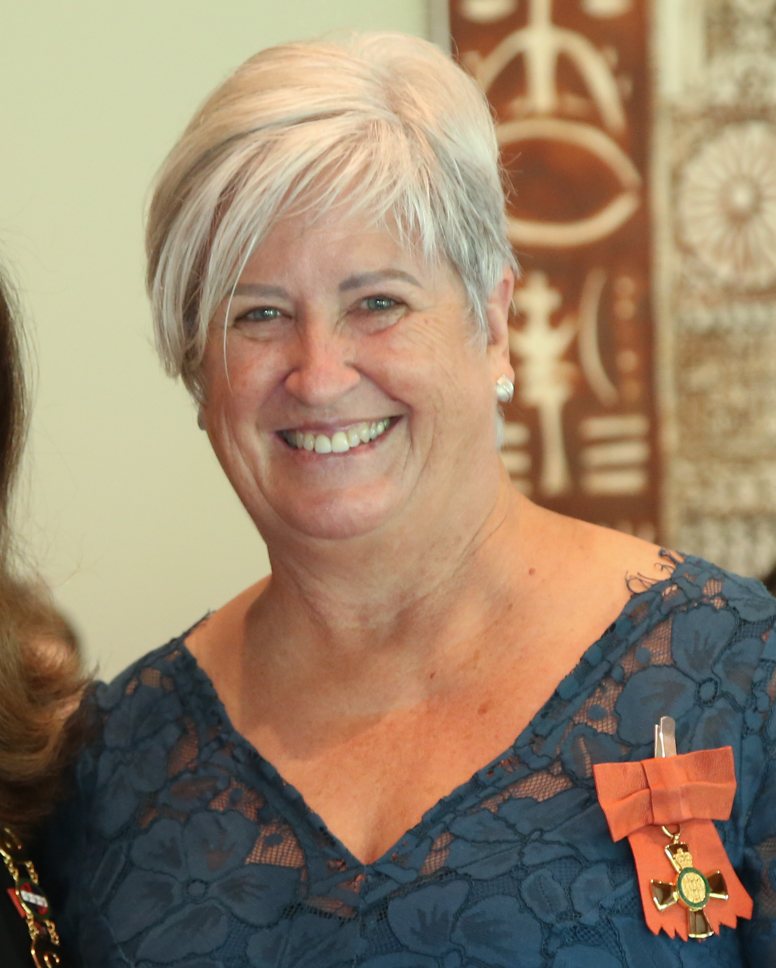
Shirley Hooper

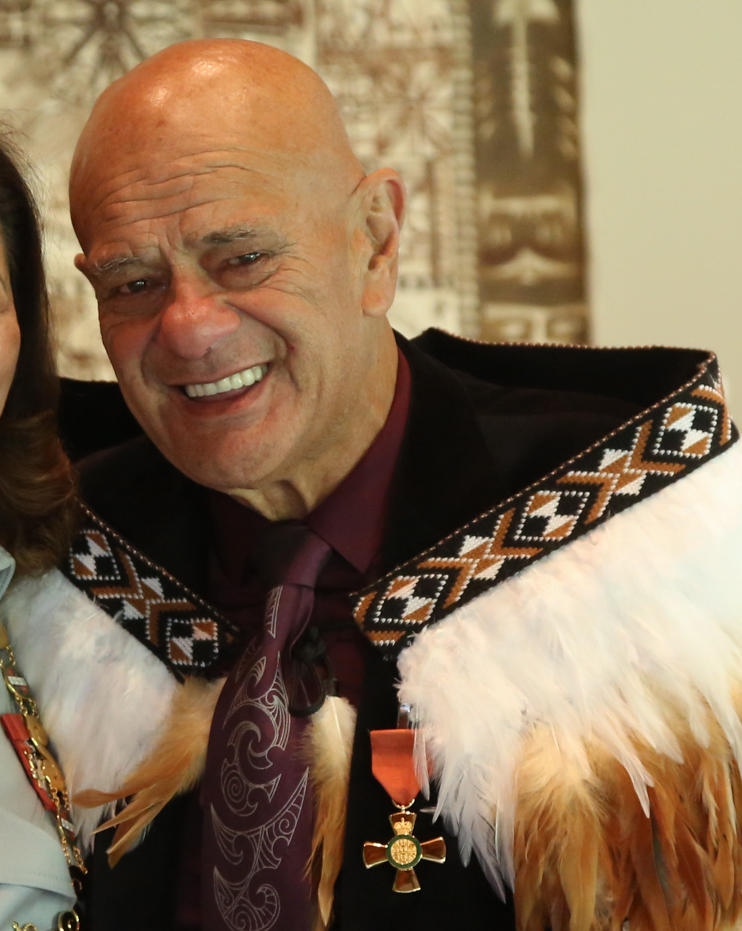
Waihoroi Hoterene

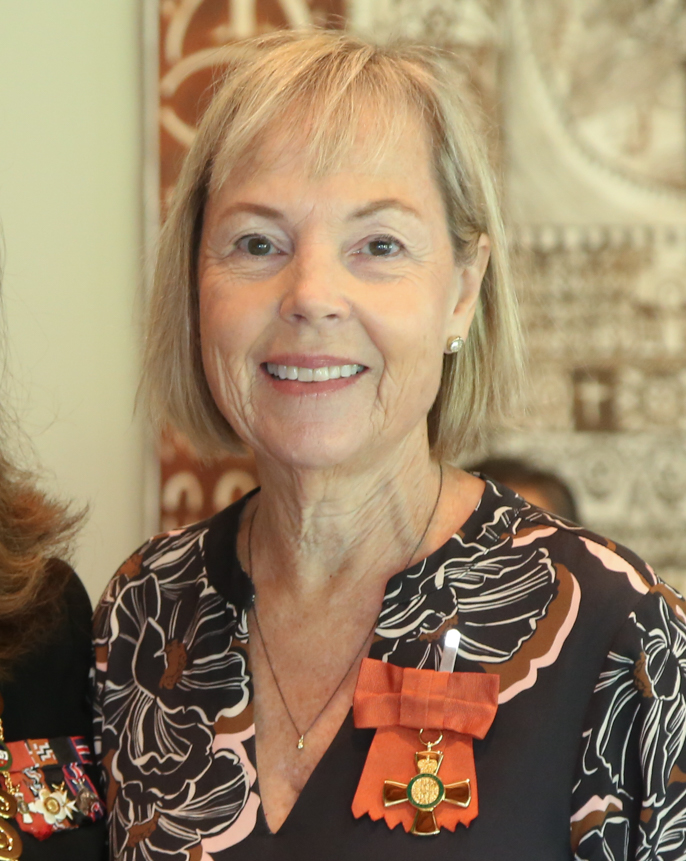
Lyn Lloyd

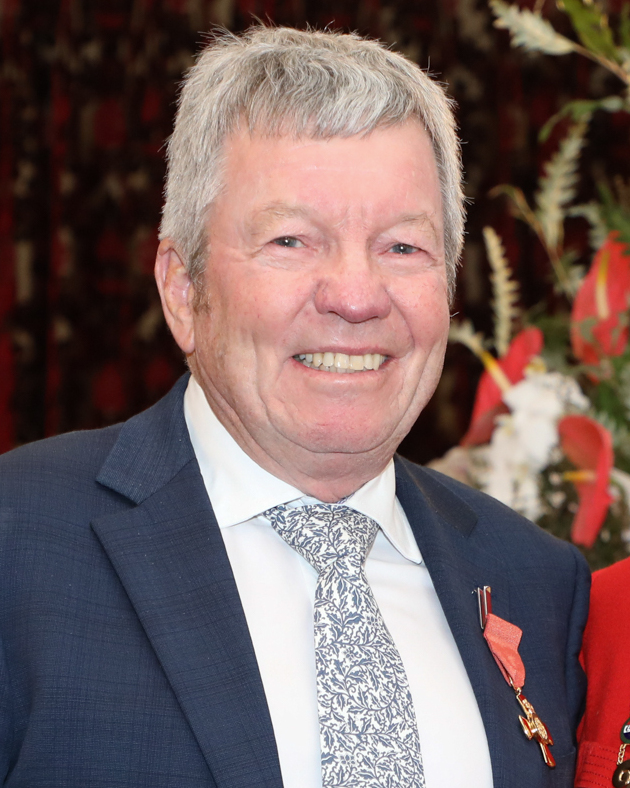
Andy Macfarlane

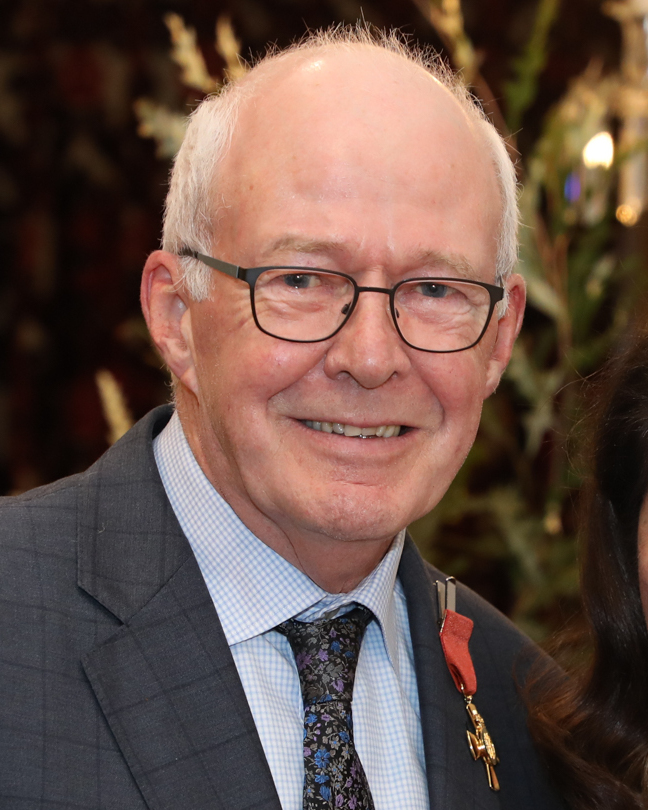
Rod MacLeod

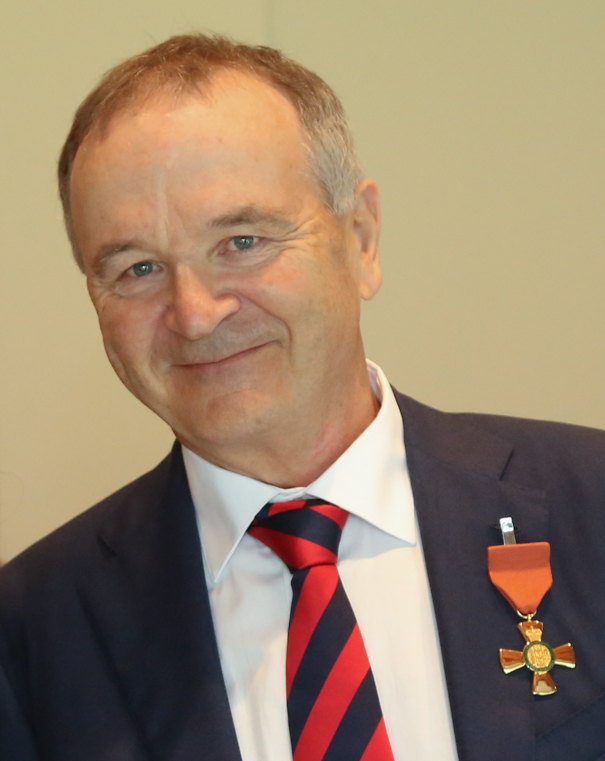
James Miller

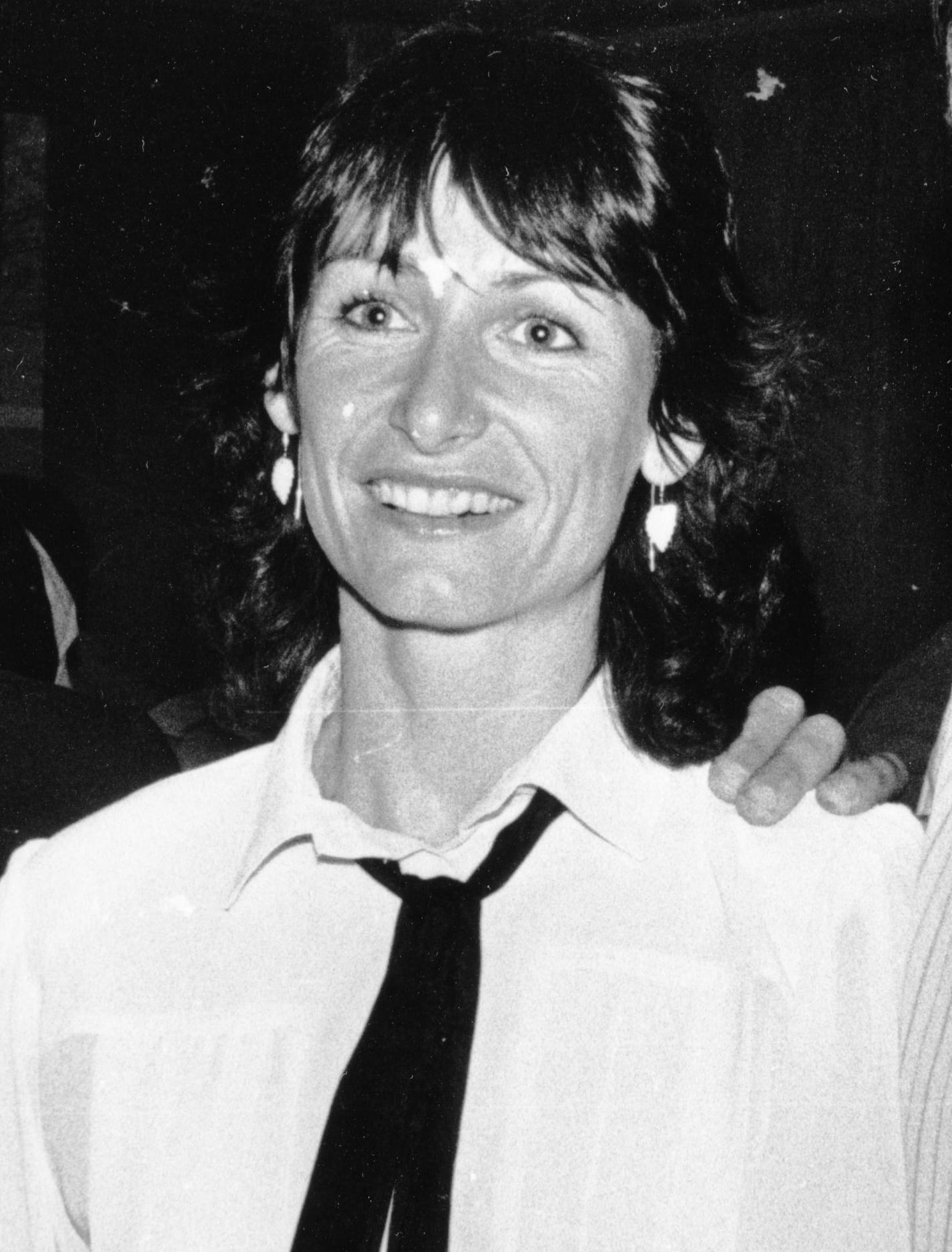
Lorraine Moller

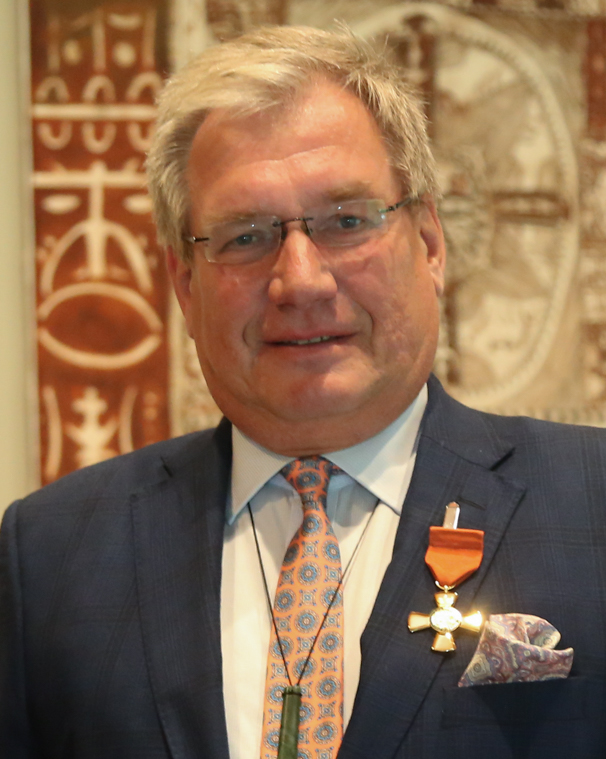
Jens Mueller

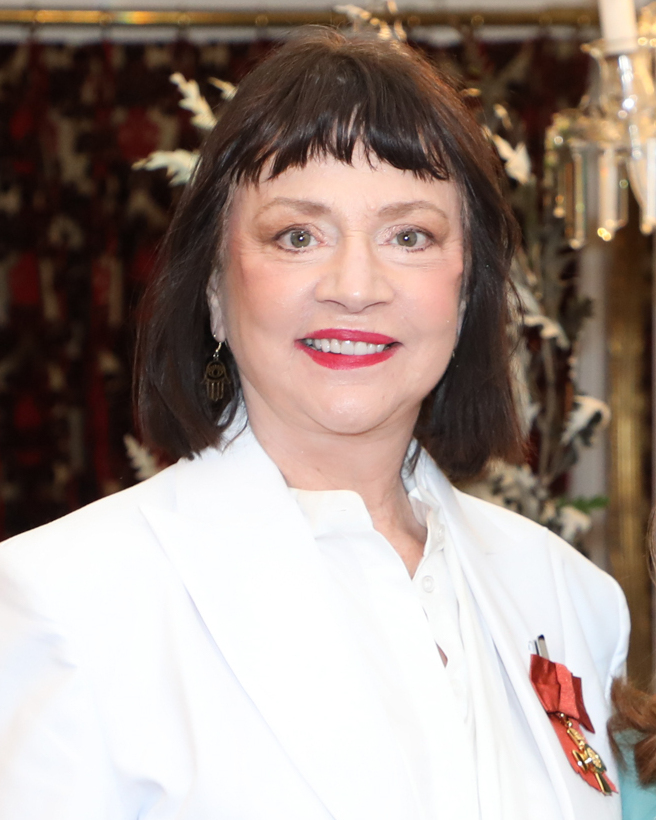
Suzanne Porter

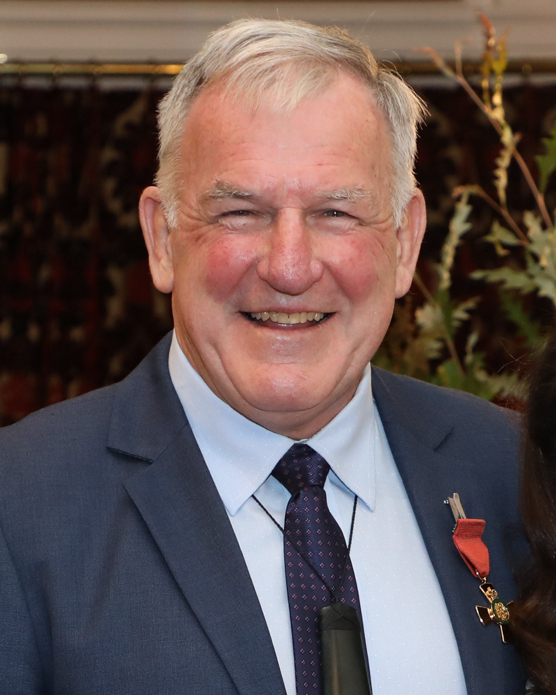
Iain Potter

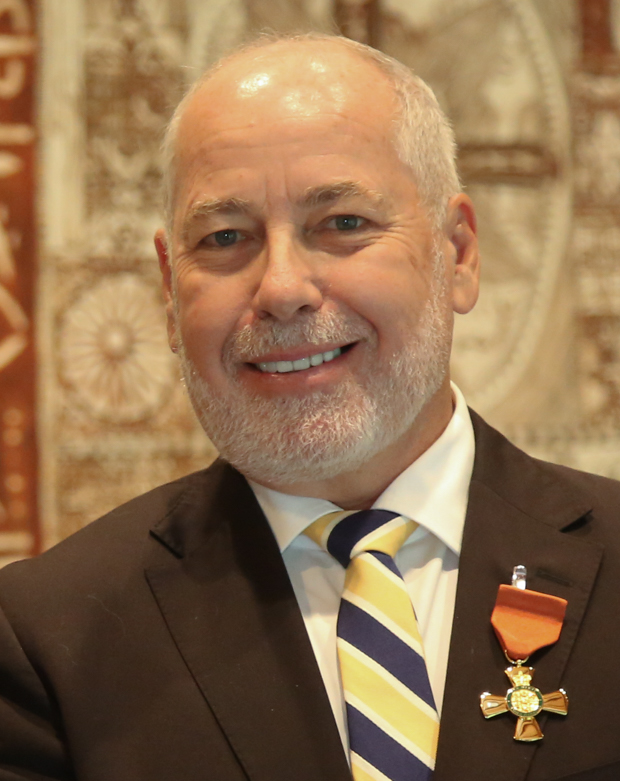
Tenby Powell

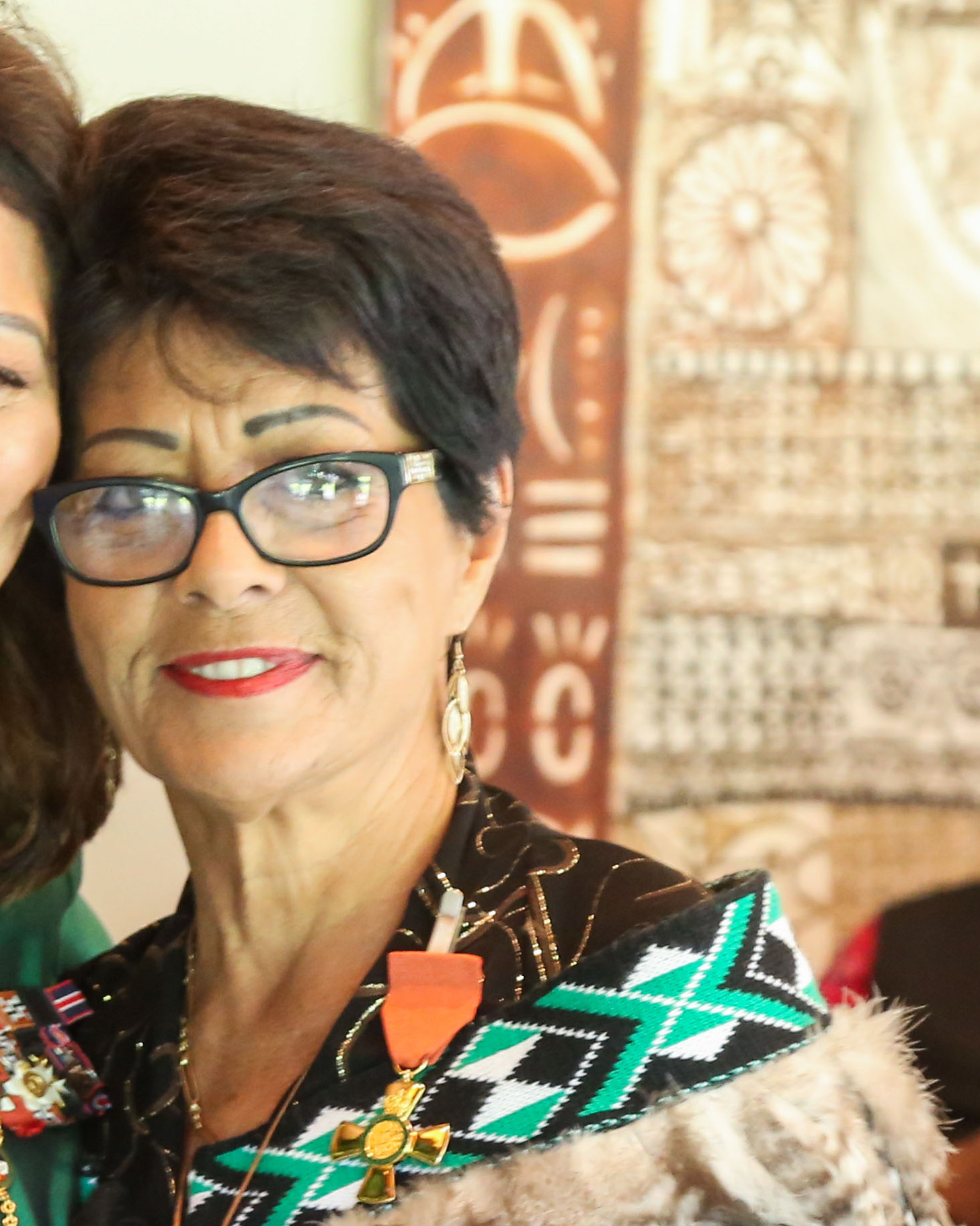
Karen Ritchie

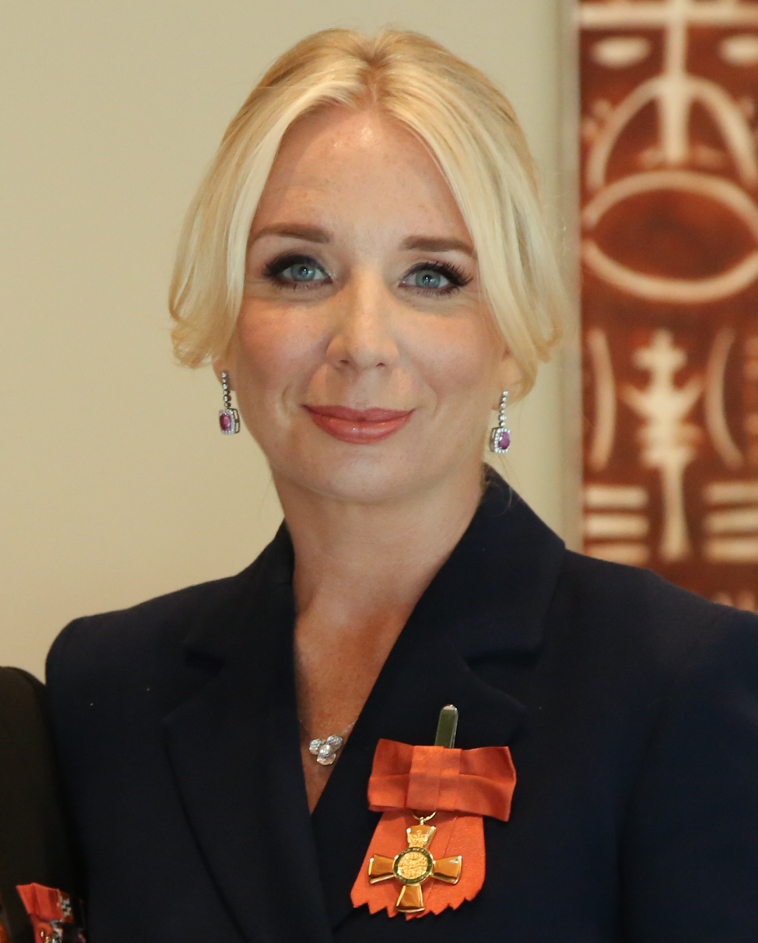
Cecilia Robinson

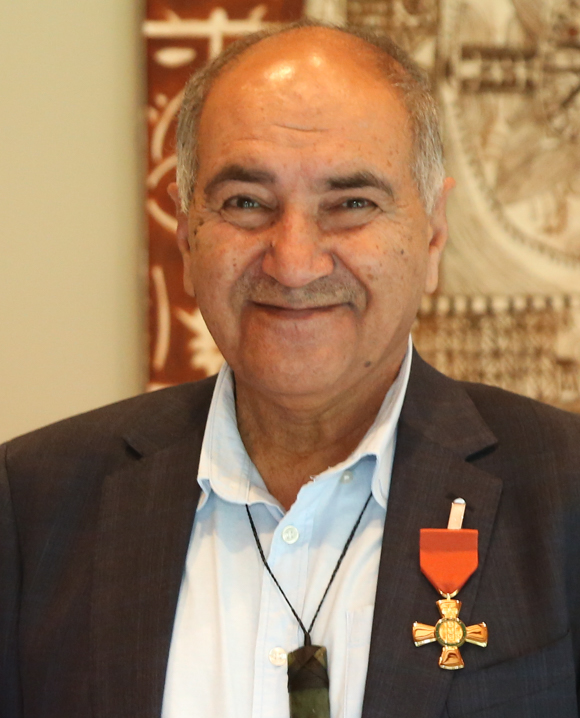
Arif Saeid

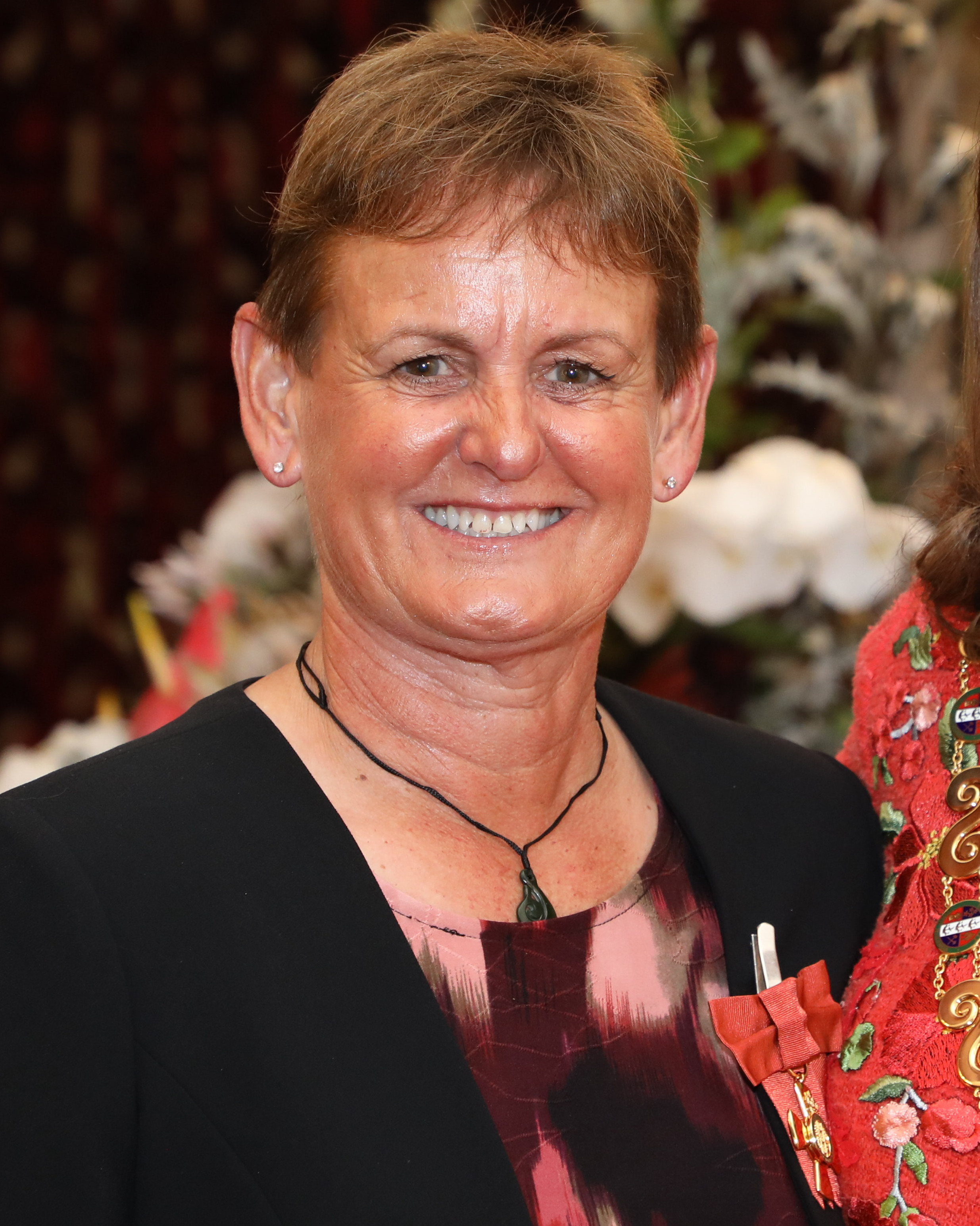
Val Smith

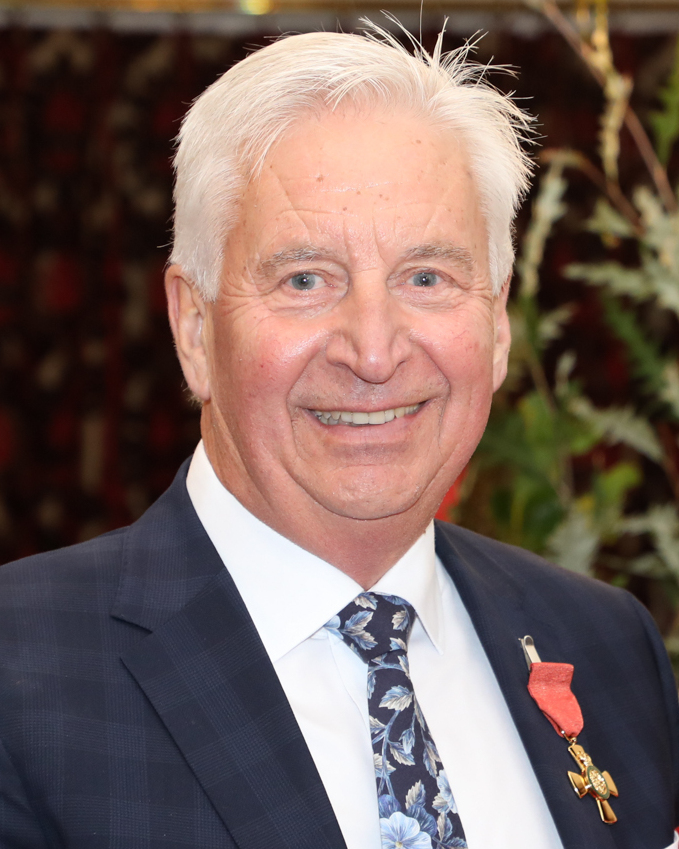
Paul Wright

=== Member (MNZM) ===
- Kevin John Burgess – of Karapiro. For services to governance, the community and sport.
- Donna Elise Chisholm – of One Tree Hill. For services to journalism.
- Eroni Clarke – of Henderson. For services to the Pacific community and rugby.
- Peter John Cullen – of Oriental Bay. For services to law, governance and youth.
- Rosemary Helen Dixon – of Karori. For services to schools debating.
- Roger Bruce Douglas Drummond – of Hataitai. For services to rugby and Māori.
- Robyn Ann Dynes – of Fendalton. For services to agricultural science.
- Lorraine Shirley Eade – of Blenheim. For services to Māori, governance and the community.
- Judene Louise Edgar JP – of Nelson. For services to governance, local government and the community.
- Jane Frances Eynon-Richards JP – of Rotorua. For services to the community.
- Jade Carlo Farrar – of Auckland Central. For services to people with disabilities and the Pacific community.
- Beverley Riverina Forrester – of Amberley. For services to the wool and fashion industries.
- Deborah Kaye Fraser – of Tainui. For services to mental health and youth.
- Donald George Geddes – of Ashburton. For services to Fire and Emergency New Zealand, Land Search and Rescue and the community.
- Malcolm John Gillies – of Upper Hutt. For services to business.
- Martin James Guptill – of Auckland. For services to cricket.
- Martin John Hadlee – of Northwood. For services to the community.
- Janine Michelle Harrington – of Christchurch. For services to education.
- David John Harrison – of Khandallah. For services to the insurance industry and the community.
- John Gordon Hobbs – of Pukekohe. For services to horticulture.
- Susan Hobbs – of Silverdale. For services to people with disabilities.
- Gerald Anthony Hope – of Blenheim. For services to local government, business and the community.
- Kāren Eirene Johansen JP – of Gisborne. For services to education and human rights.
- Richard William Kennett JP – of Glenorchy. For services to conservation and Search and Rescue.
- Jillian Anne Kerr – of Diamond Harbour. For services to choral music and music education.
- Dr Murray Alexander King – of Wadestown. For services to transport, logistics and railway heritage.
- Mark Henri Limacher – of Khandallah. For services as a restaurateur and to the hospitality industry.
- Professor Tracie Ailong Mafile'o – of Palmerston North. For services to Pacific and tertiary education.
- Terence Ronald Maskell – of Onehunga. For services to choral music.
- Nichola Rosemary McArthur – of Kaikōura. For services to conservation and the community.
- Malcolm lan McKee – of Gore. For services to sport.
- Dawn Mary McMillan – of Thames. For services to children's literature.
- Katharine Eleanor Milford – of Tauranga. For services to people with aphasia.
- Jennifer Louise Nahu – of Rotorua. For services to rugby league.
- Vivien Lewanna Napier JP – of Greytown. For services to local government and the community.
- Dr Stephen John Neville – of Alexandra Headland, Queensland. For services to gerontology research and seniors.
- Kevin Nielsen – of New Plymouth. For services to the community and people with disabilities.
- Dr Caroline Ann Oliver – of Wānaka. For services to cancer research and the community.
- Hori Te Moanaroa Parata – of Onerahi. For services to conservation and Māori.
- Alexandra Anne Pasley – of Northcote Point. For services to education.
- David Stephen Pluck – of Nelson. For services to education.
- Andrew Ruawhitu Pokaia – of Bishopdale. For services to Māori and education.
- Gaye Annette Poole – of Chartwell. For services to the performing arts and education.
- Ian Douglas Poulter – of Kaiapoi. For services to education.
- Ravinder Singh Powar JP – of Harrowfield. For services to ethnic communities.
- John Dempster Robinson – of Pukekohe. For services to orienteering.
- Valerie Jean Robinson – of Pukekohe. For services to orienteering.
- John Francis Roughan – of Campbells Bay. For services to journalism and the community.
- Dr Fahima Saeid – of Mount Roskill. For services to refugees.
- Bruce Douglas Shalders – of Redwood. For services to railway heritage.
- Leighton Irwin Smith – of Waiake. For services to broadcasting
- Mokafetu (Matafetu) Smith – of Henderson. For services to Pacific art.
- Arihia Amiria Stirling QSM JP – of Clendon Park. For services to education and Māori.
- Professor Andrew Peter Stockley – of Wotton Underwood, Buckinghamshire, England. For services to schools debating.
- Dr Audrey Melanie Tan – of Christchurch. For services to mathematics education.
- Gail Henrietta Maria Thompson – of Bluff. For services to Māori and conservation.
- Helena Audrey Tuteao – of Rototuna. For services to people with disabilities and Māori.
- Senior Constable Grant William Watts – of Palmerston North. For services to the New Zealand Police and youth.
- William lan Welch – of Porirua. For services to rail heritage.
- Elizabeth Robyn Whiting – of Epsom. For services to costume design.
- Gary Selwyn Whittle – of Burswood. For services to rugby league.
- Sarah Jane Wickens – of Wadestown. For services to business.
- Shirley Jane Zintl – of Tītahi Bay. For services to youth.
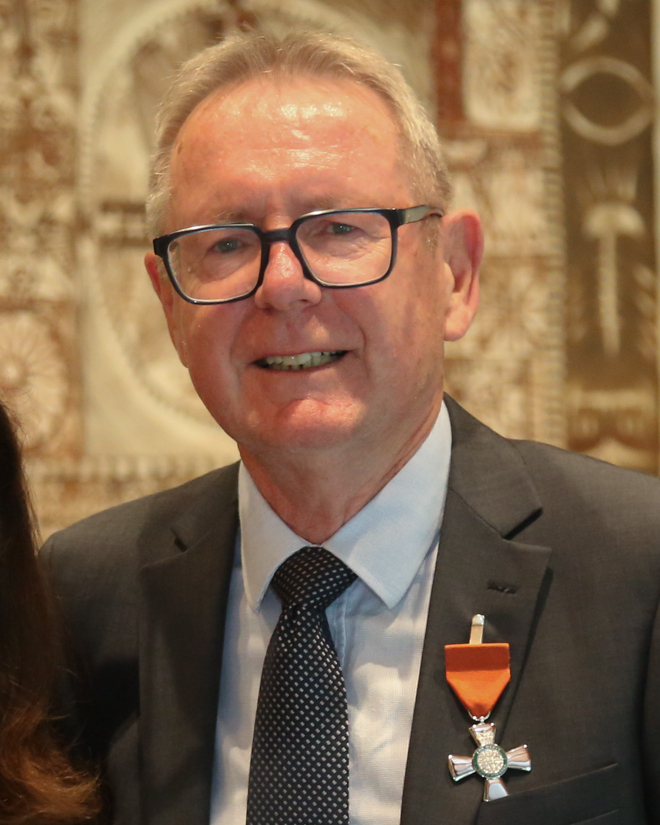
Kevin Burgess

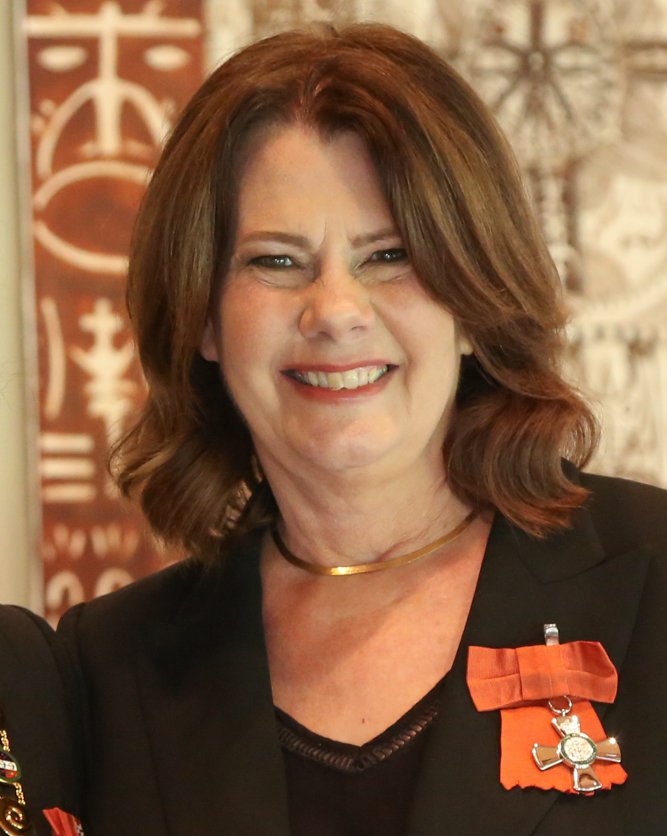
Donna Chisholm

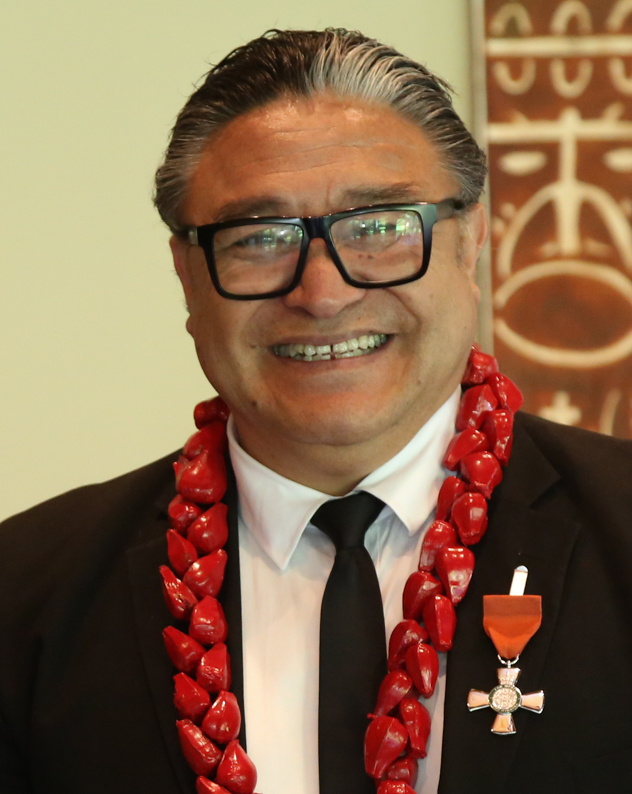
Eroni Clarke

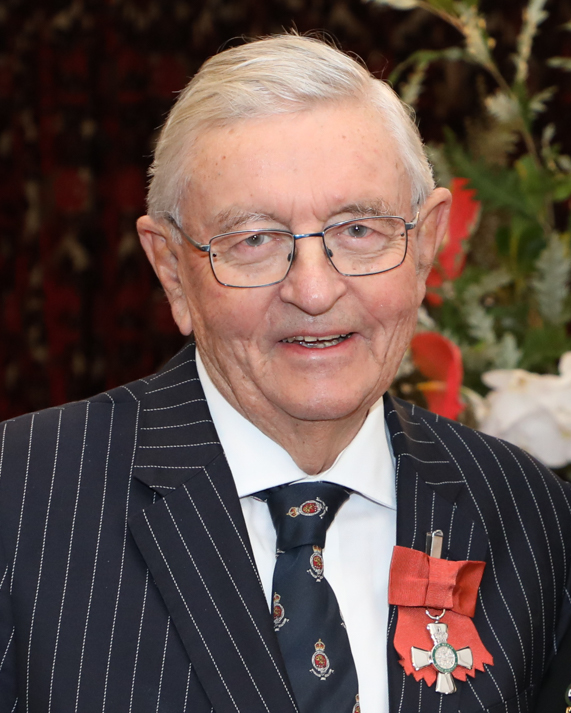
Peter Cullen

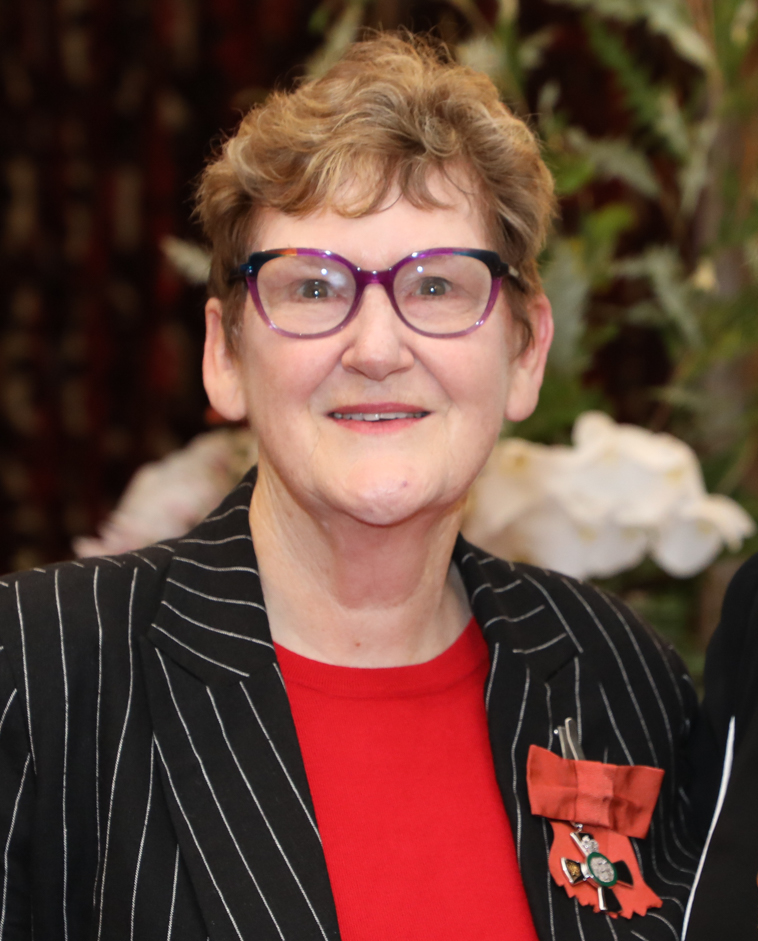
Rosemary Dixon

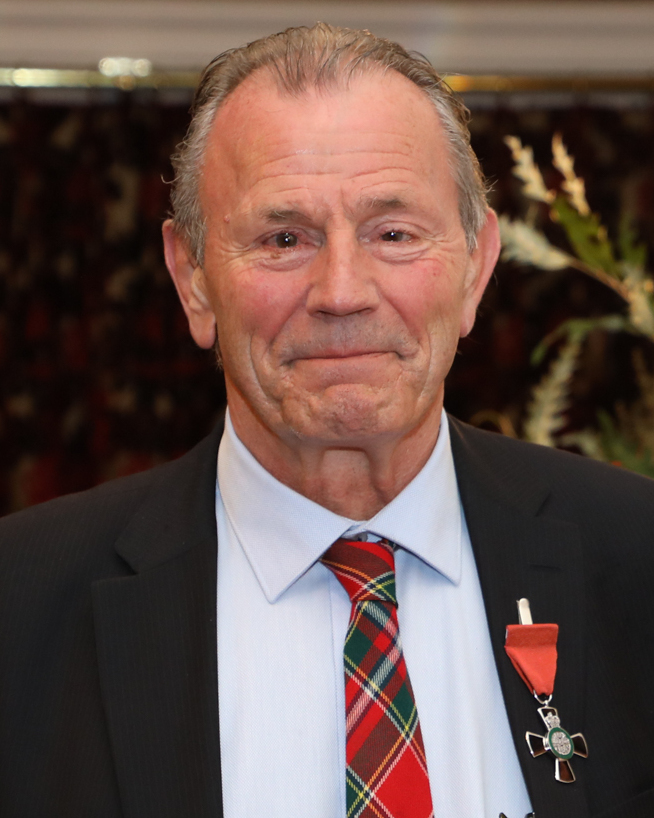
Roger Drummond

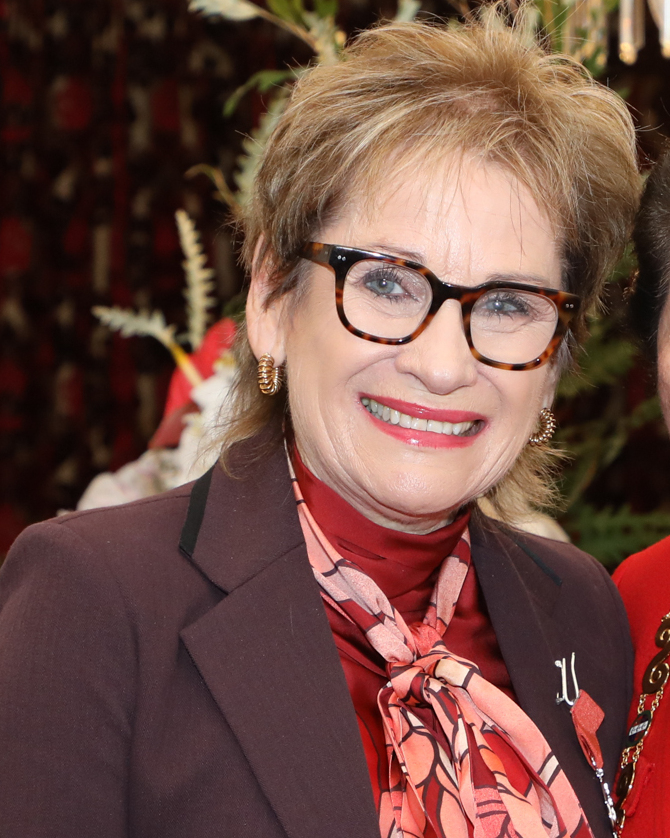
Robyn Dynes

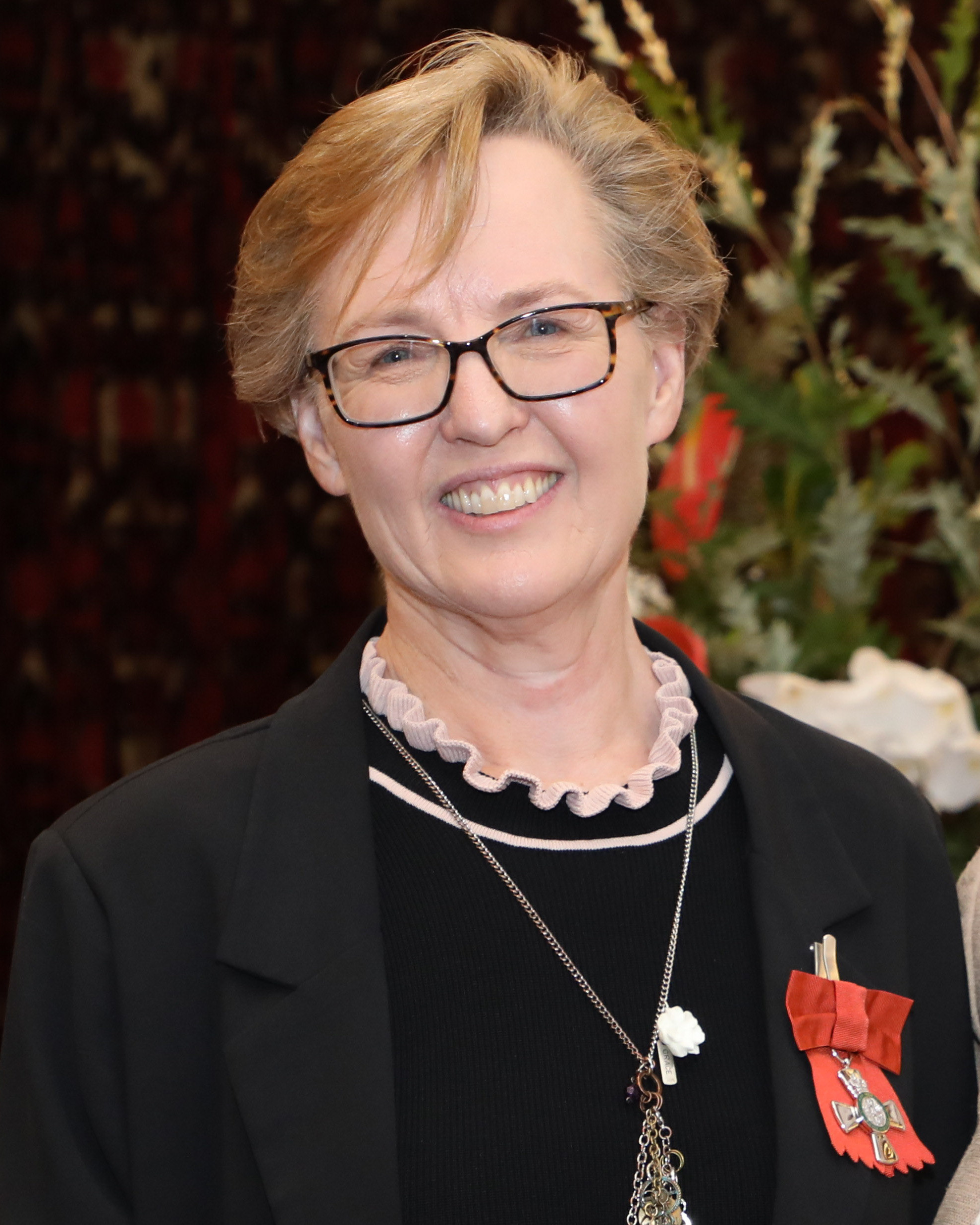
Judene Edgar

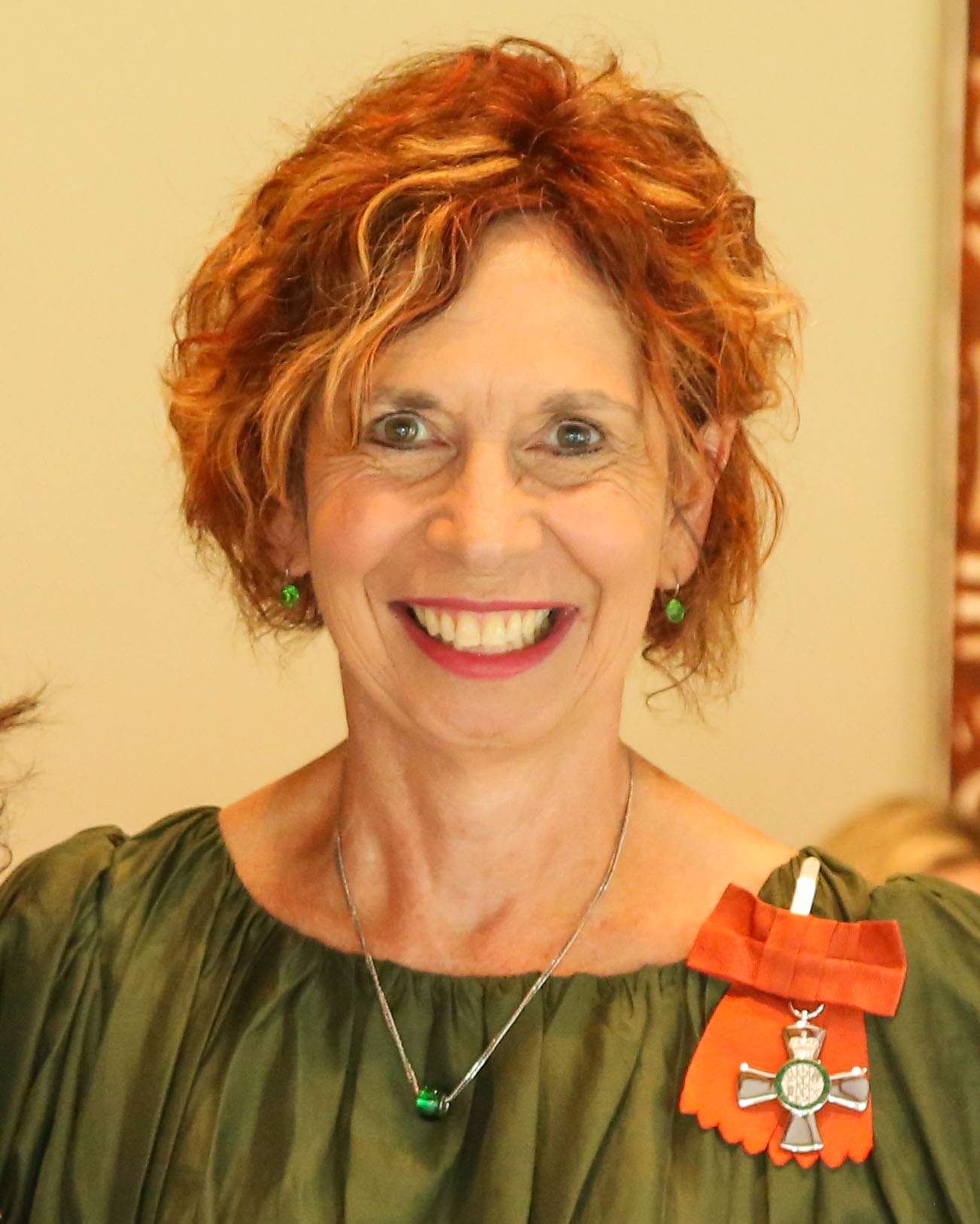
Jane Eynon‑Richards

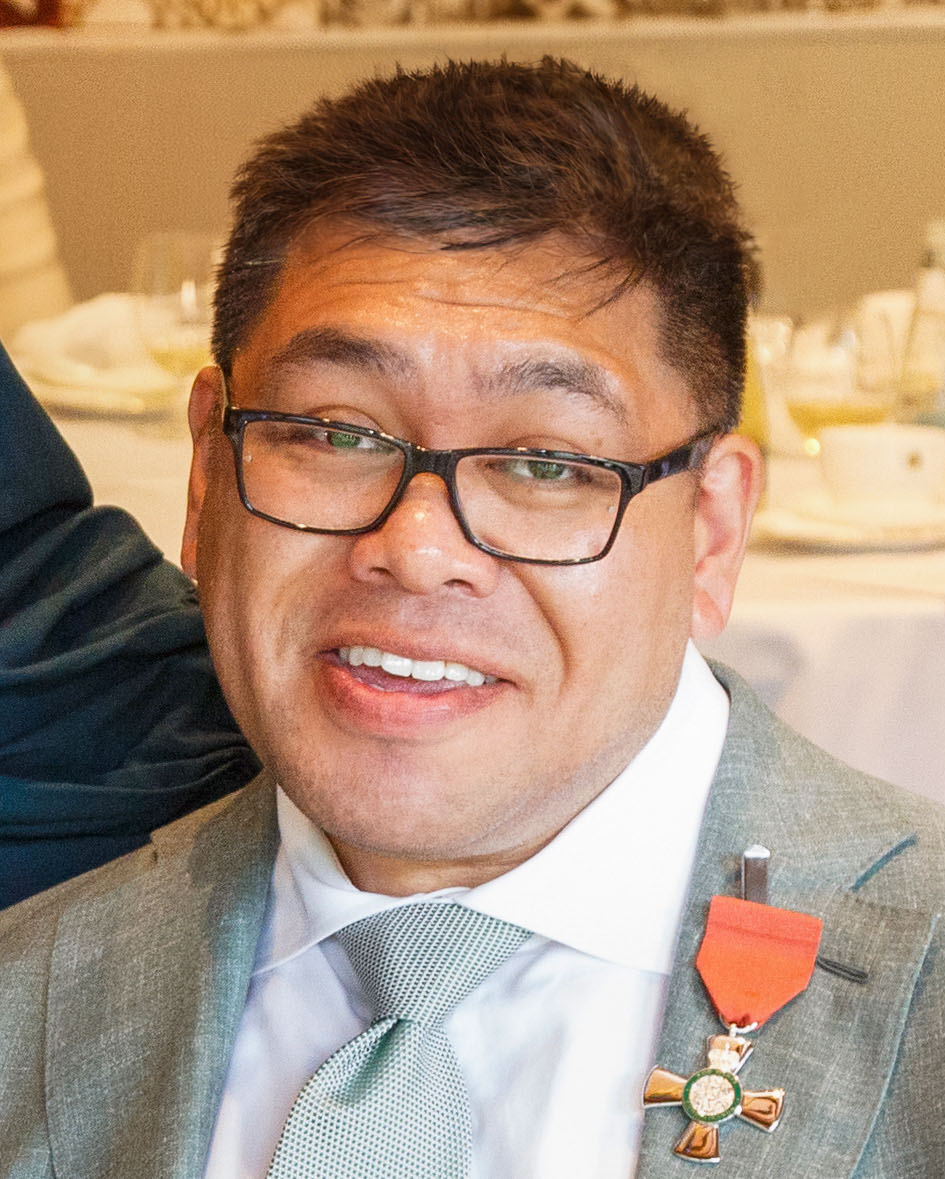
Jade Farrar

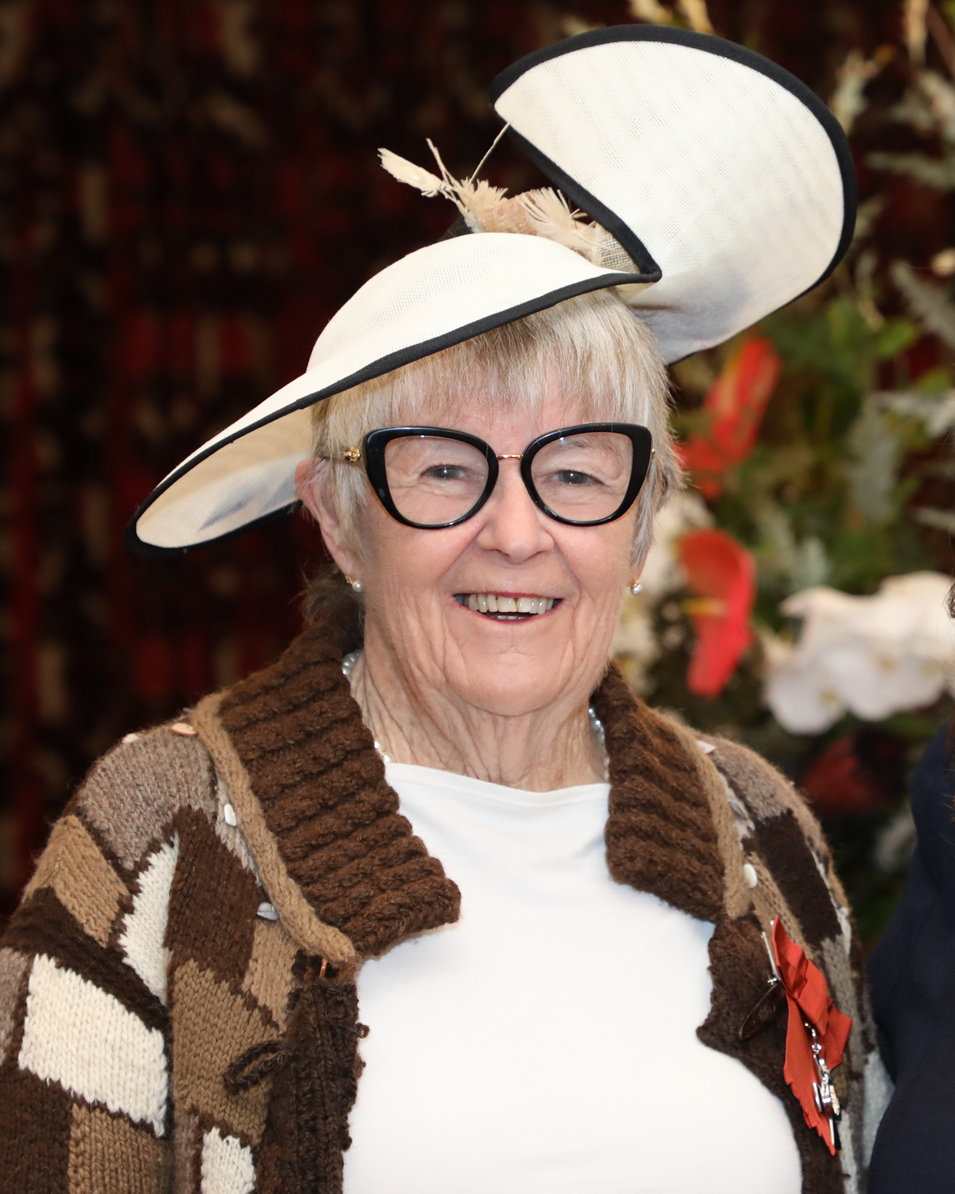
Bev Forrester

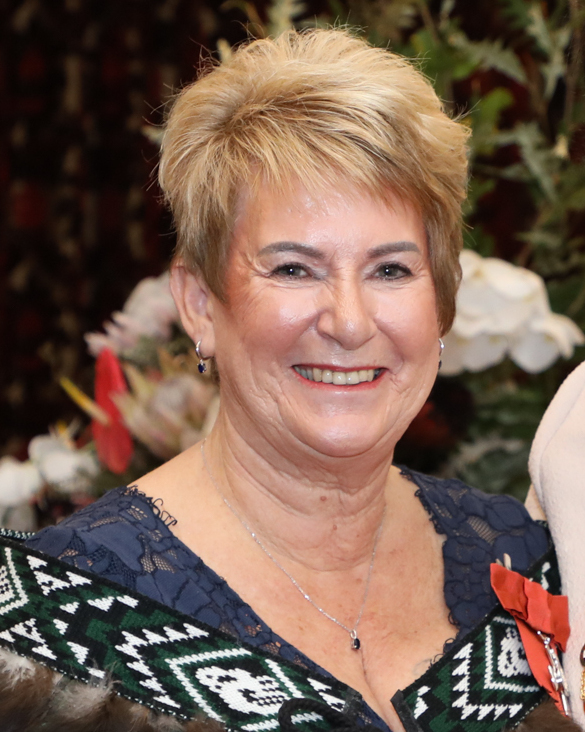
Deb Fraser‑Komene

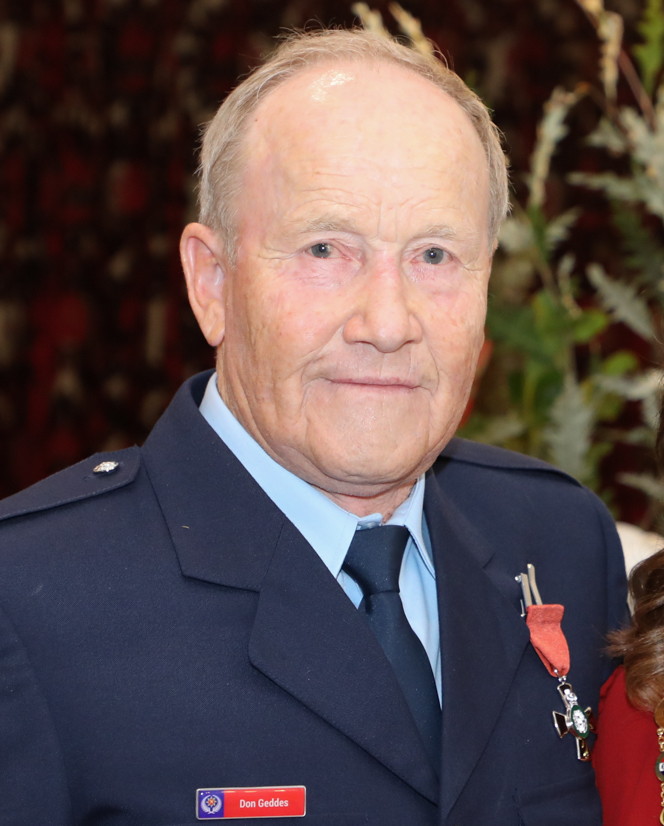
Don Geddes

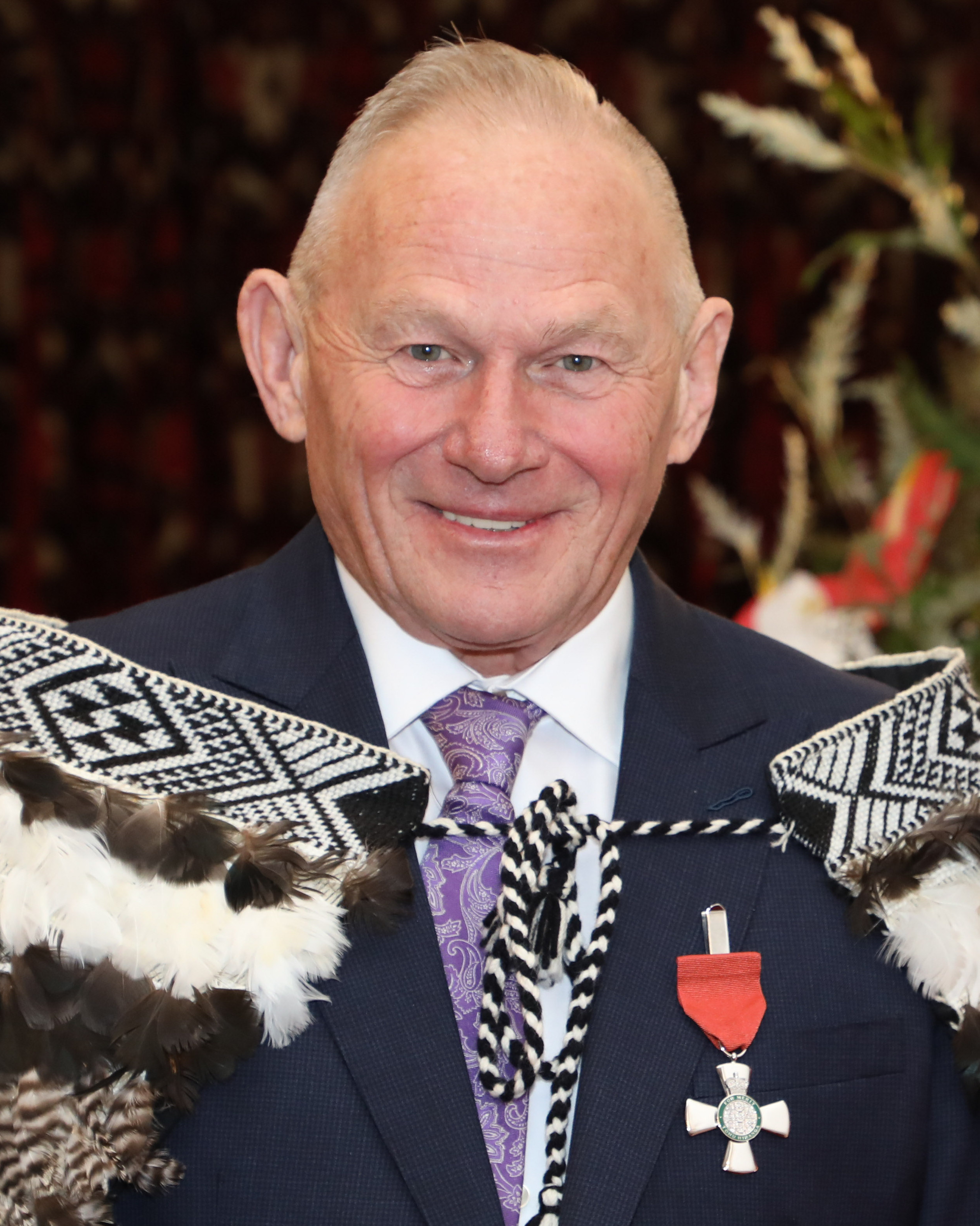
Malcolm Gillies

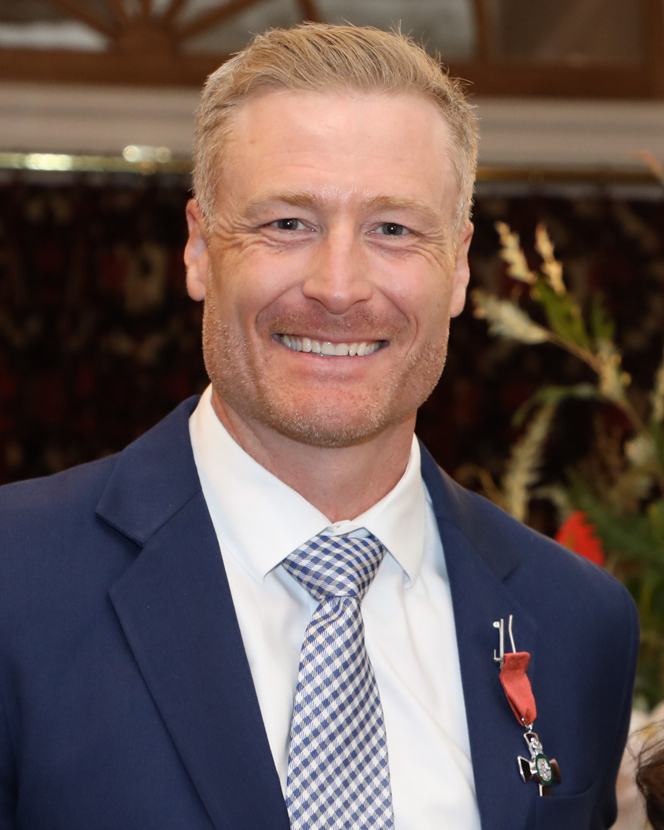
Martin Guptill

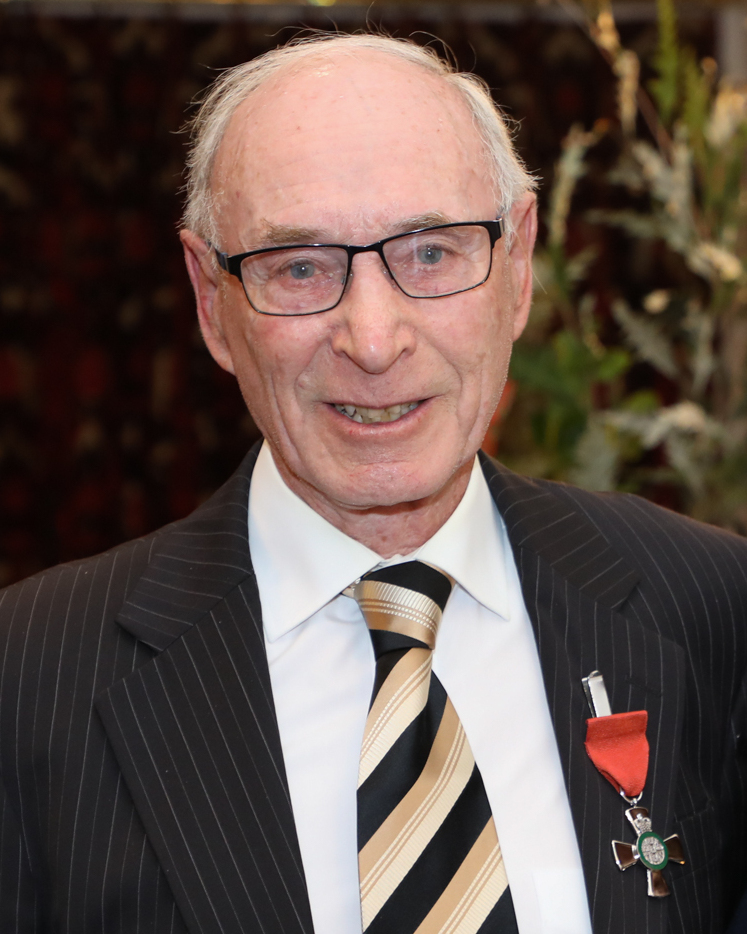
Martin Hadlee

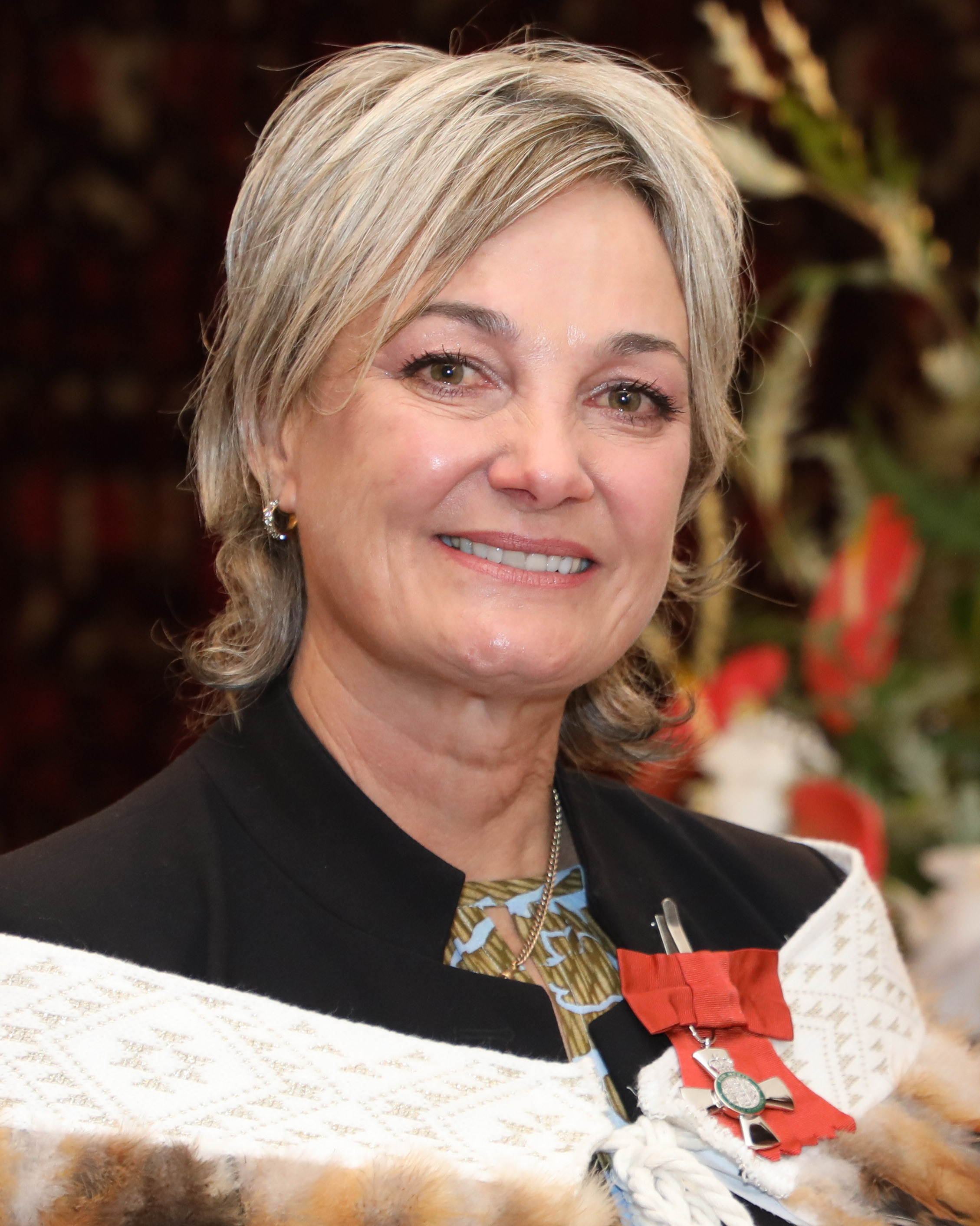
Janine Harrington

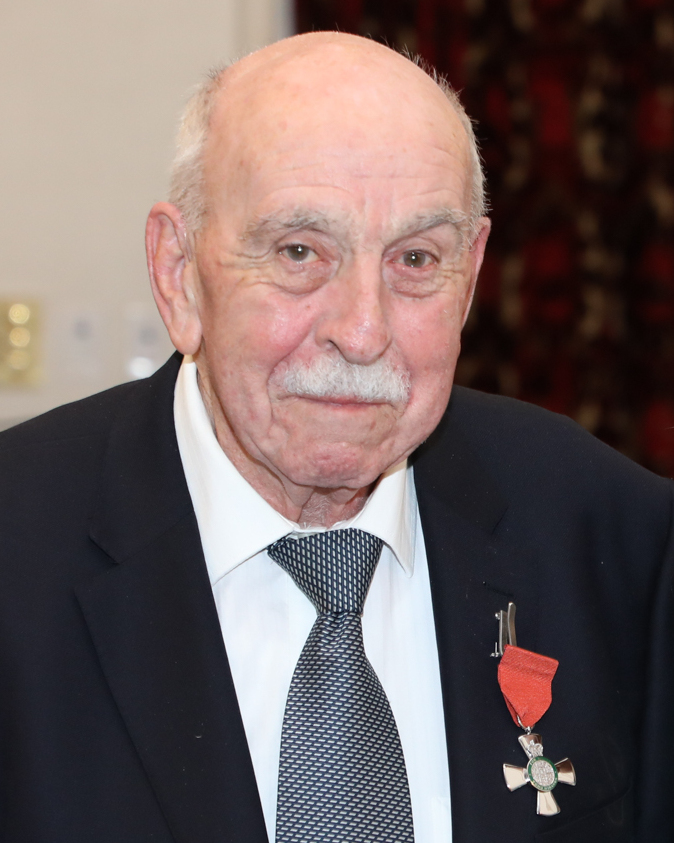
David Harrison

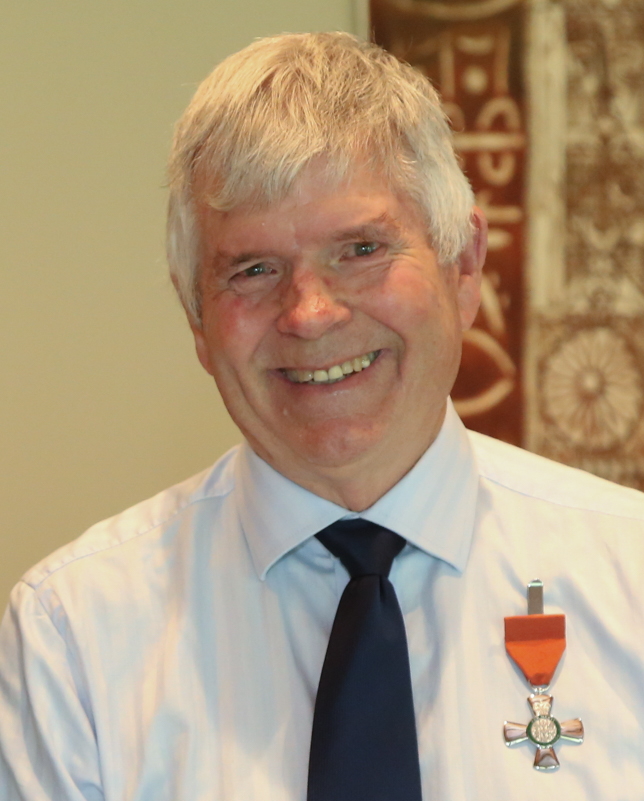
Jack Hobbs

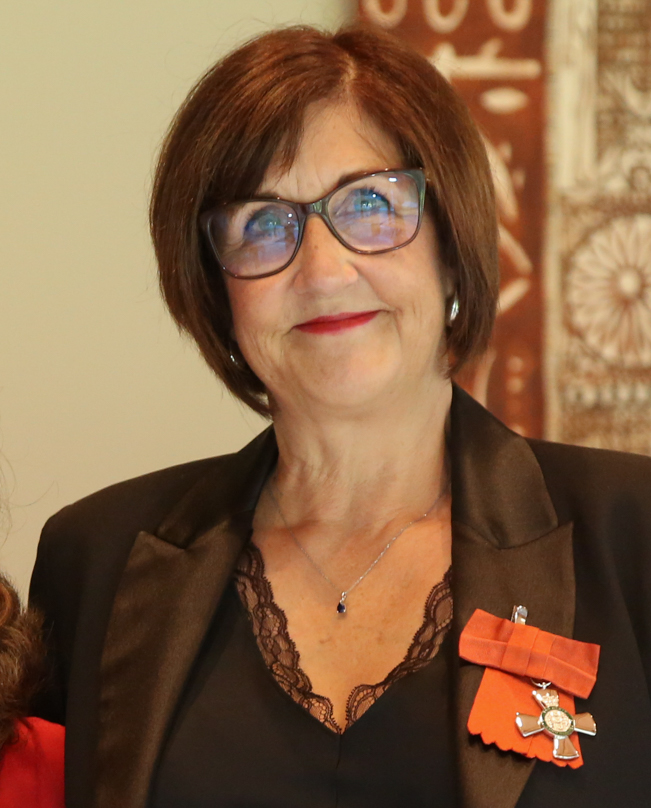
Sue Hobbs

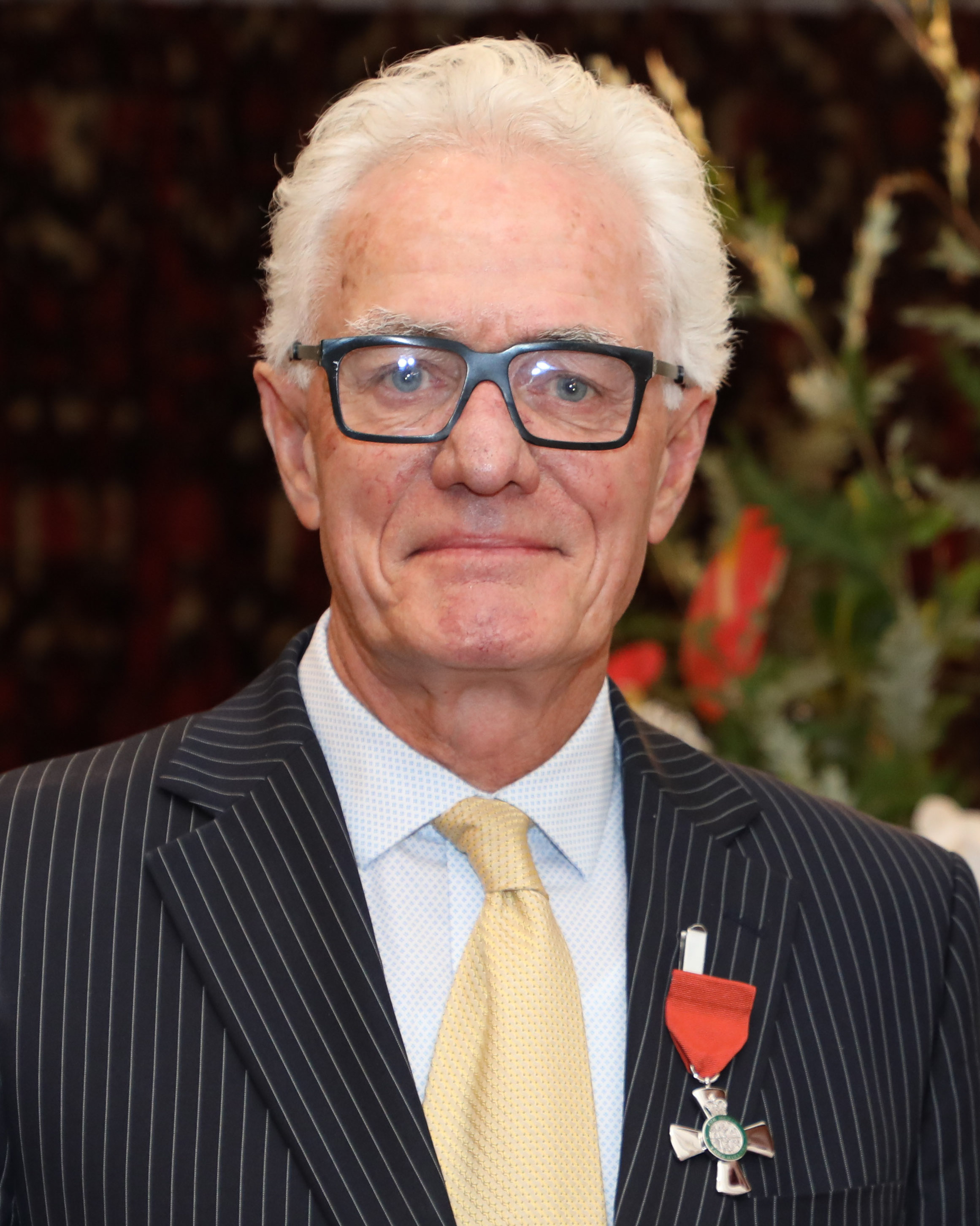
Gerald Hope

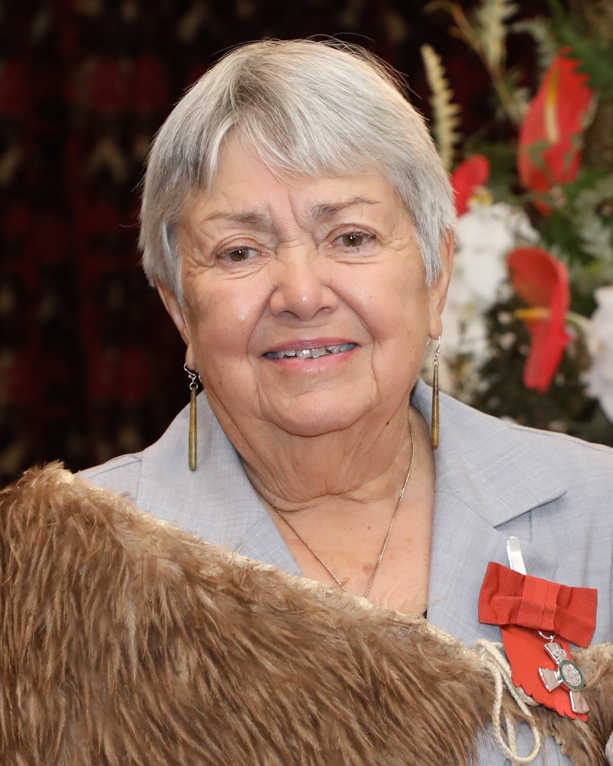
Kāren Johansen

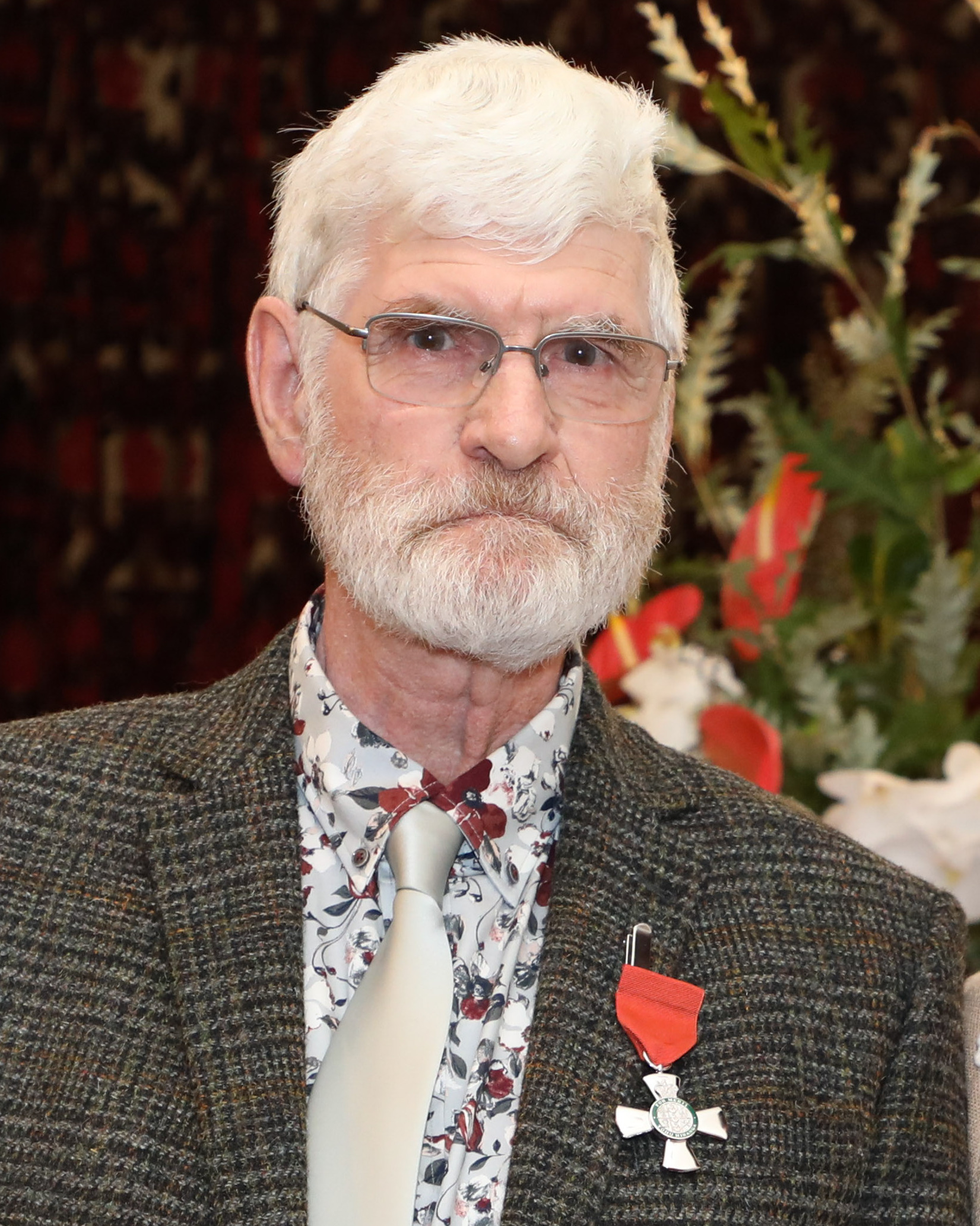
Richard Kennett

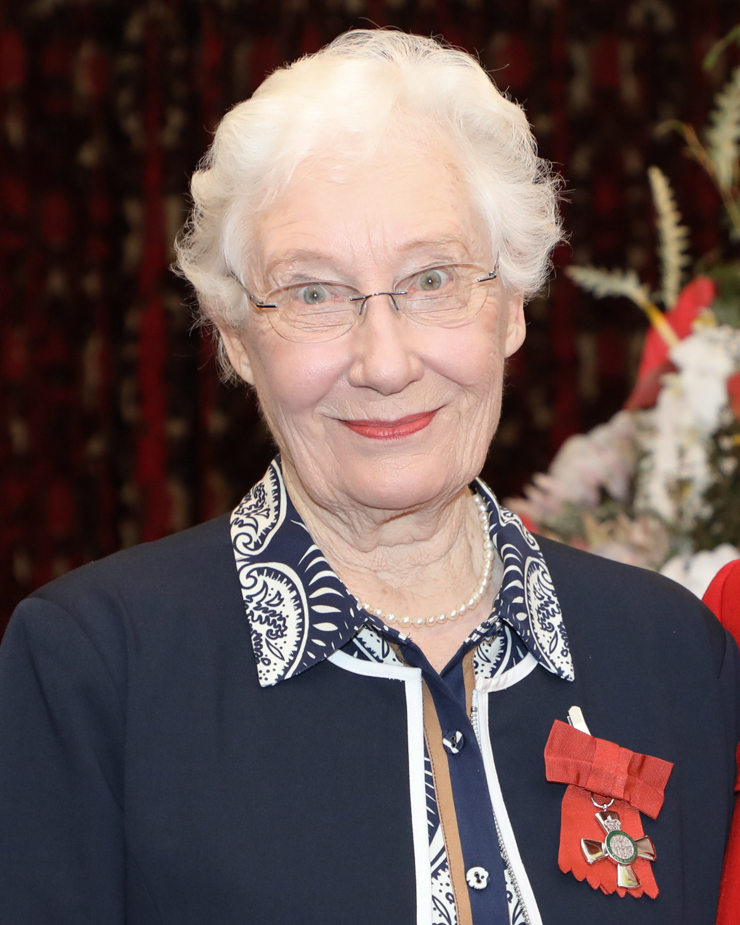
Jill Kerr

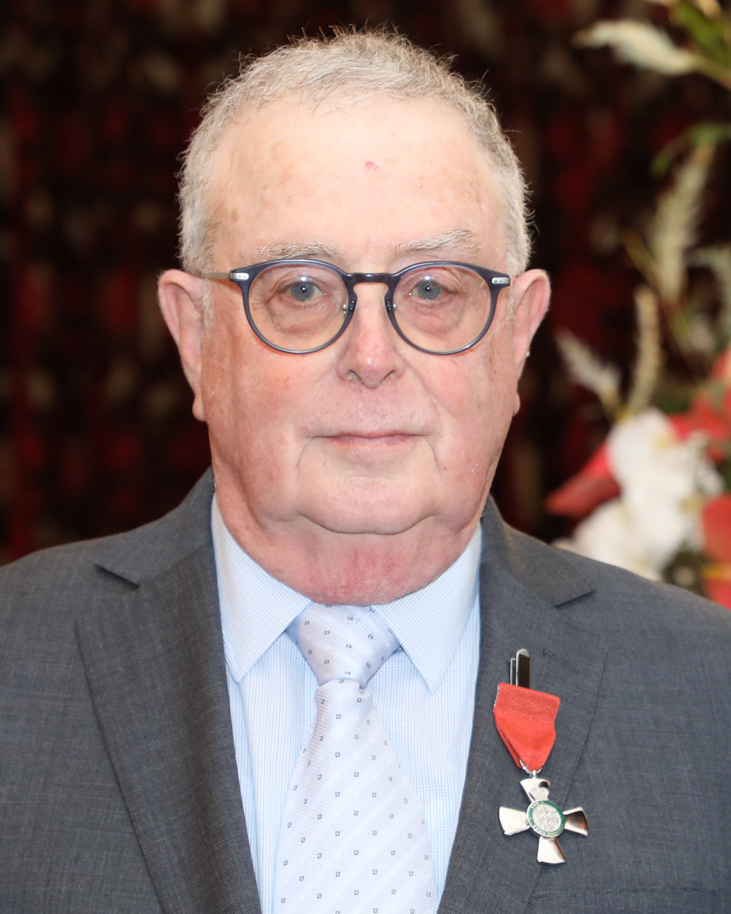
Murray King

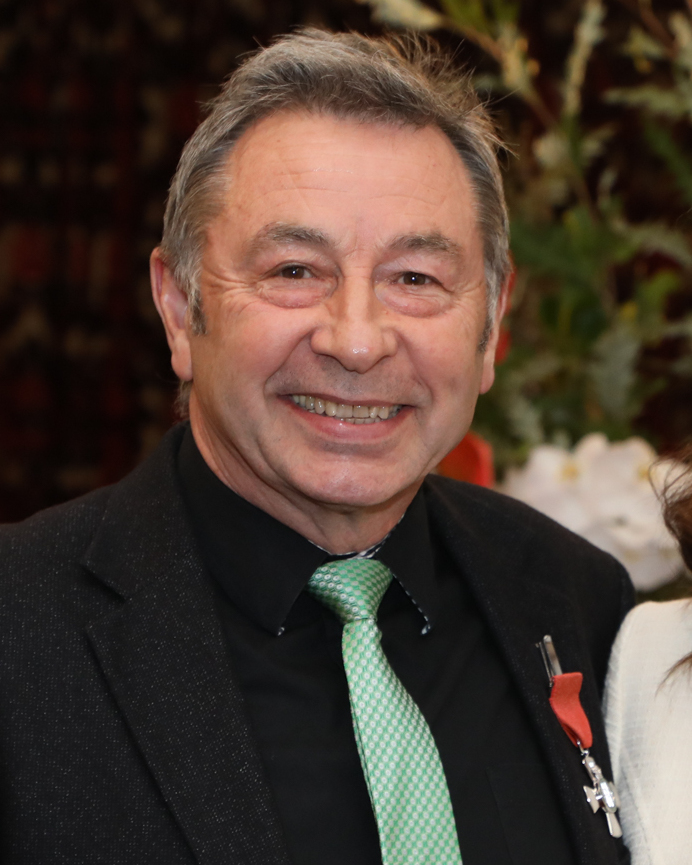
Mark Limacher

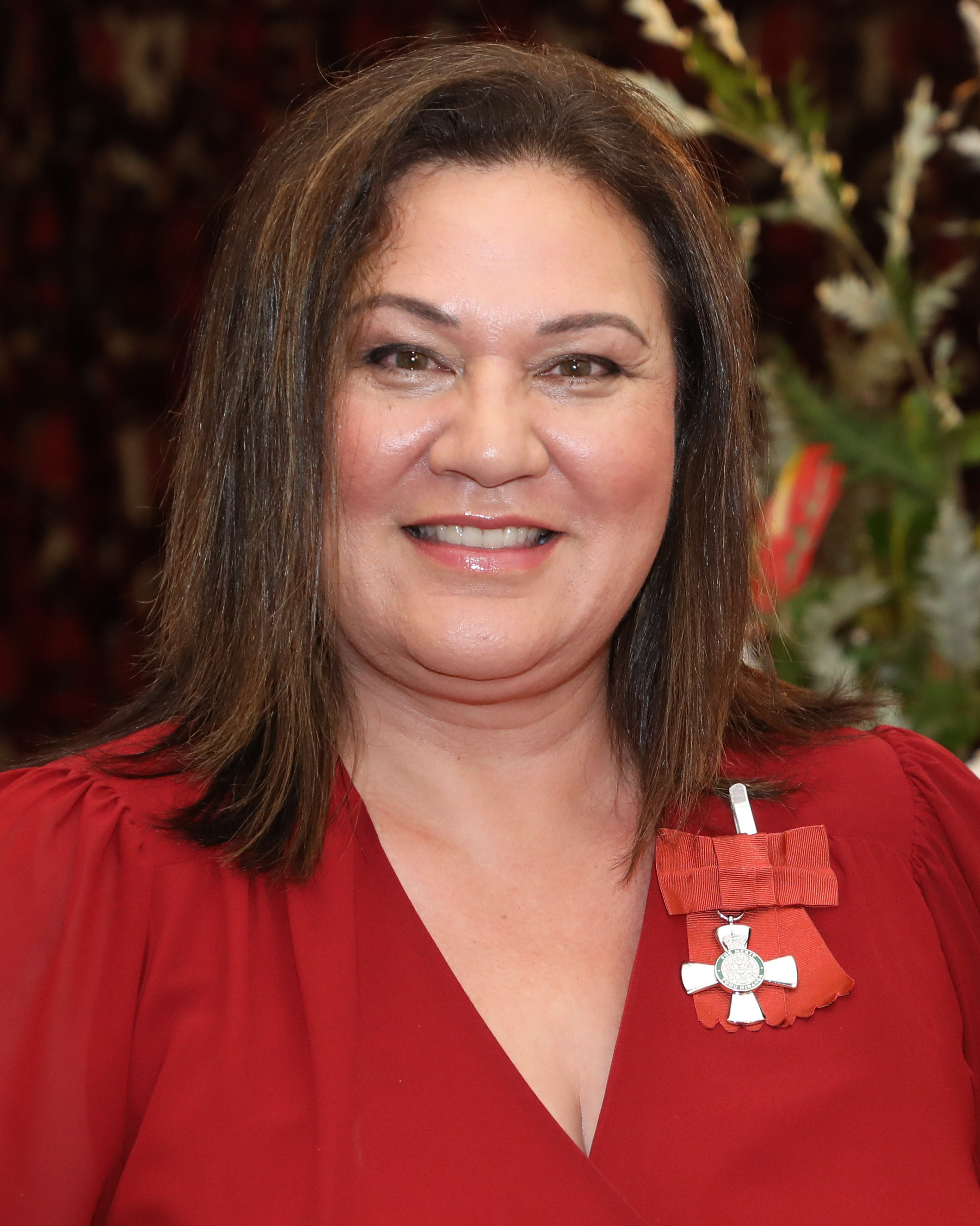
Tracie Mafile'o

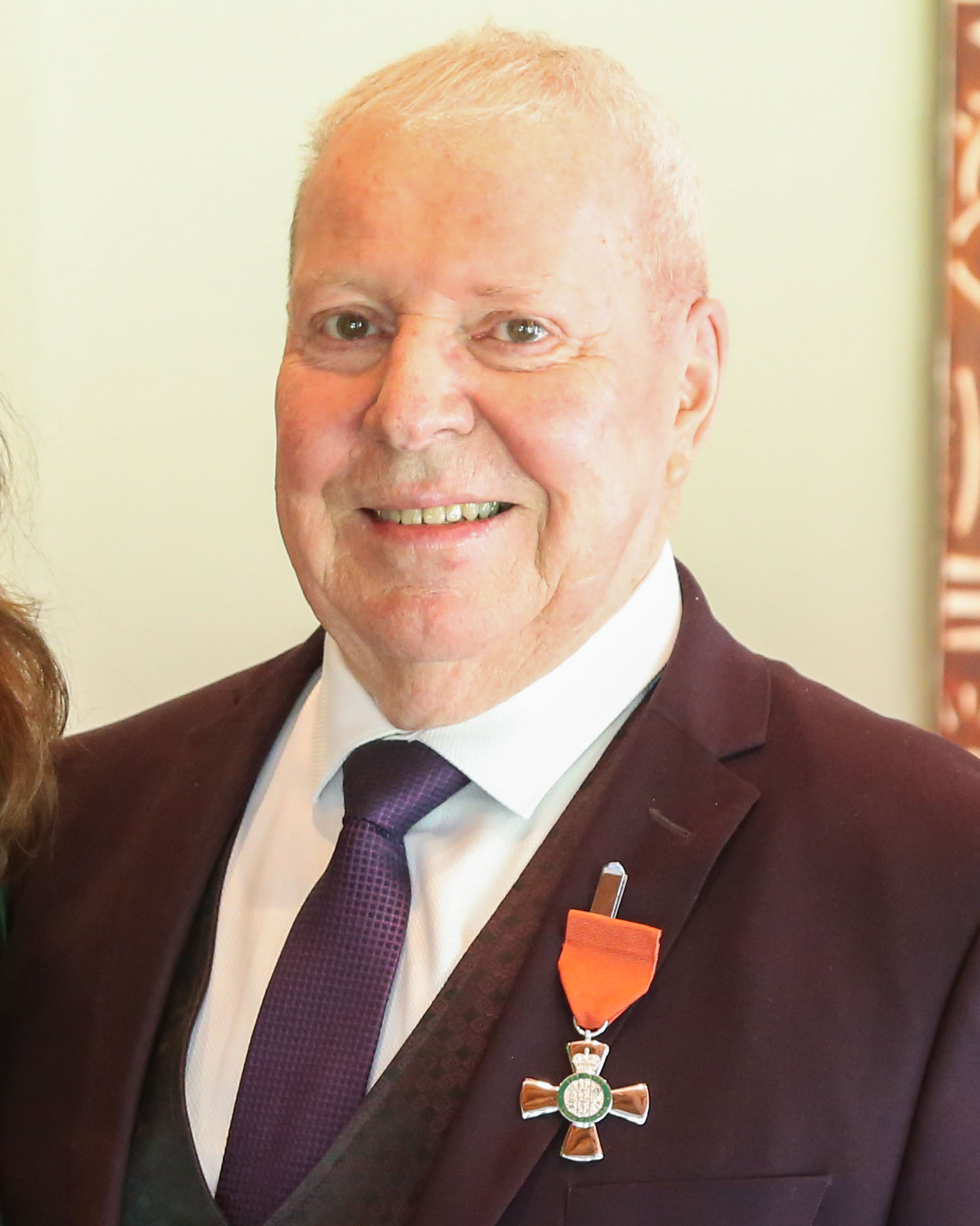
Terence Maskell

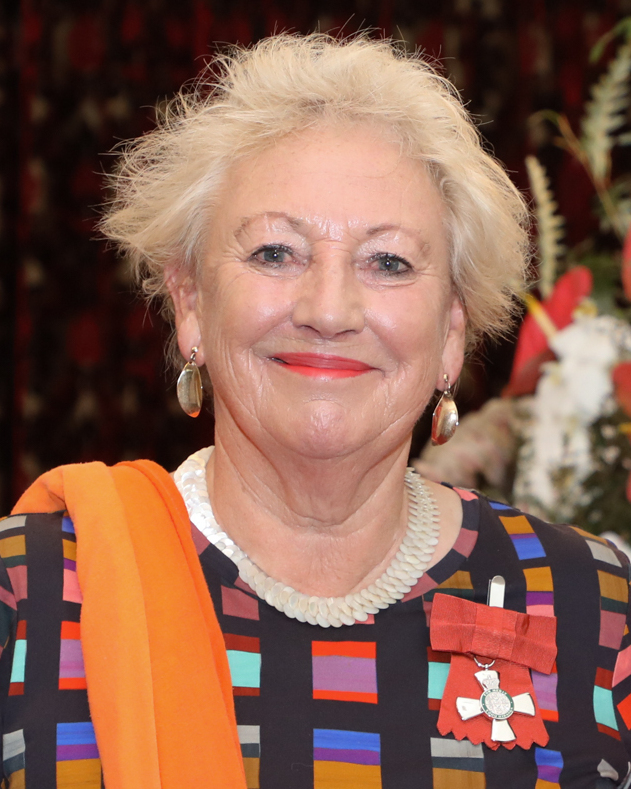
Nicky McArthur

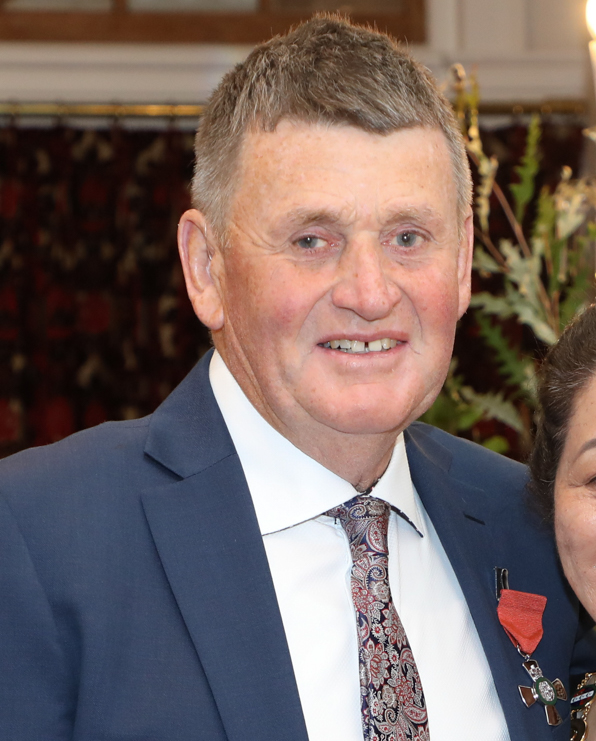
Malcolm McKee

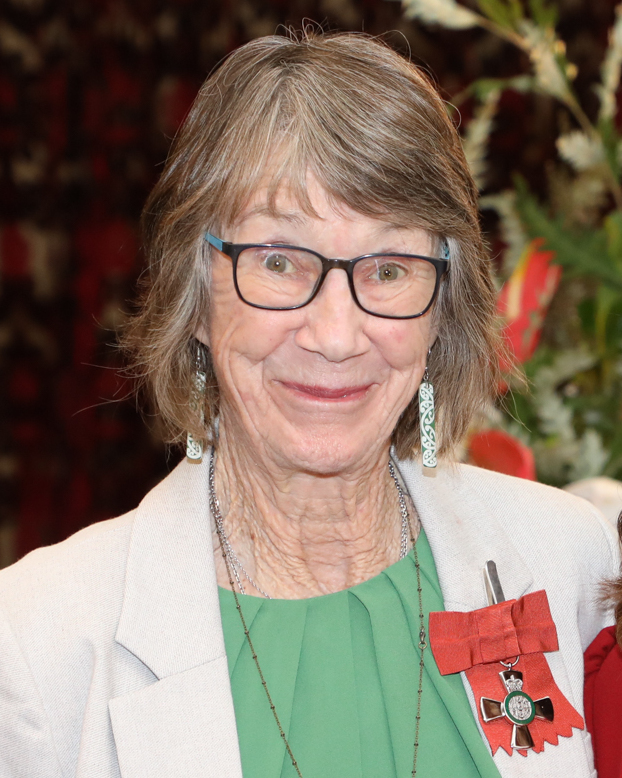
Dawn McMillan

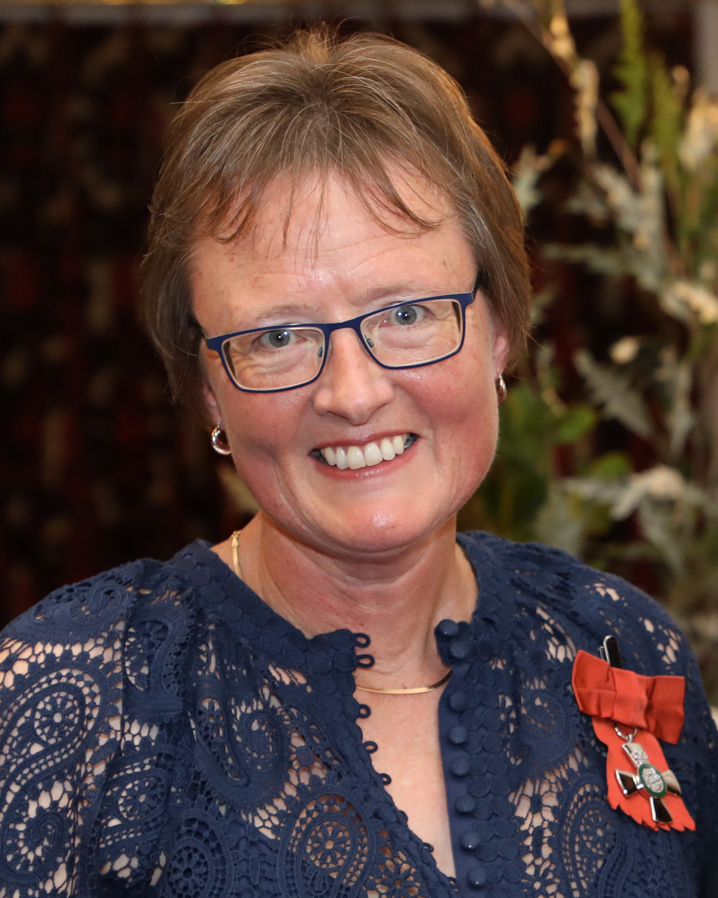
Kate Milford

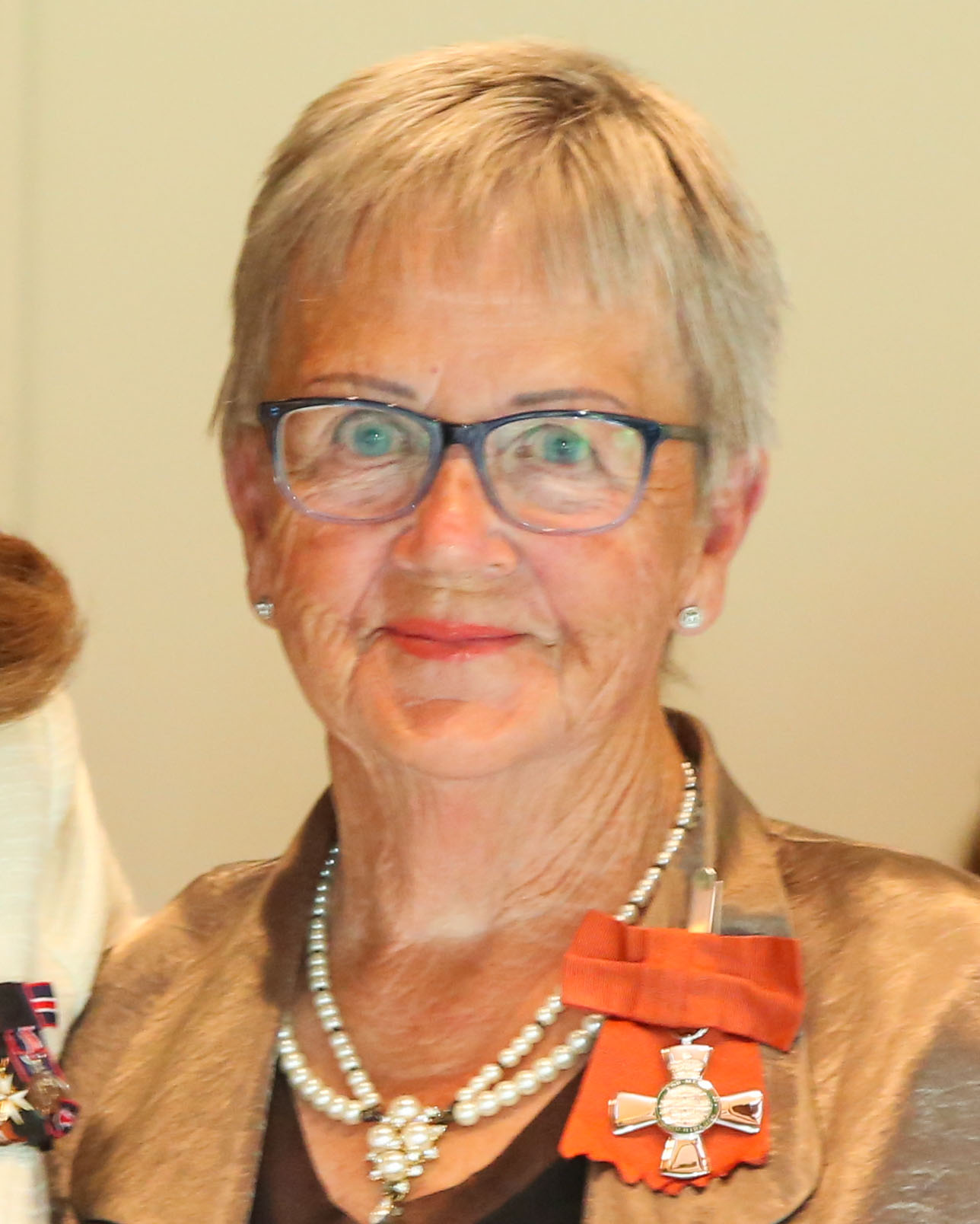
Jenny Nahu

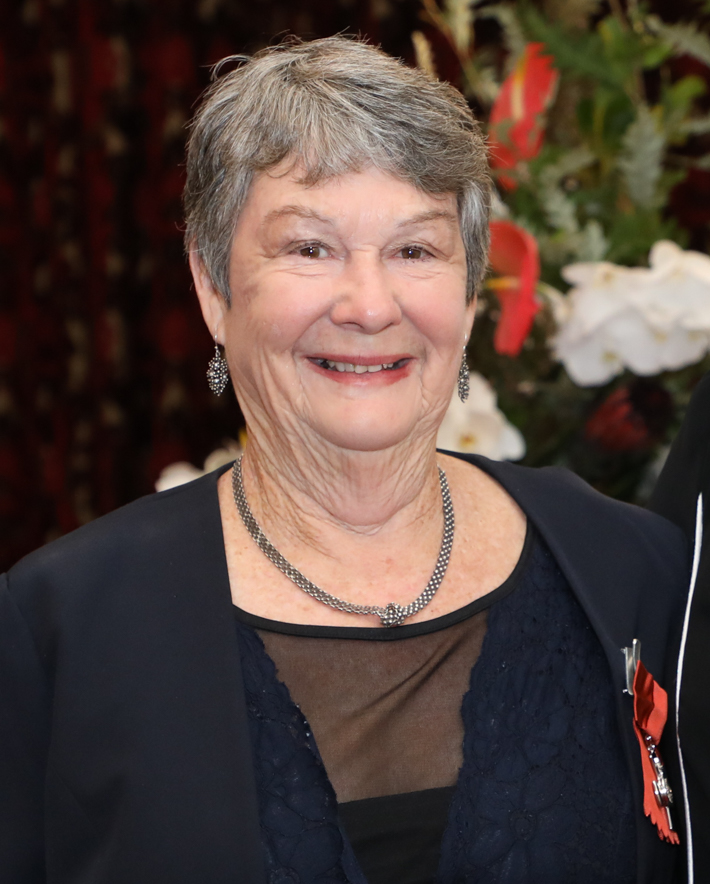
Viv Napier

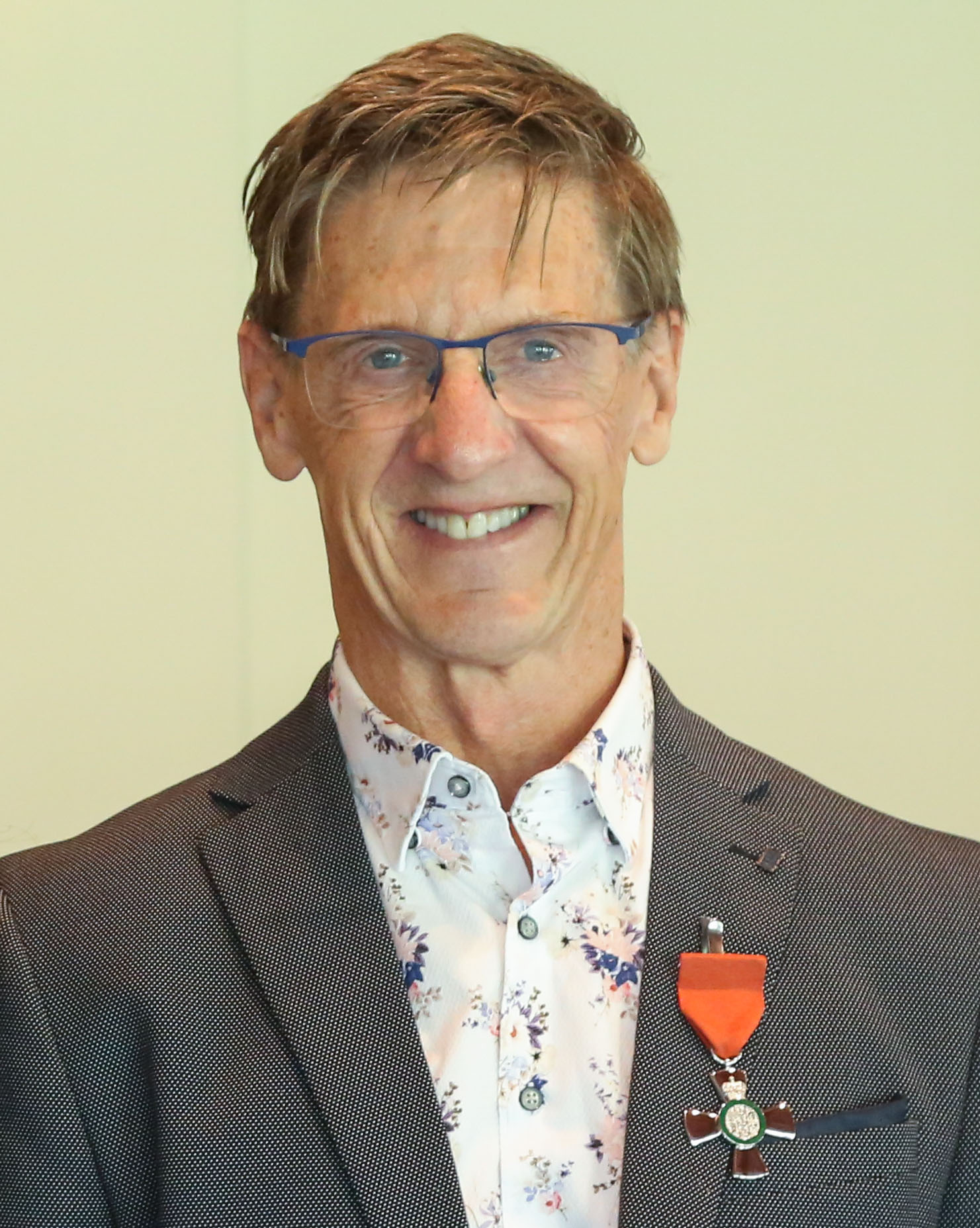
Stephen Neville

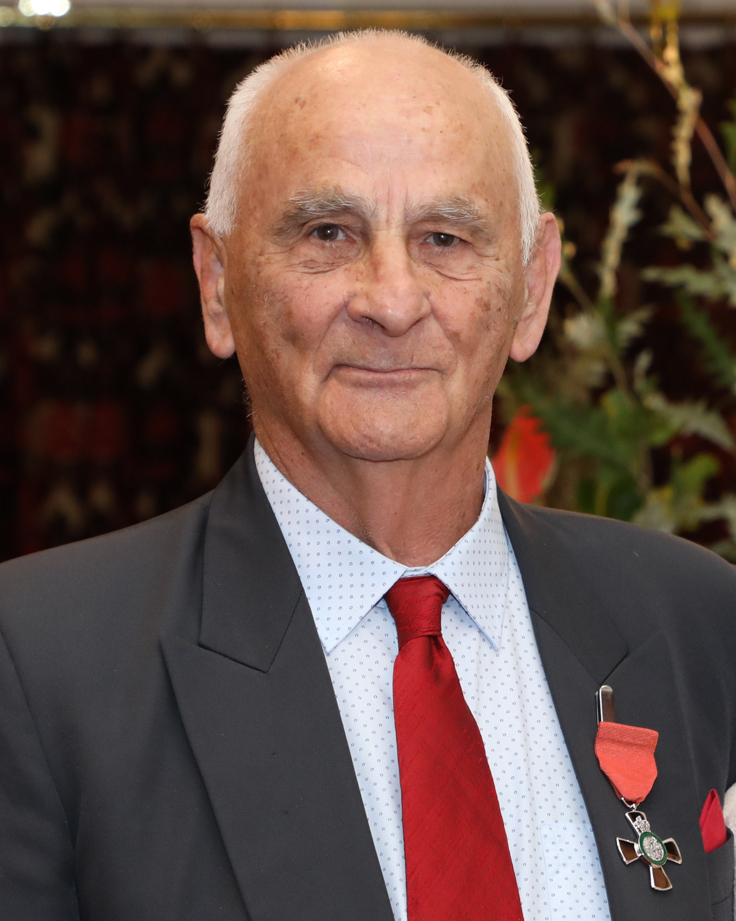
Kevin Nielsen

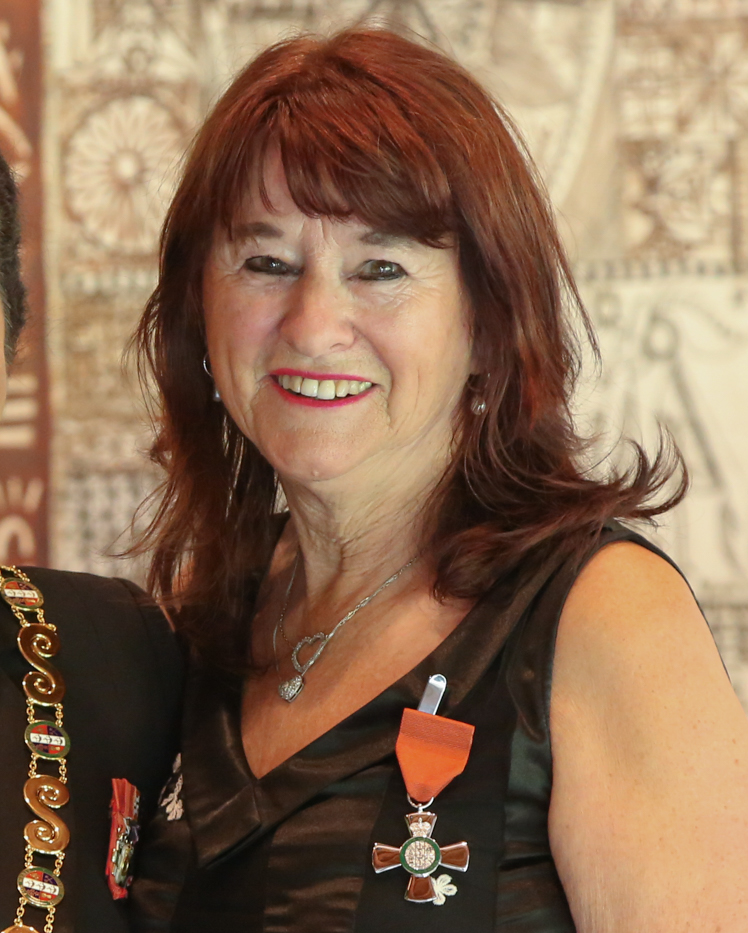
Caroline Oliver

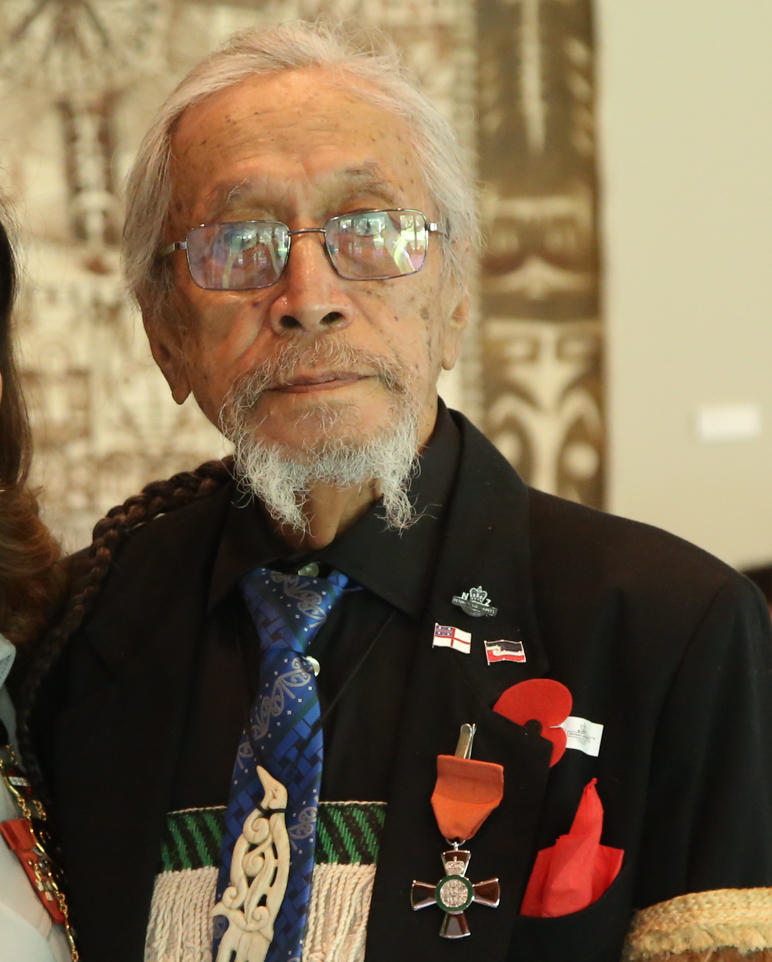
Hori Parata

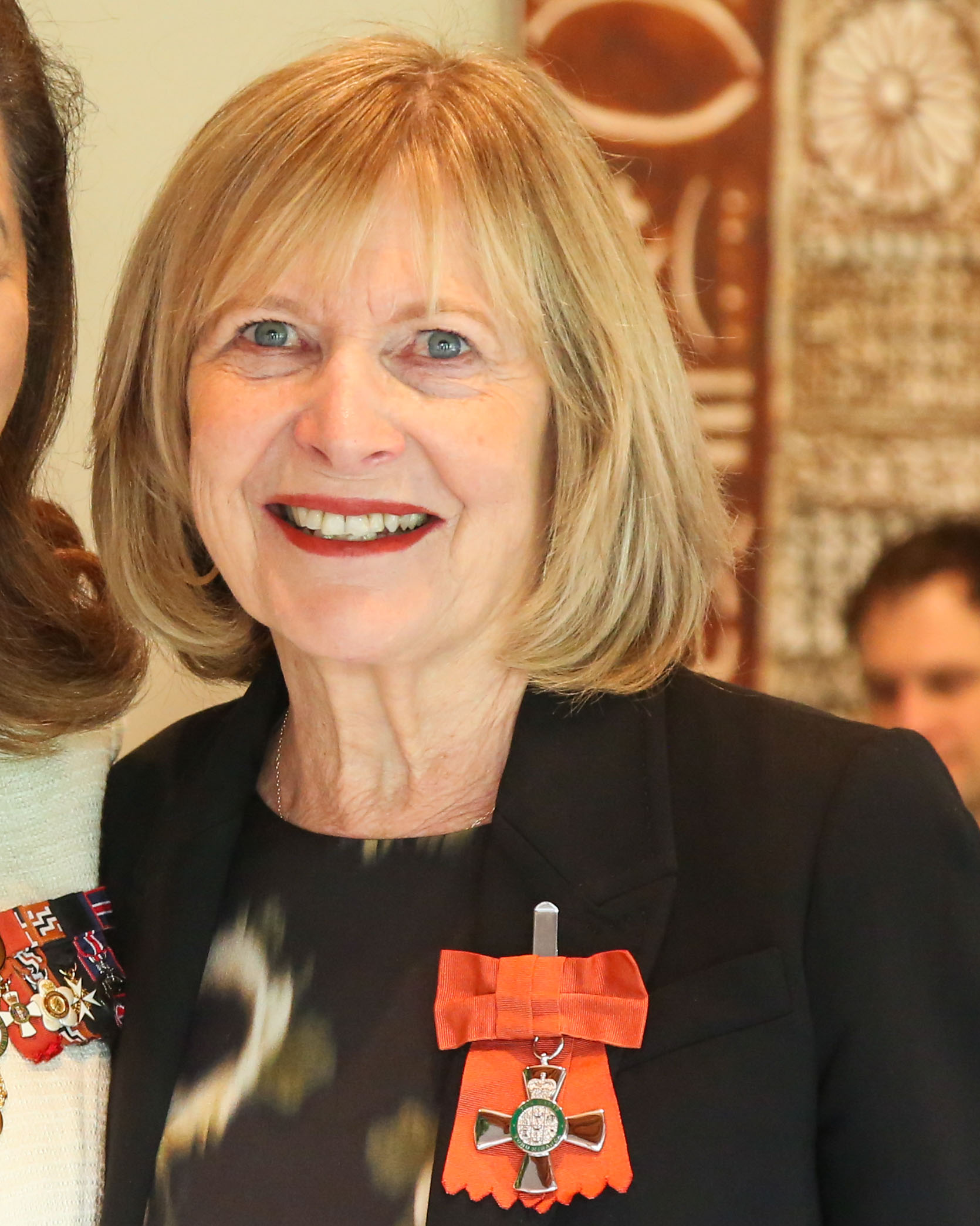
Sandy Pasley

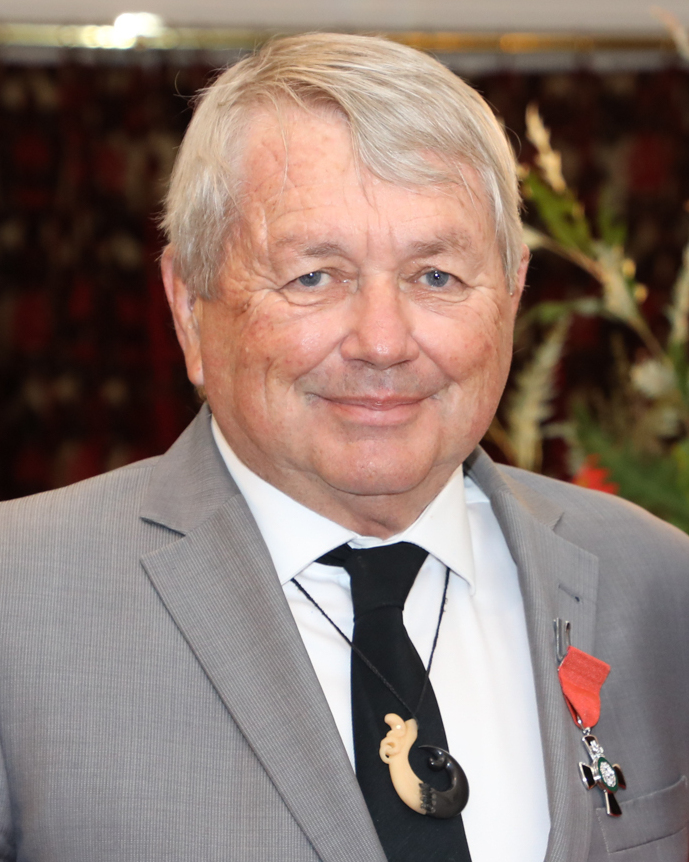
David Pluck

Ruawhitu Pokaia

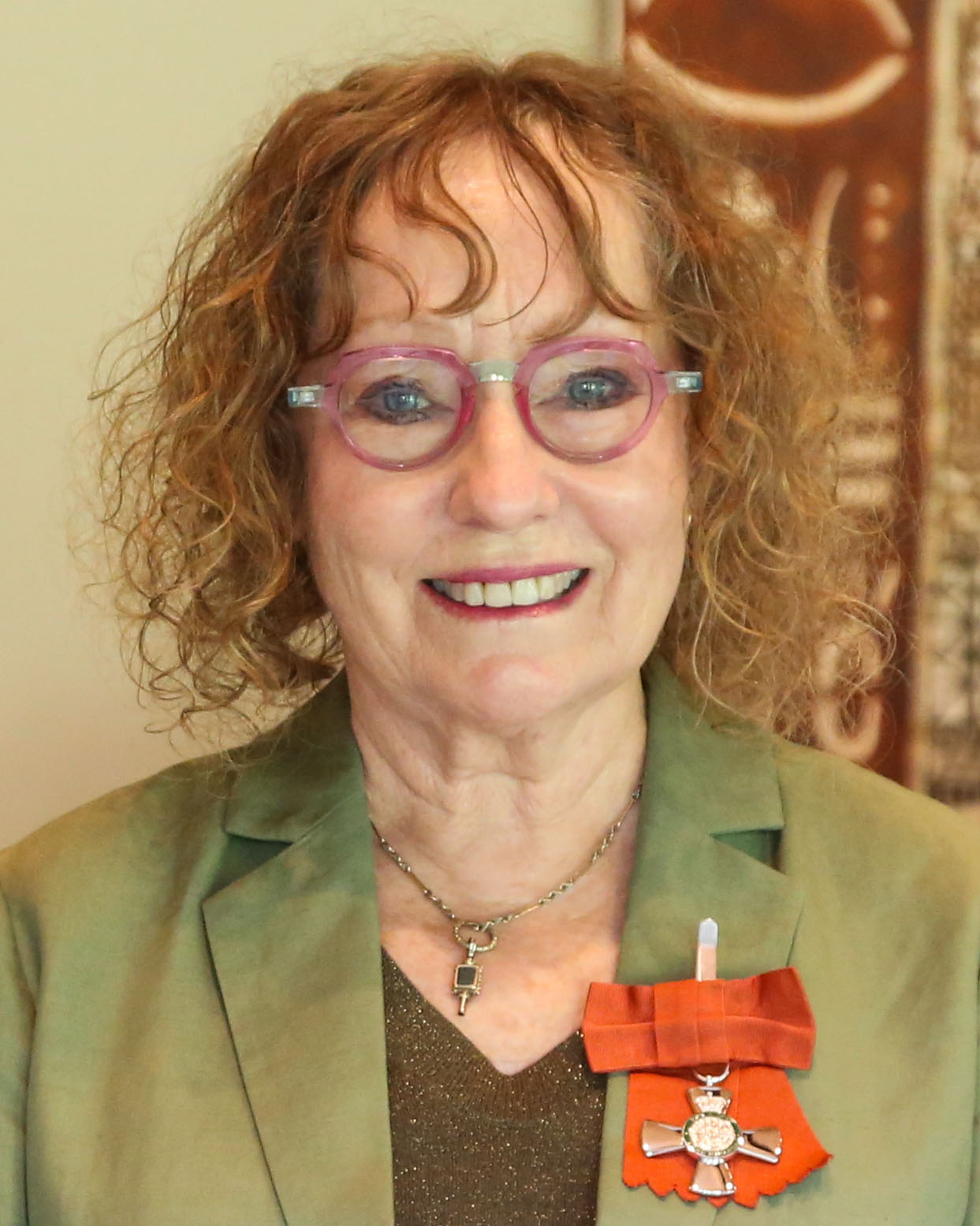
Gaye Poole

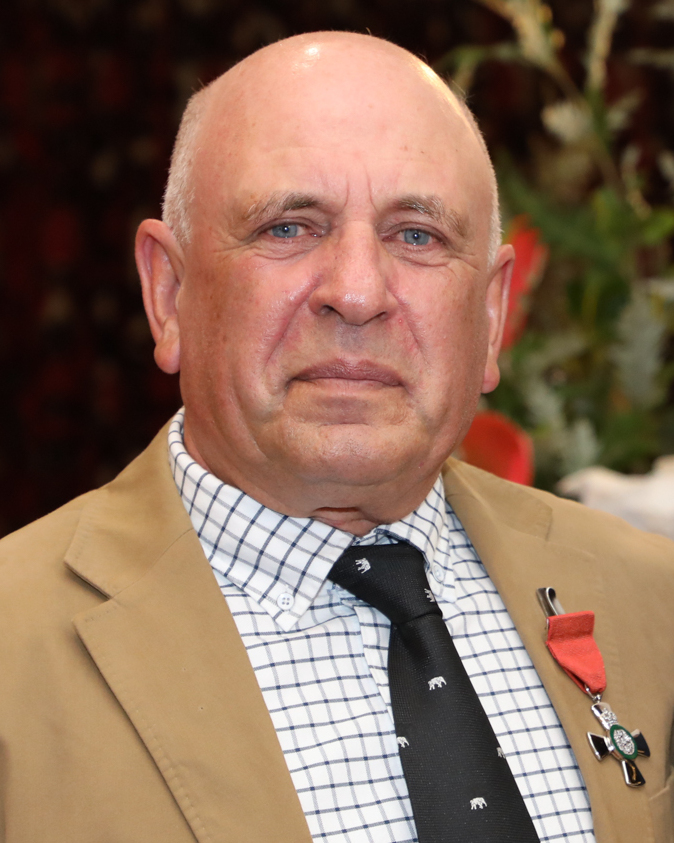
Ian Poulter

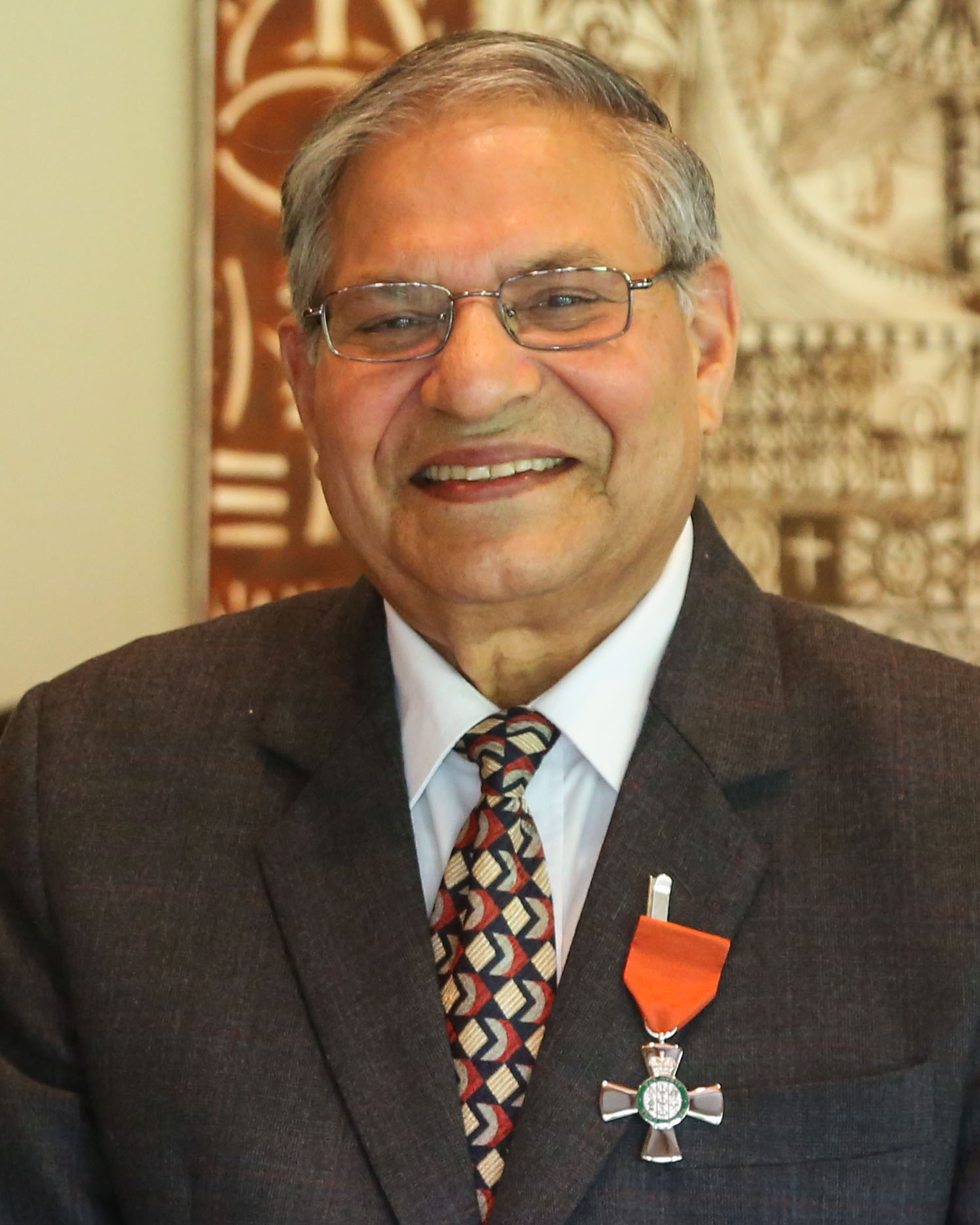
Ravinder Powar

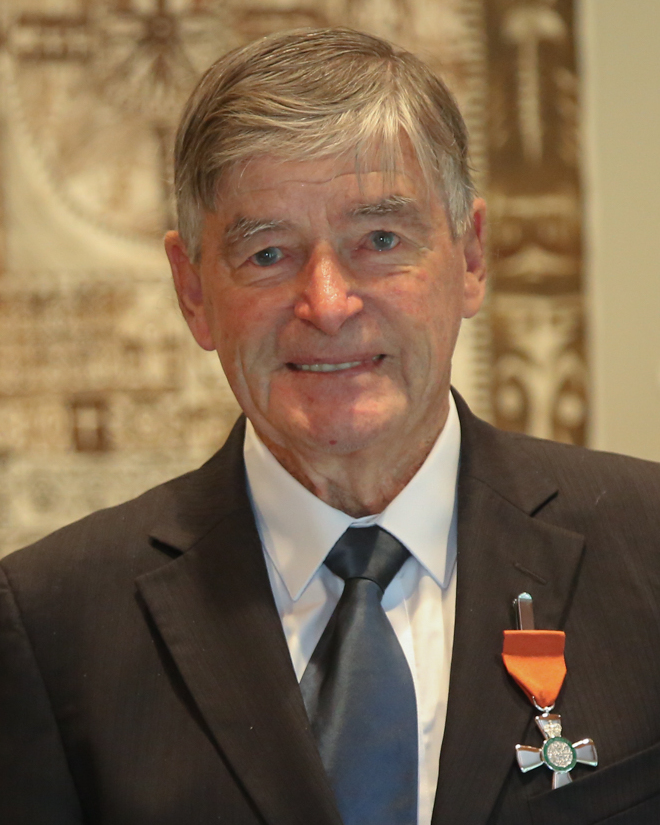
John Robinson

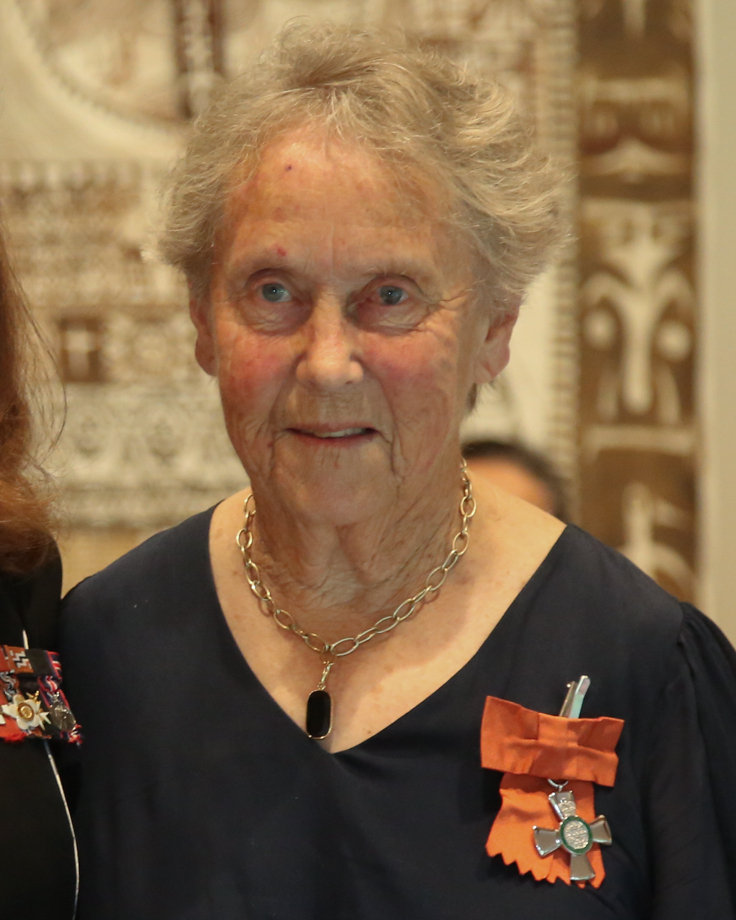
Val Robinson

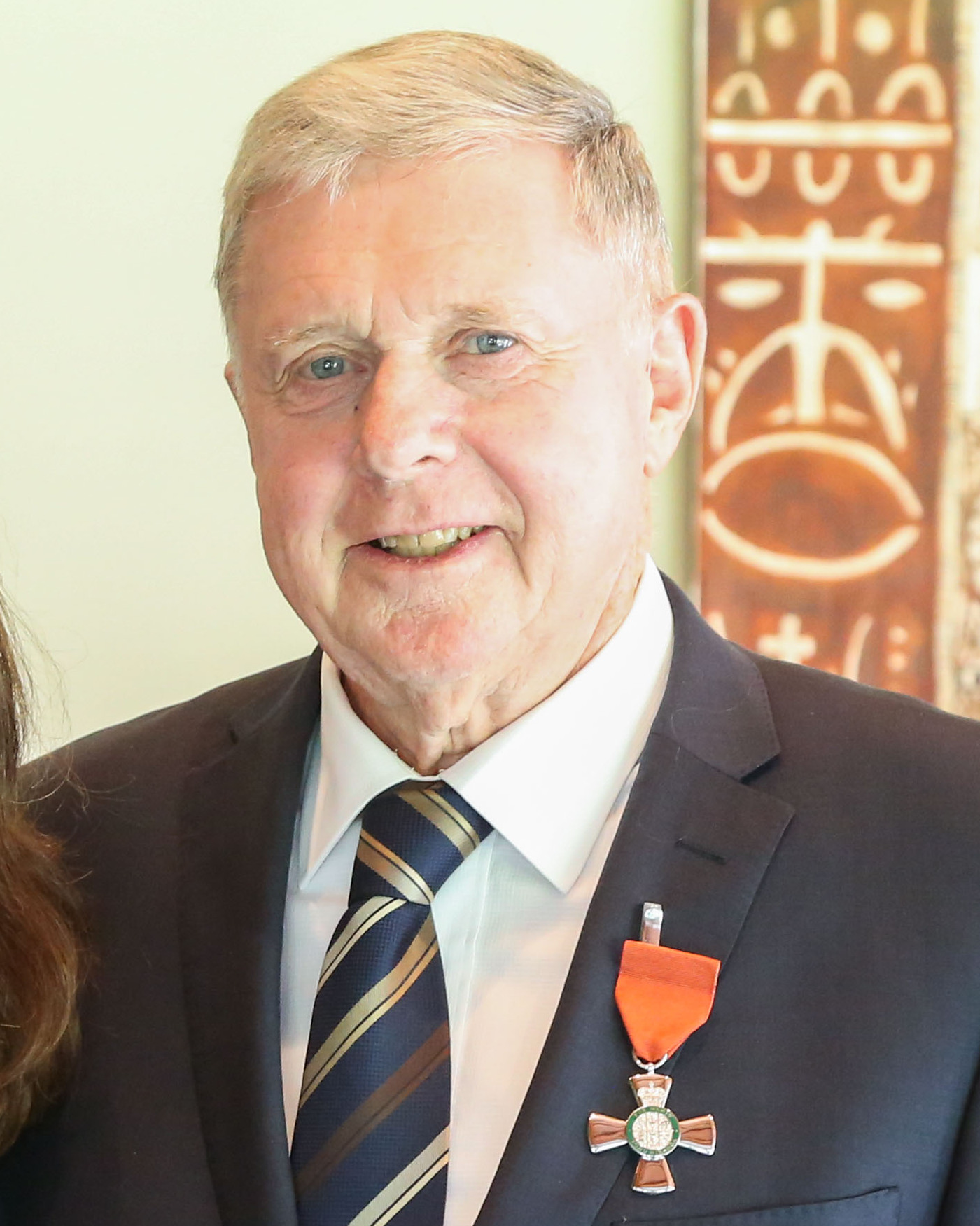
John Roughan

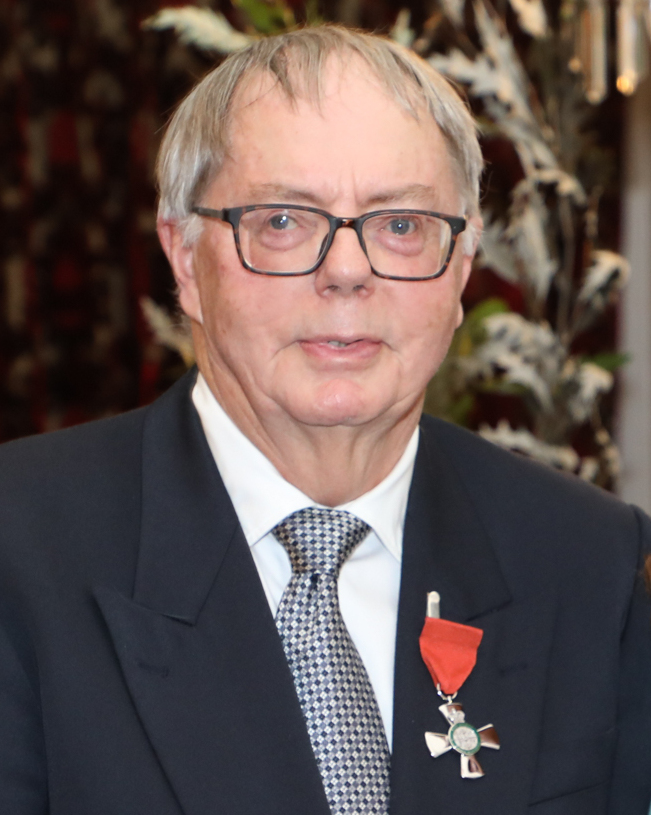
Bruce Shalders

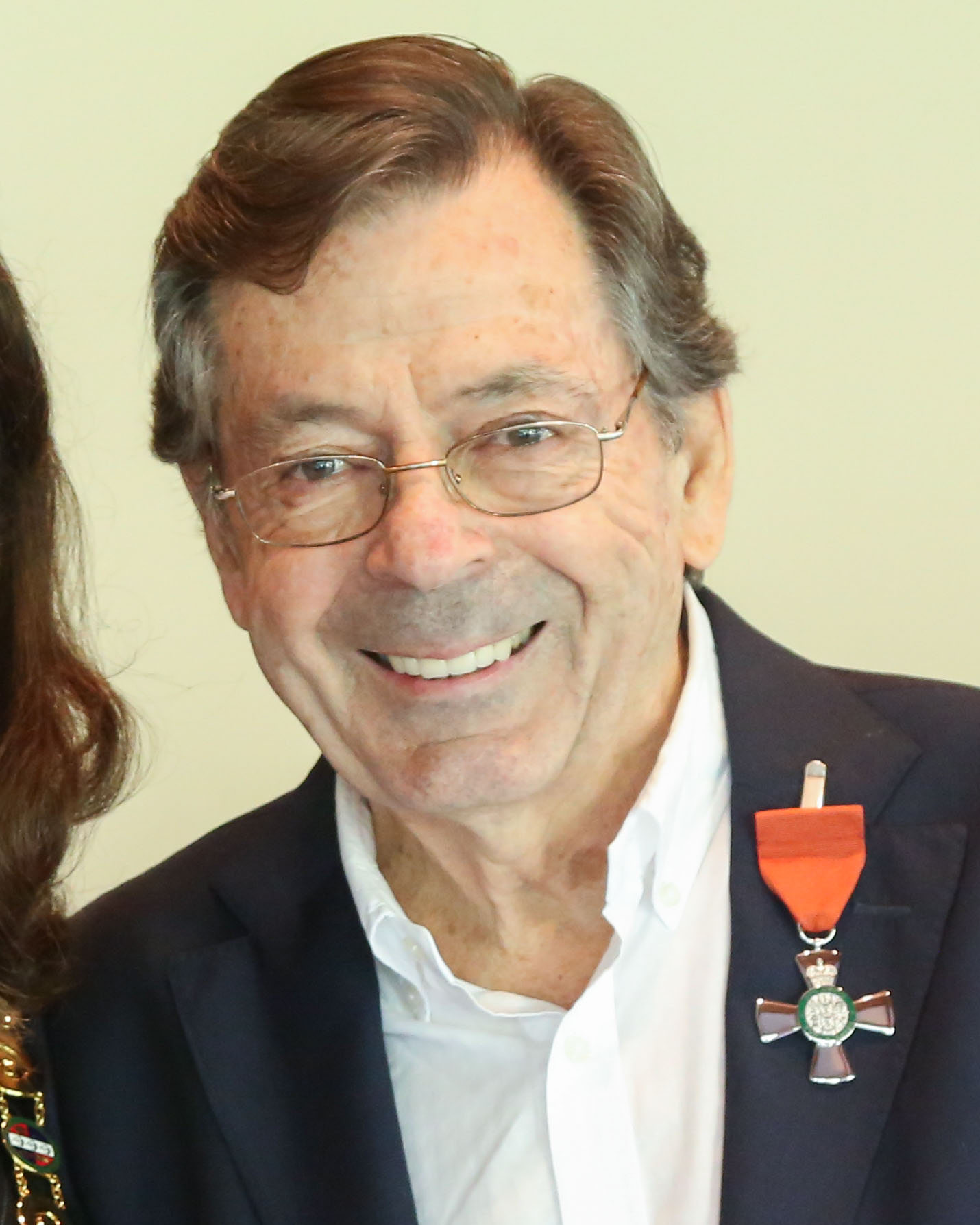
Leighton Smith

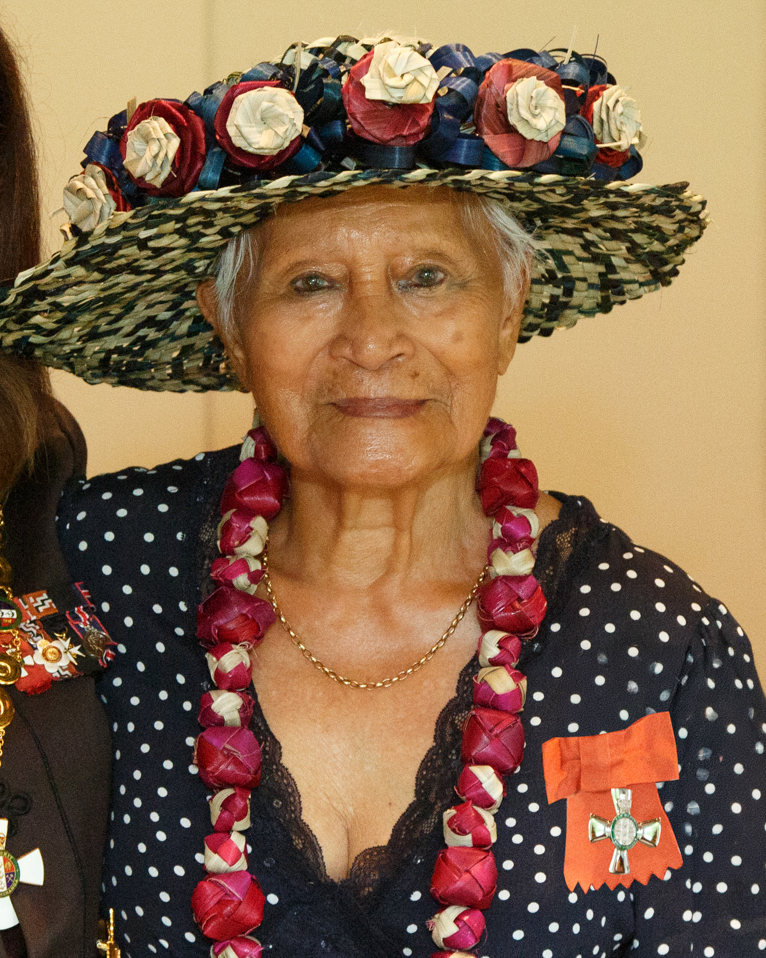
Matafetu Smith

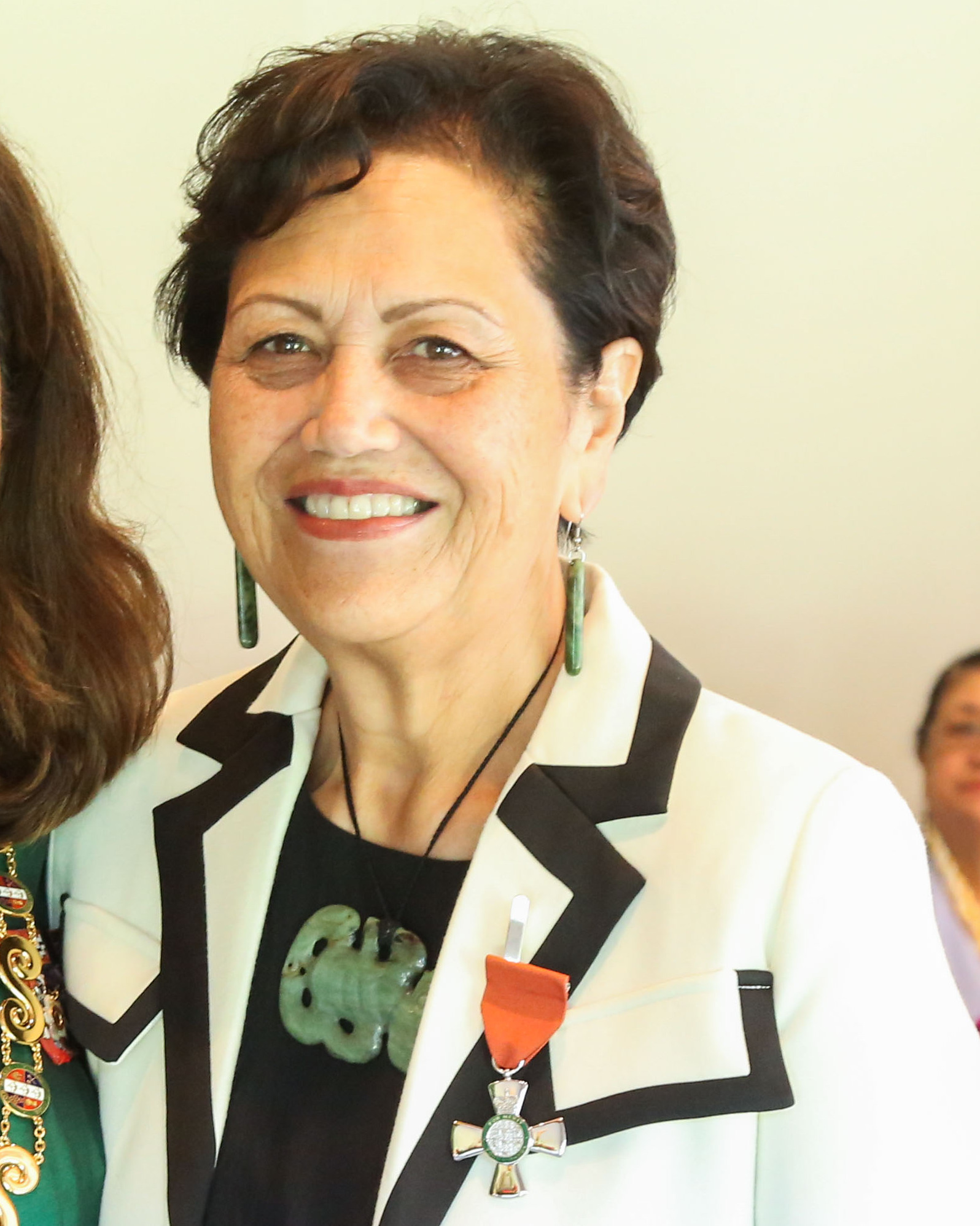
Arihia Stirling

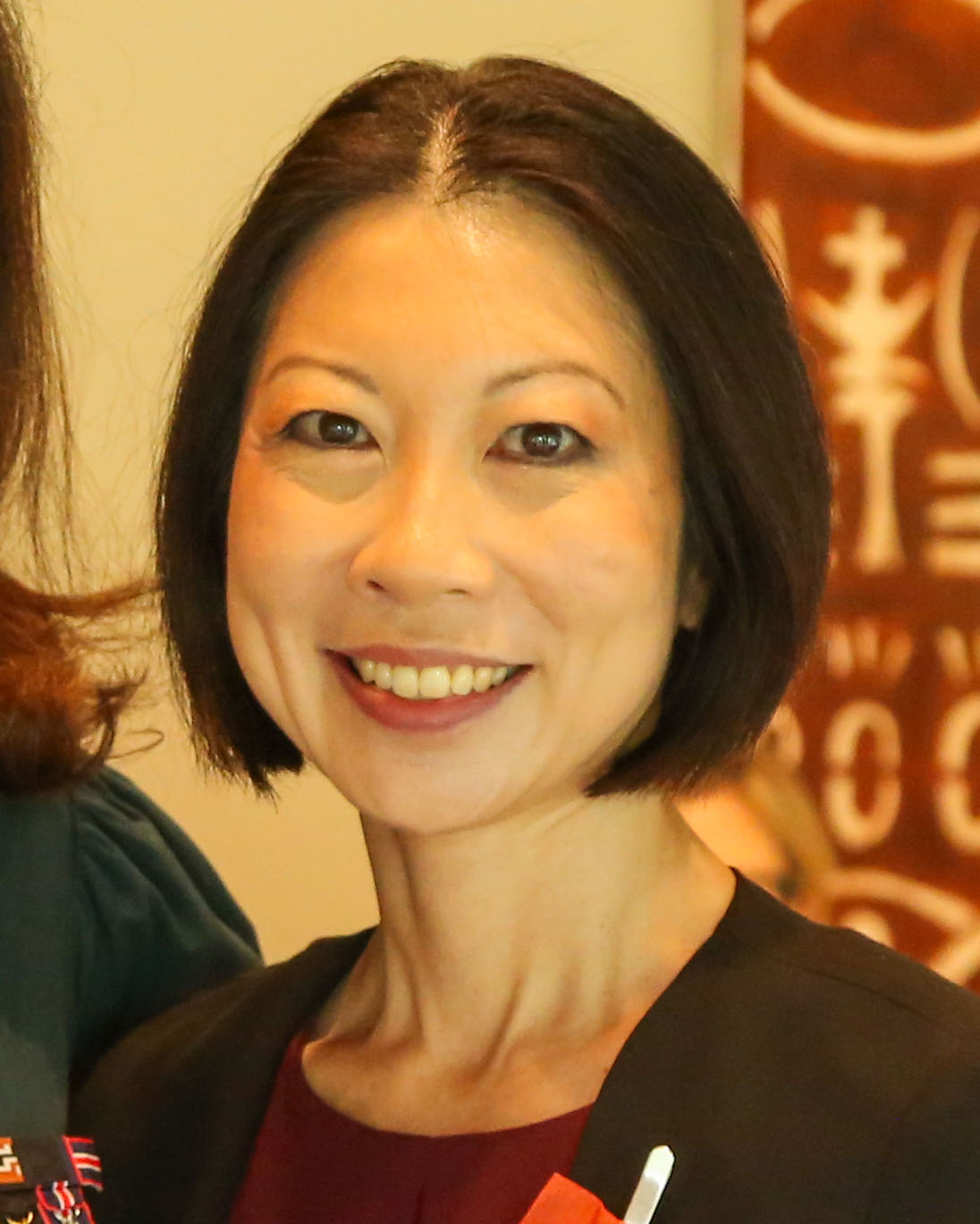
Audrey Tan

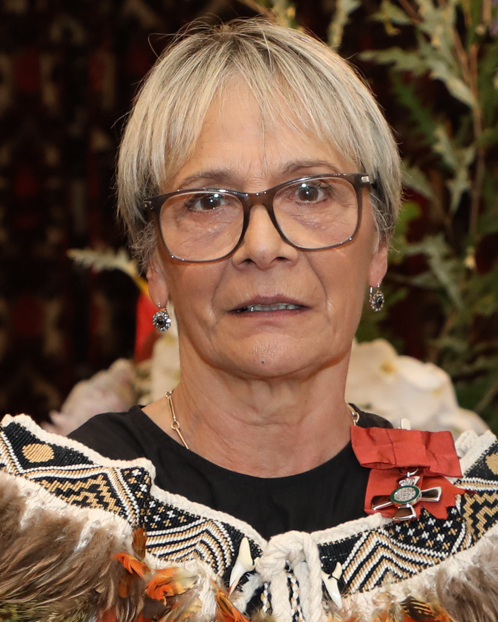
Gail Thompson

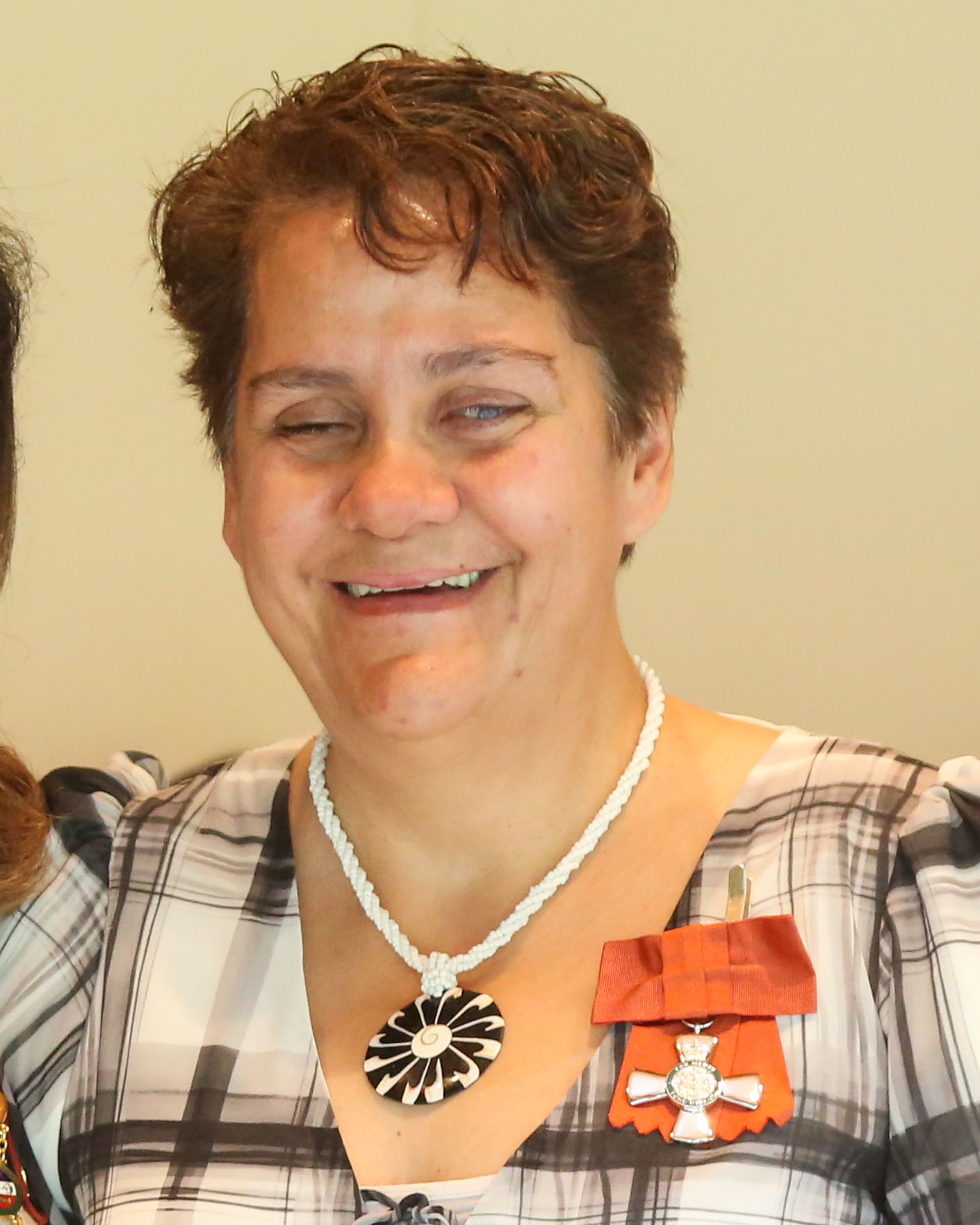
Helena Tuteao

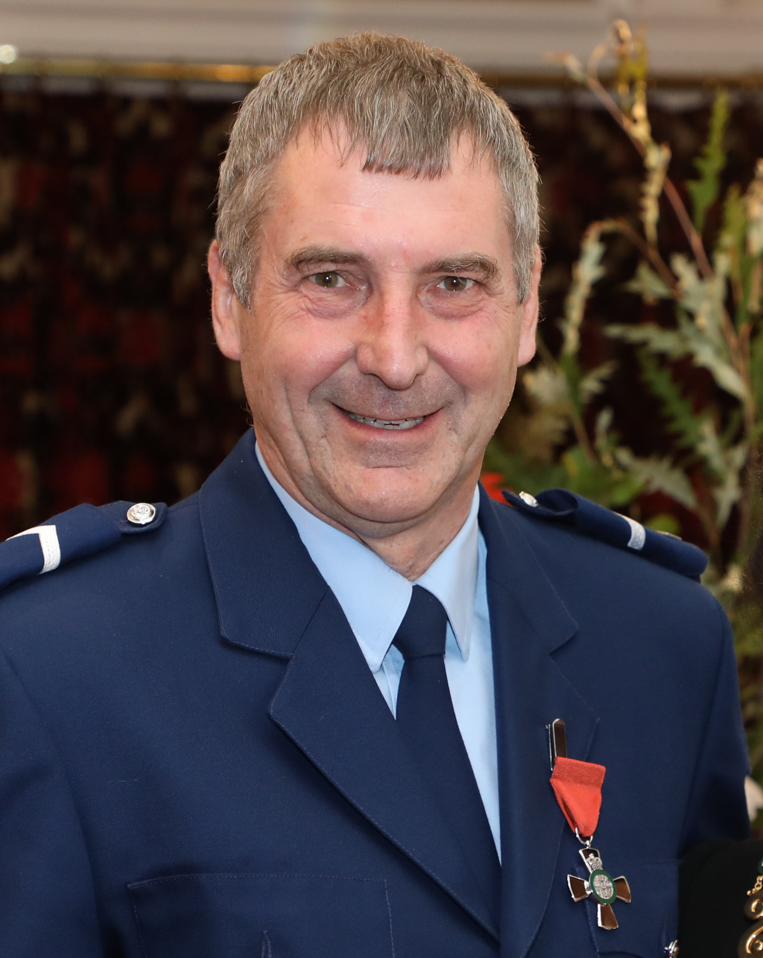
Grant Watts

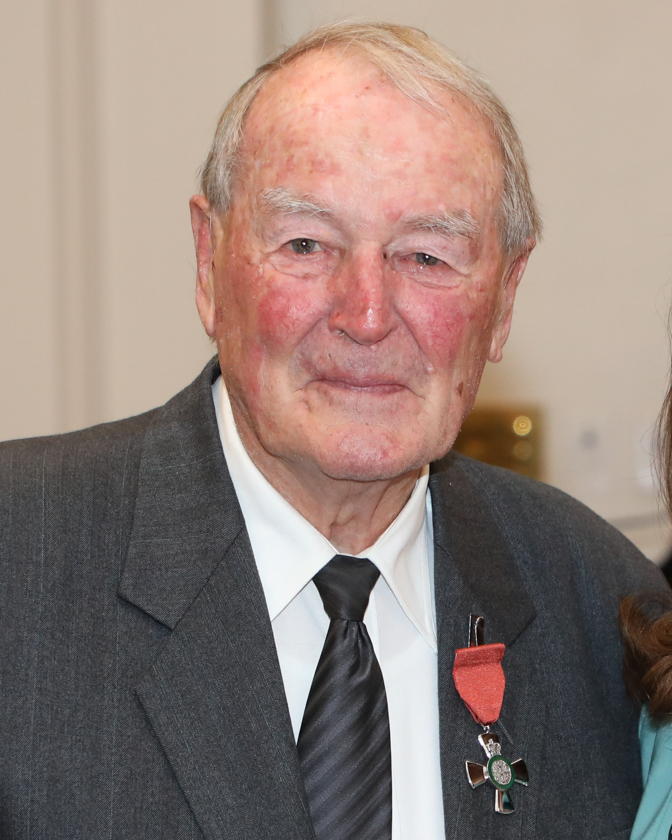
Ian Welch

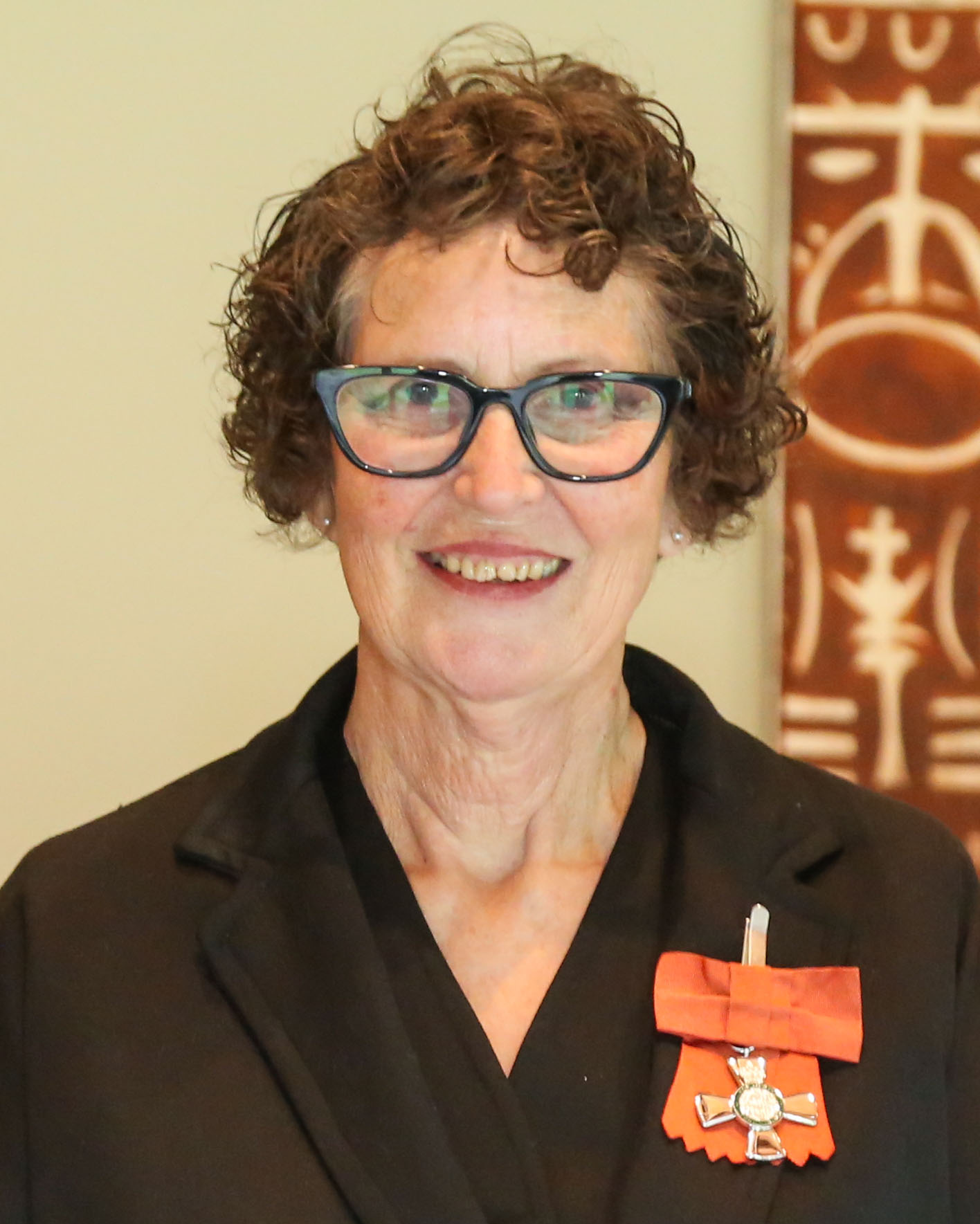
Elizabeth Whiting

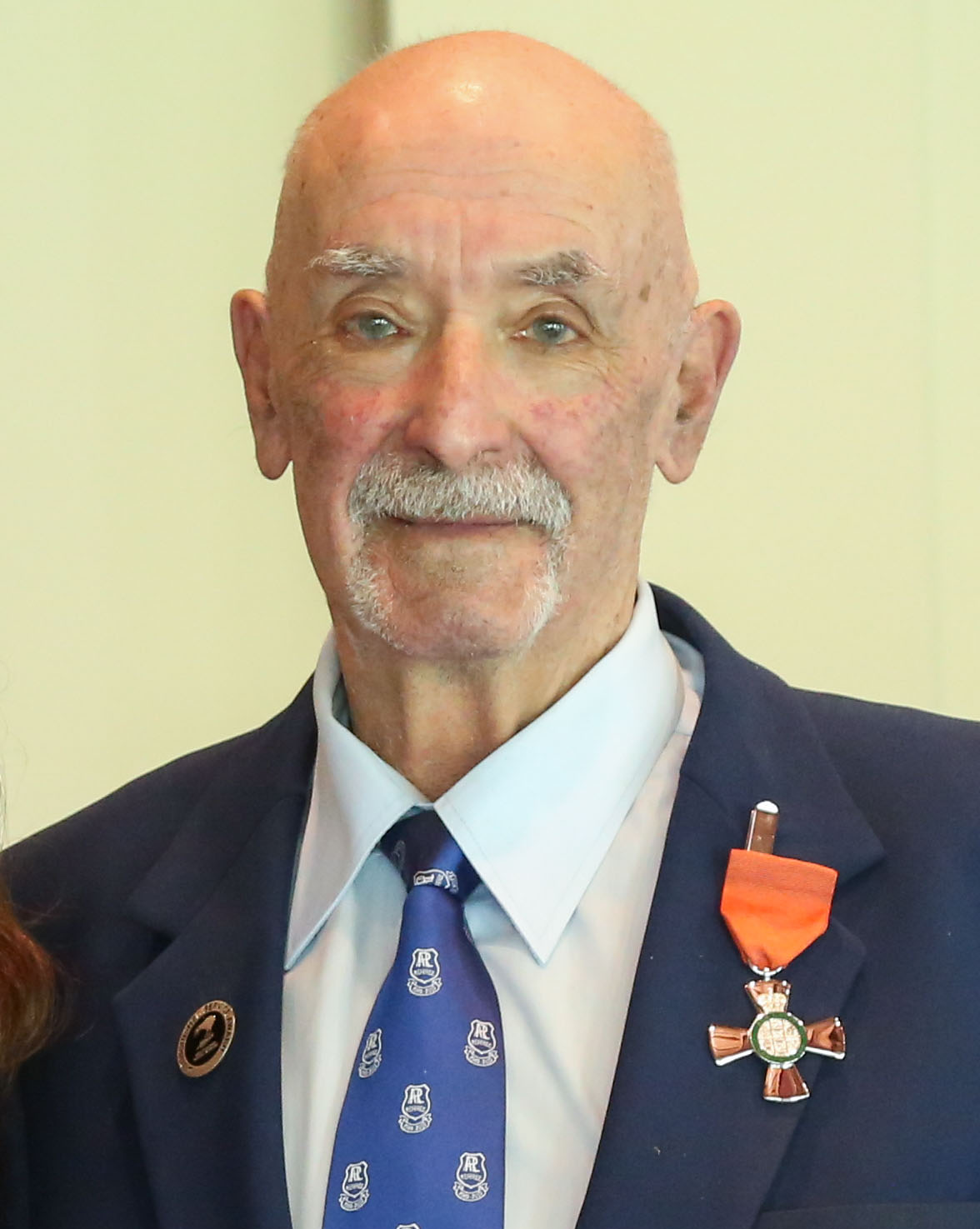
Gary Whittle

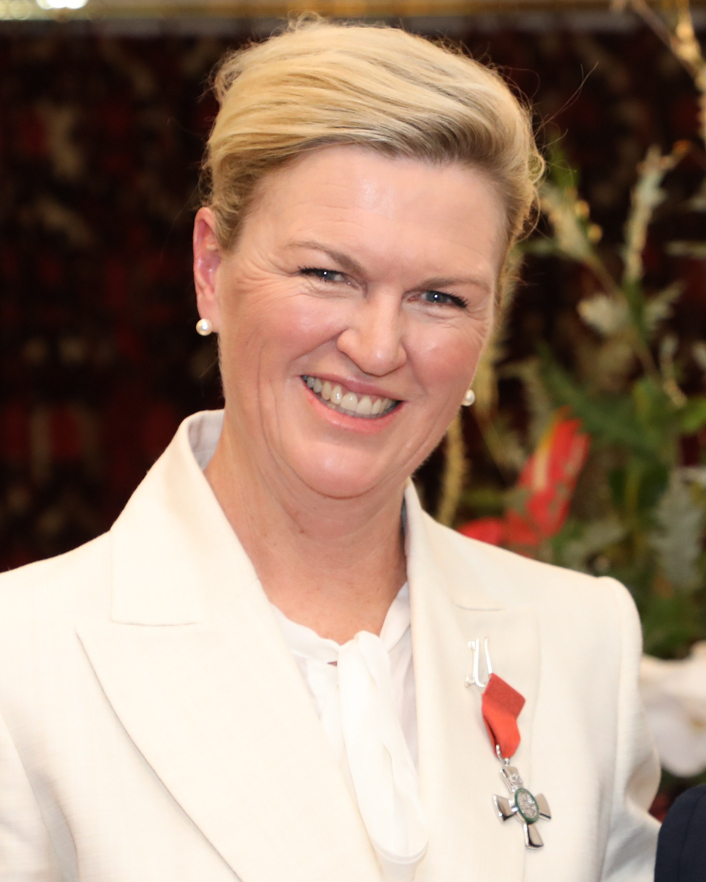
Sarah Wickens

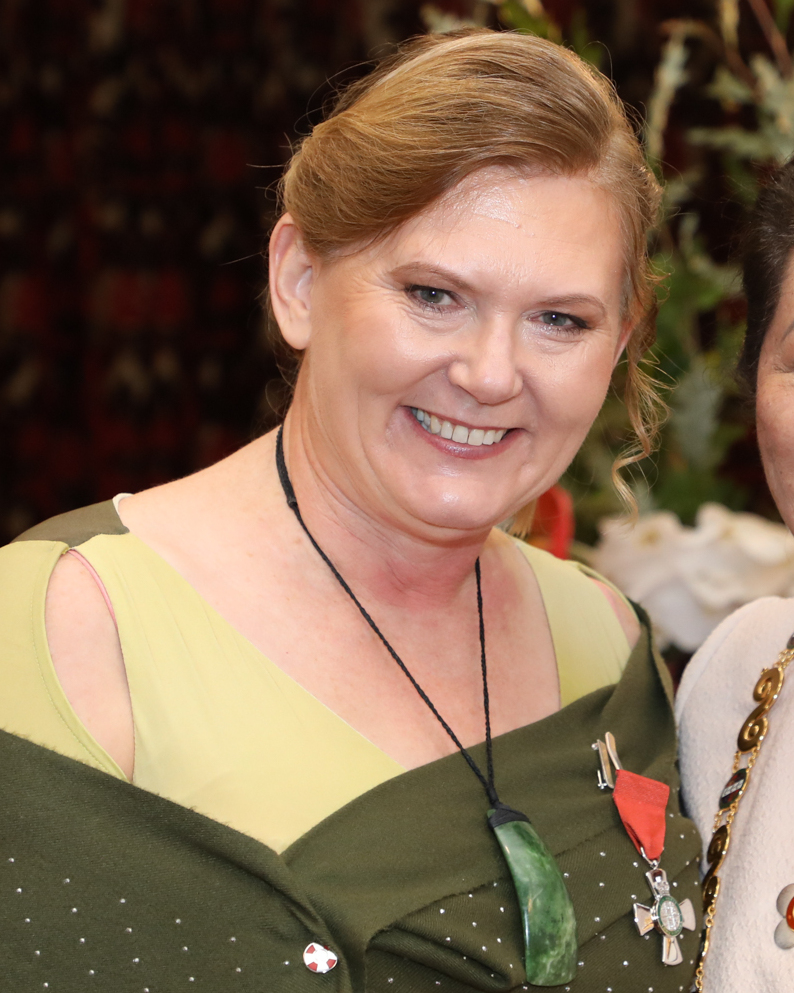
Jane Zintl

== Companion of the King's Service Order (KSO) ==
- Mark Joseph Harawira – of Whakatāne. For services to Māori education, arts and conservation.
- Kerry Ann Nickels – of Remuera. For services to the Red Cross.
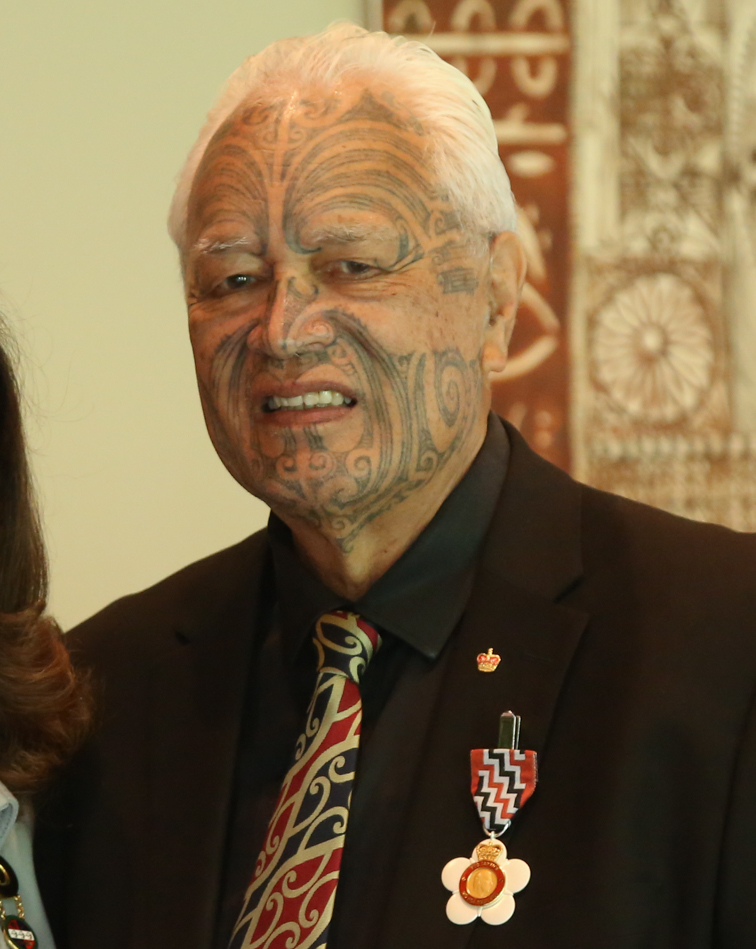
Joe Harawira

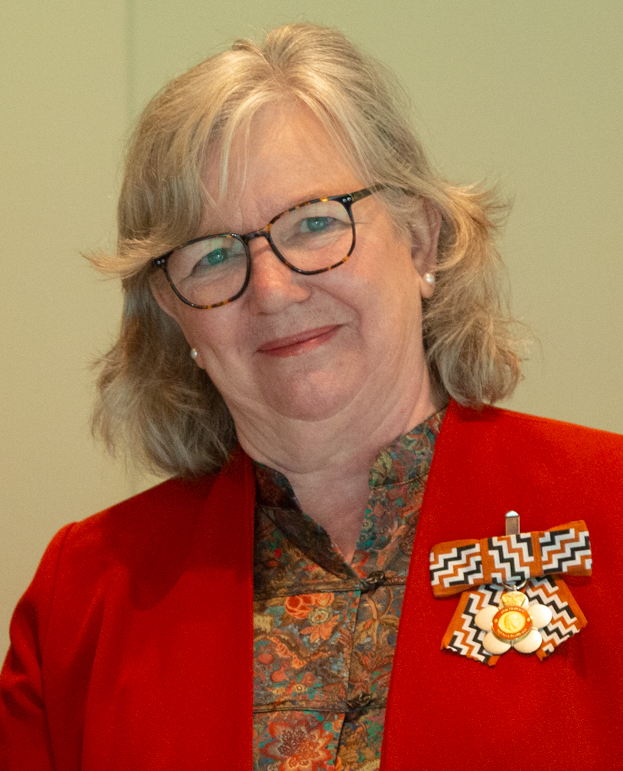
Kerry Nickels

== King's Service Medal (KSM) ==
- Carol Angland – of Wānaka. For services to the community and theatre.
- Bonita Joanne Bigham – of Manaia. For services to local government and Māori.
- Douglas James Brenssell – of Oamaru. For services to the community.
- Robyn Ann Bruce – of Maungaturoto. For services to youth and sport.
- John Randall Burgess – of Mosgiel. For services to the community.
- Marin Burgess – of Farm Cove. For services to heritage preservation and education.
- Emily Myra Caldwell – of Te Aroha. For services to the community and music.
- Marjorie Eleanor Carr – of Ōtorohanga. For services to netball and the community.
- Lloyd Bertram Clausen MStJ – of Leeston. For services to Fire and Emergency New Zealand and the community.
- Edwin Frederick Ruthven Cooke – of Greytown. For services to music.
- Juliet Anne Cooke – of Greytown. For services to music.
- Helen Rose Cooper – of Bulls. For services to the community.
- Richard John Craig – of Kaikōura. For services to the Coastguard.
- Anneke Jacoba Dinnington – of Taupō. For services to seniors and the community.
- David Alyn Drake – of Rolleston. For services to community.
- John Matthew Eaden – of Marton. For services to the arts.
- Graeme Leslie Elliot – of Shiel Hill. For services to the community and outdoor recreation.
- Marion Kennedy Ellis – of Orewa. For services to hockey.
- Elizabeth Mary Fletcher – of Rotorua. For services to the community, particularly wastewater advocacy.
- William Robert Fuller JP – of Russell. For services to the community.
- Leonidas Angelos Gambitsis – of Lower Hutt. For services to the Greek community.
- Trevor James Goudie – of Alexandra. For services to theatre and the community.
- Jocelyn Mary Grantham – of Grafton. For services to education and the community.
- Sheridan Isobel Patrice Gundry – of Gisborne. For services to historical research and heritage preservation.
- Paul David Harris JP – of Amberley. For services to Fire and Emergency New Zealand and the community.
- Elizabeth Janet Henry – of Invercargill. For services to the community and sport.
- David John Jurlina – of Kaitaia. For services to rugby and the community.
- Nada Linda Jurlina – of Kaitaia. For services to rugby and the community.
- Gurpreet Kaur – of The Gardens. For services to the Indian community.
- Barbara Joy Knowles JP – of Onewhero. For services to the community and members of Parliament.
- Peter Alan Maunder – of Paeroa. For services to athletics.
- Sylvia Mary Joyce Maunder – of Paeroa. For services to athletics.
- Laurie Owen Mills – of Sunnyhills. For services to theatre.
- Mohan Durlabh Mistry – of Kingston. For services to the Indian community.
- Gordon Leonard Myer JP – of Golflands. For services to the community.
- Aere Anne Nicholas JP – of Papatoetoe. For services to the community.
- Patrick Gerard O'Rourke – of Napier. For services to Fire and Emergency New Zealand and the community.
- Dr Tania Anne Pinfold – of Te Aro. For services to youth health.
- Enatuleni Ikitoa Polima – of Massey. For services to the Niuean community.
- Jacqueline Robertson – of Paihia. For services to science education.
- Stanley Donald Scott – of Wairoa. For services to Fire and Emergency New Zealand and civil defence.
- Christopher Sharp – of Gisborne. For services to Search and Rescue and outdoor recreation.
- Ruth Philliss Shaw – of Manapouri. For services to conservation.
- Dr Leonie Kaye Sinclair – of Rotorua. For services to health.
- Harjinder Singh JP – of Papakura. For services to the Punjabi community.
- Brian Douglas Smith – of Timaru. For services to rowing.
- Sailauama Cheryl Talamaivao JP – of Te Atatū Peninsula. For services to the Pacific community and education.
- The Reverend Wayne Saunoa Moegagogo Toleafoa JP – of Havelock North. For services to Pacific communities.
- Paul Gregory Toms – of Te Aroha. For services to Fire and Emergency New Zealand and football.
- Russel Walter Trow – of Bluff. For services to wildlife conservation.
- Teresa Anne Trow – of Bluff. For services to wildlife conservation.
- Jonathan Usher – of Cromwell. For services to the community and entertainment.
- Norma-Jean Van De Rheede JP – of Melboume, Australia. For services to the community.
- lan Arthur Watts – of Nelson. For services to Land Search and Rescue.
- Henry Joseph Wheeler – of Rongotea. For services to Fire and Emergency New Zealand and the community.
- Delano Shane De Graffe Whyte – of Napier. For services to sport and the community.
- Isabella Wilson – of Queenstown. For services to the community and theatre.
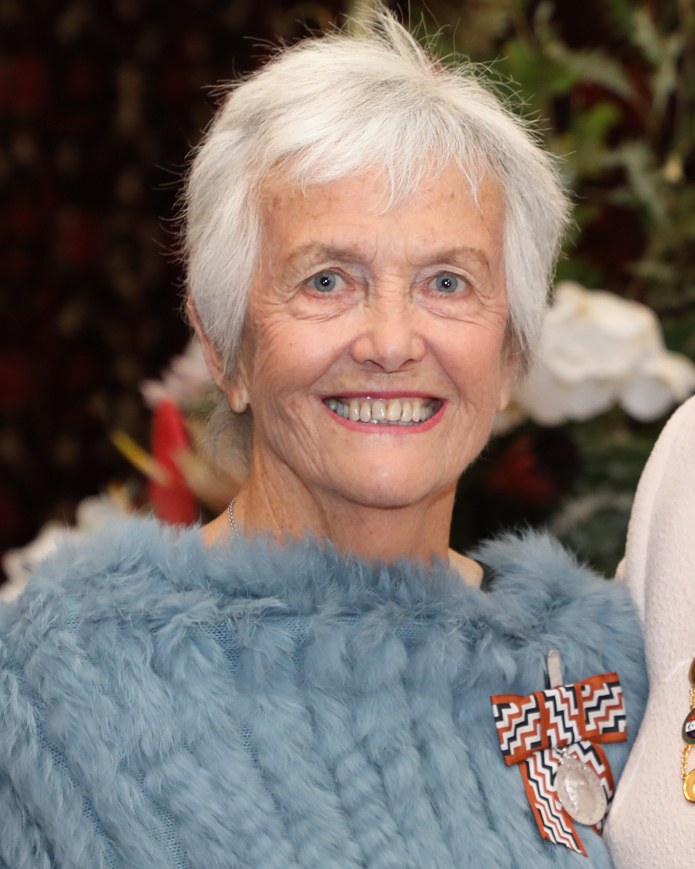
Carol Angland

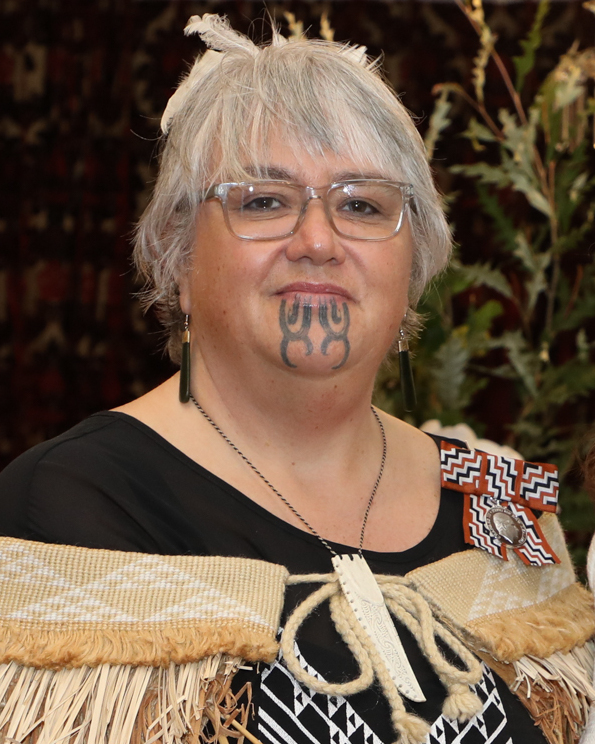
Bonita Bigham

Douglas Brenssell

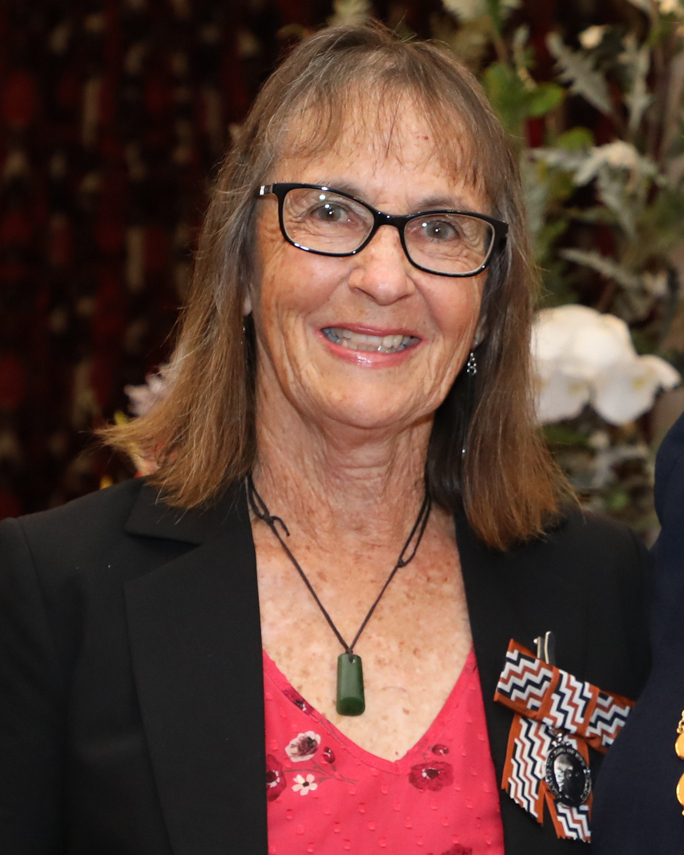
Robyn Bruce

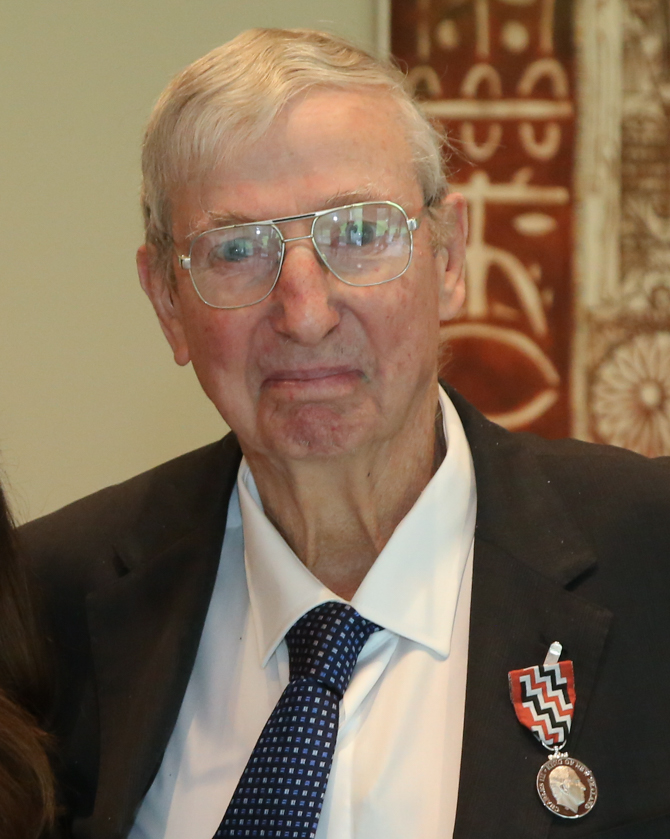
JR Burgess

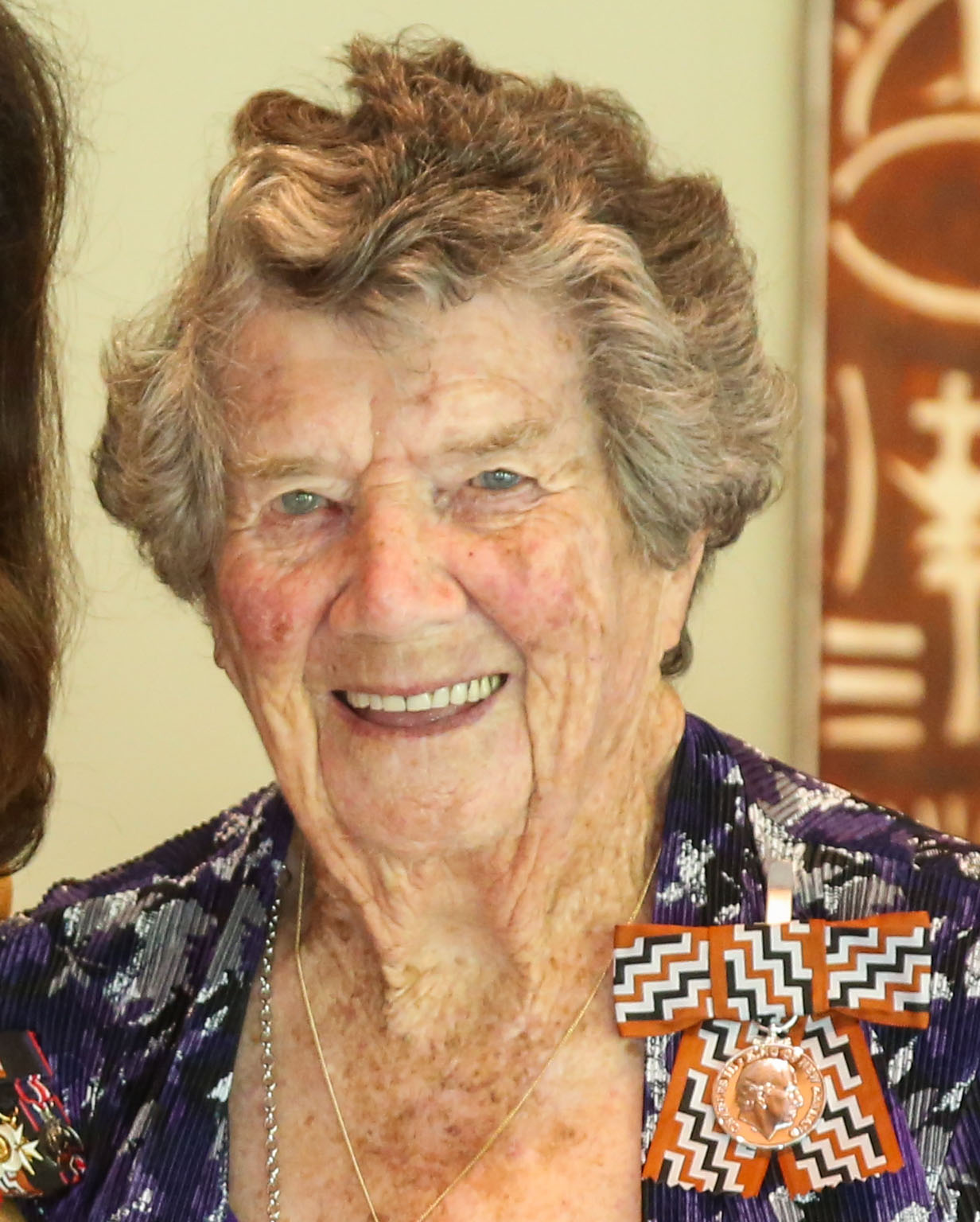
Myra Caldwell

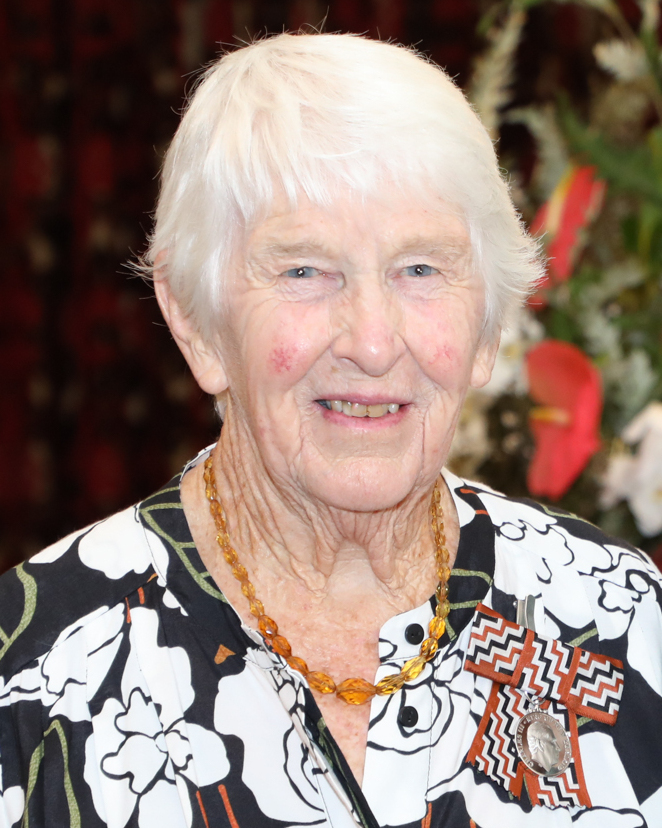
Marjorie Carr

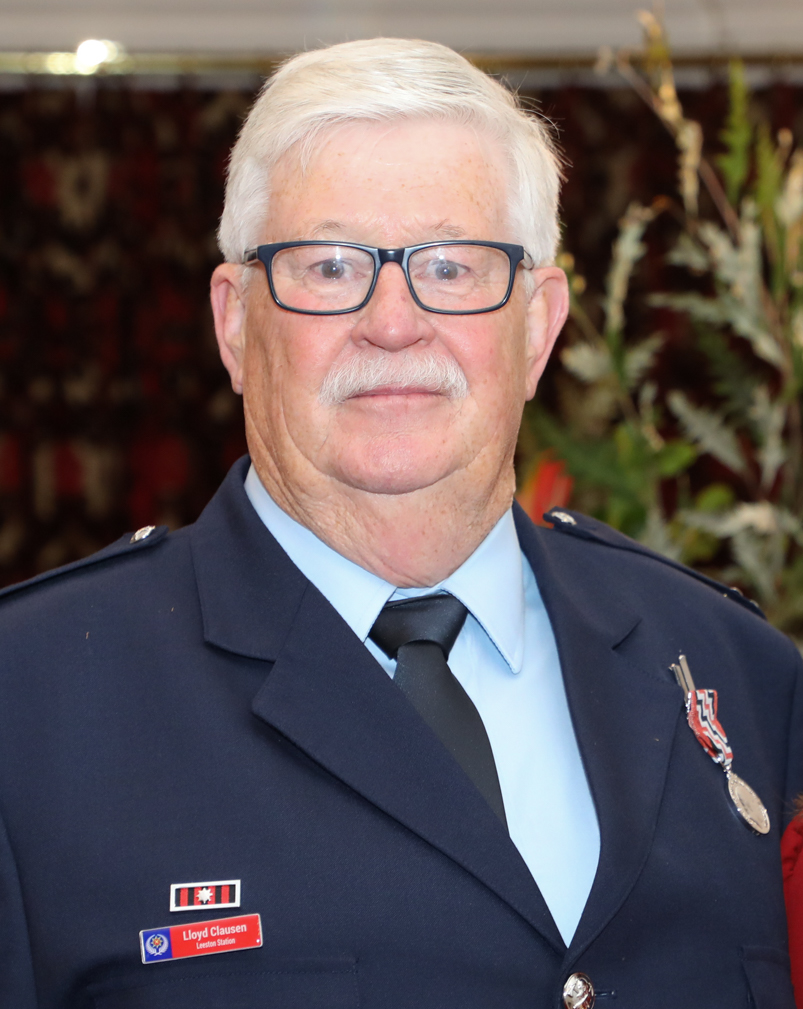
Lloyd Clausen

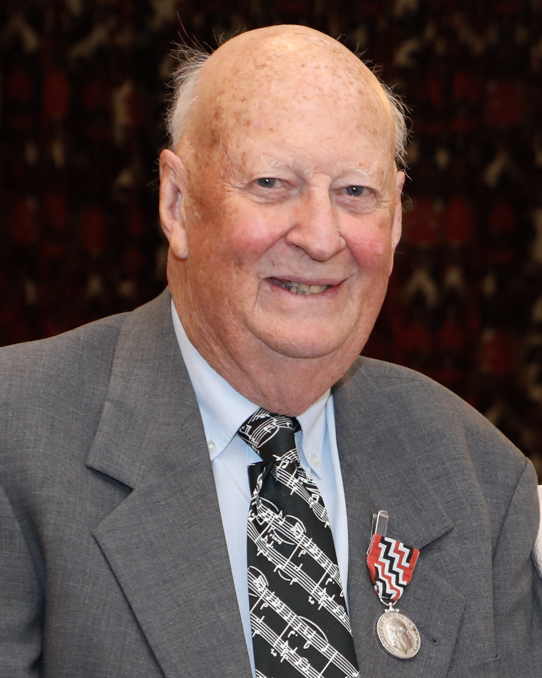
Ed Cooke

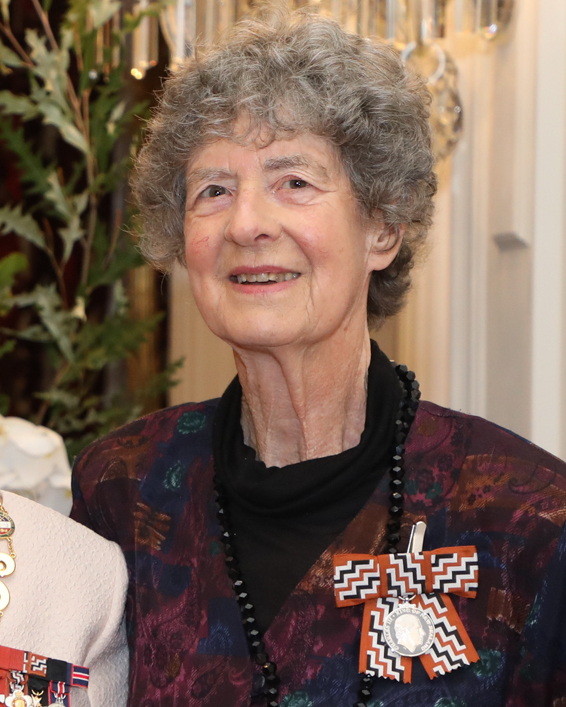
Juliet Cooke

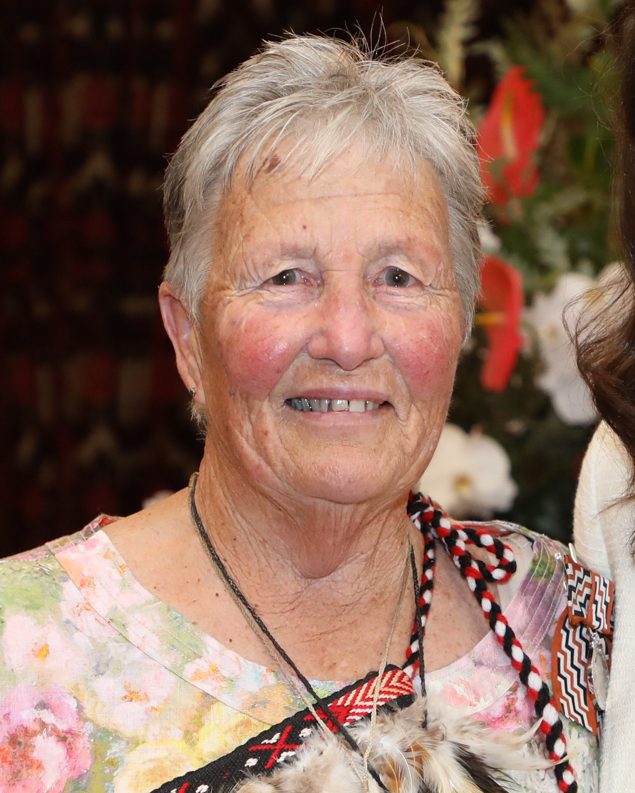
Helen Cooper

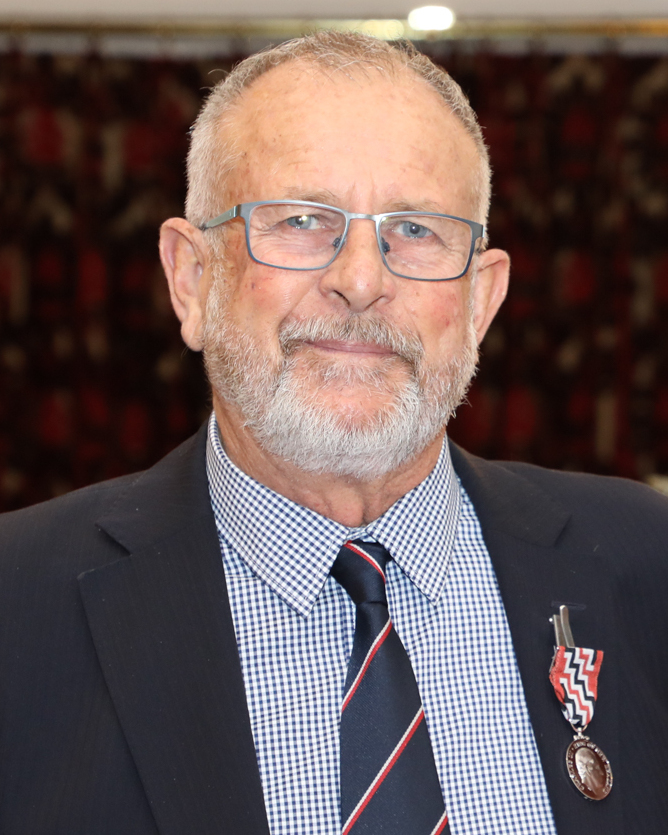
Richard Craig

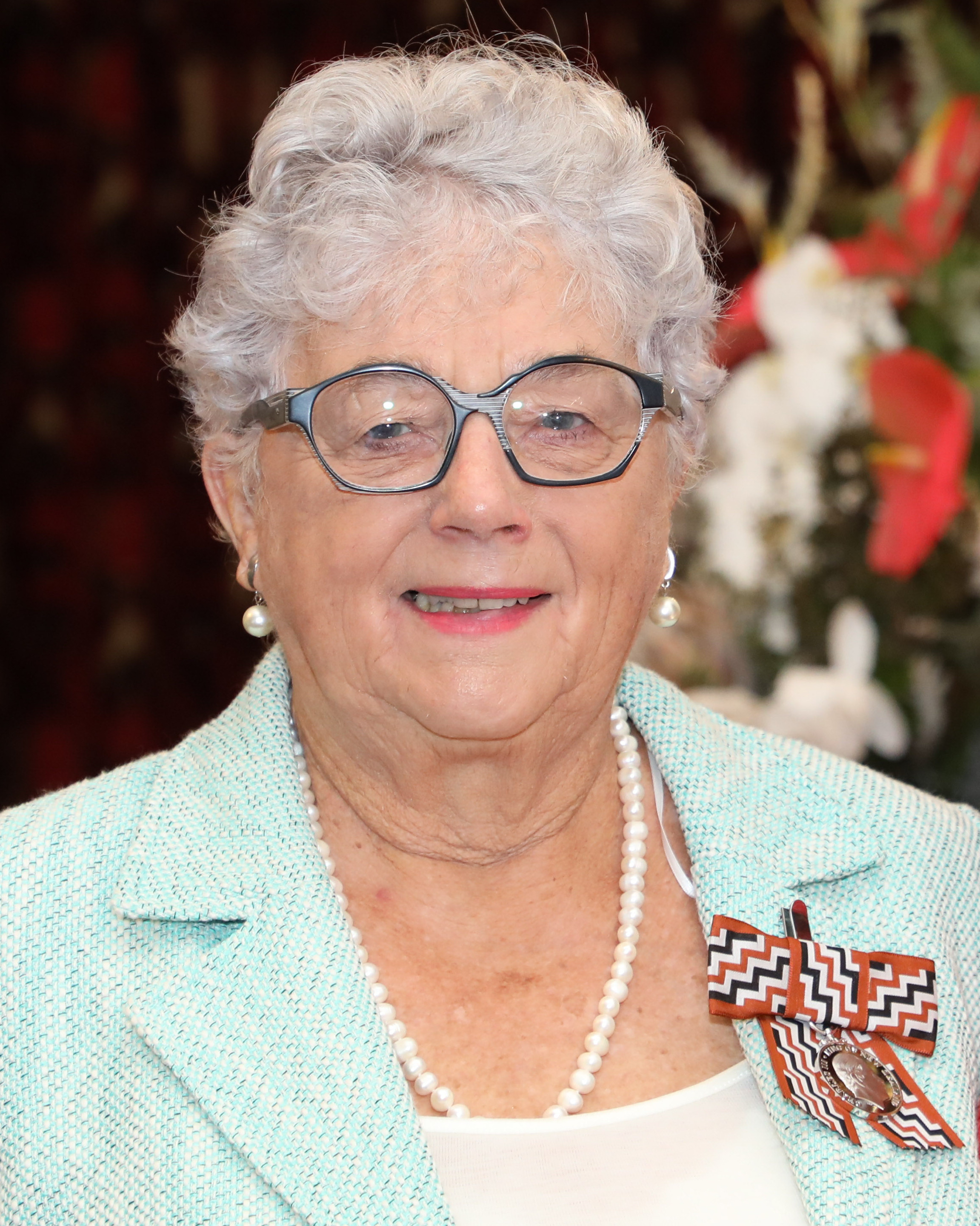
Anneke Dinnington

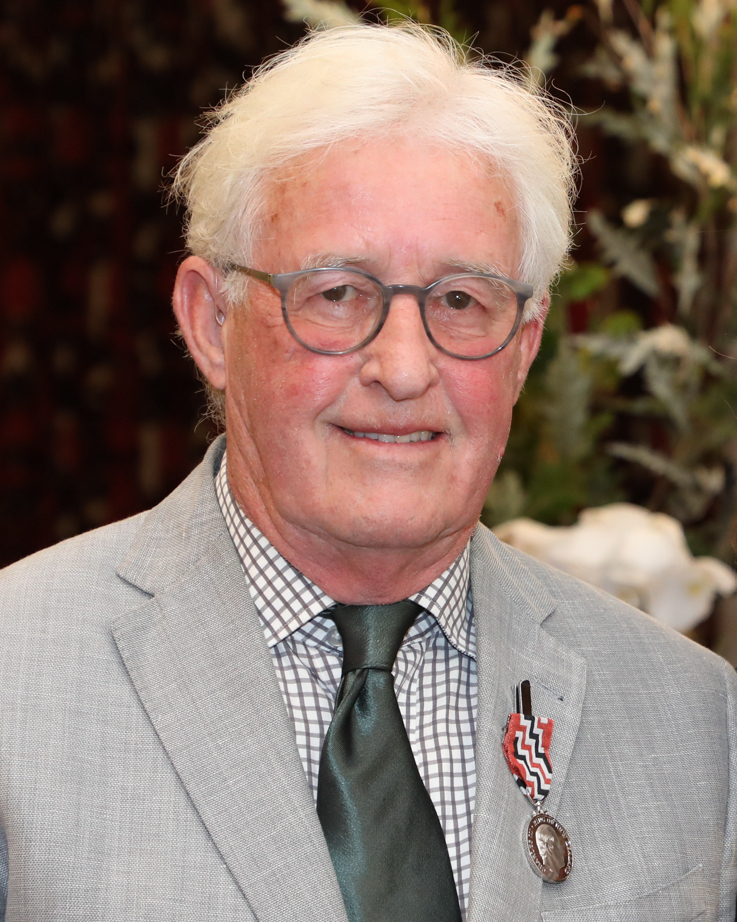
John Eaden

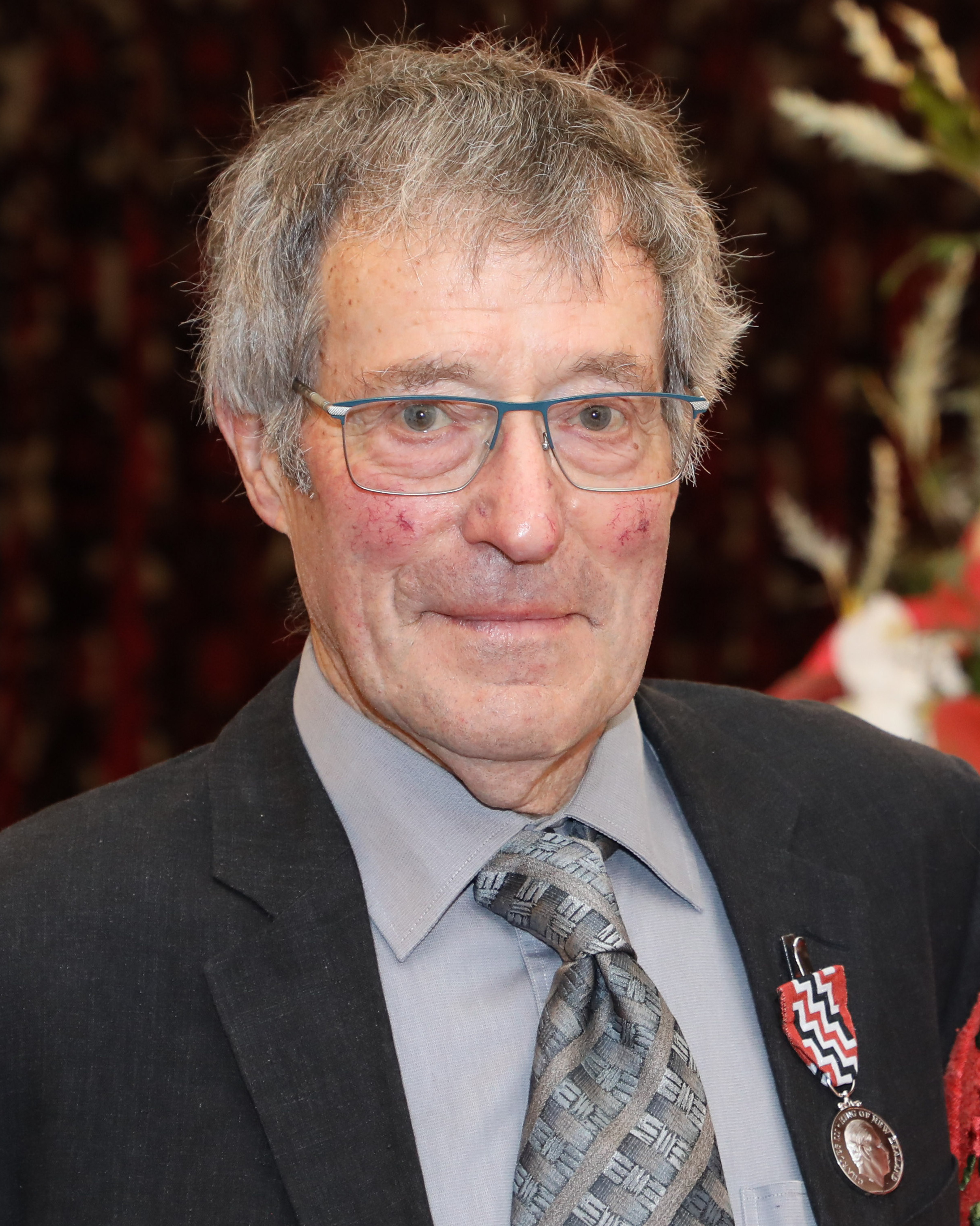
Graeme Elliot

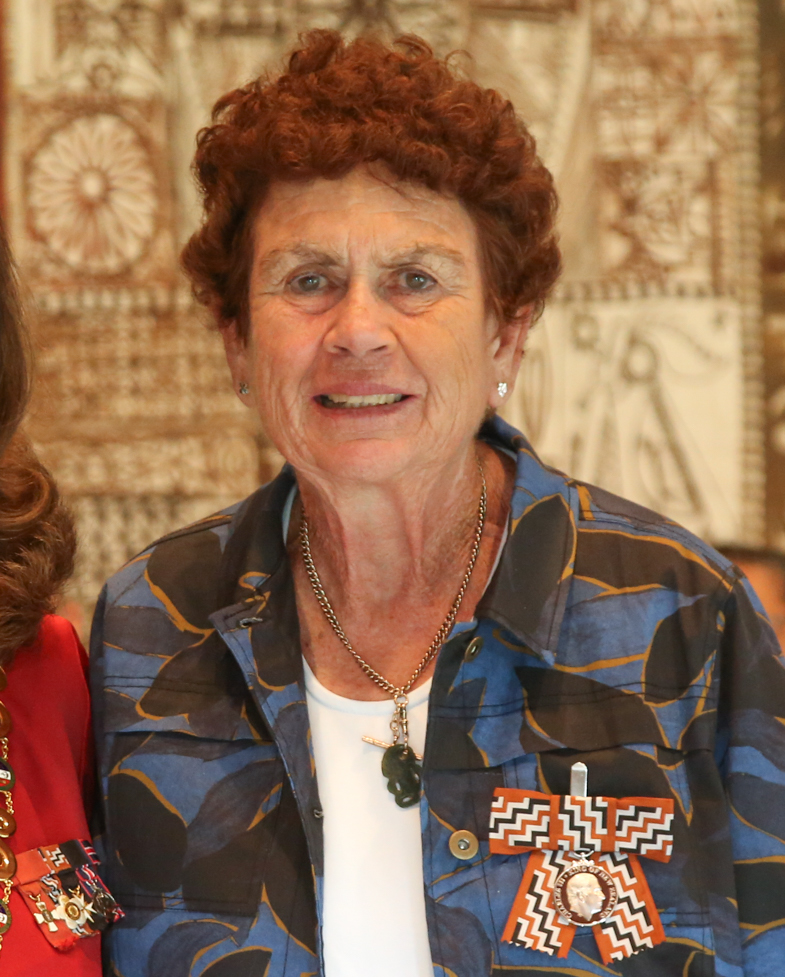
Marion Ellis

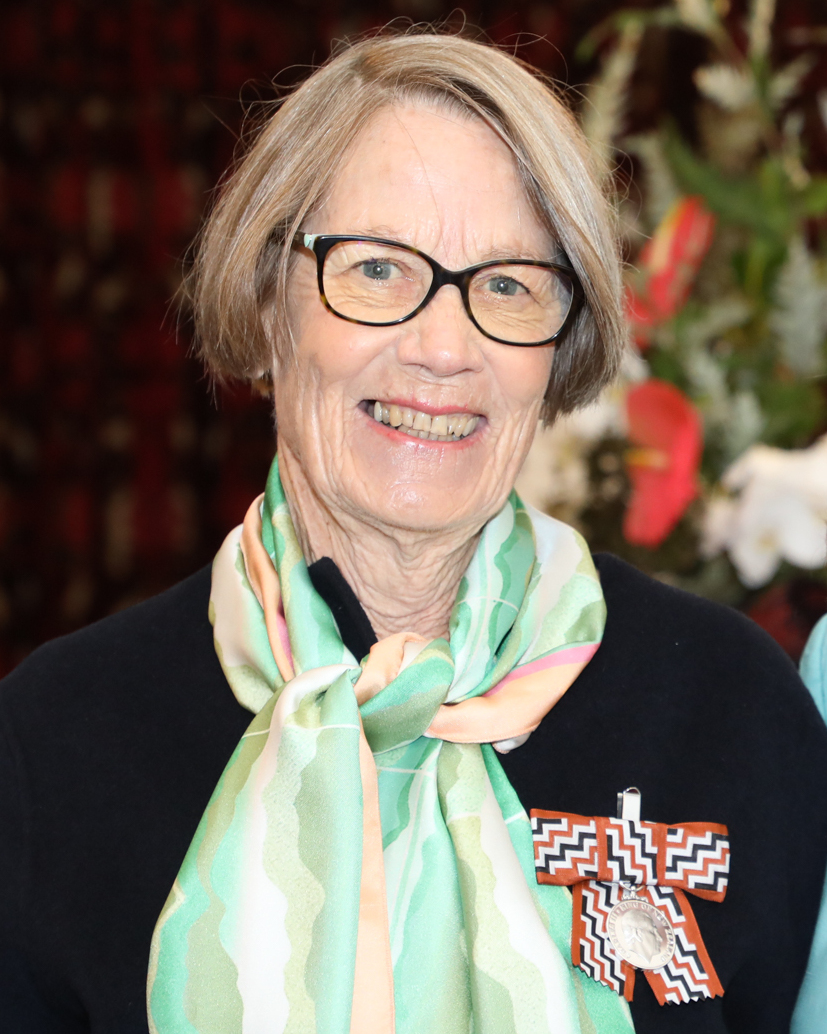
Libby Fletcher

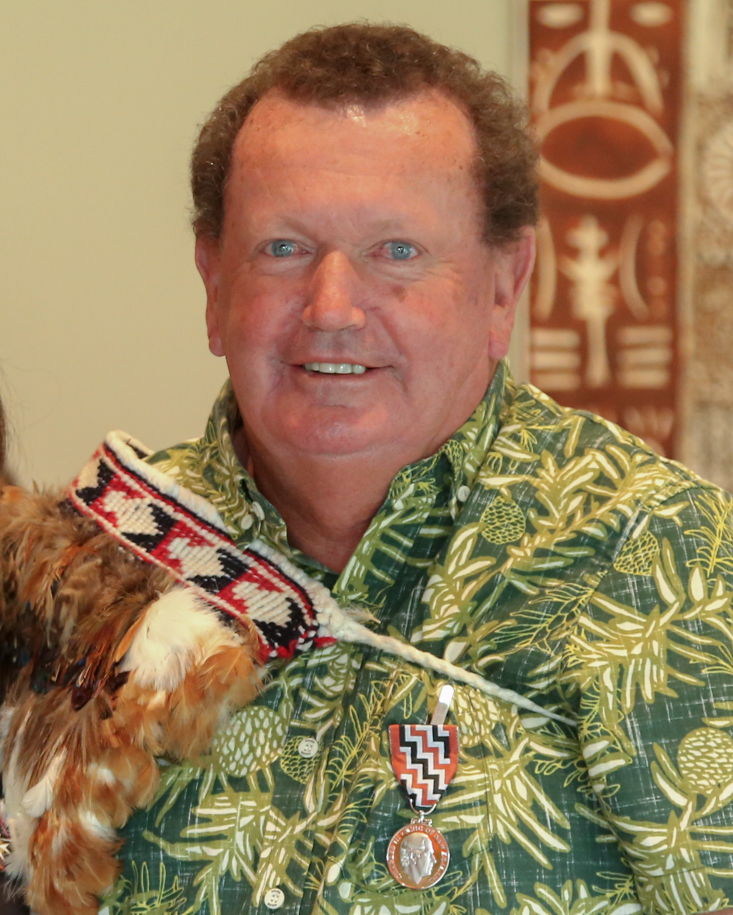
William Fuller

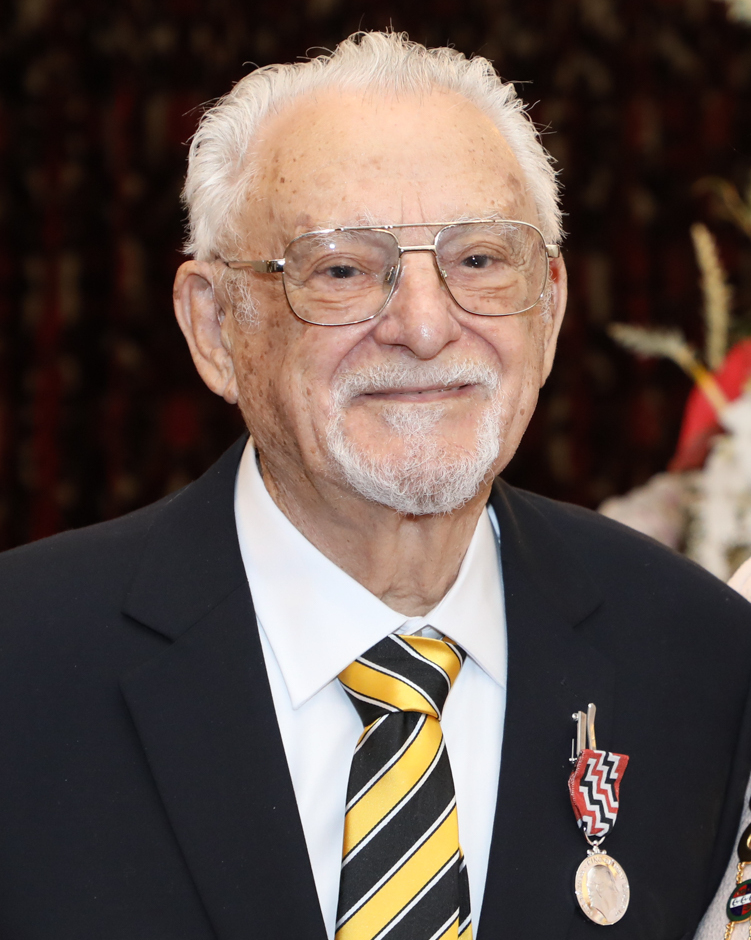
Leo Gambitsis

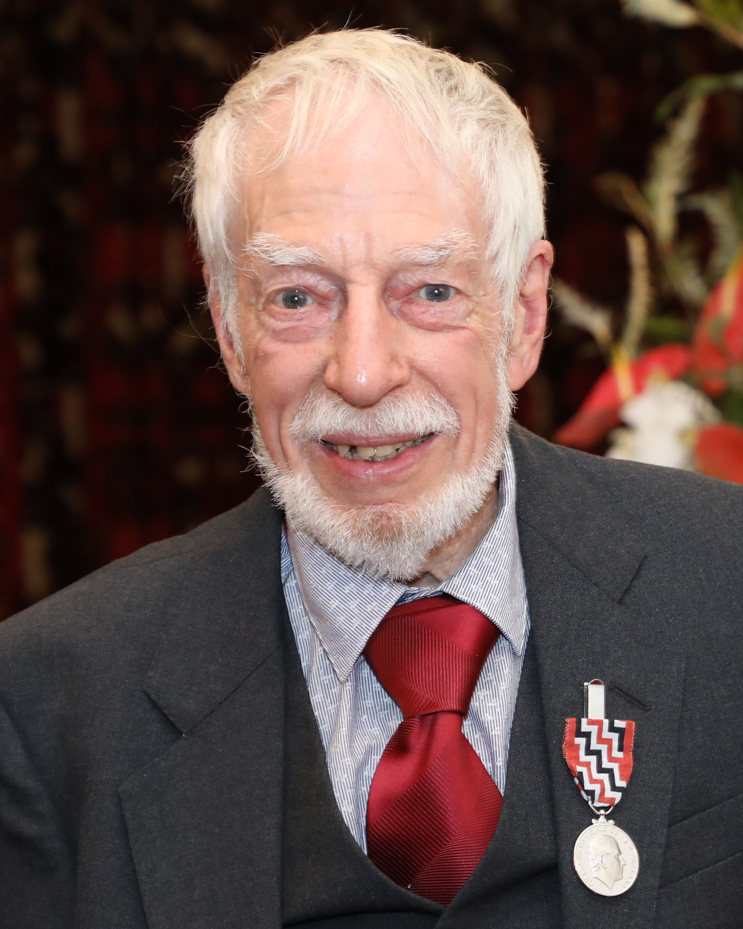
Trevor Goudie

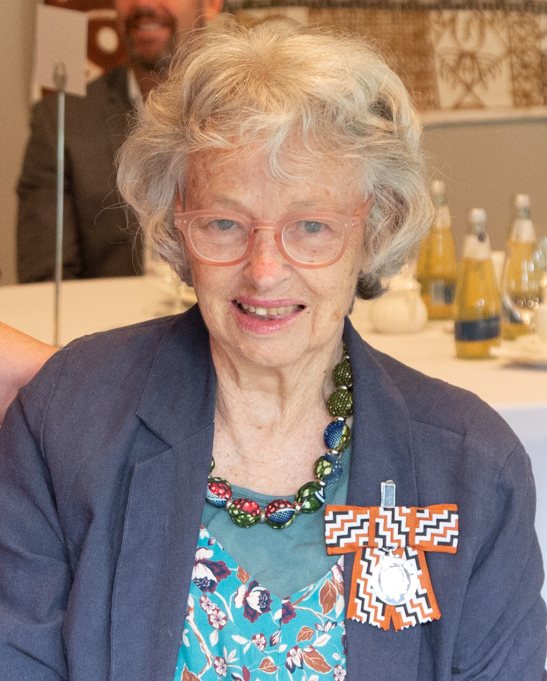
Jocelyn Grantham

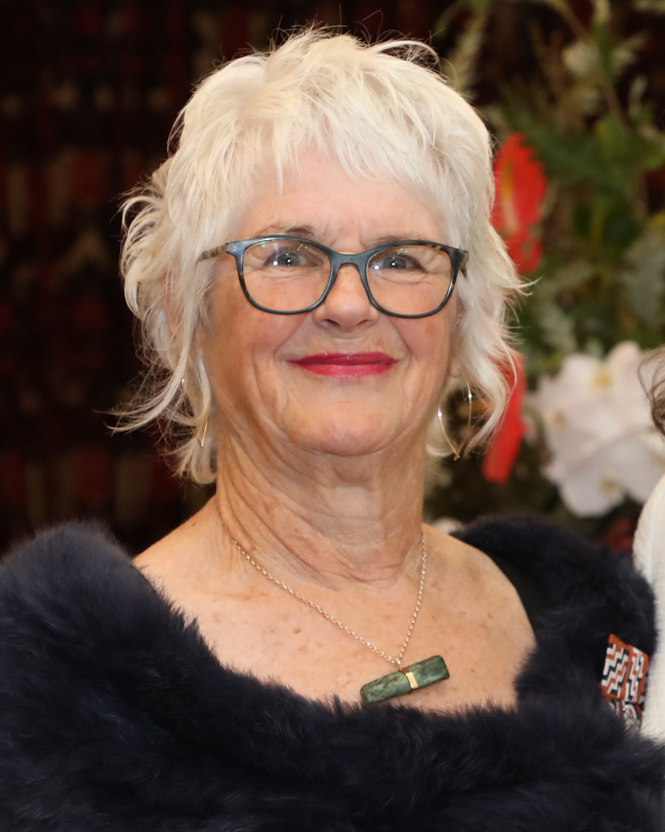
Sheridan Gundry

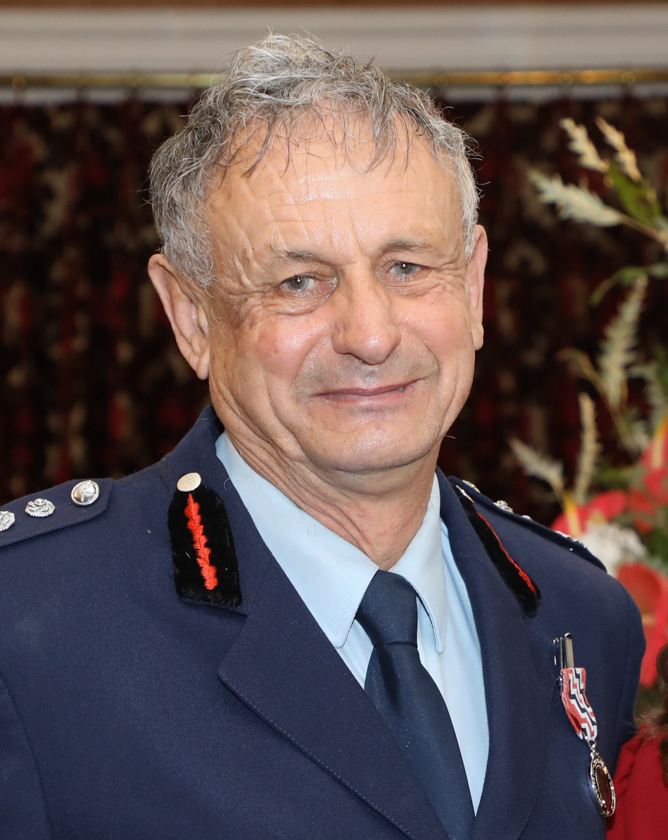
Paul Harris

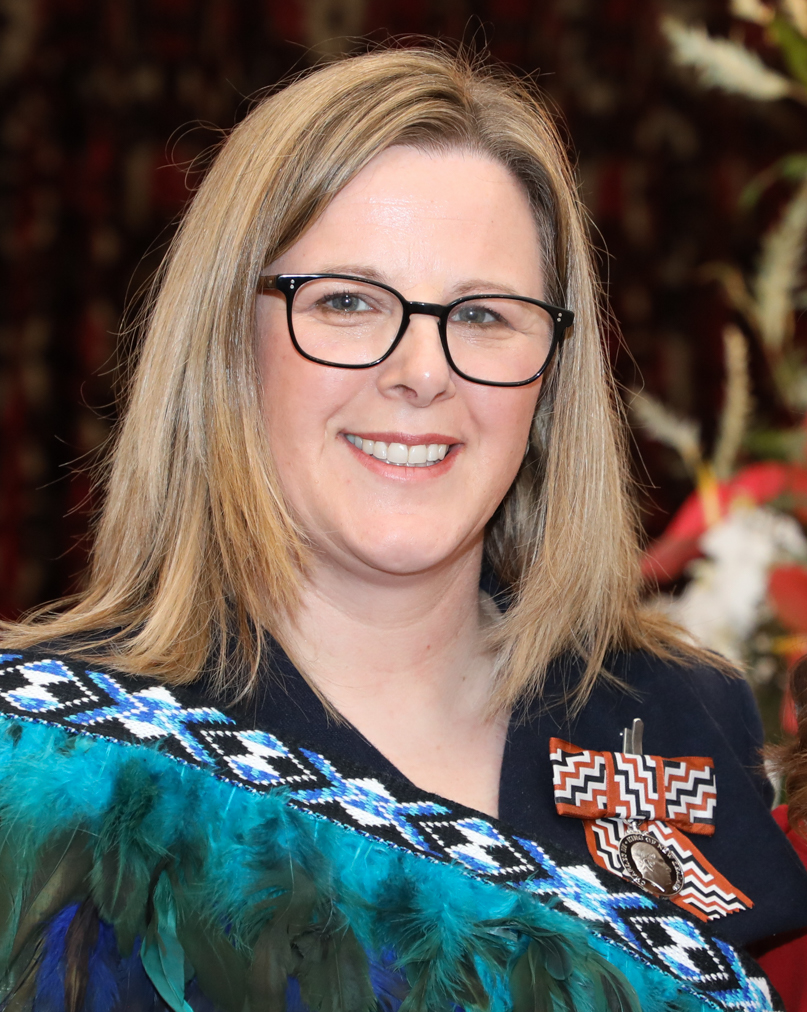
Liz Henry

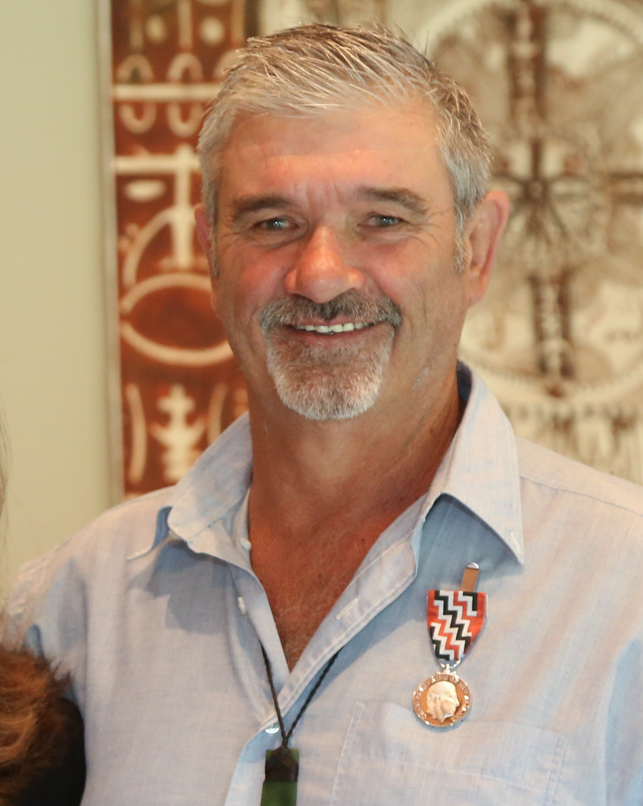
David Jurlina

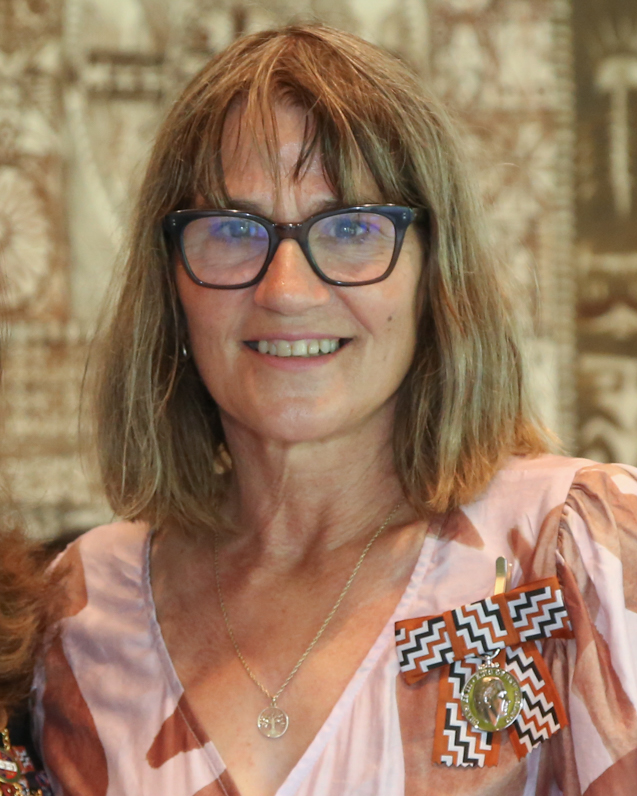
Nada Jurlina

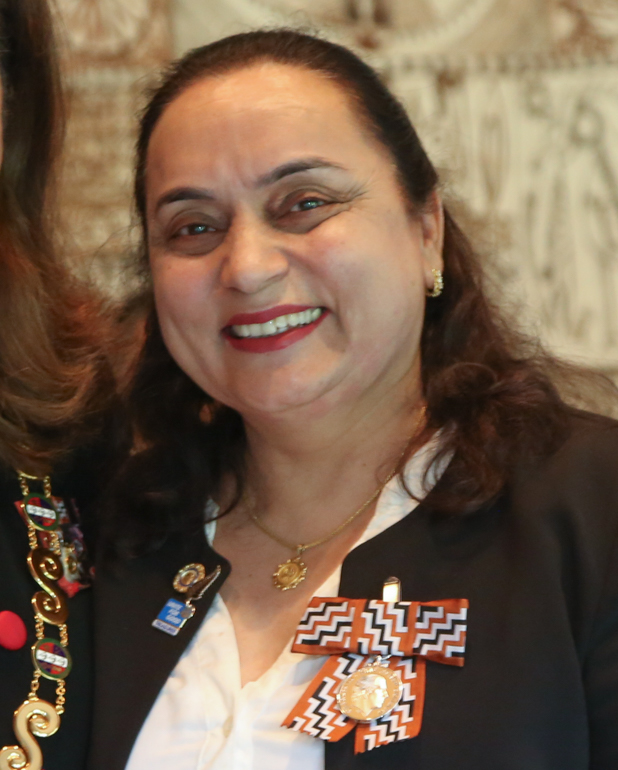
Gurpreet Kaur

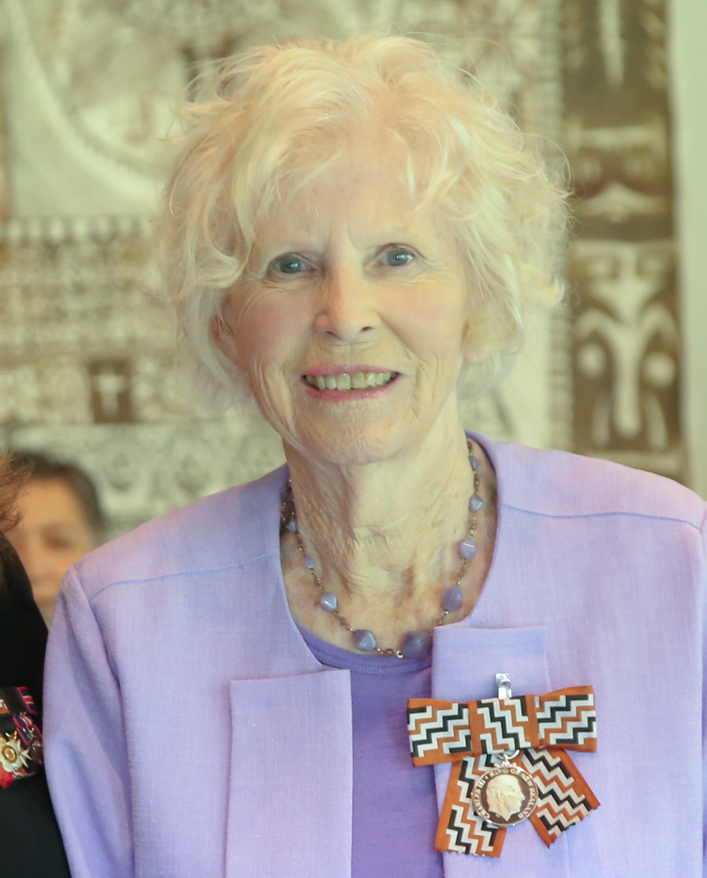
Barbara Knowles

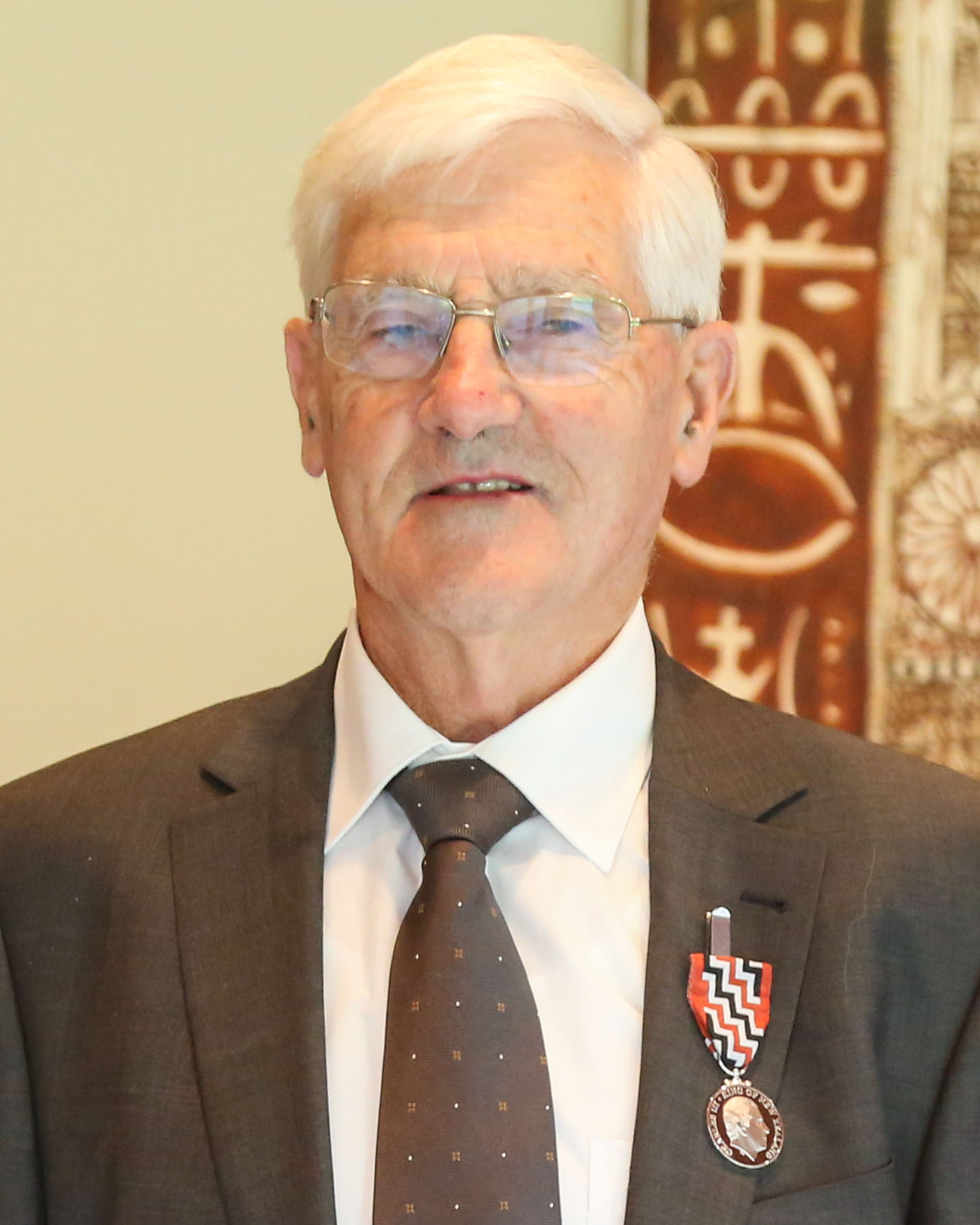
Peter Maunder

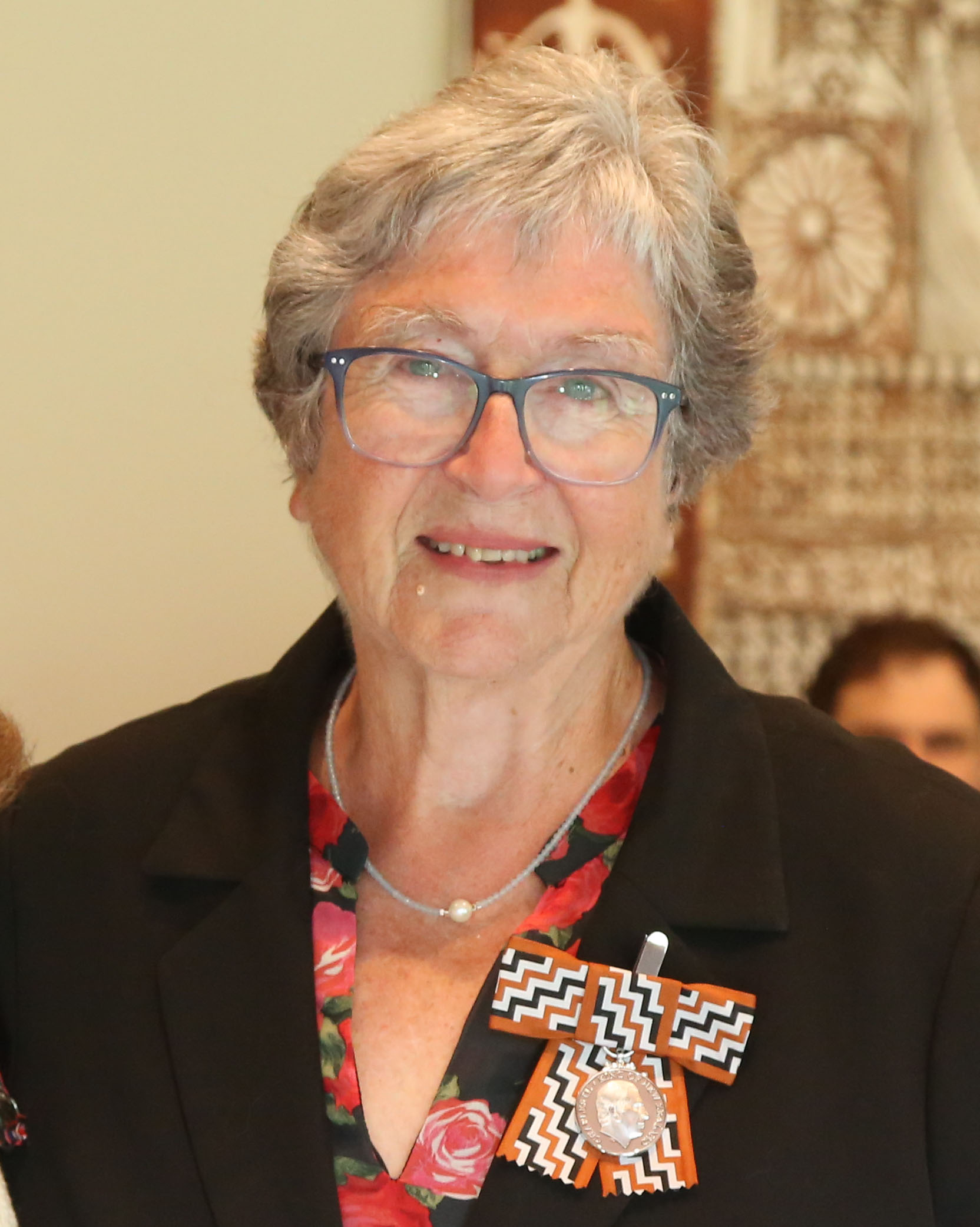
Sylvia Maunder

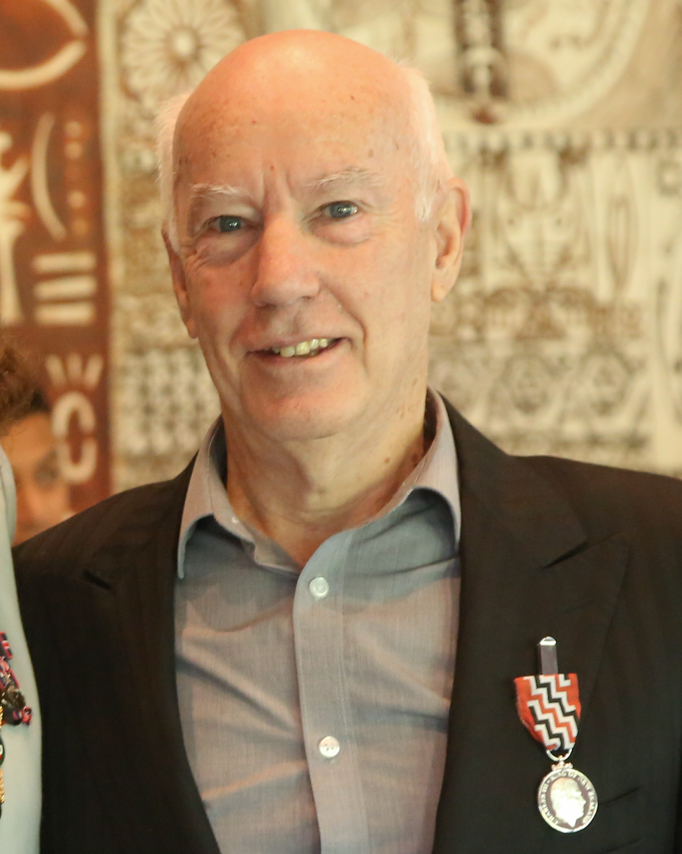
Laurie Mills

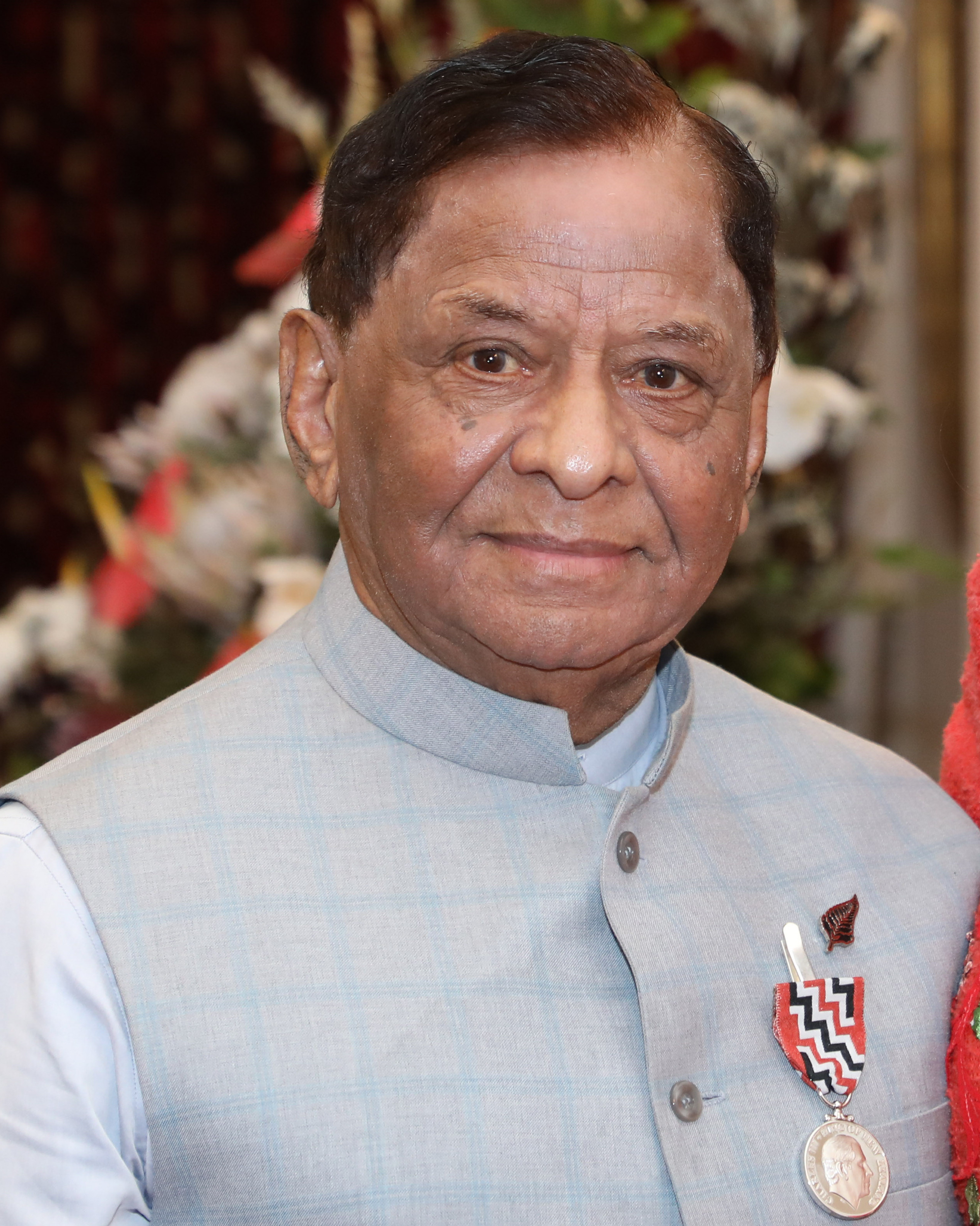
Mohan Mistry

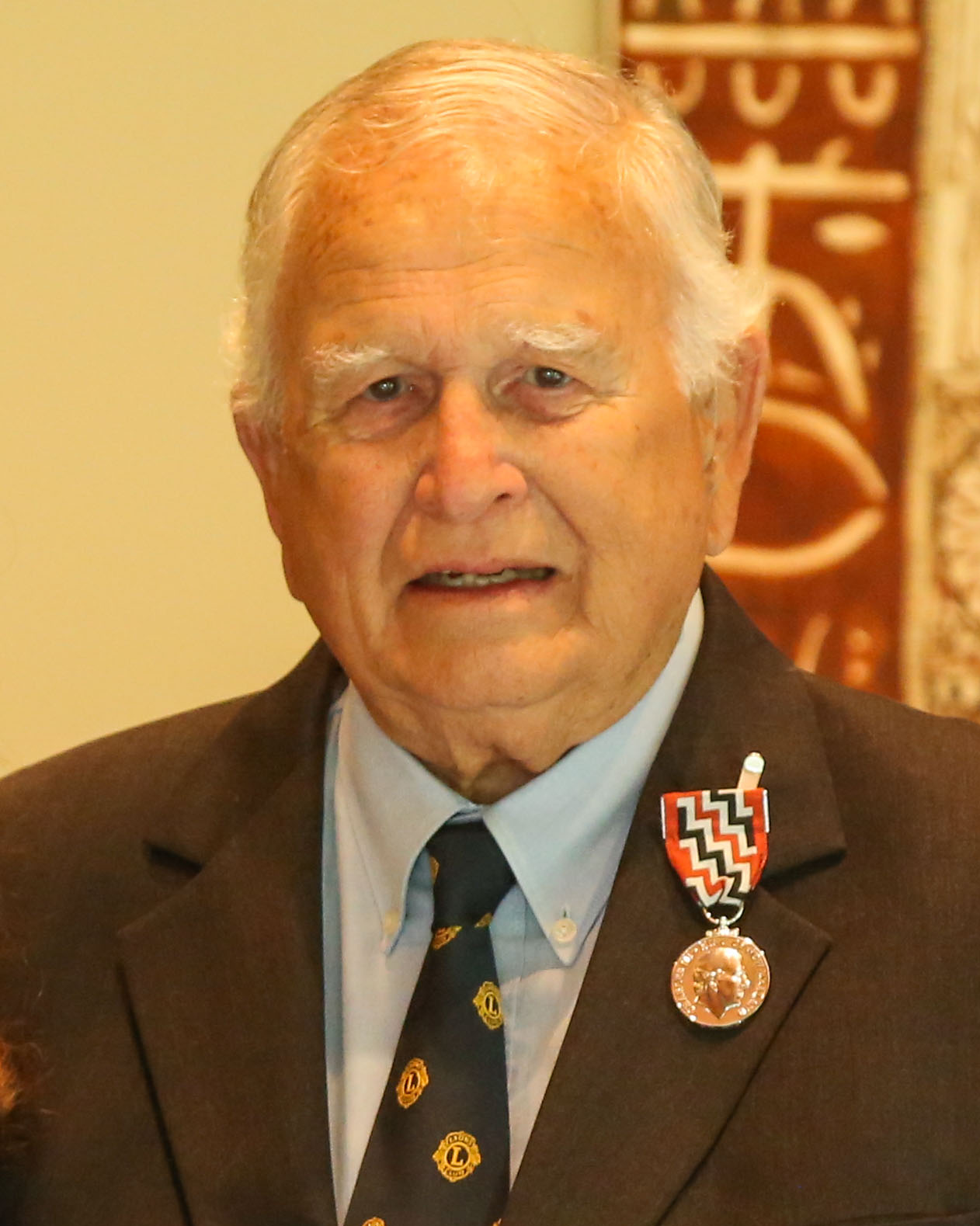
Gordon Myer

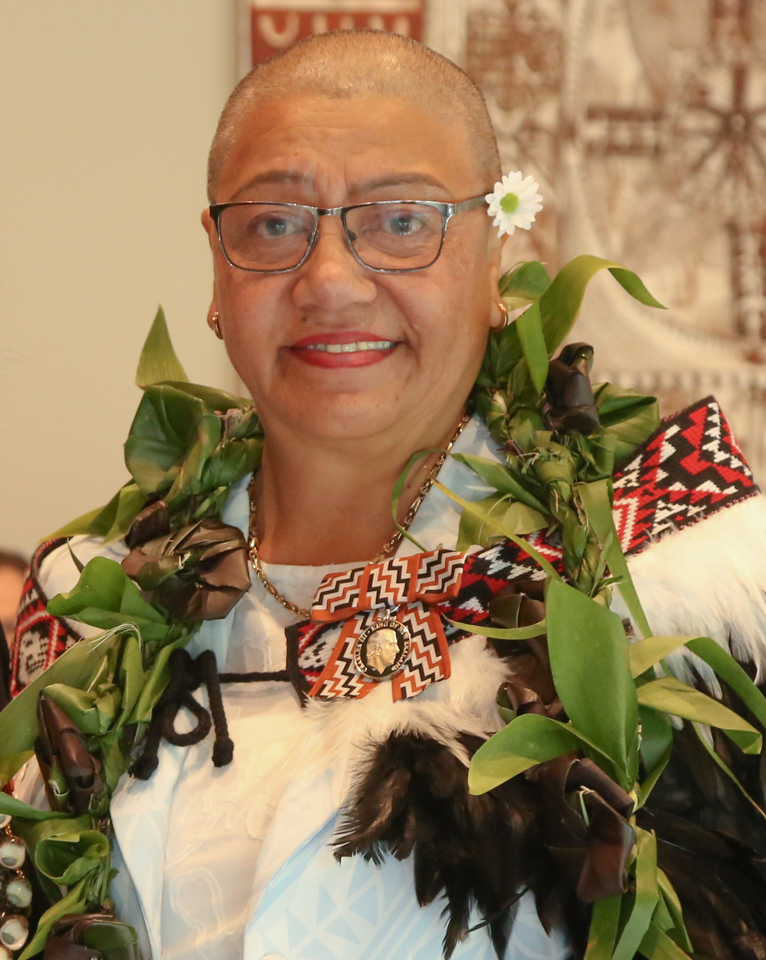
Aere Anne Nicholas

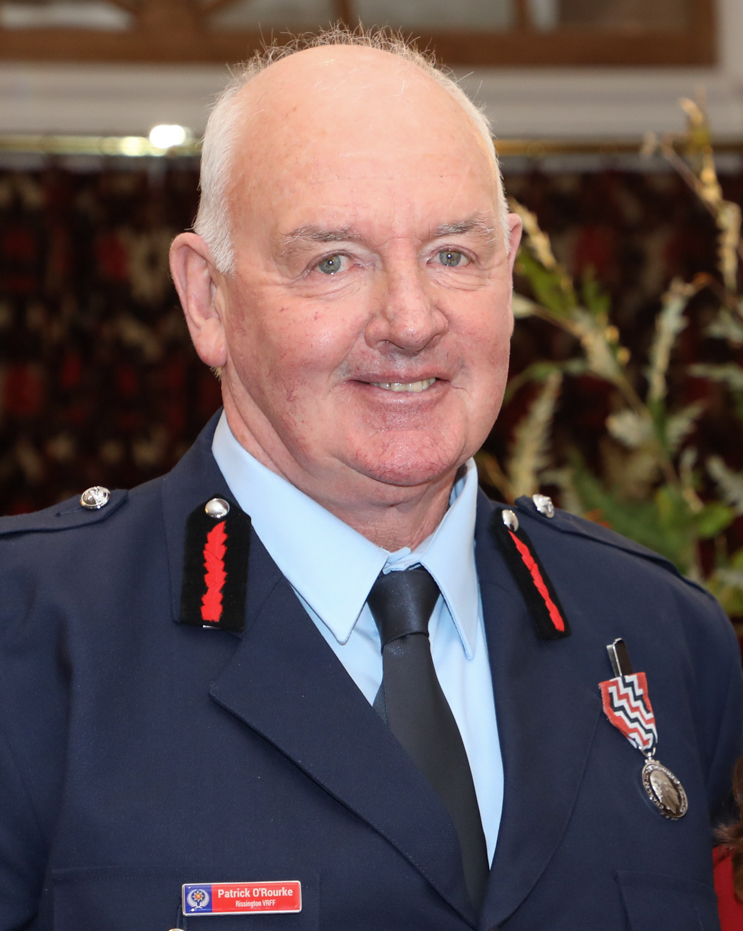
Patrick O'Rourke

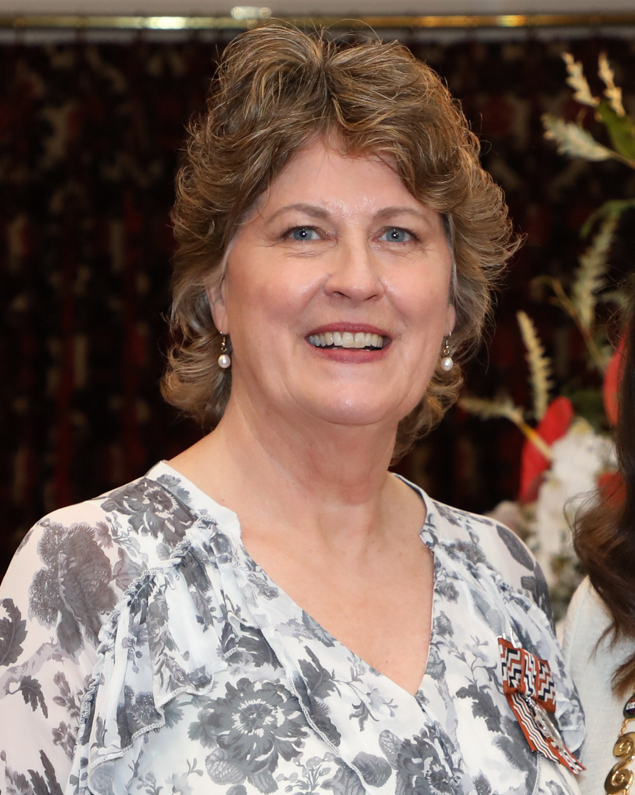
Tania Pinfold

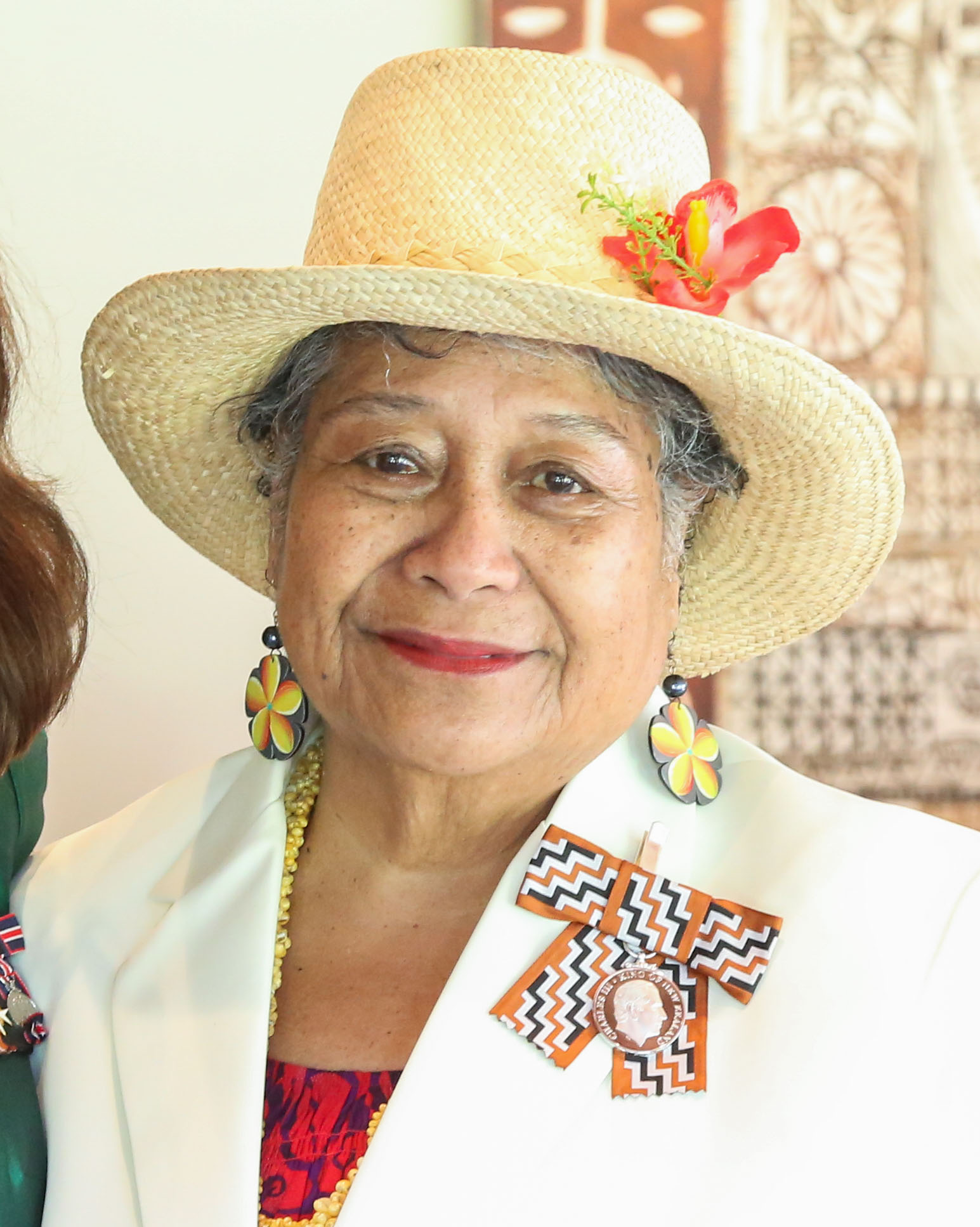
Ena Polima

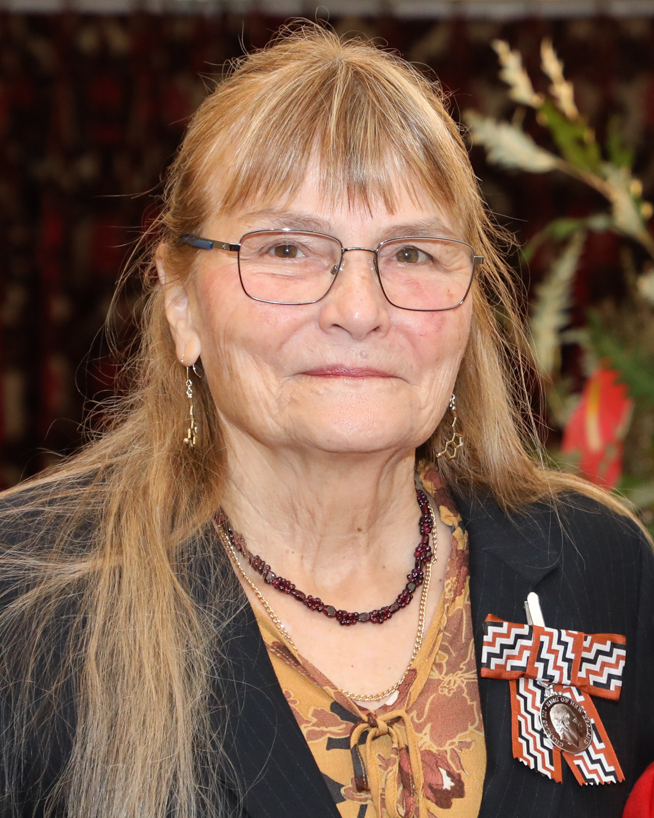
Jackie Robertson

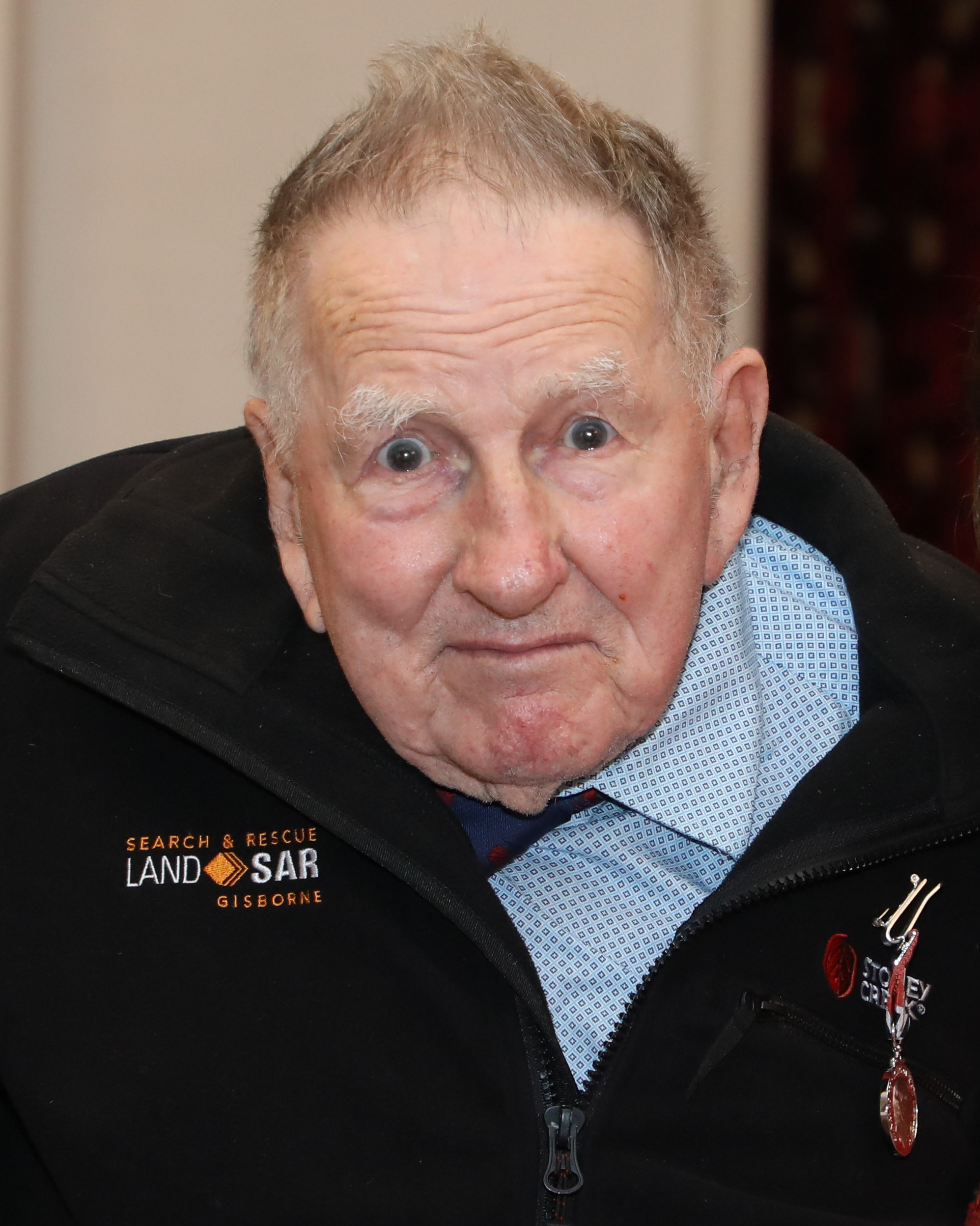
Chris Sharp

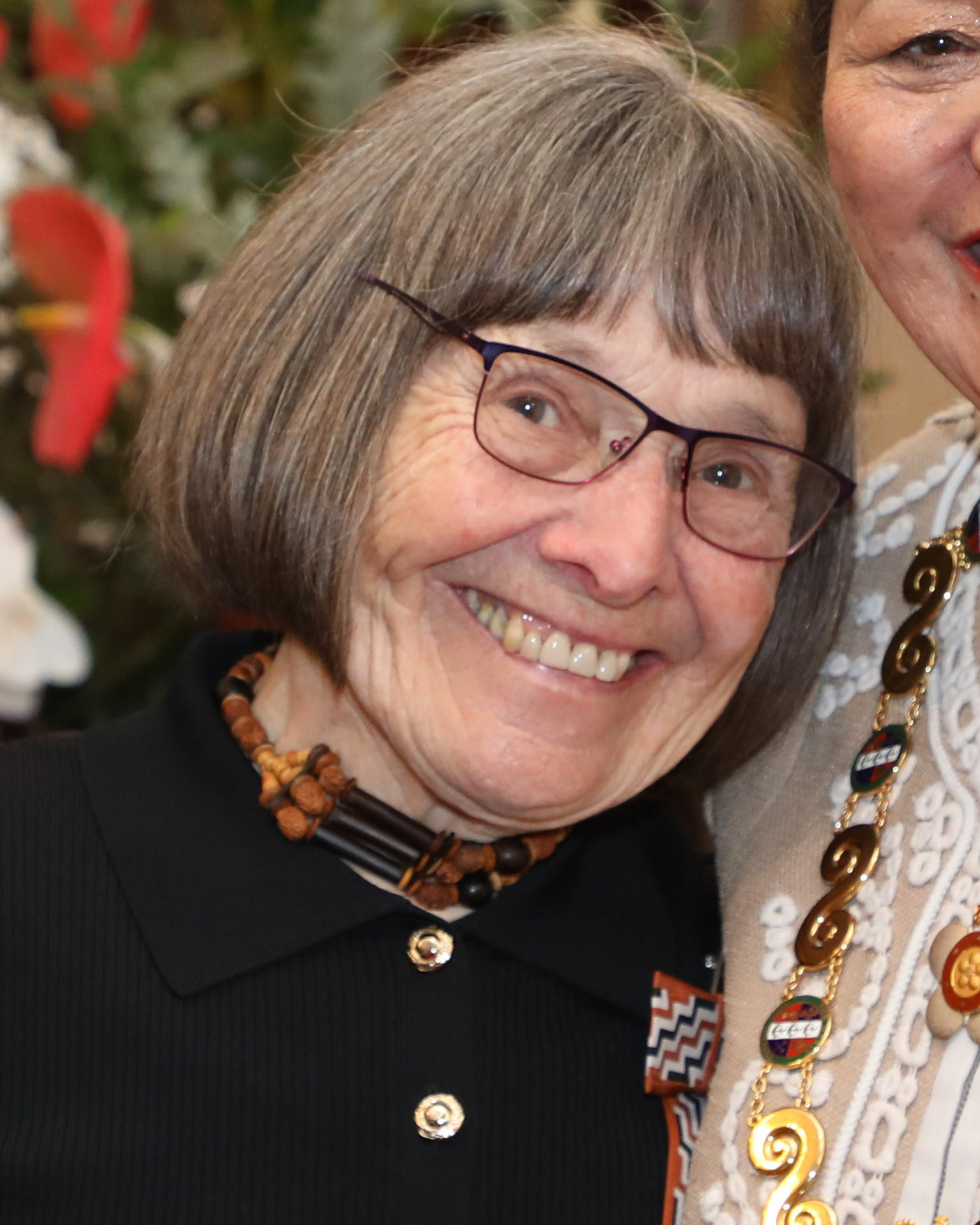
Ruth Shaw

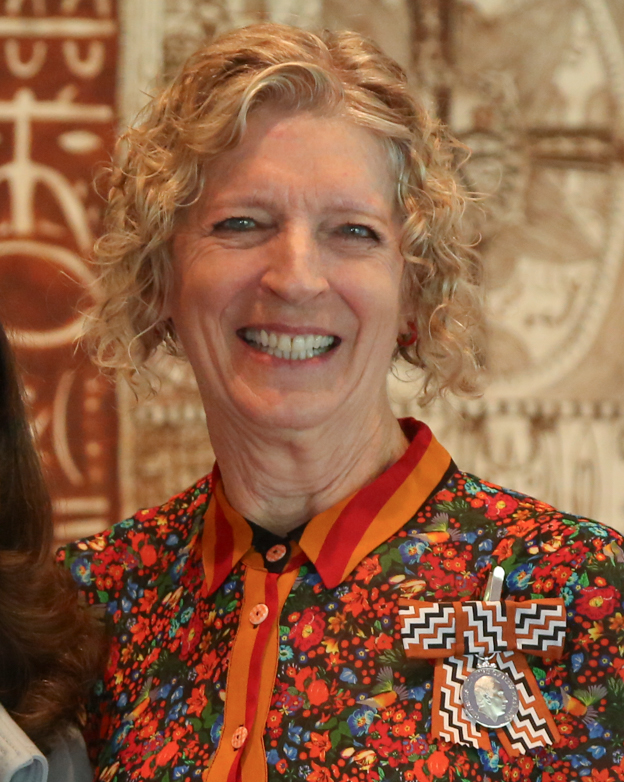
Leonie Sinclair

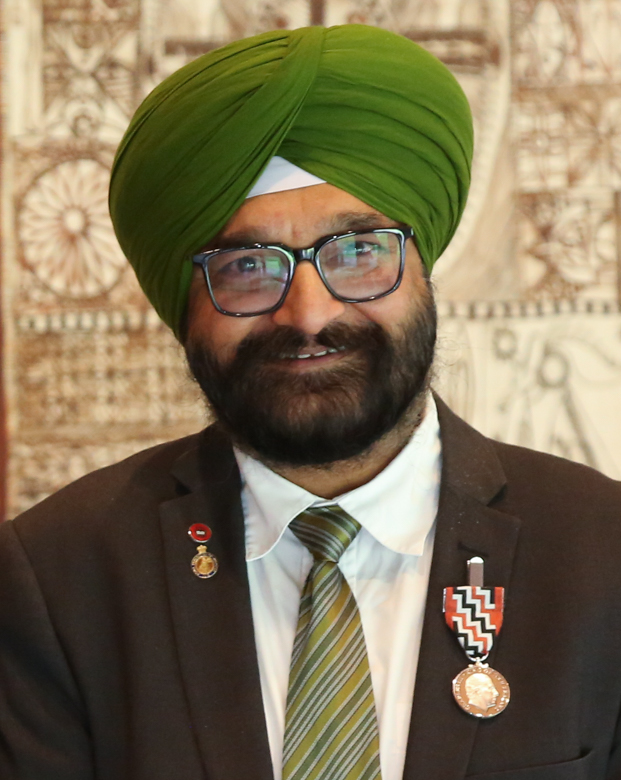
Harjinder Singh

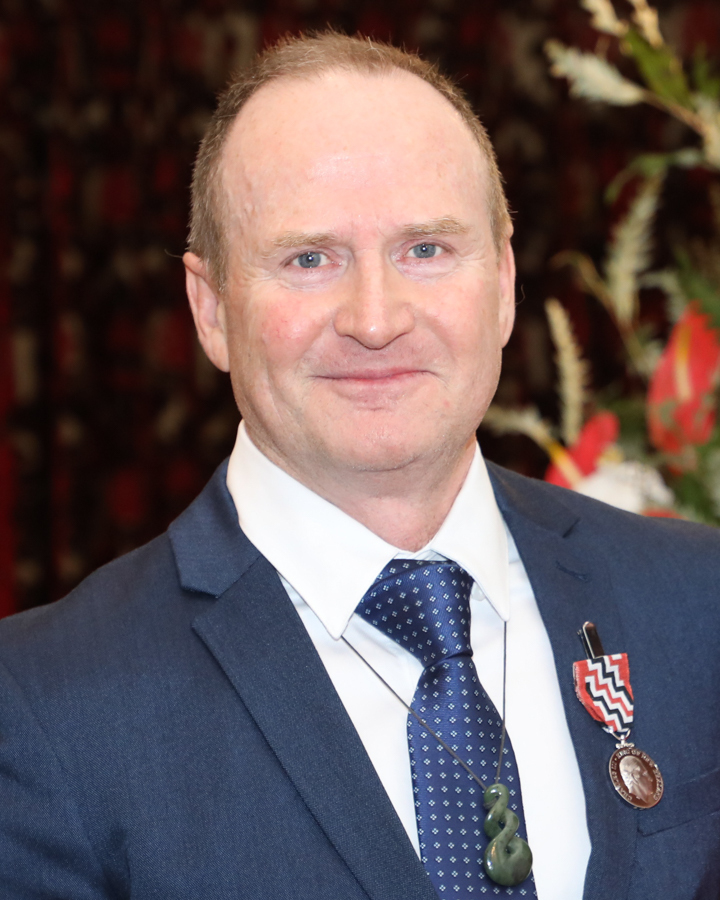
Brian Smith

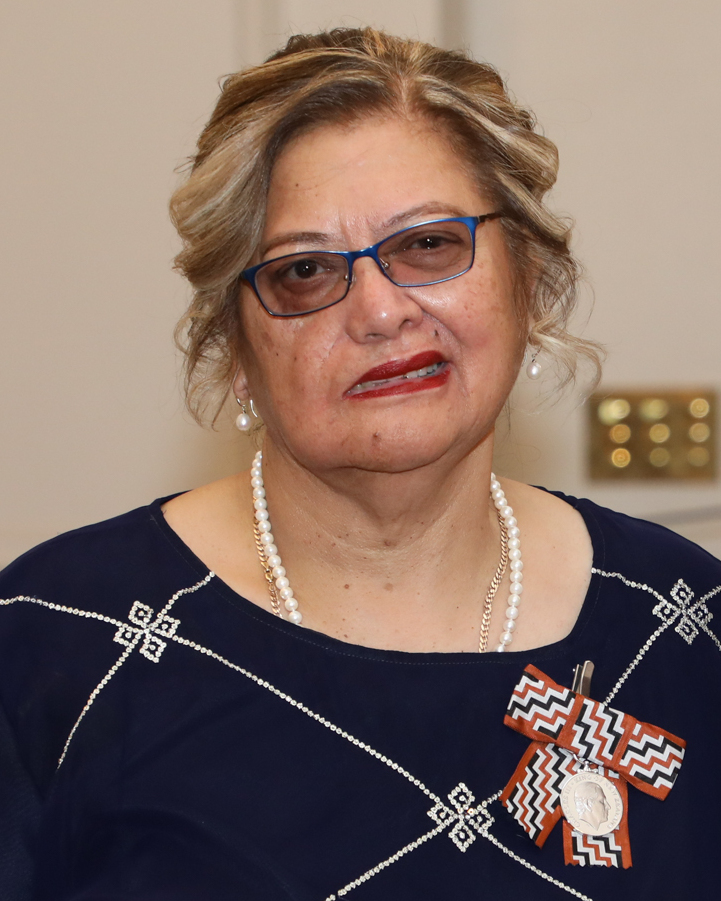
Sailauama Cheryl Talamaivao

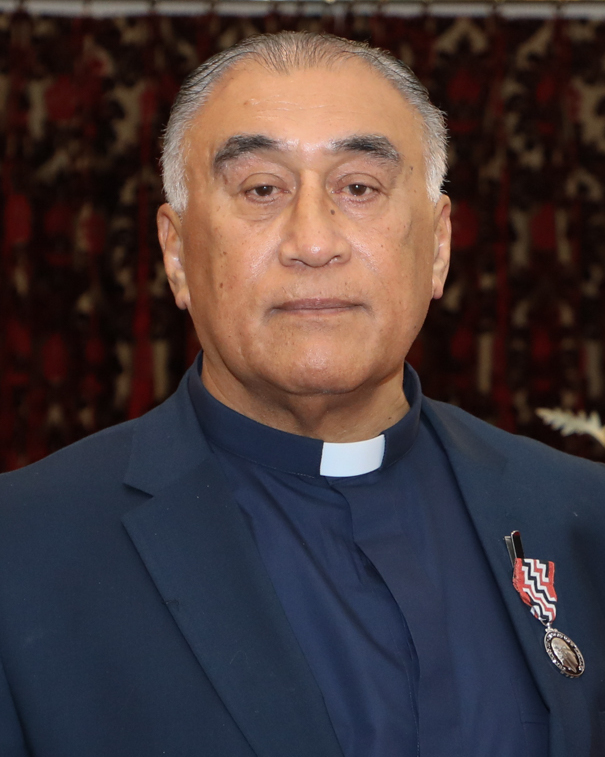
Wayne Toleafoa

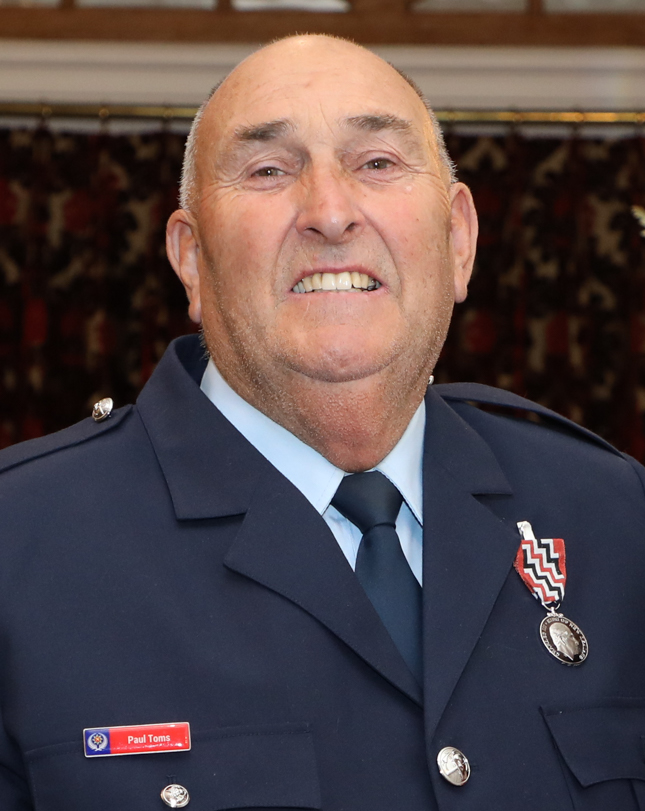
Paul Toms

Russel Trow

Tee Trow

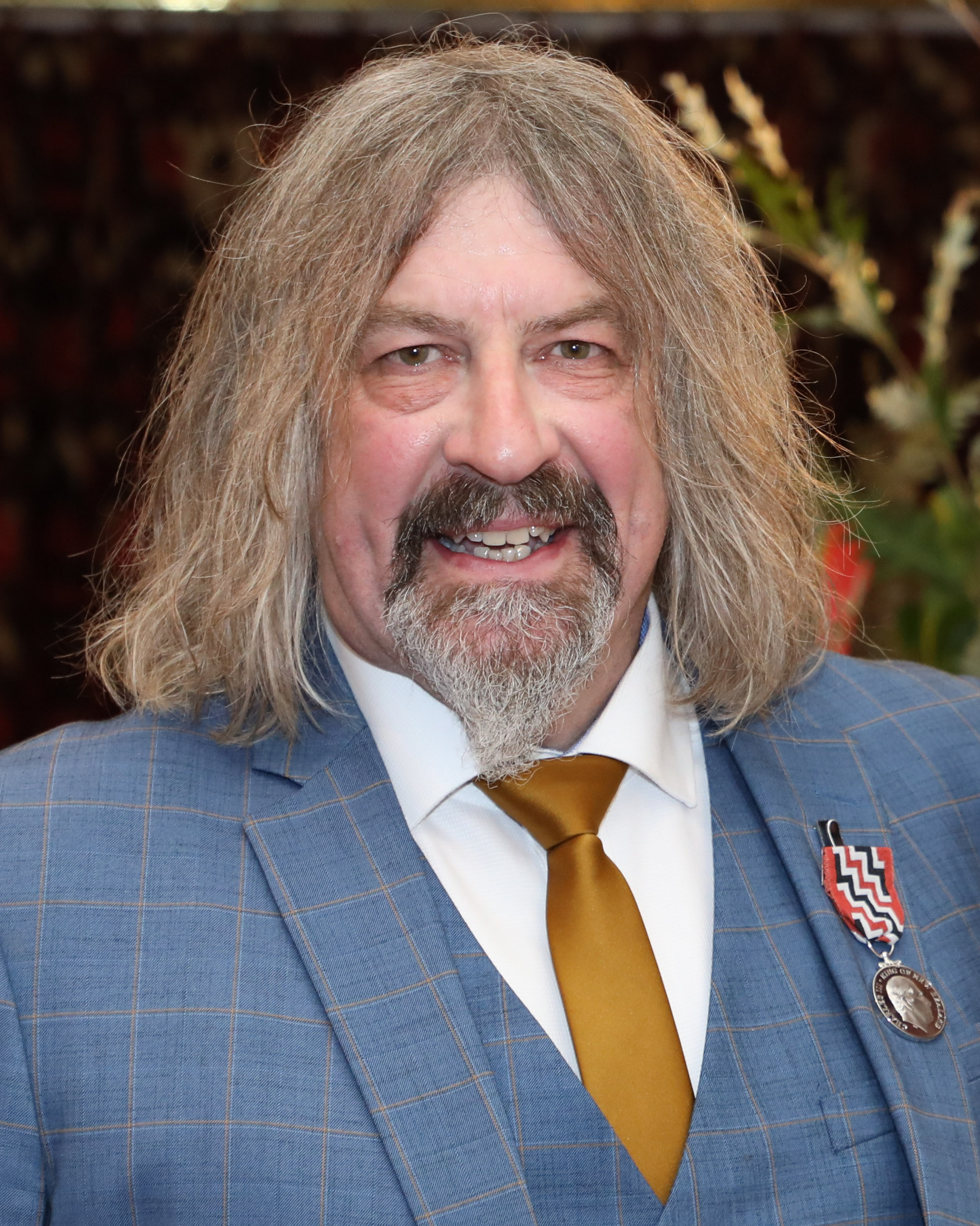
Jonathan Usher

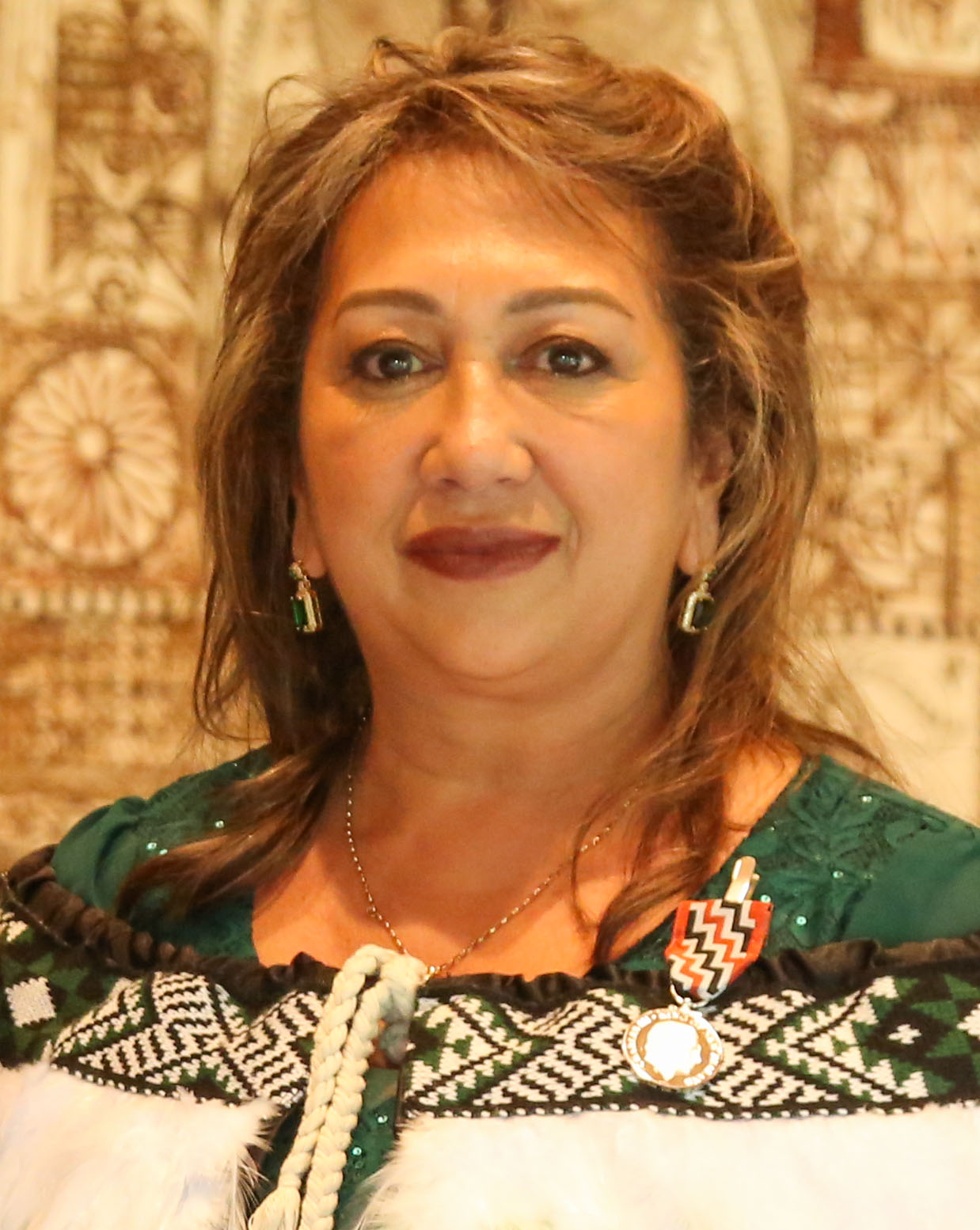
Norma-Jean Van De Rheede

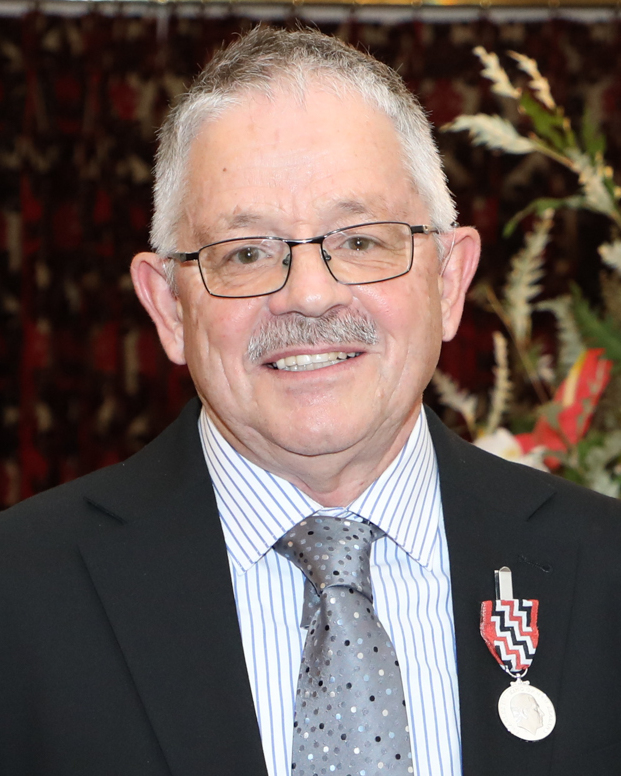
Ian Watts

Del Whyte

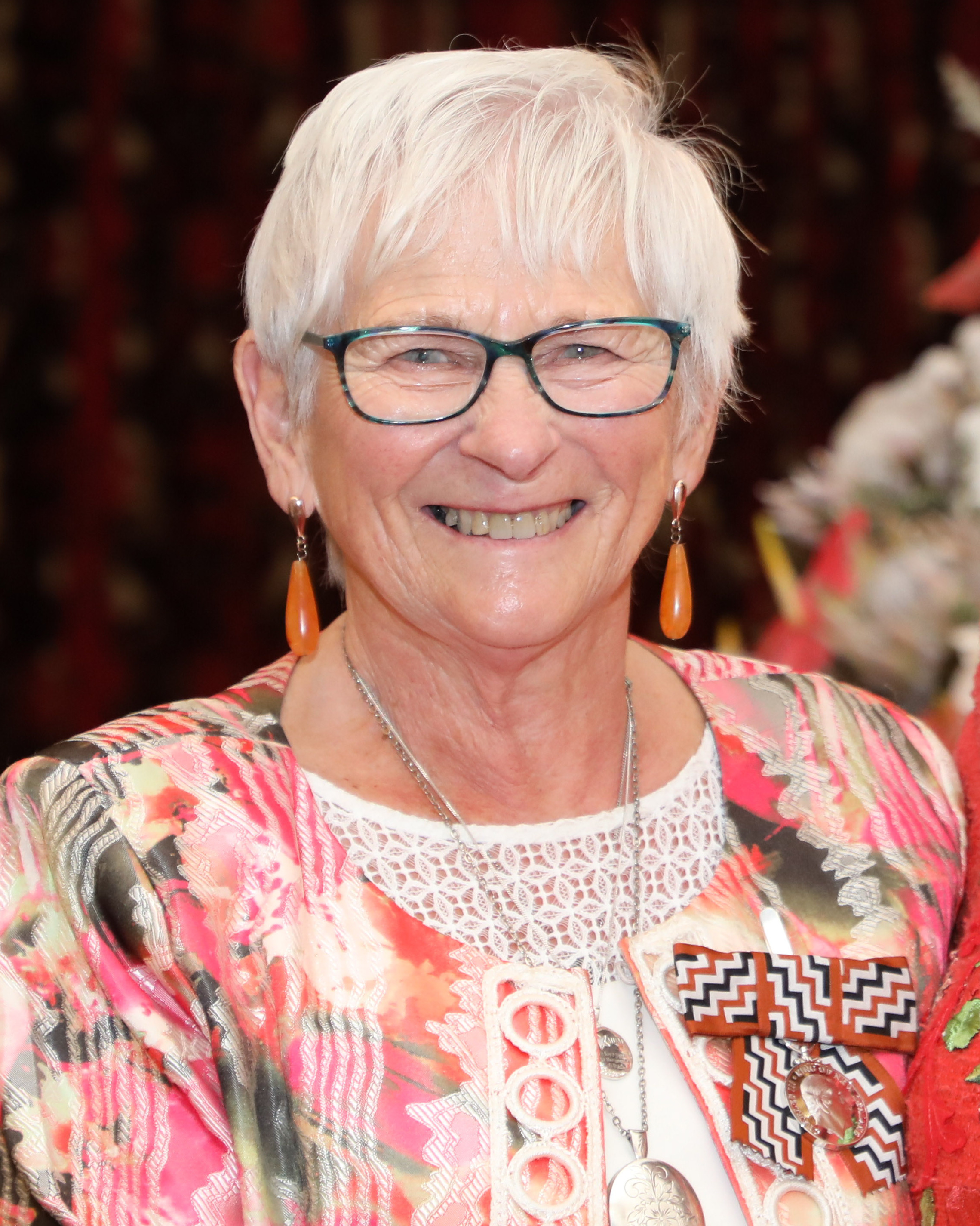
Ella Wilson

== New Zealand Distinguished Service Decoration (DSD) ==
- Commodore Andrew Gilchrist Brown – of Wellington. For services to the New Zealand Defence Force.
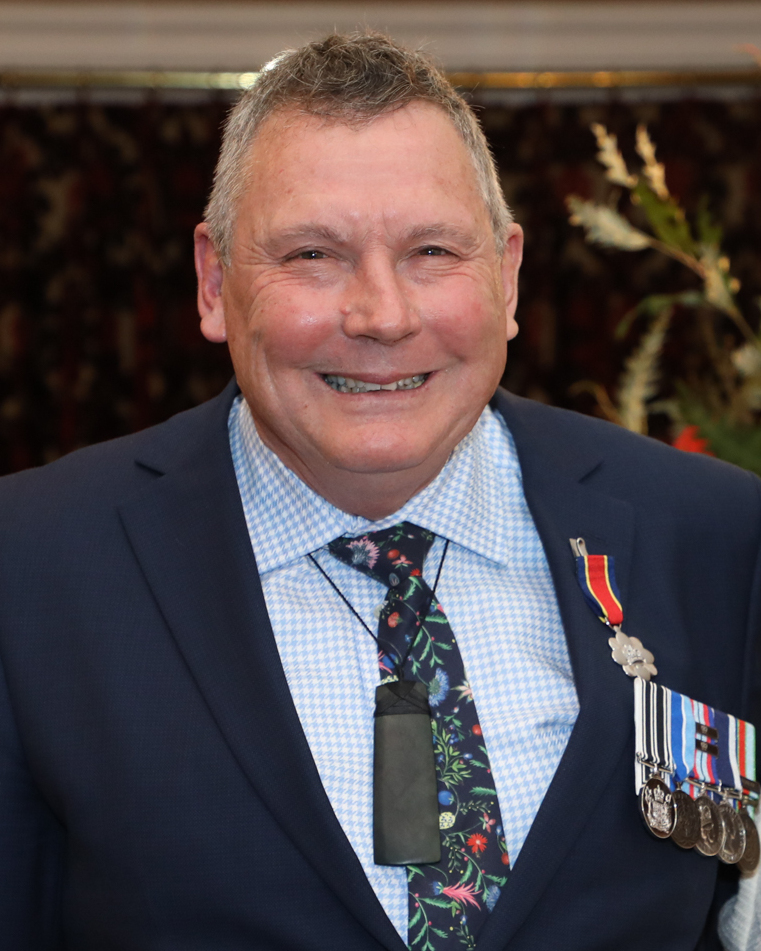
Andrew Brown
